= Duchess of St Albans =

Duchess of St Albans is a title given to the wife of the Duke of St Albans, an extant title in the Peerage of England, created in 1684 by King Charles II and given to his illegitimate child with Nell Gwynn, Charles Beauclerk, 1st Duke of St Albans.

== List of Duchesses of St Albans ==
#	Portrait	Name	Birth	Marriage	Became Duchess of St Albans	Spouse	Ceased to be Duchess of St Albans	Death	Reason ceased being Duchess
1		Lady Diana de Vere	1679	17 April 1694		Charles Beauclerk, 1st Duke of St Albans	11 May 1726	15 January 1742	Husband's death
2		Lucy Werden	6 July 1707	13 December 1722	11 May 1726	Charles Beauclerk, 2nd Duke of St Albans	27 July 1751		Died
3		Jane Roberts	1731	23 December 1752		George Beauclerk, 3rd Duke of St Albans	16 December 1778		Died
4		Lady Catherine Ponsonby	14 October 1742	10 February 1787		Aubrey Beauclerk, 5th Duke of St Albans	4 September 1789		Died
5		Lady Louisa Manners	4 December 1777	15 August 1802		Aubrey Beauclerk, 6th Duke of St Albans	12 August 1815	19 February 1816	Husband's death
6		Maria Nelthorpe	1779	4 March 1799	19 February 1816	William Beauclerk, 8th Duke of St Albans	17 January 1822		Died
7		Harriet Mellon	11 November 1777	16 June 1827		William Beauclerk, 9th Duke of St Albans	6 August 1837		Died
8		Elizabeth Gubbins	1818	29 May 1839		William Beauclerk, 9th Duke of St Albans	27 May 1849	2 December 1893	Husband's death
9		Lady Sybil Grey	28 November 1848	20 June 1867		William Beauclerk, 10th Duke of St Albans	7 September 1871		Died
10		Grace Bernal-Osborne	26 July 1848	3 January 1874		William Beauclerk, 10th Duke of St Albans	10 May 1898	18 November 1926	Husband's death
11		Lady Beatrix Petty-FitzMaurice	25 March 1877	19 August 1918	19 September 1934	Osborne Beauclerk, 12th Duke of St Albans	5 August 1953		Died
12		Suzanne Fesq	4 May 1921	19 March 1947	2 March 1964	Charles Beauclerk, 13th Duke of St Albans	8 October 1988	12 February 2010	Husband's death
13		Cynthia Howard	1929	29 August 1974	8 October 1988	Murray Beauclerk, 14th Duke of St Albans	2001	12 May 2002	Divorce
14		Gillian Northam	April 1939	14 December 2002		Murray Beauclerk, 14th Duke of St Albans	22 April 2026	Living	Husband's death
15	Sarah Beauclerk	Sarah Davenport	February 1983	June 2017	22 April 2026	Charles Beauclerk, 15th Duke of St Albans	Current	Living	N/A

== Wives that did not become Duchess of St Albans ==
- Jane Mary Moses married Aubrey Beauclerk (later the 6th Duke) in 1788 but died in 1800. Aubrey became the Duke in 1802 and, therefore, Jane never became Duchess.
- Charlotte Thelwell married William (later the 8th Duke) in 1791. She died in 1797, however never became Duchess, as William only became the Duke in 1816.
- Nathalie Walker married Charles (later the 13th Duke). They divorced in 1947, and Nathalie never became Duchess, as Charles only became the Duke in 1964.
- Rosemary Frances Scoones married Murray (later the 14th Duke). They divorced in 1974, and Rosemary never became Duchess, as Murray only became the Duke in 1988.

== Unmarried Dukes of St Albans ==
- George Beauclerk, 4th Duke of St Albans died unmarried and childless in 1787, therefore there was no Duchess consort during this period. The title passed to his cousin Aubrey Beauclerk, 5th Duke of St Albans.
- The 7th Duke, Aubrey, died in childhood, and therefore never got married or had any issue.
- Charles Beauclerk, 11th Duke of St Albans, died unmarried and childless in 1934, and was succeeded by his half-brother, Osborne, who became the 12th Duke.

== See also ==
- Duke of St Albans
