= George Beauclerk =

George Beauclerk may refer to:

- Lord George Beauclerk (1704–1768), British Army officer
- George Beauclerk, 3rd Duke of St Albans (1730–1786), British peer
- George Beauclerk, 4th Duke of St Albans (1758–1787), British peer
