= Lord William Beauclerk =

British army officer and politician

Lord William Beauclerk (22 May 1698 – 1733) was a British army officer and politician who sat in the House of Commons from 1724 to 1733.

Beauclerk was the second son of Charles Beauclerk, 1st Duke of St Albans, and his wife Lady Diana de Vere, daughter of Aubrey de Vere, 20th and last Earl of Oxford. He was educated at Eton College in 1707 and joined the army. He was a lieutenant in the 2nd Foot in 1716 and a captain in the Royal Horse Guards in 1721. He married Charlotte Werden, daughter of Sir John Werden, 2nd Baronet on. 13 December 1722.

Beauclerk was returned as Member of Parliament for Chichester at a by-election on 20 January 1724 with the support of his cousin Charles Lennox. He supported the Administration throughout his time in Parliament. He was returned at Chichester at the 1727 general election. In 1728 he was appointed vice-chamberlain of the Household to Queen Caroline.

Beauclerk died on 23 February 1733. He left two sons and two daughters. Through his son Lt.-Col. Charles Beauclerk he was the grandfather of George Beauclerk, 4th Duke of St Albans. His brothers Charles Beauclerk, Earl of Burford, Vere, Henry, Sidney and George were also Members of Parliament.

Parliament of Great Britain
Preceded by Charles Lennox; Thomas Miller	Member of Parliament for Chichester; 1724–1733; With: Thomas Miller 1724-1727; Charles Lumley 1727-1729; James Lumley 1729-1733	Succeeded by Sir Thomas Prendergast, 2nd Baronet; James Lumley
