= James, Lord Beauclerk =

English and Scottish Noble

James Beauclerk Lord Beauclerk
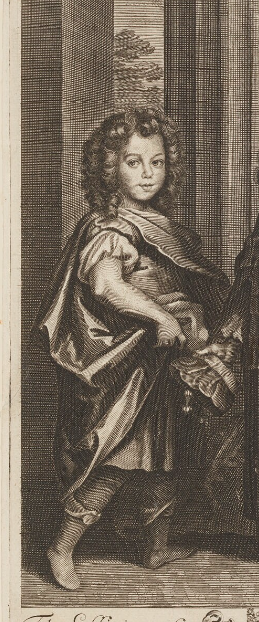
- Engraving of Beauclerk, 1679
- Born: James Beauclerk, Lord Beauclerk; December 25, 1671; London, England
- Died: September 1680 or 1681 (aged 8–9); Paris, Kingdom of France
- Parents: Charles II of England (father); Nell Gwyn (mother)
- Family: Beauclerk

James, Lord Beauclerk (25 December 1671 - September 1680 or 1681) was an illegitimate son of King Charles II of England, the second by his mistress Nell Gwyn. He died in childhood in Paris in September 1680 or 1681. His cause of death is unknown.

== Biography ==
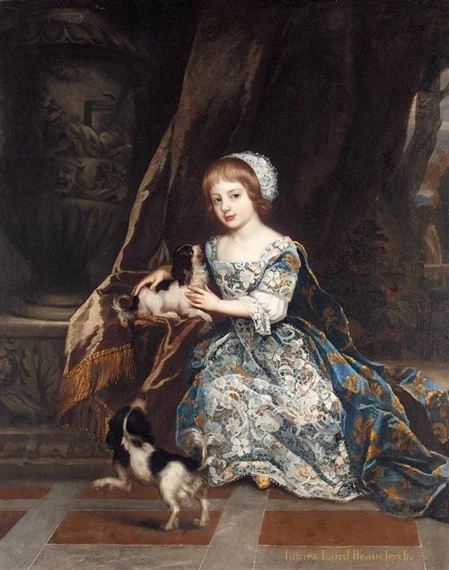
Portrait painting of Beauclerk, c. 1675

Beauclerk was born James Beauclerk in London on Christmas Day 1671, to Charles II of England and actress Nell Gwyn, as an illegitimate child. Little is known about his upbringing. He was raised in the private residence's of Nell Gwyn, alongside his older brother, Charles Beauclerk. On January 17, 1676, he was given the courtesy style "Lord Beauclerk", a subsidiary title of his brothers peerage, the Duke of St. Albans, which was awarded on the same day. As a recognized son of the King, he likely would've been created his own title, had he lived into adulthood. Not long after, at around age 6, Beauclerk was sent to Paris to receive an aristocratic education. Nothing is known about his time spent in France. He died between September 1680 - 1681, whilst still attending schooling in the city. His burial details are unknown.

== Ancestry ==
Ancestors of James, Lord Beauclerk

8. James VI and I of England
4. Charles I of England
9. Anne of Denmark
2. Charles II of England
10. Henri IV of France
5. Henrietta Maria of France
11. Marie de Medici, Queen of France
1. James, Lord Beauclerk
12. Robert Edward Gwynne
6. Thomas Gwynne
13. Marie Popham
3. Nell Gwyn
14. John Smith
7. Helena Smith
15. Unknown

== See also ==
- Nell Gwyn
- Charles II of England
- Charles Beauclerk, 1st Duke of St. Albans
- Peerage of England
- Stuart Restoration
- House of Stuart
