= Duke of St Albans =

Title in the Peerage of England

Dukedom of St Albans
- Arms of Murray Beauclerk, 14th Duke of St Albans: Grand quarterly, 1st and 4th grand quarters: the Royal Arms of Charles II, viz. quarterly: 1st and 4th, France and England quarterly; 2nd, Scotland; 3rd, Ireland; the whole debruised by a baton sinister gules charged with three roses argent barbed and seeded proper (Lennox); 2nd and 3rd grand quarters: quarterly gules and or, in the first quarter a mullet argent (De Vere). (Arms of the 2nd Duke onwards)
- Creation date: 10 January 1684
- Created by: Charles II
- Peerage: Peerage of England
- First holder: Charles Beauclerk, 1st Earl of Burford
- Present holder: Charles Beauclerk, 15th Duke of St Albans
- Heir apparent: James Beauclerk, Earl of Burford
- Remainder to: 1st Duke's heirs male of the body lawfully begotten
- Subsidiary titles: Earl of Burford; Baron Heddington; Baron Vere
- Former seats: Bestwood Lodge; Upper Gatton Park; Newtown Anner House
- Motto: Auspicium melioris aevi (Latin for 'A pledge of better times')

Duke of St Albans is a title in the Peerage of England. It was created in 1684 for Charles Beauclerk, 1st Earl of Burford, then 14 years old. King Charles II had accepted that Burford was his illegitimate son by Nell Gwyn, an actress, and awarded him the dukedom just as he had conferred those of Monmouth, Southampton, Grafton, Northumberland, and Richmond and Lennox on his other illegitimate sons who married.

The subsidiary titles of the Duke are Earl of Burford, in the County of Oxford (1676), Baron Heddington, in the same (1676) and Baron Vere, of Hanworth in the County of Middlesex (1750). The Earldom and the Barony of Heddington are in the Peerage of England, and the Barony of Vere is in the Peerage of Great Britain. The dukes hold the hereditary title of Grand Falconer of England, and until the end of the 18th century they were Hereditary Registrars of the Court of Chancery.

By tradition, the Earldom and Vere barony are used as courtesy titles by the duke's heir apparent and his heir apparent respectively.

The accepted pronunciation of Beauclerk is reflected in frequent early renderings Beauclaire: /ˈboʊklɛər, boʊˈklɛər/.

== Estates and residences ==
=== Country seats ===
Until the 20th century, the country seats of the dukes of St Albans included Bestwood Lodge in Nottinghamshire, which was given to the 1st Duke's mother, the celebrated actress and mistress to Charles II, Nell Gwyn, as well as Redbourne Hall near Redbourne, Lincolnshire.

William Beauclerk, 10th Duke of St Albans made Bestwood his principal residence in 1849, and oversaw the construction of the current house on the site of a former hunting lodge during 1862-1865. Following the completion of the Gothic Revival-style house which still stands today in 1865, the 10th Duke continued to occupy the house until his death in 1898.

In the 1883 Edition of John Bateman's The Great Landowners of Great Britain and Ireland the Duke of St Albans was recorded as owning an estate comprising 5,255 acres in Lincolnshire and 3,743 acres in Nottinghamshire, which produced an combined income of £10,955 annually.

Following the death of the 10th Duke, Bestwood Lodge was leased by a series of tenants during the early 20th century, until the house and surrounding estate were sold 1939 by Osborne Beauclerk, 12th Duke of St Albans. When the estate was soon offered for re-sale in 1940, The Daily Telegraph reported that it comprised 3,485 acres producing over £3,300 annually. Bestwood Lodge was later converted into a hotel.

The family estates in Lincolnshire, comprising approximlately 5,400 acres centred on Redbourne Hall, were sold in 1917 for £106,000.

The 12th Duke also inherited Newtown Anner House (near Clonmel, County Tipperary), which continued to be a family seat in the 1940s until it was sold in the mid-20th century. Today the house is privately owned and not open to the public.

The 13th, 14th and present dukes have not inherited landed estates or country houses.

=== London residences ===
William Beauclerk, 8th Duke of St Albans leased No. 41 Brook Street, Mayfair as his London house from 1794 until 1818.

During the early-to-mid nineteenth century, the London residence of William Beauclerk, 9th Duke of St Albans was No. 80 Piccadilly; the house had been bequeathed by the Banker Thomas Coutts to his widow, Harriet Mellon, who had remarried the Duke in 1827. Following Harriet's death in 1837 she bequeathed most of her property to her first husband's granddaughter Angela Burdett-Coutts, although No. 80 Piccadilly continued to be the London residence associated with the Duke of St Albans during the 1840s.

The 9th Duke died in 1849, and by 1863 his son William Beauclerk, 10th Duke of St Albans had taken No. 4 Prince's Gate in Knightsbridge as his London house; which he continued to occupy until at least 1882. By 1890 the 10th Duke had taken 13 Grosvenor Crescent, Belgravia as his London house, which continued to be his London home until his death in 1898.

Following his death his widow Grace, Dowager Duchess of St Albans leased No. 49 Cadogan Gardens, which remained as her London residence until her death in 1926.

The 10th Duke's eldest son Charles Beauclerk, 11th Duke of St Albans was soon confined in Ticehurst Asylum in 1899, where he continued to reside until he died in 1934. He was succeeded by his younger half-brother Osborne Beauclerk, 12th Duke of St Albans, who did not maintain a residence in London. He died childless in 1964, and was succeeded by his second-cousin Charles Beauclerk, 13th Duke of St Albans, whose son, Murray Beauclerk, 14th Duke of St Albans lived at No. 16 Ovington Street during the 21st century.

== Dukes of St Albans (1684) ==
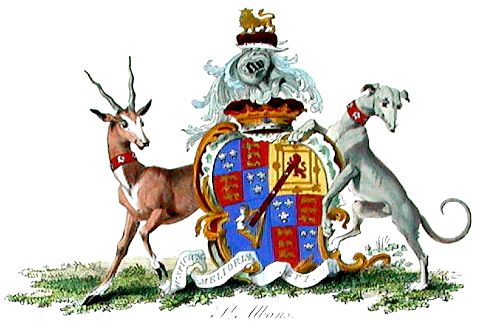
Arms of the 1st Duke of St Albans

Other titles: Earl of Burford, in the county of Oxford, and Baron Heddington, in the county of Oxford (1676)

- Charles Beauclerk, 1st Duke of St Albans (1670–1726) (elder illegitimate son of Charles II and Nell Gwynn)
- Charles Beauclerk, 2nd Duke of St Albans (1696–1751) (eldest son of the 1st Duke)
- George Beauclerk, 3rd Duke of St Albans (1720–1786) (only son of the 2nd Duke, died without issue)
- George Beauclerk, 4th Duke of St Albans (1758–1787) (grandson of Lord William Beauclerk, second son of the 1st Duke, died unmarried)

Other titles (5th Duke onwards): Baron Vere, of Hanworth in the county of Middlesex (1750)

- Aubrey Beauclerk, 5th Duke of St Albans (1740–1802) (fourth and youngest son of Vere Beauclerk, 1st Baron Vere, himself third son of the 1st Duke)
- Aubrey Beauclerk, 6th Duke of St Albans (1765–1815) (eldest son of the 5th Duke)
- Aubrey Beauclerk, 7th Duke of St Albans (1815–1816) (only son of the 6th Duke, died in infancy)
- William Beauclerk, 8th Duke of St Albans (1766–1825) (second son of the 5th Duke)
- William Aubrey de Vere Beauclerk, 9th Duke of St. Albans (1801–1849) (eldest son of the 8th Duke)
- William Amelius Aubrey de Vere Beauclerk, 10th Duke of St Albans (1840–1898) (only son of the 9th Duke)
- Charles Victor Albert Aubrey de Vere Beauclerk, 11th Duke of St Albans (1870–1934) (eldest son of the 10th Duke, died without issue)
- Osborne de Vere Beauclerk, 12th Duke of St Albans (1874–1964) (second son of the 10th Duke, died without issue)
- Charles Frederick Aubrey de Vere Beauclerk, 13th Duke of St Albans (1915–1988) (grandson of Lord Charles Beauclerk, fifth son of the 8th Duke)
- Murray de Vere Beauclerk, 14th Duke of St Albans (1939–2026) (eldest son of the 13th Duke)
- Charles Francis Topham de Vere Beauclerk, 15th Duke of St Albans (b. 1965) (only son of the 14th Duke).

The heir apparent is the current holder's only son, James Malcolm Aubrey Edward de Vere Beauclerk, Earl of Burford (b. 1995).

== Barons Vere (1750) ==
- Vere Beauclerk, 1st Baron Vere (1699–1781) (third son of the 1st Duke)
- Aubrey Beauclerk, 2nd Baron Vere (1740–1802) (succeeded as 5th Duke of St Albans in 1787)

for subsequent Barons Vere see Dukes of St Albans above

== Current line of succession ==
Line of succession (simplified)
- Charles Beauclerk, 1st Duke of St Albans (1670–1726)
  - Charles Beauclerk, 2nd Duke of St Albans (1696–1751)
    - George Beauclerk, 3rd Duke of St Albans (1730–1786)
  - Lord William Beauclerk (1698–1733)
    - George Beauclerk (d. 1775)
      - George Beauclerk, 4th Duke of St Albans (1758–1787)
  - Vere Beauclerk, 1st Baron Vere (1699–1781)
    - Aubrey Beauclerk, 5th Duke of St Albans (1740–1802)
      - Aubrey Beauclerk, 6th Duke of St Albans (1765–1815)
        - Aubrey Beauclerk, 7th Duke of St Albans (1815–1816)
      - William Beauclerk, 8th Duke of St Albans (1766–1825)
        - William Beauclerk, 9th Duke of St Albans (1801–1849)
          - William Beauclerk, 10th Duke of St Albans (1840–1898)
            - Charles Beauclerk, 11th Duke of St Albans (1870–1934)
            - Osborne Beauclerk, 12th Duke of St Albans (1874–1964)
        - Lord Charles Beauclerk (1813–1861)
          - Aubrey Topham Beauclerk (1850–1933)
            - Charles Beauclerk, 13th Duke of St Albans (1915–1988)
              - Murray Beauclerk, 14th Duke of St Albans (1939–2026)
                - Charles Beauclerk, 15th Duke of St Albans (b. 1965)
                  - (1) James Malcolm Aubrey Edward de Vere Beauclerk, Earl of Burford (b. 1995)
              - (2) Lord Peter Charles de Vere Beauclerk (b. 1948)
              - (3) Lord James Charles Fesq de Vere Beauclerk (b. 1949)
              - (4) Lord John William Aubrey de Vere Beauclerk (b. 1950)
  - Lord Sidney Beauclerk (1703–1744)
    - Topham Beauclerk (1739–1780)
      - Charles George Beauclerk (1774–1845)
        - Charles Robert Beauclerk (1802–1872)
          - William Topham Sidney Beauclerk (1864–1950)
            - Ralph Beauclerk (1917–2007)
              - male descendants in remainder

== Arms ==
Coat of arms of the Duke of St Albans
Coronet A Duke's coronet Crest On a Chapeau Gules turned up Ermine a Lion statant guardant Or crowned with a ducal coronet per pale Argent and of the First and gorged with a Collar of the Last thereon three Roses also Argent barbed and seeded Proper Escutcheon Grand quarterly, 1st and 4th grand quarters: the Royal Arms of Charles II, viz quarterly: 1st and 4th, France and England quarterly; 2nd, Scotland; 3rd, Ireland; the whole debruised by a Baton sinister Gules charged with three Roses Argent barbed and seeded Proper (Beauclerk); 2nd and 3rd grand quarters: quarterly Gules and Or in the first quarter a Mullet Argent (De Vere) Supporters Dexter: an Antelope Argent armed and unguled Or; Sinister: a Greyhound Argent, each gorged with a Collar as in the Crest Motto Auspicium melioris aevi (Latin for 'A pledge of better times')

== Family tree ==
Beauclerk family tree: Dukes of St Albans

King Charles II; 1630–1685
illegitimate
with Lucy Walter	with Catherine Pegge	with Barbara (Villiers) Palmer	with Nell Gwyn; 1650–1687	with Louise de Kérouaille
Earl of Burford and Baron Heddington in the County of Oxford, 1676; Duke of St Albans, 1684
James Scott; 1649–1685; Duke of Monmouth, Duke of Buccleuch	Charles FitzCharles; 1657–1680; Earl of Plymouth	Charles FitzRoy; 1662–1730; Duke of Cleveland, Duke of Southampton	Henry FitzRoy; 1663–1690; Duke of Grafton	George FitzRoy; 1665–1716; Duke of Northumberland	Charles Beauclerk; 1670–1726; 1st Duke of St Albans, etc.	Charles Lennox; 1672–1723; Duke of Richmond, Duke of Lennox
Baron Vere of Hanworth in the County of Middlesex, 1750
Charles Beauclerk; 1696–1751; 2nd Duke of St Albans, etc.	William Beauclerk; 1698–1733	Vere Beauclerk; 1699–1781; 1st Baron Vere of Hanworth
George Beauclerk; 1720–1786; 3rd Duke of St Albans, etc.	Charles Beauclerk (d. 1775)	Aubrey Beauclerk; 1740–1802; 5th Duke of St Albans, etc., 2nd Baron Vere of Hanworth
George Beauclerk; 1758–1787; 4th Duke of St Albans, etc.	Aubrey Beauclerk; 1765–1815; 6th Duke of St Albans, etc., 3rd Baron Vere of Hanworth	William Beauclerk; 1766–1825; 8th Duke of St Albans, etc., 5th Baron Vere of Hanworth
Aubrey Beauclerk; 1815–1816; 7th Duke of St Albans, etc., 4th Baron Vere of Hanworth	William Aubrey de Vere Beauclerk; 1801–1849; 9th Duke of St Albans, etc., 6th Baron Vere of Hanworth	Charles Beauclerk; 1813–1861
William Amelius Aubrey de Vere Beauclerk; 1840–1898; 10th Duke of St Albans, etc., 7th Baron Vere of Hanworth	Aubrey Topham Beauclerk; 1850–1933
Charles Victor Albert Aubrey de Vere Beauclerk; 1870–1934; 11th Duke of St Albans, etc., 8th Baron Vere of Hanworth	Osborne de Vere Beauclerk; 1874–1964; 12th Duke of St Albans, etc., 9th Baron Vere of Hanworth	Charles Frederick Aubrey de Vere Beauclerk; 1915–1988; 13th Duke of St Albans, etc., 10th Baron Vere of Hanworth
Murray de Vere Beauclerk; 1939–2026; 14th Duke of St Albans, etc., 11th Baron Vere of Hanworth
Charles Francis Topham de Vere Beauclerk (b. 1965); 15th Duke of St Albans, etc., 12th Baron Vere of Hanworth
James Malcolm Aubrey Edward de Vere Beauclerk (b. 1995) styled Earl of Burford

== See also ==
- Duchess of St Albans
