= Murray Beauclerk, 14th Duke of St Albans =

English duke (1939–2026)

His Grace The Duke of St Albans FCA
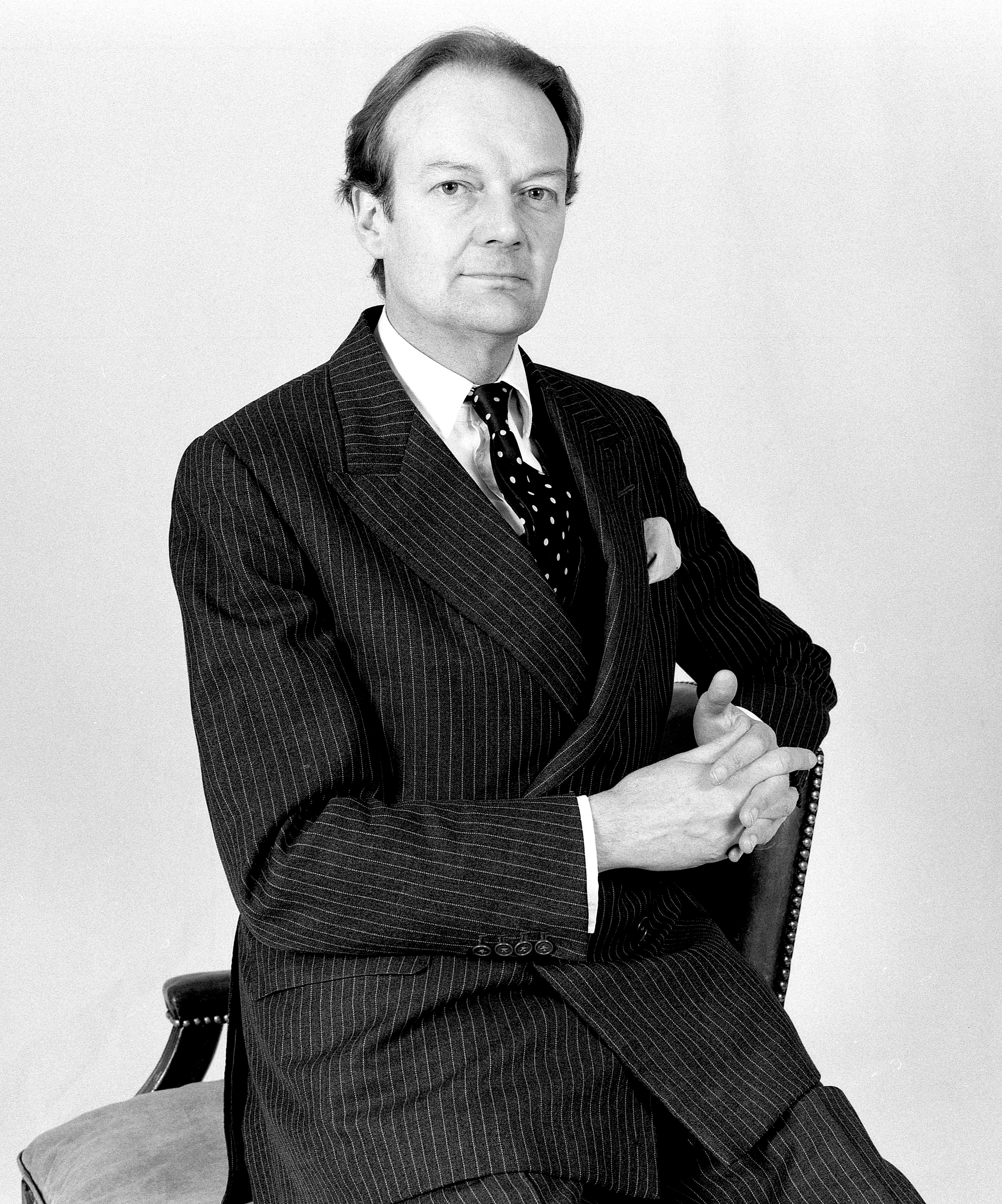
- Formal portrait, 1992 by Allan Warren, London

Member of the House of Lords
- Lord Temporal
- In office 8 October 1988 – 11 November 1999
- Preceded by: The 13th Duke of St Albans
- Succeeded by: Seat abolished (Note: Pursuant to the House of Lords Act 1999.)

Personal details
- Born: 19 January 1939
- Died: 22 April 2026 (aged 87) London, England
- Party: Conservative
- Spouses: Rosemary Scoones (m. 1963; div. 1974) Cynthia Hooper (m. 1974; div. 2001) Gillian Northam (m. 2002)
- Children: Lady Emma Smellie; Charles Beauclerk, 15th Duke of St Albans
- Parent(s): Charles Beauclerk, 13th Duke of St Albans; Nathalie Chatham Walker

Murray de Vere Beauclerk, 14th Duke of St Albans (19 January 1939 – 22 April 2026), styled Earl of Burford from 1964 to 1988, was a British hereditary peer and chartered accountant. He sat as a Conservative member of the House of Lords from 1988 until the House of Lords Act 1999.

== Early life and education ==
Born on 19 January 1939, Beauclerk was the eldest son of Charles Beauclerk, later 13th Duke of St Albans, and the only child from his first marriage to Nathalie Chatham Walker. He was a descendant of Charles II and Nell Gwyn through their illegitimate son, Charles Beauclerk, 1st Duke of St Albans. He was the senior representative of the House of de Vere.

Beauclerk was educated at Tonbridge School in Kent. In 1964, his father succeeded his second cousin Osborne as 13th Duke of Albans, with Murray acquiring the courtesy title of Earl of Burford.

== Career ==
Beauclerk qualified as a chartered accountant in 1962. He was a partner in the London firm Burford & Partners LLP (formerly Burford & Co) from 1981 to 2015.

In 1988, St Albans succeeded his father as 14th Duke of St Albans. The dukedom comes with the honorary position of Hereditary Grand Falconer of England which entitled him to an annual haunch of venison from Richmond Park. This was terminated by Tony Blair's Culture Secretary Chris Smith. He sat in the House of Lords as a Conservative peer until the House of Lords Act 1999. During the debates over the Act, His son and heir Earl of Burford decried the bill from the woolsack and was escorted from the House.

In 2015, he and other British dukes were the subject of the documentary film Modern Times: The Last Dukes. St Albans, billed in the film as ‘The Landless Duke’, appeared, along with his wife Gillian, son Charles and Charles’ future wife Sarah. In the film, the duke and duchess’ coronets and robes are displayed, as well as a portrait of the Duke touched robes with a falcon and glimpses inside the Duke and Duchess’ terraced house in London.

From 1989 to his death, St Albans served as governor-general of the Royal Stuart Society, a monarchist organisation with Jacobite ties. He was also president of the Beaufort Opera, patron of the Bestwood Male Voice Choir, a freeman of the City of London and liveryman of the Worshipful Company of Drapers.

On 12 August 2016, St Albans, accompanied by his wife the Duchess of St Albans, unveiled a blue plaque in Regency Square, Brighton, commemorating Harriot Mellon, the actress who married the 9th Duke of St Albans.

== Marriages and children ==
Cynthia, Duchess of St Albans, by Allan Warren, 1991

St Albans was married three times. On 31 January 1963, he married Rosemary Frances Scoones. They had two children:

- Lady Emma Caroline de Vere Beauclerk (born 22 July 1963). Had issue;
- Charles Francis Topham de Vere Beauclerk, 15th Duke of St Albans (born 22 February 1965). Had issue.

They were divorced in 1974. Rosemary Beauclerk later married Paul Pellew, 10th Viscount Exmouth then William Coleridge, 5th Baron Coleridge.

On 29 August 1974, shortly after his first divorce, he married Cynthia Theresa Mary Howard (1929–2002), former wife of Sir Anthony Robin Hooper, 2nd Baronet. They were divorced in 2001.

St Albans married his third wife Gillian Anita Northam on 14 December 2002 in London. They met at a dinner party.

== Death ==
St Albans died during the night of 22 April 2026 at Chelsea and Westminster Hospital in London, at the age of 87. It was described as ‘fitting’’ that his death should occur on the eve of the birth and death of William Shakespeare, given that St Albans was an Oxfordian. He was succeeded in the dukedom by his son Charles.

A memorial service was held at St Luke's Church, Chelsea on 25 June 2026.

== Arms ==
Coat of arms of Murray Beauclerk, 14th Duke of St Albans
Coronet A Duke's coronet Crest On a Chapeau Gules turned up Ermine a Lion statant guardant Or crowned with a ducal coronet per pale Argent and of the First and gorged with a Collar of the Last thereon three Roses also Argent barbed and seeded Proper Escutcheon Grand quarterly, 1st and 4th grand quarters: the Royal Arms of Charles II, viz quarterly: 1st and 4th, France and England quarterly; 2nd, Scotland; 3rd, Ireland; the whole debruised by a Baton sinister Gules charged with three Roses Argent barbed and seeded Proper (Beauclerk); 2nd and 3rd grand quarters: quarterly Gules and Or in the first quarter a Mullet Argent (De Vere) Supporters Dexter: an Antelope Argent armed and unguled Or; Sinister: a Greyhound Argent, each gorged with a Collar as in the Crest Motto Auspicium Melioris Aevi (A pledge of better times)

== Notes ==
Peerage of England
Preceded by Charles Beauclerk	Duke of St Albans; 1988–2026; Member of the House of Lords (1988–1999)	Succeeded by Charles Beauclerk
Peerage of Great Britain
Preceded by Charles Beauclerk	Baron Vere; 1988–2026	Succeeded by Charles Beauclerk
