= George S. Stuart =

American sculptor (1929–2025)

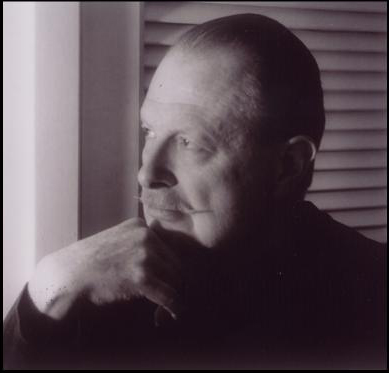
- 2010
- Born: 1929
- Died: August 15, 2025 (aged 95–96); Ojai, California U.S.
- Occupations: Artist, raconteur, historian
- Known for: Sculpting
- Notable work: Gallery of Historical Figures, Museum of Ventura County, Ventura, California, U.S.

George Stuart (1929 – August 15, 2025) was an American sculptor, raconteur and historian.

He traveled the United States presenting historical monologues about the last four centuries in the Americas, Europe, Russia and China. To help audiences visualize the personalities in his monologues, Stuart created over four hundred historically accurate, quarter-life-size sculptures of personages with political influence from the 16th to the 19th century.

His works have been exhibited in the Smithsonian Institution and Clinton Presidential Library as well as at other museums and libraries throughout the United States.

== Early career ==
As a young boy, Stuart traveled to Europe and became increasingly interested in historical architecture. In his teens, he constructed a scale model of the French Palace of Versailles and began to experiment with the human form after receiving an articulated marionette as a gift. Illness deterred him for a time, but he persisted and enrolled in first Georgetown University then the American University in Washington, D.C. where he studied history, economics, languages and international law to prepare to become a Foreign Service officer. But his academic career was frustrated by dyslexia, a condition not recognized in those days.

Then, in the early 1950s, he was offered a position at the Smithsonian Institution, where he sculpted figures of inventors to accompany patent models exhibited there. As a member of the Smithsonian staff, he also participated in the development of the Presidents' Wives exhibit.

After Stuart completed a degree in Fine Arts at the University of California, Santa Barbara, where he found himself drawn to theater arts, he began touring the country performing historical monologues accompanied by eight to twelve of his figures. He was represented by the Samuel Horton Brown Agency in Beverly Hills, joining the firm's other clients, including cultural anthropologist Margaret Mead. Focusing on power and political intrigue, Stuart developed over twenty programs using his historical figures as visual aids.

When Stuart moved to Ojai, California, in 1959, he opened The Gallery of Historical Figures and began teaching workshops on figural construction, costuming and sculpting faces. In 1991, the city of Ojai presented Stuart with its Lifetime Achievement in the Arts award. He was recognized by the United States Congress.

== "Historical Figures" ==
Each of his historical figures began with a jointed iron-wire skeleton in quarter scale that is designed to move like the treasured marionette from Stuart's childhood. The head was modeled separately, beginning with a skull structure built up with clay then molded in plastic. The facial features were defined using a jeweler's loupe and fine instruments. Blown glass eyes were then inserted from the inside. The body was then built up with papier-mâché, cotton fiber, and styrofoam enclosed with wool-felt skin. After he chose an appropriate pose, the figure was then finished with a custom plastique that Stuart developed himself after years of experimentation to achieve the look of life-like skin.

He created more than four hundred "Historical Figures" in groups to complement his performances. The groups include:

- American Revolutionary and Civil Wars (Samuel Adams to Abraham Lincoln)
- English monarchs (Henry VII to Edward VII), Bourbon Dynasty (Henry IV to Charles X)
- Czarist Russia and the Soviet Union (Ivan IV to Joseph Stalin)
- Manchu Dynasty (Nurhaci to Mao Tse-tung)
- Renaissance & Reformation (various rulers and clergy)
- Conquest of the Americas (Christopher Columbus to John Fremont)
- Really Awful People (including Hitler, Stalin, Mao, Attila the Hun, Vlad the Impaler, Nero, Ivan the Terrible, and the Borgias)
- Warriors of the Ages, Germanic Myth & Legend (northern pantheon)

and his earliest works.

One of his most popular presentations focused on history's "Really Awful People" group.

"The story begins with a massacre and ends with a slaughter," Stuart observed. "In between we have murder, rape, sex violence, intrigue and political chicanery."

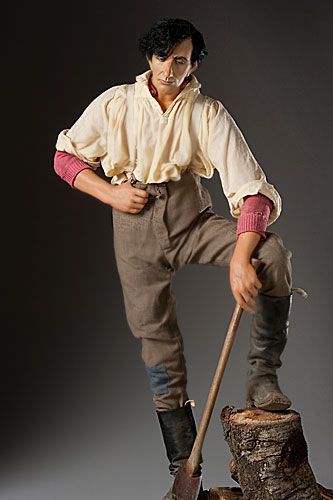
Abraham Lincoln circa 1832

Stuart reported his most popular figurines are those of Lincoln. He produced five different versions of Lincoln, from his early years to his appearance at the time of the sixteenth president's assassination. His figures from the American Revolutionary and Civil War periods were featured in the exhibit Revolution and Rebellion: Wars, Words and Figures" at the Clinton Presidential Library in September 2011.

Stuart's quest for historical accuracy led him to import specially scaled chain mail, embroidered silks, and Icelandic sheepskin for life-like hair. Stuart fabricated historically accurate metal helmets, armor, weapons, crowns, and accessories.

More than two hundred of Stuart's Historical Figures now reside in the permanent collections of the Museum of Ventura County in Ventura, California, where a special gallery was constructed for their display. Other figures are in the collections of the Naples Museum of Art in Naples, Florida. Temporary exhibits have been held at the Pasadena Museum of History, the Ojai Valley Museum of History and Art, the Oxnard Library, California State University, and the Clinton Presidential Library.

== Death ==
Stuart died at his home in Ojai, California, on August 15, 2025.

== Gallery ==
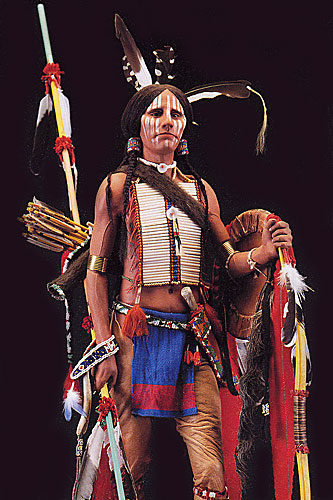
Comanche Warrior

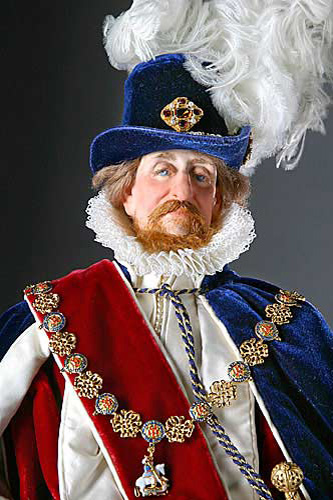
James I

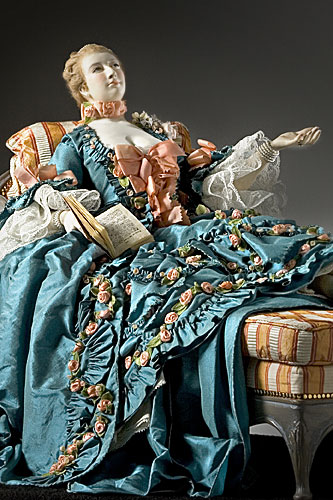
Jeanne Antoinette Poisson, Madame de Pompadour

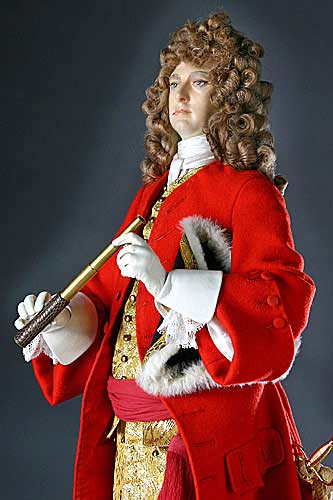
John Churchill, 1st Duke of Marlborough

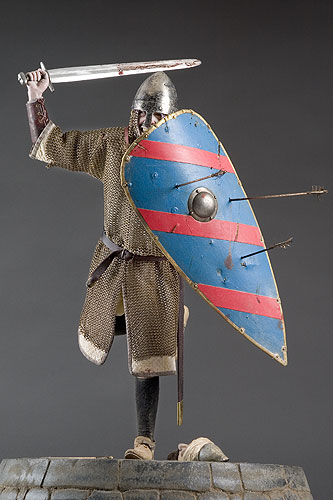
Norman Knight

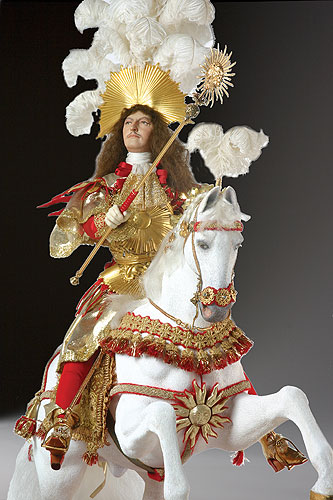
French King Louis XIV

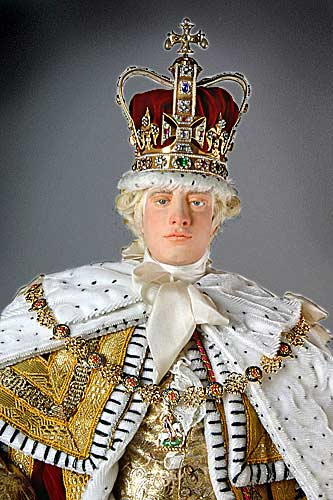
King George III in Robes of State

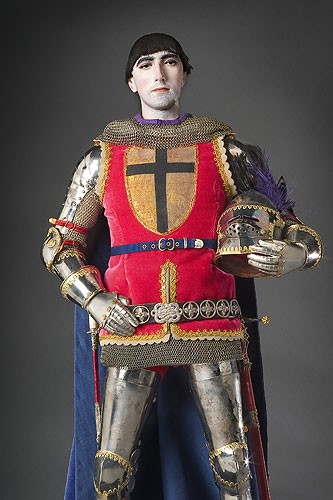
Gilles de Retz

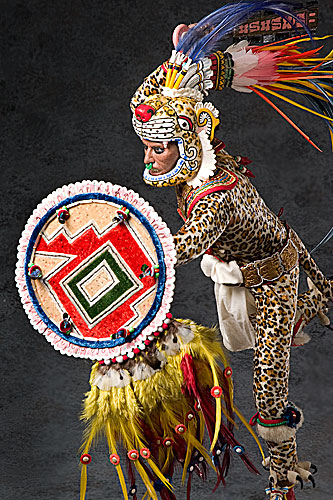
Aztec Leopard Warrior

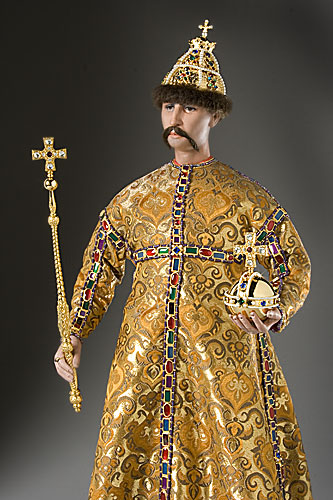
Tsar Boris Godunov

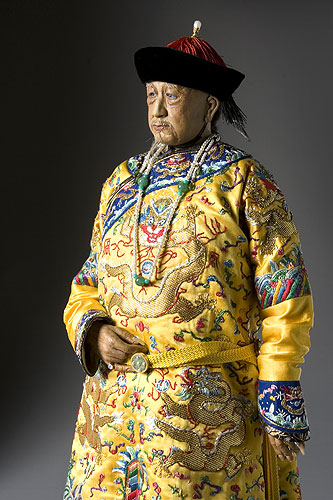
Chinese Emperor Chien Lung

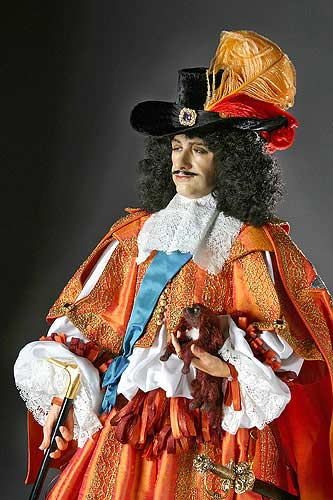
King Charles II

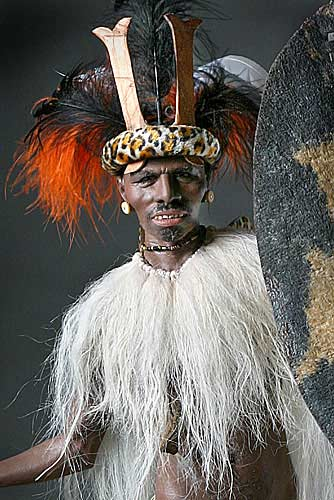
Zulu Warrior

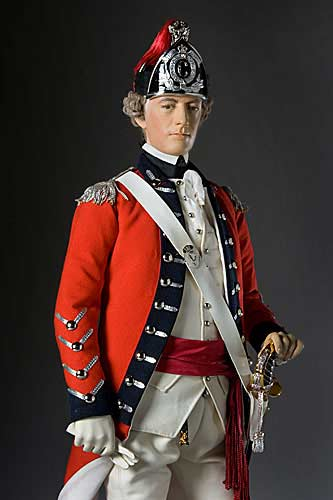
Sir John Burgoyne

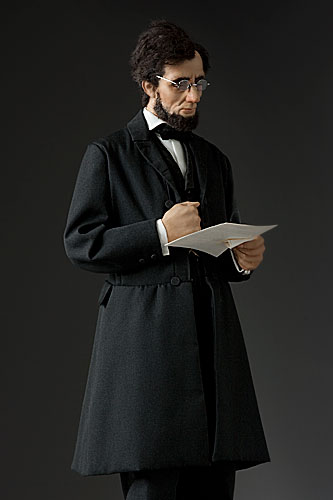
Abraham Lincoln

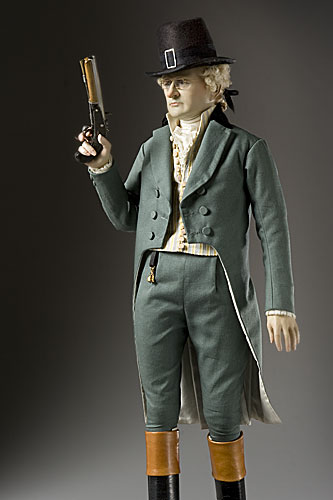
Alexander Hamilton

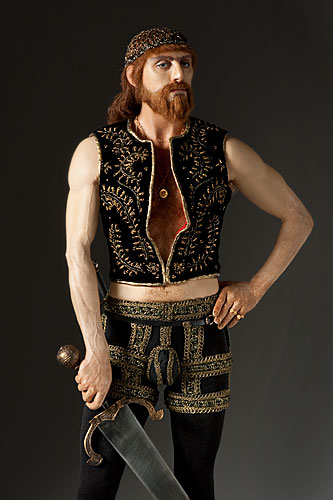
Cesare Borgia

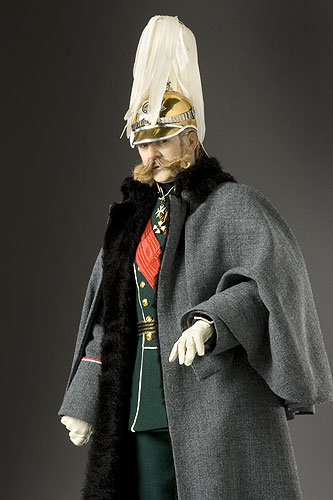
Alexander II Nikolaevitch

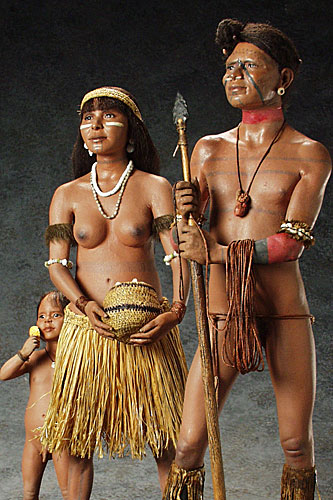
Chumash Family

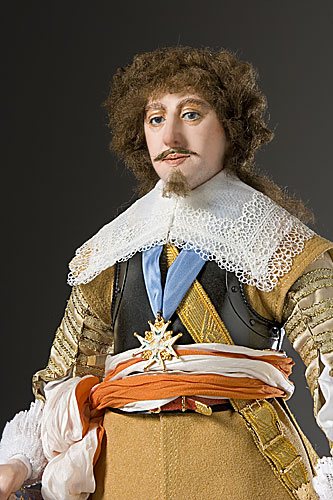
Gaston, Duke of Orléans

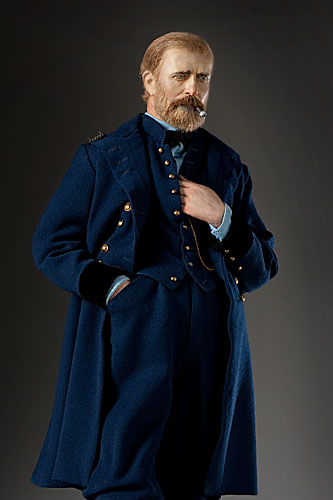
General Ulysses S. Grant

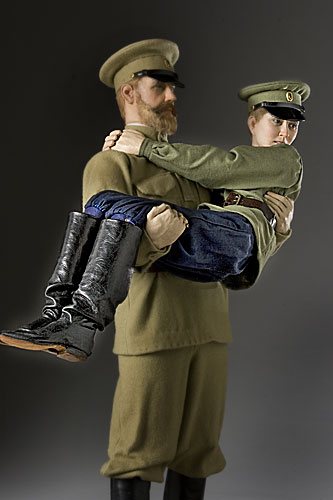
Tsar Nicholas II Romanov and Tsarevich Alexei

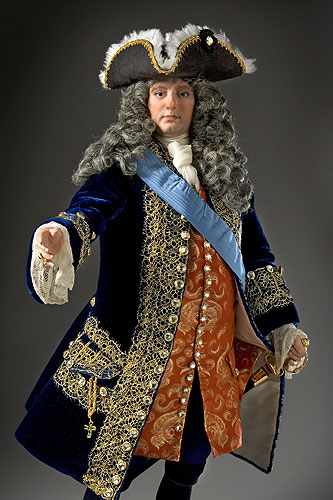
Regent Philippe d'Orleans

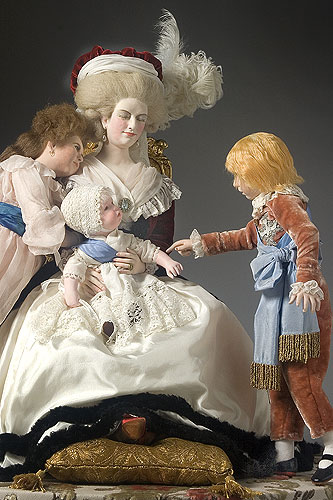
Queen Marie Antoinette with her children

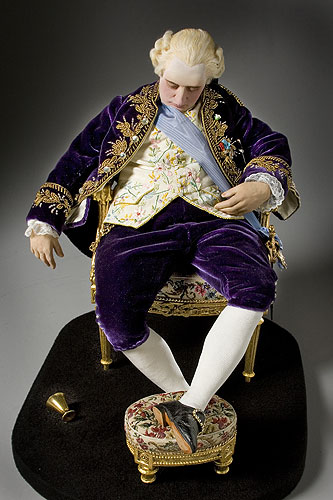
King Louis XVI in 1780

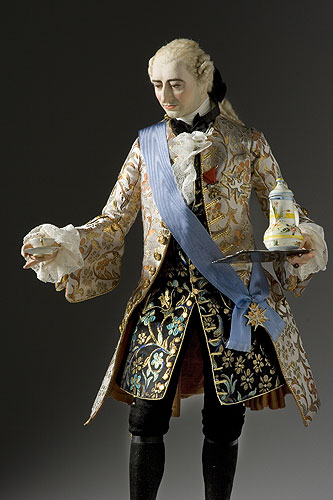
King Louis XV in 1745

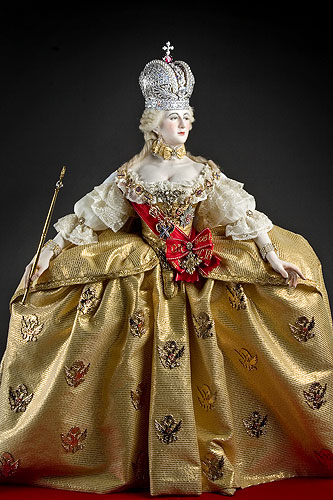
Empress Catherine II of Russia

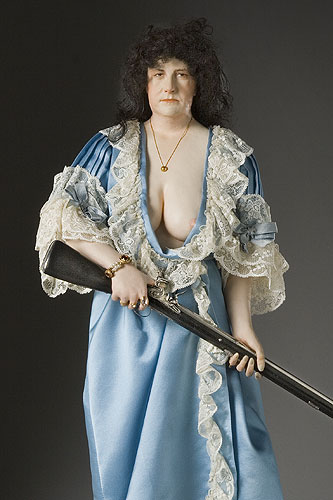
Russian Empress Anna Ivanova

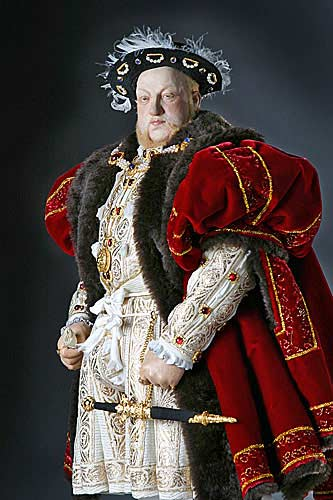
King Henry VIII

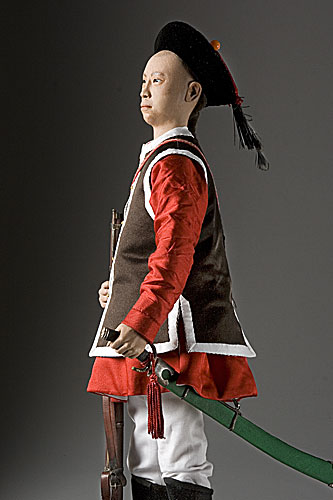
Chinese Bannerman

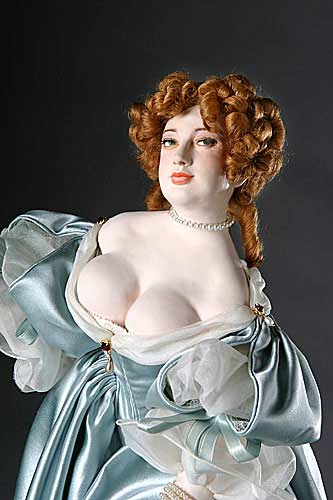
Nell Gwyn

== Related publications ==
- Green, Lee (2004). George Stuart's Historical Figures. Ventura County Museum of History and Art. ISBN 0-9729361-2-2.
- Kettmann, Kevin (2004). "The Art of History, The Fascinating Figurines of George Stuart". Ventura Magazine (Fall).
