= John Fitzwilliam (British Army officer) =

British Army officer

General The Honourable John Fitzwilliam
- Born: 1714
- Died: 31 July 1789 (aged 74–75)
- Military career
- Allegiance: Kingdom of Great Britain
- Branch: British Army
- Rank: General

General John Fitzwilliam (1714 – 31 July 1789) was a British Army officer.

== Biography ==
He was baptised on 28 March 1714, the third son of Richard Fitzwilliam, 5th Viscount Fitzwilliam and his wife Frances, daughter of Sir John Shelley, 3rd Baronet. In 1724 he attended Westminster School, and he served as a page of honour to the Prince of Wales, later King George II.

Fitzwilliam entered the Army as a cornet in the Royal Horse Guards on 20 April 1732, and was promoted to lieutenant in 1739. In 1745 he was made a captain in the 1st Regiment of Foot Guards, with the rank of lieutenant-colonel in the Army, and in 1746 he was made a groom of the bedchamber to the Duke of Cumberland. He served on Cumberland's staff in Flanders in 1747, and in 1754 was returned to Parliament on the prince's interest as member for New Windsor.

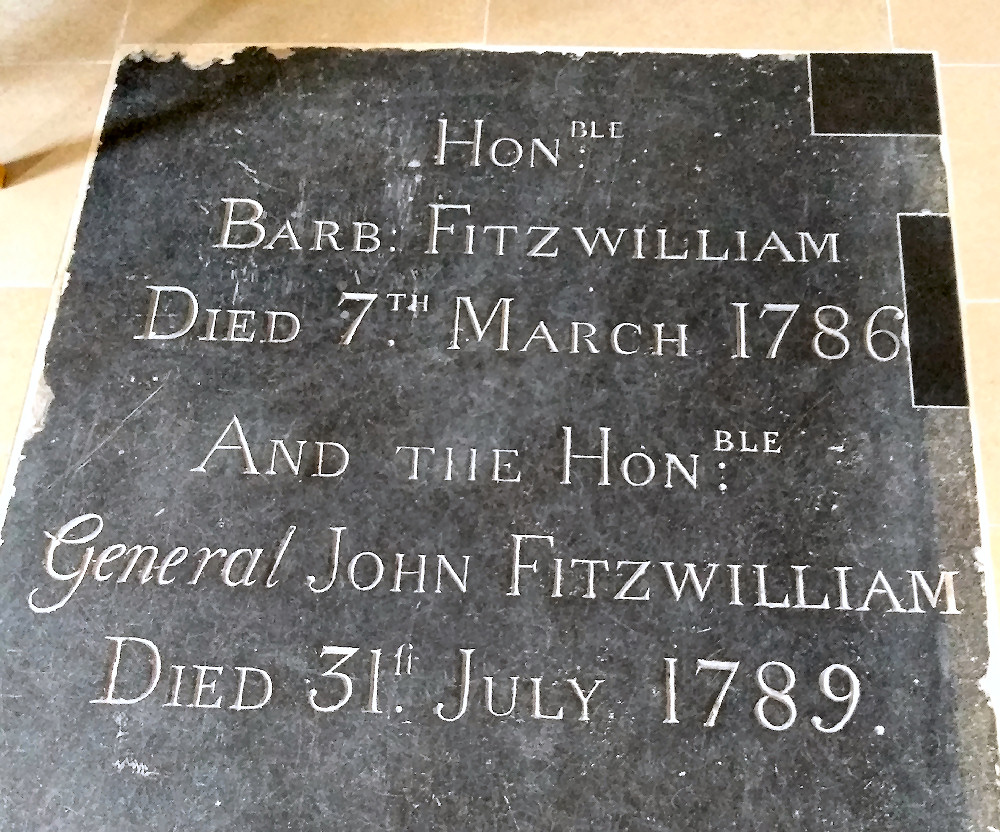
St Mary Magdalene's, Richmond

On 12 November 1755 Fitzwilliam was made colonel of the 2nd (The Queen's Royal) Regiment of Foot, and he was promoted to major-general in June 1759. On 27 November 1760 he was transferred to the colonelcy of the 2nd Irish Horse, and he was promoted to lieutenant-general the following year. The Duke of Cumberland died in 1766, and Fitzwilliam did not stand in the general election of 1768. He was promoted to general in 1778.

On 17 October 1751 Fitzwilliam married Barbara, widow of William Cavendish and daughter of Edward Chandler, Bishop of Durham; they had no children.

Parliament of Great Britain
Preceded by Henry Fox; Lord George Beauclerk	Member of Parliament for New Windsor; 1754–1768; With: Henry Fox 1754–1761; Augustus Keppel 1761–1768	Succeeded by Augustus Keppel; Lord George Beauclerk
Military offices
Preceded by Thomas Fowke	Colonel of the 2nd (The Queen's Royal) Regiment of Foot; 1755–1760	Succeeded by Sir Charles Montagu
Preceded by The Earl Waldegrave	Colonel of the 2nd Regiment of Horse (from 1788, the 5th Regiment of Dragoon Guards); 1760–1789	Succeeded by John Douglas
