= 79 Pall Mall =

Coordinates: 51°30′21″N 0°08′10″W

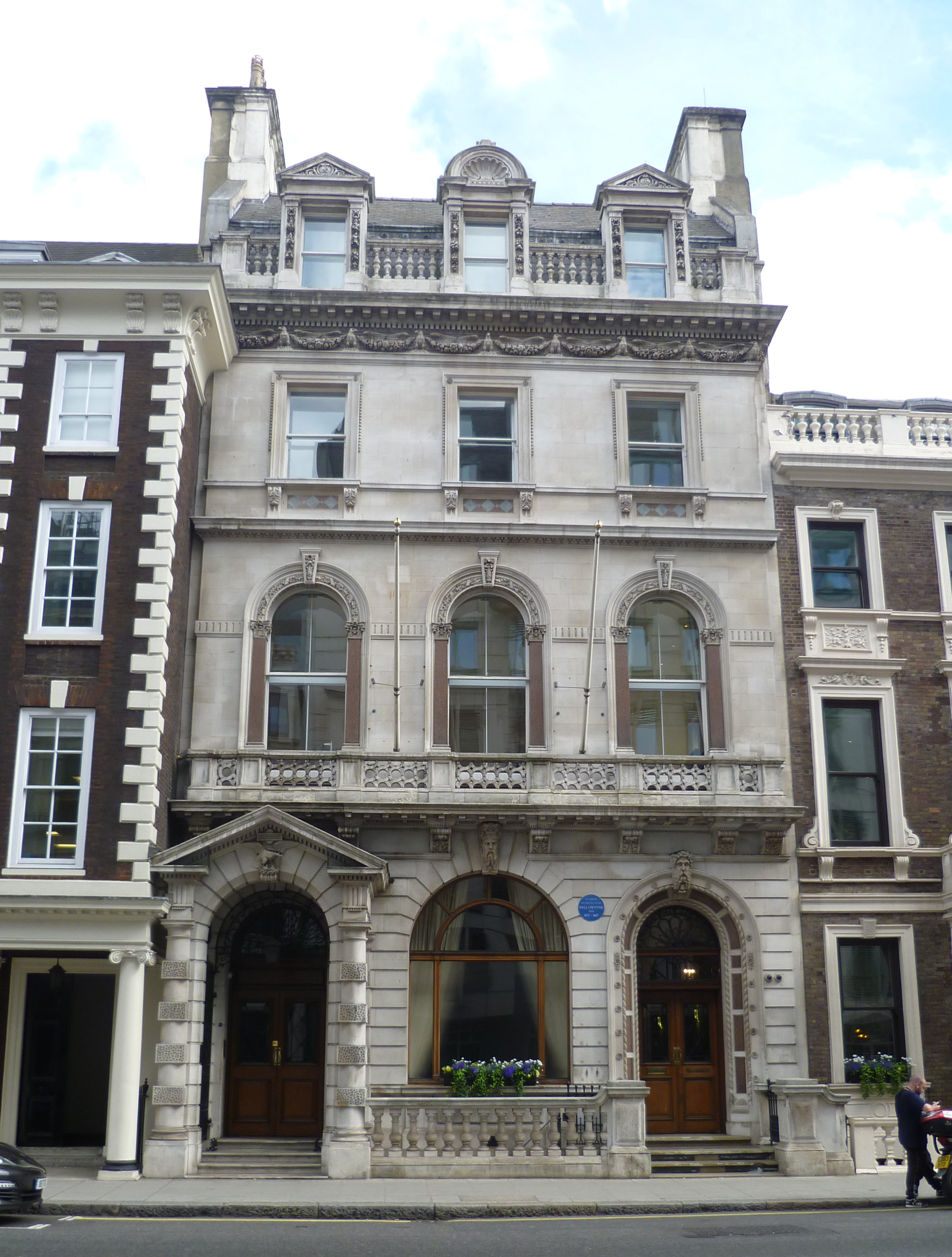
79 Pall Mall

79 Pall Mall is a grade II listed building in Pall Mall, London. It was designed by David Brandon for the Eagle Insurance Company in 1866–68. There formerly stood on the site a brick townhouse occupied by Nell Gwynne after her retirement from the stage and a blue plaque notes the fact.
