= George Beauclerk, 3rd Duke of St Albans =

British Aristocrat (1730-1786)

The Duke of St Albans

Duke of St Albans
- In office 1751–1786
- Preceded by: Charles Beauclerk
- Succeeded by: George Beauclerk

Lord Lieutenant of Berkshire
- In office 1751–1761
- Preceded by: The Duke of St Albans
- Succeeded by: The Lord Vere

Lord Lieutenant of Berkshire
- In office 1771–1786
- Preceded by: The Lord Vere
- Succeeded by: The Lord Craven

Personal details
- Born: 25 June 1730
- Died: 1 February 1786 (aged 55) Brussels
- Spouse: Jane Roberts (m. 1752; died 1778)
- Parents: Charles Beauclerk, 2nd Duke of St Albans (father); Lucy Werden (mother)

George Beauclerk, 3rd Duke of St Albans (25 June 1730 – 1 February 1786), styled Earl of Burford until 1751, was a British peer.

== Early life ==
He was the son of Charles Beauclerk, 2nd Duke of St Albans, and his wife, Lucy Werden. His paternal grandfather, Charles Beauclerk, 1st Duke of St Albans, was an illegitimate son of King Charles II of England by his mistress Nell Gwynne. Burford was educated at Eton College from 1742 to 1748.

== Marriage ==
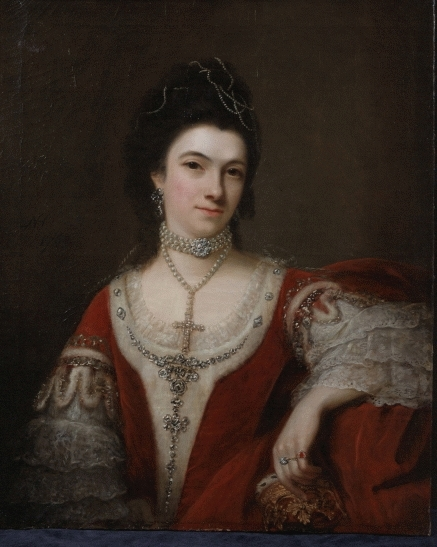
Jane Beauclerk, Duchess of St Albans (in 1768) by Nathaniel Hone the Elder (1718–1784)

On 23 December 1752 at St George's, Hanover Square, in London, Beauclerk married Jane Roberts (d. 16 Dec 1778), daughter and heiress of Sir Walter Roberts, 6th Baronet of Glassenbury (1691–1745), and his wife, Elizabeth Slaughter (only daughter and heiress of William Slaughter, of Rochester, county Kent). Jane Roberts died on 16 December 1778 without issue. On Beauclerk's death in 1786, his titles passed to his second cousin George Beauclerk.

He was High Steward of Windsor in 1751, a Lord of the Bedchamber in the same year, and Lord Lieutenant of Berkshire from 1751 to 1760 and again from 1771 to 1786. He died in Brussels.

Honorary titles
Preceded by The Duke of St Albans	Lord Lieutenant of Berkshire; 1751–1761	Succeeded by The Lord Vere
Preceded by The Lord Vere	Lord Lieutenant of Berkshire; 1771–1786	Succeeded by The Lord Craven
Peerage of England
Preceded by Charles Beauclerk	Duke of St Albans; 1751–1786	Succeeded by George Beauclerk
