= Nell Gwyn =

English royal mistress and actress (1650–1687)

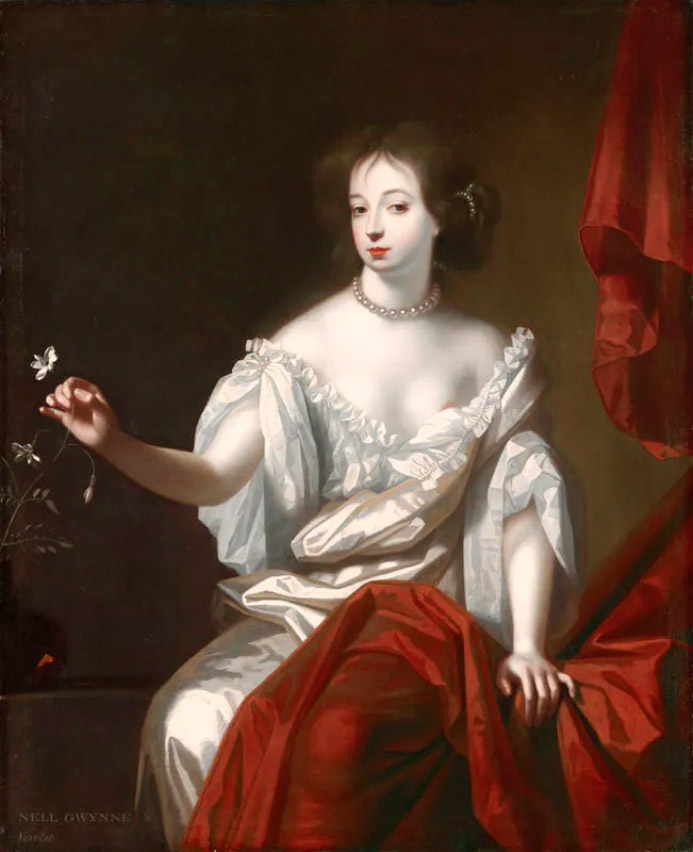
- Portrait by Simon Pietersz Verelst
- Born: Eleanor Gwyn; 2 February 1650; Hereford or St Martin in the Fields, City and Liberty of Westminster (disputed; see § Early life), Commonwealth of England
- Died: 14 November 1687 (aged 37); Pall Mall, Liberty of Westminster, Kingdom of England
- Other names: "Pretty, witty Nell"; William Nell
- Occupation: Actress
- Partner: Charles II of England
- Children: Charles Beauclerk, 1st Duke of St Albans; James Beauclerk, Lord Beauclerk
- Parents: Thos (Thomas) Guine (father); Ellen Gwyn (mother)

Eleanor Gwyn (also spelled Gwynn, Gwynne, Gwin; 2 February 1650 – 14 November 1687) was an English stage actress and celebrity figure of the Restoration period. Praised by Samuel Pepys for her comic performances as one of the first actresses on the English stage, she became best known for being a longtime mistress of King Charles II of England.

Called "pretty, witty Nell" by Pepys, she has been regarded as a living embodiment of the spirit of Restoration England, and has come to be considered a folk heroine, with a story echoing the rags-to-royalty tale of Cinderella. Gwyn had two sons by King Charles: Charles Beauclerk (1670–1726) and James Beauclerk (1671–1680). Charles Beauclerk was created Earl of Burford and Duke of St Albans; Murray Beauclerk, 14th Duke of St Albans was her descendant.

== Early life ==
The details of Gwyn's background are somewhat obscure. A horoscope in the Ashmolean manuscripts gives her date of birth as 2 February 1650. On the other hand, an account published in The New Monthly Magazine and Humorist in 1838 states that she was born about 1642. The earlier date of birth was asserted without documentation, but various scholars have supported both the earlier and later dates. The eight-year difference between these two possible birth years can offer different readings of what Gwyn achieved during her lifetime.

The obscurity surrounding her date of birth parallels numerous other obscurities that run through the course of her life. The information we have about Gwyn is collected from various sources, including the plays she starred in, satirical poetry and pictures, diaries, and letters. As such, much of this information is founded on hearsay, gossip, and rumour, and must therefore be handled with caution.

Her mother Ellen (or a variant, being referred to in her lifetime as "Old Madam", "Madam Gwyn" and "Old Ma Gwyn") was born, according to a monumental inscription, in the parish of St Martin in the Fields, which stretched from Soho and Covent Garden to beyond Mayfair, and is thought to have lived most of her life there in the West End. Most of her biographers believe her to have been "low-born". Her descendant and biographer Charles Beauclerk calls this conjecture, based solely on what is known of her later life. Madam Gwyn is sometimes said to have had the maiden surname Smith. This appears to be derived from a fragmentary pedigree by Anthony Wood that shows signs of confusion between different Gwyn families and it has not been firmly established. Nell's mother is said to have drowned when she fell into the water at her house near Chelsea. She was buried on 30 July 1679, in her 56th year, at St Martin-in-the-Fields.

Nell Gwyn is reported in a manuscript of 1688 to have been a daughter of "Tho^{s} [Thomas] Guine a Cap^{t} [captain] of ane antient fammilie in Wales", but the statement is doubtful as its author does not seem to have hesitated to create or alter details where the facts were unknown or perhaps unremarkable. There is some suggestion, from a poem dated to 1681, again of doubtful accuracy, that Gwyn's father died at Oxford, perhaps in prison. It has been proposed, based on the pedigree by Anthony Wood, that Gwyn was a granddaughter of Edmund Gwyn, Canon of Christ Church from 1615 to 1624. But administration records show that Edmund Gwyn died unmarried. Moreover, Wood did not give a forename for Gwyn's supposed grandfather and there are reasons to think that the "Dr ... Gwyn" in the pedigree was intended to be not Edmund Gwyn but rather his brother Matthew. In either case, the available evidence indicates that Nell Gwyn was not a member of their family.

Gwyn was assigned arms similar to those of the Gwynnes of Llansannor, but her specific connection to that family, if any, is unknown.

Three cities make the claim to be Gwyn's birthplace: Hereford, London (specifically Covent Garden) and Oxford. Evidence for any of the three is scarce. The fact that "Gwyn" is a name of Welsh origin might support Hereford, as its county is on the border with Wales; the Dictionary of National Biography notes a traditional belief that she was born there in Pipe Well Lane, renamed Gwynne Street in the 19th century. There is also the legend that Nell Gwyn chose red coats for the pensioners of Chelsea Hospital, which she allegedly influenced King Charles to found, because she remembered that similar coats had been worn at Coningsby Hospital in Hereford. London is the simplest choice, perhaps, since Gwyn's mother was born there and that is where she raised her children. Alexander Smith's 1715 Lives of the Court Beauties says she was born in Coal Yard Alley in Covent Garden and other biographies, including Wilson's, have followed suit. Her noble descendant Beauclerk pieces together circumstantial evidence to favour an Oxford birth.

One way or another, Gwyn's father seems to have been out of the picture by the time of her childhood in Covent Garden, and her "dipsomaniac mother, [and] notorious sister", Rose, were left in a low situation. She experimented with cross-dressing between 1663 and 1667, going under the name "William Nell" and adopting a false beard; her observations informed a most successful and hilarious character interpretation acting as a man on the stage in March 1667. Old Madam Gwyn was by most accounts an alcoholic whose business was running a bawdy house (or brothel). There, or in the bawdy house of one Madam Ross, Nell spent at least some time. It is possible that she herself was a child prostitute; Peter Thomson, in the Oxford Illustrated History of Theatre, says it is "probable". But a rare mention of her upbringing from the source herself might be seen to contradict the idea. A 1667 entry in Pepys's diary records, second-hand, that:

Here Mrs. Pierce tells me ... that Nelly and Beck Marshall, falling out the other day, the latter called the other my Lord Buckhurst's whore. Nell answered then, "I was but one man's whore, though I was brought up in a bawdy-house to fill strong waters to the guests; and you are a whore to three or four, though a Presbyter's praying daughter!"

It is not out of the question that Gwyn was merely echoing the satirists of the day, if she said this at all.

Various anonymous verses are the only other sources describing her childhood occupations: bawdyhouse servant, street hawker of herring, oysters, or turnips, and cinder-girl have all been put forth. Tradition has her growing up in Coal Yard Alley, a poor slum off Drury Lane.

Around 1662, Nell is said to have taken a lover by the name of Duncan or Dungan. Their relationship lasted perhaps two years, and was reported with obscenity-laced acidity in several later satires; "For either with expense of purse or p---k, / At length the weary fool grew Nelly-sick". Duncan provided Gwyn with rooms at a tavern in Maypole Alley, and the satires also say he was involved in securing Nell a job at the theatre being built nearby.

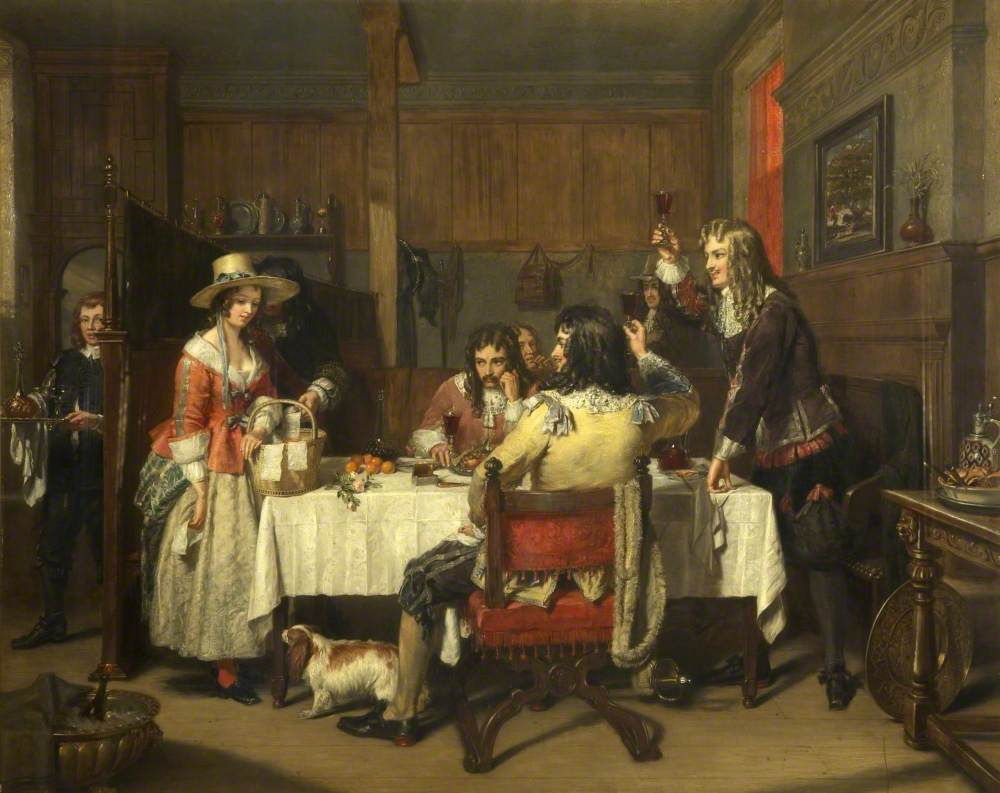
Nell Gwynn at the Tavern by Charles Landseer, 1840

During the English Commonwealth era, pastimes regarded as frivolous, including theatre, had been banned. Charles II had been restored to the English throne in 1660, and he reinstated the theatre. One of his early acts as king was to license the formation of two acting companies and to legalise acting as a profession for women. In 1663, the King's Company, led by Thomas Killigrew, opened a new playhouse, the Theatre in Bridges/Brydges Street, which was later rebuilt and renamed the Theatre Royal, Drury Lane.

Mary Meggs, a former prostitute nicknamed "Orange Moll" and a friend of Madam Gwyn's, had been granted the licence to "vend, utter and sell oranges, lemons, fruit, sweetmeats and all manner of fruiterers and confectioners wares" within the theatre. Orange Moll hired Nell and her elder sister Rose as scantily-clad "orange-girls", selling small, sweet "china" oranges to the audience inside the theatre for a sixpence each. The work exposed her to the theatre and to London's higher society: this was "the King's playhouse", and King Charles frequently attended performances. The orange-girls also served as messengers between men in the audience and actresses backstage; they received tips for this role, and some of these messages ended in sexual assignations. Whether this activity rose to the level of pimping may be a matter of semantics.

== Actress ==
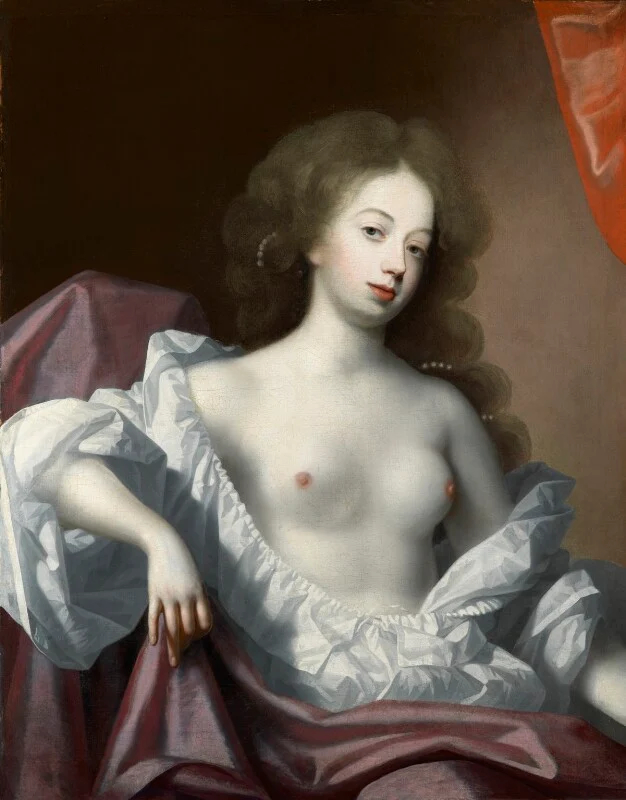
Portrait of Nell Gwyn by Simon Pietersz Verelst, c. 1670

The new theatres were the first in England to feature actresses; earlier, women's parts had been played by boys or men. Gwyn joined the rank of actresses at Bridges Street when she was 14 (if we take her birth year to be 1650), less than a year after becoming an orange-girl.

If her good looks, strong clear voice, and lively wit were responsible for catching Killigrew's eye, she still had to prove herself clever enough to succeed as an actress. This was no easy task in the Restoration theatre; the limited pool of audience members meant that very short runs were the norm for plays and 50 different productions might be mounted in the nine-month season lasting from September to June. She was reputed to have been illiterate.

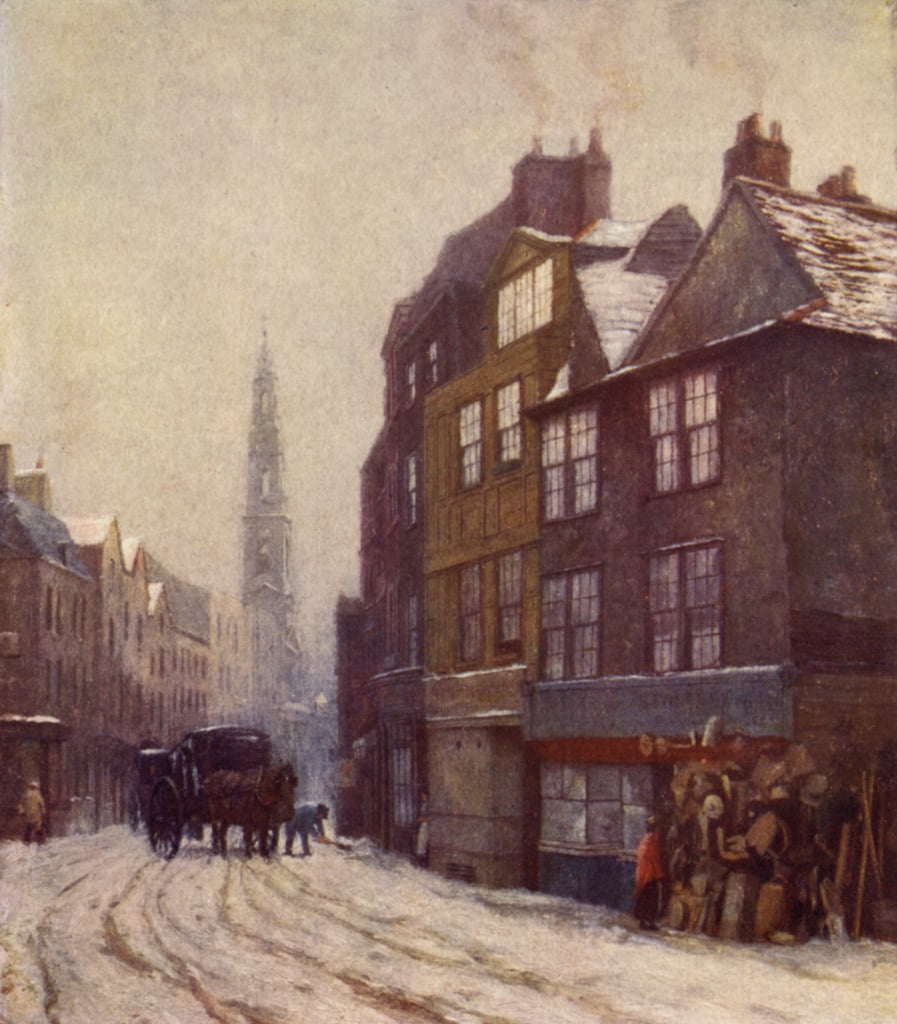
Nell Gwyn's Lodging, Drury Lane, February 1881 by Philip Norman

She was taught her craft of performing at a school for young actors developed by Killigrew and one of the fine male actors of the time, Charles Hart, and learned dancing from another, John Lacy; both were rumoured by satirists of the time to be her lovers, but if she had such a relationship with Lacy (Beauclerk thinks it unlikely), it was kept much more discreet than her well-known affair with Hart.

Much as in the dispute over her date of birth, it is unclear when Gwyn began to perform professionally on the Restoration stage. It is possible that she first appeared in smaller parts during the 1664–65 season. For example, The Bodleian Manuscript of The Siege of Urbin has the part of Pedro (Melina, a maid servant in breeches) played by a "Mrs Nell". Additionally, "Nelle" was intended to play the small role of Paulina, a courtesan, in Killigrew's Thomaso, or The Wanderer in November 1664, but the play seems to have been cancelled. The use of "Mrs" would imply that Gwyn was more likely born in 1642 than 1650 as it indicates an actress over the age of 21 (not her marital status) for which certain roles would be more suitable. Nonetheless, since players of less substantial parts are seldom mentioned in cast lists or playgoers' diaries of the period, an absolute date for Gwyn's debut cannot be ascertained.

Whatever her first role as an actress may have been, it is evident that she had become a more prominent actress by 1665. It is around this time when she is first mentioned in Samuel Pepys' diary, specifically on 3 April 1665, while attending a play, where the description "pretty, witty Nell" is first recorded. This unusual use of only her first name implies that Gwyn had made herself known both on the stage and off as her celebrity status started to emerge. Her first recorded appearance onstage was in March 1665, in John Dryden's heroic drama The Indian Emperour, playing Cydaria, daughter of Moctezuma and love interest to Cortez, played by her real-life lover Charles Hart.

Pepys, whose diary usually has great things to say about Gwyn, was displeased with her performance in this same part two years later: "to the King's playhouse, and there saw 'The Indian Emperour'; where I find Nell come again, which I am glad of; but was most infinitely displeased with her being put to act the Emperour's daughter; which is a great and serious part, which she do most basely".

Gwyn seems to have agreed that drama did not suit her, judging by the lines she was later made to say in the epilogue to a Robert Howard drama:

We have been all ill-us'd, by this day's poet.
'Tis our joint cause; I know you in your hearts
Hate serious plays, as I do serious parts.

It was in the new form of restoration comedy that Gwyn became a star. In May 1665, she appeared opposite Hart in James Howard's comedy All Mistaken, or the Mad Couple.

There is some debate over the year The Mad Couple debuted, with earlier authorities believing it to be 1667. This was the first of many appearances in which Gwyn and Hart played the "gay couple", a form that would become a frequent theme in restoration comedies. The gay couple, broadly defined, is a pair of witty, antagonistic lovers, he generally a rake fearing the entrapment of marriage and she feigning to do the same in order to keep her lover at arm's length. Theatre historian Elizabeth Howe credits the gay couple's enduring success on the Restoration stage entirely to "the talent and popularity of a single actress, Nell Gwyn".

The Great Plague of London shut down the Bridges Street theatre, along with most of the city, from mid-1665 until late 1666. Gwyn and her mother spent some of this time in Oxford, following the King and his court. The King's Company is presumed to have mounted some private theatrical entertainments for the court during this time away from the virulent capital. Gwyn and the other ten "women comedians in His Majesty's Theatre" were issued the right (and the cloth) to wear the King's livery at the start of this exile, proclaiming them official servants of the King.

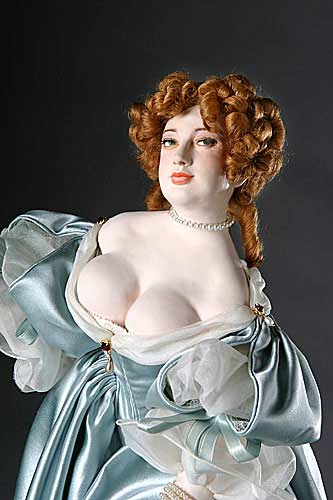
Later depiction of Gwyn by George S. Stuart

After the theatres reopened, Gwyn and Hart returned to play role after role that fit the mould of the gay couple, including in Howard's The English Monsieur (December 1666), Richard Rhodes' Flora's Vagaries, an adaptation of John Fletcher's The Chances by George Villiers, and their greatest success, Secret Love, or The Maiden Queen.

This play, a tragicomedy by the theatre's house dramatist, John Dryden, was performed in March 1667. It was a great success: King Charles "graced it with the Title of His Play" and Pepys's praise was effusive:

to the King's house to see "The Maiden Queen", a new play of Dryden's, mightily commended for the regularity of it, and the strain and wit; and the truth is, there is a comical part done by Nell, which is Florimell, that I never can hope ever to see the like done again, by man or woman. The King and the Duke of York were at the play. But so great performance of a comical part was never, I believe, in the world before as Nell do this, both as a mad girl, then most and best of all when she comes in like a young gallant; and hath the notions and carriage of a spark the most that ever I saw any man have. It makes me, I confess, admire her.

After seeing the play for the third time, Pepys writes, "It is impossible to have Florimel's part, which is the most comical that ever was made for woman, ever done better than it is by Nelly." Killigrew must have agreed with Pepys; once Gwyn left the acting profession, it was at least ten years before his company revived The Maiden Queen and even the less favoured The Indian Emperour because "the management evidently felt that it would be useless to present these plays without her".

The Maiden Queen featured breeches roles, where an actress appeared in men's clothes under one pretence or another, and as Bax supposes "was one of the first occasions upon which a woman appeared in the disguise of a man"; if nothing else this could draw an audience eager to see women show off their figures in the more form-fitting male attire. The attraction had another dynamic: the theatres sometimes had a hard time holding onto their actresses, as they were swept up to become kept mistresses of the aristocracy. In 1667, Gwyn made such a match with Charles Sackville, titled Lord Buckhurst at that time. She supposedly caught his eye during an April performance of All Mistaken, or The Mad Couple, especially in one scene in which, to escape a hugely fat suitor able to move only by rolling, she rolls across the stage herself, her feet toward the audience and her petticoats flying about. A satire of the time describes this and also Hart's position in the face of competition from the upper echelons of society:

Yet Hart more manners had, then not to tender
When noble Buckhurst beg'd him to surrender.
He saw her roll the stage from side to side
And, through her drawers the powerful charm descry'd.

Beauclerk describes Buckhurst: "Cultured, witty, satirical, dissolute, and utterly charming". He was one of a handful of court wits, the "Merry Gang" as named by Andrew Marvell. Sometime after the end of April and her last recorded role that season (in Robert Howard's The Surprisal), Gwyn and Buckhurst left London for a country holiday in Epsom, accompanied by Sir Charles Sedley, another wit in the merry gang. Pepys reports the news on 13 July: "[Mr. Pierce tells us] Lord Buckhurst hath got Nell away from the King's house, lies with her, and gives her £100 a year, so she hath sent her parts to the house, and will act no more." Gwyn was acting once more in late August, and her brief affair with Buckhurst had ended. Pepys reports that by 22 August 1667, Gwyn had returned to the King's Playhouse in The Indian Emperour. On 26 August, Pepys learns from Moll Davis that "Nell is already left by my Lord Buckhurst, and that he makes sport of her, and swears she hath had all she could get of him; and Hart, her great admirer, now hates her; and that she is very poor, and hath lost my Lady Castlemayne, who was her great friend also but she is come to the House, but is neglected by them all".

== Relationship with King Charles II ==
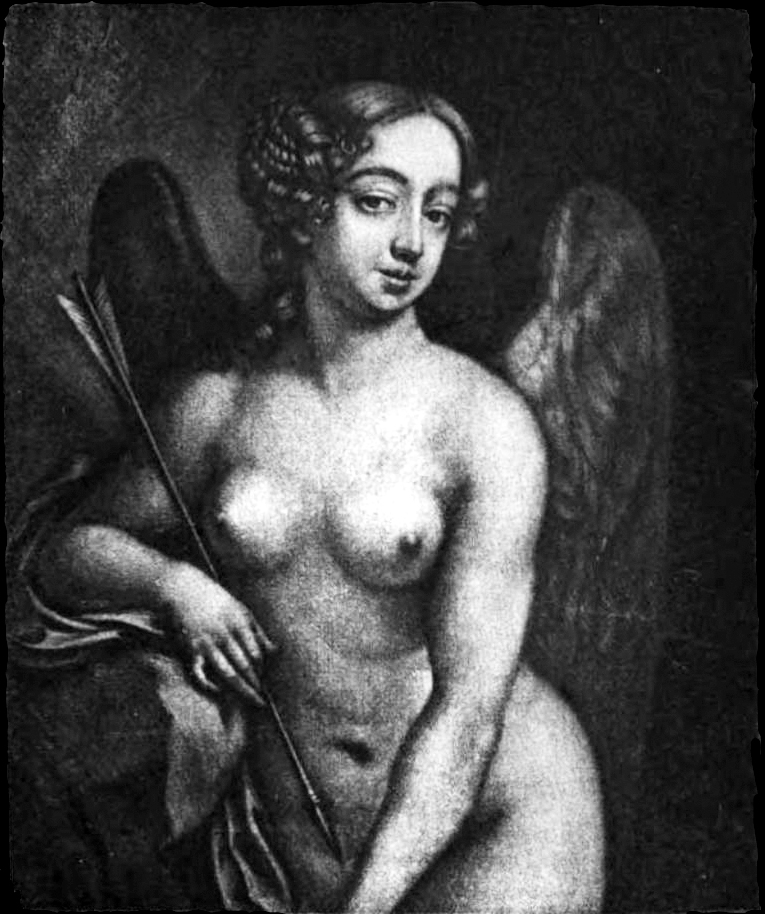
Nell Gwyn as Cupid, c. 1672; engraving by Richard Thomson, of a painting by Peter Cross. Pepys owned a copy of this engraving and displayed it over his desk at the Admiralty

Late in 1667, George Villiers, 2nd Duke of Buckingham, took on the role of unofficial manager for Gwyn's love affairs. He aimed to provide King Charles with someone who would supplant Barbara Palmer (Duchess of Cleveland and Countess of Castlemaine), his principal mistress and Buckingham's cousin, moving Buckingham closer to the King's ear. The plan failed; reportedly, Gwyn asked £500 a year to be kept and this was rejected as too expensive. Buckingham had an alternative plan, which was to set the King up with Moll Davis, an actress with the rival Duke's Company. Davis was Gwyn's first rival for the King. Several anonymous satires from the time relate a tale of Gwyn, with the help of her friend Aphra Behn, slipping a powerful laxative into Davis' tea-time cakes before an evening when she was expected in the King's bed.

The love affair between the King and Gwyn allegedly began in April 1668. Gwyn was attending a performance of George Etherege's She Wou'd if She Cou'd at the theatre in Lincoln's Inn Fields. In the next box was the King, who from accounts was more interested in flirting with Gwyn than watching the play. Charles invited Gwyn and her escort, Mr. Villiers, a cousin of Buckingham's, to supper along with his brother the Duke of York. The anecdote turns charming if perhaps apocryphal at this point: the King, after supper, discovered that he had no money on him; nor did his brother, and Gwyn had to foot the bill. "Od's fish!" she exclaimed, in an imitation of the King's manner of speaking, "but this is the poorest company I ever was in!"

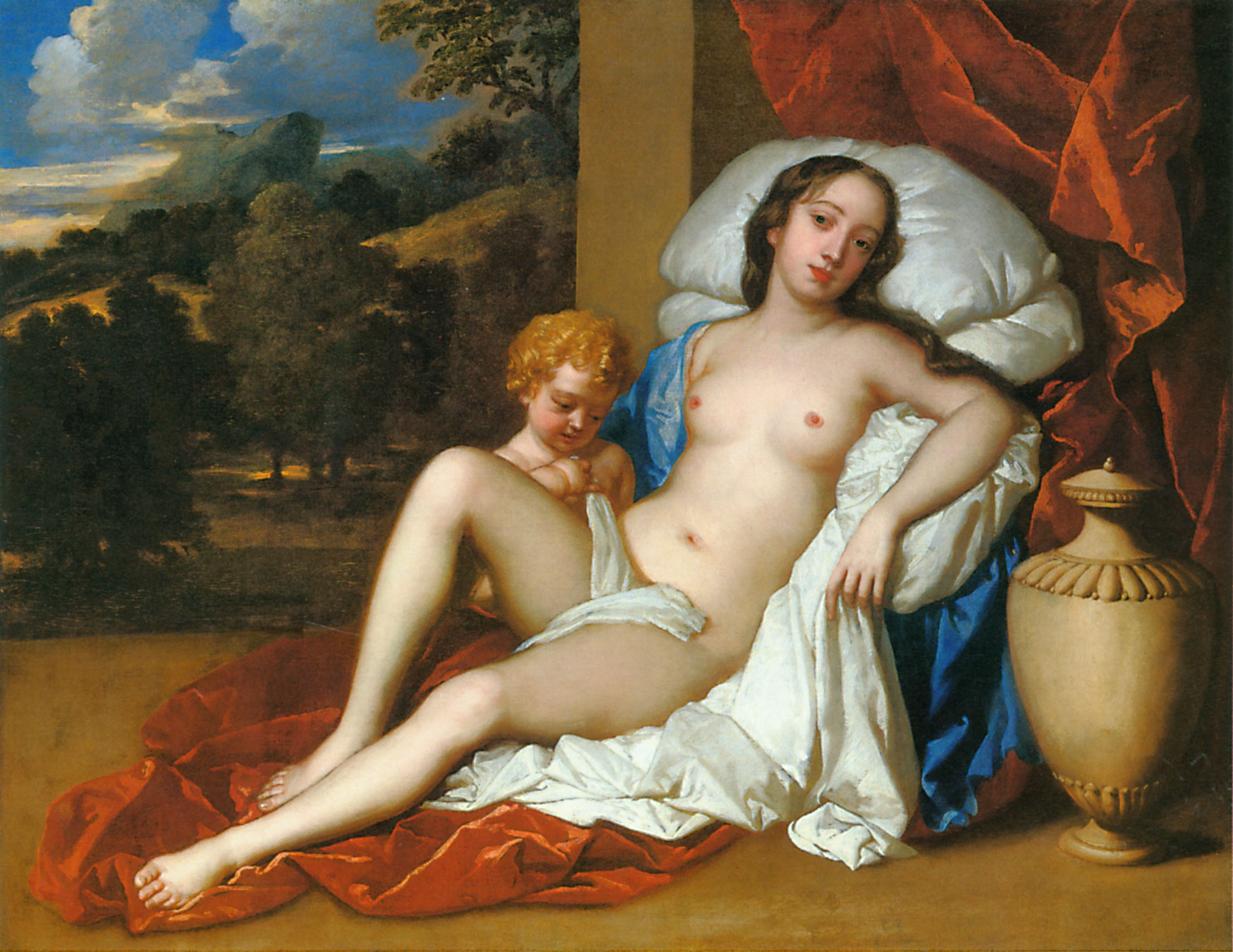
Portrait of Nell Gwyn as Venus with her son, Charles, as Cupid, by Peter Lely. Charles II had this hung behind a landscape, which he swung back to allow favoured guests to peer at

Having previously been the mistress of Charles Hart and Charles Sackville, Gwyn jokingly called the King "her Charles the Third". By mid-1668, Gwyn's affair with the King was well-known, though there was little reason to believe it would last long. She continued to act at the King's House, her new notoriety drawing larger crowds and encouraging the playwrights to craft more roles specifically for her. June 1668 found her in Dryden's An Evening's Love, or The Mock Astrologer, and in July she played in Lacy's The Old Troop, a farce about a company of Cavalier soldiers during the English Civil War, based on Lacy's own experiences. Possibly, Gwyn's father had served in the same company, and Gwyn's part — the company whore — was based on her own mother. As her commitment to the King increased, though, her acting career slowed, and she had no recorded parts between January and June 1669, when she played Valeria in Dryden's successful tragedy Tyrannick Love.

King Charles had a considerable number of mistresses during his life, both short affairs and committed arrangements. He also had a wife, Portuguese princess Catherine of Braganza, whose pregnancies all ended in miscarriages, and who had little or no say over the King's choice to have mistresses. This had come to a head shortly after their marriage in 1662, in a confrontation between Catherine and Barbara Palmer, which became known as the "Bedchamber crisis". Ostracised at court and with most of her retinue sent back to Portugal, Catherine had little choice but to acquiesce to the King's mistresses being granted semi-official standing.

During Gwyn's first years with Charles, there was little competition in the way of other mistresses: Barbara Palmer was on her way out, while others, such as Moll Davis, kept quietly away from the spotlight of public appearances or Whitehall. Gwyn gave birth to her first son fathered by Charles II, Charles Beauclerk, on 8 May 1670. He was the King's seventh son by five separate mistresses.

Several months later, Louise de Kérouaille (Duchess of Portsmouth) came to England from France, ostensibly to serve as a maid of honour to Queen Catherine, but also to become another mistress to King Charles, probably by design on both the French and English sides. She and Gwyn were rivals for many years to come. They were opposites in personality and mannerism; Louise a proud woman of noble birth used to the sophistication of Versailles, Gwyn a spirited and pranking ex-orange-wench. Gwyn nicknamed Louise "Squintabella" for her looks and the "Weeping Willow" for her tendency to sob. In one instance, recorded in a letter from George Legge to Lord Preston, Gwyn characteristically jabbed at the Duchess' "great lineage," dressing in black at court, the same mourning attire as Louise when a prince of France died. Someone there asked, "What the deuce was the Cham of Tartary to you?" to which Gwyn responded, "Oh, exactly the same relation that the French Prince was to Mademoiselle de Kérouaille." The Duchess of Portsmouth's only recorded riposte was, "anybody may know she has been an orange-wench by her swearing". Their relationship was not strictly adversarial; they were known to get together for tea and cards, for example. Basset was the popular game at the time, and Gwyn was a frequent — and high-stakes — gambler.

Gwyn returned to the stage again in late 1670, something Beauclerk calls an "extraordinary thing to do" for a mistress with a royal child. Her return was in Dryden's The Conquest of Granada, a two-part epic produced in December 1670 and January 1671. This may have been her last play; 1671 was almost certainly her last season. Gwyn's theatrical career spanned seven years and ended at the age of 21 (if we take 1650 to be her birth year).

In the cast list of Aphra Behn's The Rover, produced at Dorset Garden in March 1677, the part of Angelica Bianca, "a famous Curtezan" is played by a Mrs Gwin. This has sparked some confusion. The spelling of "Gwin" does not refer to Nell Gwyn, but to Anne Quin. Nell Gwyn had left the stage by this point.

In February 1671, Gwyn moved into a brick townhouse at 79 Pall Mall. The property was owned by the Crown and its current resident was instructed to transfer the lease to Gwyn. It would be her main residence for the rest of her life. Gwyn seemed unsatisfied with being a lessee only — in 1673, a letter written by Joseph Williamson stated that "Madam Gwinn complains she has no house yet." Gwyn is said to have complained that "she had always conveyed free under the Crown, and always would; and would not accept [the house] till it was conveyed free to her by an Act of Parliament". In 1676, Gwyn was granted the freehold of the property, which remained in her family until 1693; as of 1960 the property was still the only one on the south side of Pall Mall not owned by the Crown Estate.

Gwyn gave birth to her second child by the King, christened James Beauclerk, on 25 December 1671, or Christmas Day.

There are two stories about how the eldest of her two children was given the Earldom of Burford, both of which are unverifiable. The first, and most popular, is that when Charles was six years old, on the arrival of the King, Gwyn said, "Come here, you little bastard, and say hello to your father." When the King protested against her calling Charles that, she replied, "Your Majesty has given me no other name by which to call him." In response, Charles created him Earl of Burford. Another is that Gwyn grabbed young Charles and hung him out of a window of Lauderdale House in Highgate, where she briefly resided, and threatened to drop him unless he was granted a peerage. The King cried out "God save the Earl of Burford!" and subsequently officially created the peerage, saving his son's life. On 21 December 1676, a warrant was passed for "a grant to Charles Beauclerc, the King's natural son, and to the heirs male of his body, of the dignities of Baron of Heddington, co. Oxford, and Earl of Burford in the same county, with remainder to his brother, James Beauclerc, and the heirs male of his body". A few weeks later, James was given "the title of Lord Beauclerc, with the place and precedence of the eldest son of an earl".

Shortly afterwards, the King granted Gwyn and their sons a house, which was renamed Burford House, on the edge of the Home Park in Windsor. She lived there when the King was in residence at Windsor Castle. In addition to the properties mentioned above, Gwyn had a summer residence on the site of what is now 61–63 King's Cross Road, London, which enjoyed later popularity as the Bagnigge Wells Spa. According to The London Encyclopaedia, she "entertained Charles II here with little concerts and breakfasts". An inscribed stone of 1680, saved and reinserted in the front wall of the present building, shows a carved mask which is probably a reference to her stage career.

Just after the death of Henry Jermyn, 1st Earl of St Albans on 5 January 1684, King Charles granted his son Charles the title of Duke of St Albans, gave him an allowance of £1,000 a year, and also granted him the offices of Chief Ranger of Enfield Chase and Master of the Hawks in reversion; i.e., after the death of the current incumbents.

King Charles died on 6 February 1685. James II, obeying his brother's deathbed wish, "Let not poor Nelly starve", eventually paid most of Gwyn's debts and gave her an annual pension of £1,500. He also paid off the mortgage on Gwyn's Nottinghamshire lodge, which remained in the Beauclerk family until 1940. At the same time, James applied pressure on Gwyn and her son Charles to convert to Roman Catholicism, something she resisted.

== Death ==
In March 1687, Gwyn suffered a stroke that left her paralysed on one side. In May, a second stroke left her confined to the bed in her Pall Mall house; she made out her will on 9 July and a codicil on 18 October with her executors, Laurence Hyde, 1st Earl of Rochester, Thomas Herbert, 8th Earl of Pembroke, Sir Robert Sawyer and Henry Sidney each receiving £100. Gwyn died from apoplexy "almost certainly due to the acquired variety of syphilis" on 14 November 1687, at ten in the evening, less than three years after the King's death. She was 37 years old (if she was born in 1650). Her balance at Child & Co. was reported to be well over four figures, and she possessed almost 15,000 ounces of plate (solid silver). Therefore, it has been suggested that most of her wealth was in trust or not in liquid assets, which might explain why the rich woman was so poor. A letter from Wigmore to Etherege, the day after Gwyn's burial, reports that Gwyn left about £1,000,000, "a great many say more, few less". The majority of her estate went to her son. Gwyn's will also conveys her charitable side with her leaving £100 to be distributed to the poor of the parish of St Martin-in-the-Fields and Westminster and £50 to release debtors from prison every Christmas.

She was buried in the church of St Martin-in-the-Fields, London, on 17 November 1687. In compliance with one of Gwyn's final requests, Thomas Tenison, the future Archbishop of Canterbury, preached a sermon on 17 December from the text of Luke 15:7 "Just so, I tell you, there will be more joy in heaven over one sinner who repents than over ninety-nine righteous persons who need no repentance." Her will and codicil were proved on 7 December 1687.

== Legacy ==
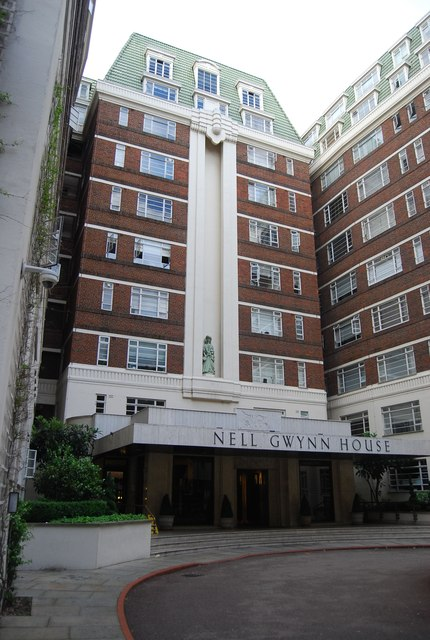
Nell Gwynn House, Chelsea

Though Gwyn was often caricatured as an empty-headed woman, John Dryden said that her greatest attribute was her native wit, and she certainly became a hostess who was able to keep the friendship of Dryden, the playwright Aphra Behn, William Ley, 4th Earl of Marlborough (a lover of hers), John Wilmot, 2nd Earl of Rochester, and the King's other mistresses. She is especially remembered for one particularly apt witticism, which was recounted in the memoirs of the Comte de Gramont, remembering the events of 1681:

Nell Gwynn was one day passing through the streets of Oxford, in her coach, when the mob mistaking her for her rival, the Duchess of Portsmouth, commenced hooting and loading her with every opprobrious epithet. Putting her head out of the coach window, "Good people", she said, smiling, "you are mistaken; I am the Protestant whore."

The Catholic whore was the Frenchwoman Louise de Kérouaille, who had been created Duchess of Portsmouth in 1673.

The author of her 1752 biography relates a conversation (more than likely fabricated) between Gwyn and Charles II in which he, feeling at a loss, said, "O, Nell! What shall I do to please the People of England? I am torn to pieces by their clamours."

"If it please your Majesty," she replied, "there is but one way left, which expedient I am afraid it will be difficult to persuade you to embrace. Dismiss your ladies, may it please your Majesty, and mind your business; the People of England will soon be pleased."

She is noted for another remark made to her coachman, who was fighting with another man who had called her a whore. She broke up the fight, saying, "I am a whore. Find something else to fight about."

In 1937, a new ten-storey block of 437 flats in Sloane Avenue, Chelsea, was given the name Nell Gwynn House, and in a high alcove above the main entrance is a statue of Gwyn, with a Cavalier King Charles Spaniel at her feet. Mostly unnoticed by passersby, this is believed to be the only statue of a royal mistress in the capital city.

In 1985 the semi-autobiographical Oranges Are Not the Only Fruit by Jeanette Winterson was published; the epigraph is ascribed to Gwyn on its frontispiece.

== Arms and lineage ==
According to Paul A. Fox, "[The coat of arms of Nell Gwyn] are clearly based on the arms attributed to Cadwgan ap Bleddyn, Prince of Powys: or, a lion rampant azure. Only one family of Gwyn or Wyn ever used these arms, and they were a little-known clan from Trelydan in Guilsfield, near Welshpool. This family were somewhat distant kinsmen of Nell's own ancestors. One of its members was Captain John Gwyn, who taught Charles II military exercises when he was Prince of Wales, and served throughout the English Civil War and afterwards in the Royal Regiment of Guards, later commanded by the King's son, the Duke of Monmouth. He can be placed in some of the same campaigns as Captain Thomas Gwyn, and the two men had probably met. John [Gwyn] has left a famous account of his exploits during the war, which include his pedigree and arms. It is likely that he would have sought out Nell and claimed kinship with her, as a means of furthering his own military career. It is hard to imagine how otherwise Nell would have come to bear the arms that she did." It is unknown if Nell's arms were officially granted by the College of Arms during the reign of Charles II, or were self-assumed.

Coat of arms of Nell Gwyn
Escutcheon Per pale Argent and Or a lion rampant Azure on a Lozenge

=== Titles ===
Nell Gwyn never received any official titles from the King while serving as his mistress. Some accounts state that Charles II planned to ennoble Gwyn by making her the "Countess of Greenwich", following the bestowing of the titles of Duchess of Cleveland, Countess of Southampton and Baroness Nonsuch upon his other mistress, Barbara Palmer, as well as the titles Earl of Castlemaine and Baron Limerick upon her husband, Roger Palmer; the title of Viscount Shannon upon Francis Boyle, husband of his first mistress, Elizabeth Killigrew; and the titles of Duchess of Portsmouth, Duchess of Aubigny, Countess of Fareham and Baroness Petersfield to yet another mistress, Louise de Kérouaille. However, Charles II died on 6 February 1685 before he could formally ennoble Gwyn.

King Charles' younger brother and successor, James II, refrained from ennobling Gwyn, likely due to doubts over Gwyn converting to Roman Catholicism, and her loyalty to the Crown. He was not far off the mark; the Duke of St Albans travelled to the Dutch Republic to support William of Orange and Mary deposing James II in the Glorious Revolution in November 1688. The Duke of St Albans would go on to become a court favorite of William and Mary, fighting on the Crown's behalf on military campaigns in Flanders.

By the time William and Mary came to power, Nell Gwyn had already died a full year prior.

In 1705, John Campbell, 2nd Duke of Argyll was created Earl of Greenwich and Baron Chatham by Queen Anne as a reward for his support for the Acts of Union 1707, and further elevated to the title Duke of Greenwich in 1719. Upon his death, his Scottish titles passed to his brother, and the English titles became extinct. The next title creation was in Peerage of Great Britain in 1767, when Lady Caroline Townshend, daughter of the 2nd Duke of Argyll, was made Baroness Greenwich, in the County of Kent, with remainder to the male issue by her second husband, Charles Townshend. As Caroline's two sons by her second husband predeceased her, the title became extinct upon her death in 1794, and reverted back to the Crown.

The second creation came in the Peerage of the United Kingdom in 1947, when Lieutenant Philip Mountbatten, on the morning of his wedding to Princess Elizabeth (later Queen Elizabeth II), was made Baron Greenwich, of Greenwich in the County of London. He was made Duke of Edinburgh and Earl of Merioneth at the same time. Prince Philip died on 9 April 2021, and the title passed to his son Charles, until it merged with the Crown when he became King Charles III on 8 September 2022.

== Issue ==
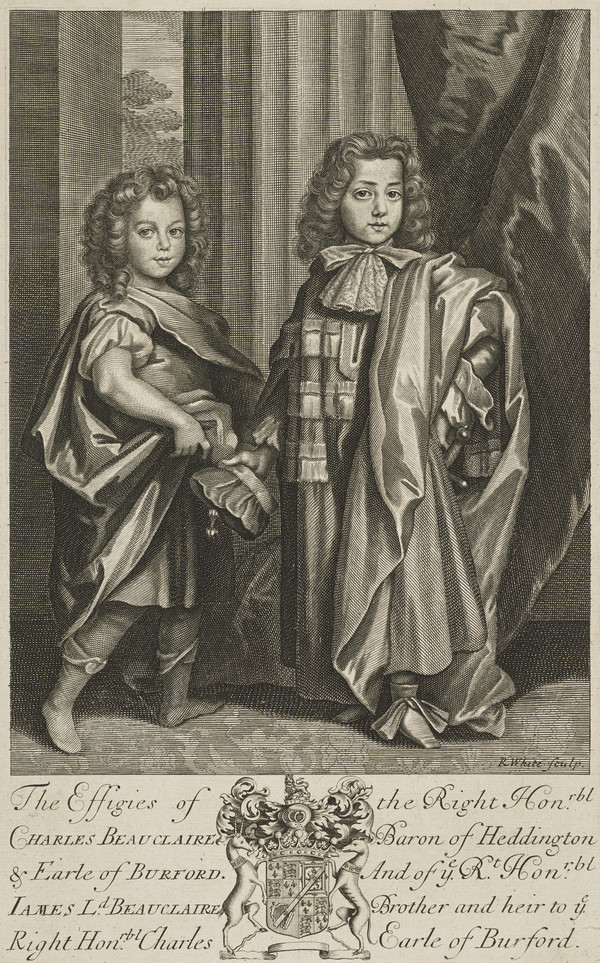
Charles and James Beauclerk, the two sons of Charles II and Nell Gwyn, in a 1679 engraving. Charles is depicted holding a coronet

By King Charles II, Nell Gwyn had two sons:

- Charles Beauclerk, 1st Duke of St Albans (8 May 1670 – 10 May 1726), created Earl of Burford and Baron Heddington, in the county of Oxfordshire, on 21 December 1676 at the age of 6, and Duke of St Albans in 1684 at the age of 14
- James Beauclerk, Lord Beauclerc (Note: According to Debrett's Peerage (c. 1769) on courtesy titles, "The son and heir apparent of a duke, marquess or earl may use one of his father's peerage titles by courtesy, providing it is of a lesser grade than that used by his father." In this particular case, the Rt. Hon. Lord James Beauclerk was to be considered as "the son and heir of his elder brother, Charles Beauclerk, Earl of Burford" by royal decree on 21 December 1676, and was thus entitled to use "Baron Heddington" as a courtesy title.) (25 December 1671 – September 1680 or 1681), designated as his brother's heir to the Earldom of Burford in 1676 at the age of 5, should his elder brother fail to produce issue

James Beauclerk was sent to school in Paris when he was 6, where he died in either September 1680 or 1681. The circumstances of the child's life in Paris and the cause of his death are both unknown, one of the few clues being that he died "of a sore leg", which Beauclerk speculates could mean anything from an accident to poison. It is also unknown if James Beauclerk's body was buried in France or Britain.

Charles Beauclerk, however, survived to adulthood. On 17 April 1694, at the age of 23, he married Lady Diana de Vere, daughter and sole heiress of Aubrey de Vere, 20th Earl of Oxford. She was a well-known beauty, who became a Lady of the Bedchamber to Caroline of Ansbach, the then-Princess of Wales. By his wife, Charles Beauclerk gave Nell Gwyn twelve grandchildren:

=== Grandchildren ===
- Charles Beauclerk, 2nd Duke of St Albans (6 April 1696 – 27 July 1751)
- Lady Diana Beauclerk (c. 1697 – ?)
- Lord William Beauclerk (22 May 1698 – 1733)
- Admiral Vere Beauclerk, 1st Baron Vere (14 July 1699 – 21 October 1781)
- Colonel Lord Henry Beauclerk (11 August 1701 – 5 January 1761)
- Lord Sidney Beauclerk (27 February 1703 – 23 November 1744)
- Lieutenant-General Lord George Beauclerk (26 December 1704 – 11 May 1768)
- Lord Seymour Beauclerk (born 24 June 1708 – c. 1709)
- Rt Revd Lord James Beauclerk (c. 1709 – 20 October 1787), became Bishop of Hereford in 1746
- Captain Lord Aubrey Beauclerk (c. 1710 – 22 March 1741), died at the Battle of Cartagena de Indias
- Lady Mary Beauclerk (c. 1712 – ?)
- Lady Anne Beauclerk (c. 1714 – ?)

Charles Beauclerk died on 10 May 1726 at the age of 56, and was buried at Westminster Abbey on 20 May, but has no monument or marker. His direct male-line descendant is Murray Beauclerk, 14th Duke of St Albans, Governor-General of the Royal Stuart Society.

== In stage works and literature ==
Gwyn has appeared as the principal, or a leading character, in numerous stage works and novels, including:

- 1799, The Peckham Frolic : or Nell Gwyn, a comedy in three acts by Edward Jerningham
- 1882, A Royal Amour, a novel by Richard Davey
- 1884, Nell Gwynne, an operetta by Robert Planquette and Henry Brougham Farnie
- 1900, Sweet Nell of Old Drury, a play by Paul Kester
- 1900, Mistress Nell, a swashbuckling melodrama by George Hazelton
- 1900, English Nell, a play by Edward Rose, later retitled Nell Gwynne, adapted from Anthony Hope's book, Simon Dale; composer Edward German wrote incidental music for the play which is still performed on occasion
- 1900, Nell Gwyn – Comedian, a novel by Frank Frankfort Moore
- 1924, Our Nell, a musical by Harold Fraser-Simson and Ivor Novello; a rewrite of 1919's Our Peg, replacing Peg Woffington with Nell Gwyn (the 1922 Broadway musical by George Gershwin, also called Our Nell, was not based on the Nell Gwyn story)
- 1926, Mistress Nell Gwynne, a novel by Marjorie Bowen
- 1928, Orlando: A Biography, a novel by Virginia Woolf, which references "that amorous lady" Nell Gwyn
- 1939, a character in George Bernard Shaw's play In Good King Charles's Golden Days
- 1944, a character in Kathleen Winsor's novel Forever Amber
- 1975, Here Lies Our Sovereign Lord, the third part of Jean Plaidy's historical trilogy, The Loves of Charles II
- 1986, "Nell Gwyn and her oranges" are referred to in "Move Over Busker", a song from Paul McCartney's Press to Play album
- 1993, a prominent character in Playhouse Creatures, a play by April De Angelis
- 2006, The Remarkable Life and Times of Eliza Rose, a children's historical novel by Mary Hooper where Gwyn is a central character
- 2007, The Perfect Royal Mistress, a novel by Diane Haeger
- 2008, The King's Favorite, a novel by Susan Holloway Scott
- 2009, Or, a play by Liz Duffy Adams where Gwynne is a central character
- 2011, The Darling Strumpet, a debut novel by Gillian Bagwell
- 2011, Exit the Actress, a novel by Priya Parmar interwoven with authentic contemporary documents in order to portray the political and social tumult of the time
- 2015, Nell Gwynne: A Dramatick Essaye on Acting and Prostitution, a play by Bella Merlin
- 2015–2017, Nell Gwynn, a play by Jessica Swale
- 2019, Pretty, Witty Nell, a one-woman play by Rogue Shakespeare
- 2026, Nell! the Musical, a new musical with music and lyrics by Dominic Sandford, arrangements by Laurie Esse, and book by Dominic Sandford, Bob Price, Julie Billing and Laurie Sandford, based on an original work by Susanne Skinner, premiered in Charlton Mackrell, Somerset, in June 2026 after 17 years in development.

== In film and television ==
- In the 1911 film Sweet Nell of Old Drury (based on the play of the same name described above), portrayed by Nellie Stewart
- In the 1915 film Mistress Nell (based on Hazelton's play of 1900), portrayed by Mary Pickford
- In the 1922 film The Glorious Adventure, portrayed by Lois Sturt
- In the 1926 film Nell Gwyn, portrayed by Dorothy Gish
- In the 1934 film Love, Life and Laughter, portrayed by Gracie Fields
- In the 1934 film Nell Gwyn, portrayed by Anna Neagle
- In the 1941 film Hudson's Bay, portrayed by Virginia Field
- In the 1949 film Cardboard Cavalier, portrayed by Margaret Lockwood
- In the 1958 mini-series, The Diary of Samuel Pepys, portrayed by Sheila Brennan
- In the 1969 mini-series The First Churchills, portrayed by Andrea Lawrence
- In the 1995 film England, My England, portrayed by Lucy Speed
- In the 2003 mini-series Charles II: The Power and The Passion, portrayed by Emma Pierson
- In the 2004 film Stage Beauty, portrayed by Zoë Tapper

== See also ==
- English and British royal mistresses
