= Jane Beauclerk, Duchess of St Albans =

Her Grace The Duchess of St Albans
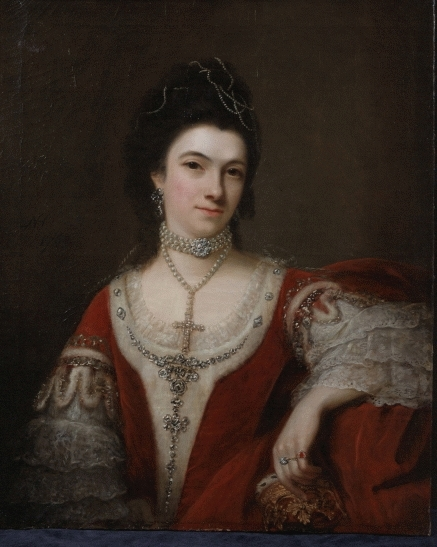
- Jane Roberts, Duchess of St Albans (in 1768), by Nathaniel Hone the Elder

Personal details
- Born: Jane Roberts; 1731
- Died: 16 December 1778 (aged 46–47)
- Spouse: George Beauclerk, 3rd Duke of St Albans (m. 1752)
- Parents: Sir Walter Roberts, 6th Baronet of Glassenbury (father); Elizabeth Slaughter (mother)

Jane Beauclerk, Duchess of St Albans (nee Roberts; c. 1731 – 16 December 1778), formerly Jane Roberts, was the wife of George Beauclerk, 3rd Duke of St Albans.

Jane and her sister Elizabeth (who died young) were the daughters of Sir Walter Roberts, 6th Baronet of Glassenbury (1691–1745), and his wife, the former Elizabeth Slaughter, who herself was the only daughter and heiress of William Slaughter (or Slatter), of Rochester, Kent. Following the deaths of her parents, her guardians were Lord Romney and Sir Philip Boteler.

Jane, whose inheritance was valued at £125,000, married the Duke on 23 December 1752 at St George's, Hanover Square, London. Through this marriage he also acquired her parents' house at Glassenbury, Tunbridge Wells. Having paid off his debts with her dowry, he treated her badly, and the couple separated after two years of marriage.

The duke went to live in France, where he kept mistresses and was for a time in debtors' prison. In 1760 the couple were briefly reconciled in Brussels, but they soon separated again, and the duchess returned to her family home at Glassenbury.

The Duchess died on 16 December 1778, in her forties and childless. The Duke, who outlived his wife, had a number of illegitimate children. The Roberts baronetcy having become extinct on the death of Sir Walter, the dukedom passed to a distant cousin on the Duke's death.
