= George Beauclerk, 4th Duke of St Albans =

British Duke (1758–1787(

- Duke of St Albans
- Tenure: 1786–1787
- Predecessor: George Beauclerk, 3rd Duke of St Albans
- Successor: Aubrey Beauclerk, 5th Duke of St Albans
- Born: 5 December 1758
- Died: 10 February 1787 (aged 28)
- Father: Lt.-Col. Charles Beauclerk

George Beauclerk, 4th Duke of St Albans (5 December 1758 – 10 February 1787) was the son of Lt.-Col. Charles Beauclerk and a great-grandson of Charles Beauclerk, 1st Duke of St Albans an illegitimate son of Charles II of England and his mistress Nell Gwyn.

He died in 1787, aged 28 in London, unmarried and childless, and his titles passed to his cousin, Aubrey Beauclerk. He was buried at St James's Church, Piccadilly, on 23 February 1787.

Peerage of England
Preceded by George Beauclerk	Duke of St Albans; 1786–1787	Succeeded by Aubrey Beauclerk
