= John Legh (18th century MP) =

18th century English politician

John Legh (1668–1739), of Adlington, Cheshire, was an English Member of Parliament for Bodmin in Cornwall in 1715–1722.
