= Charles Beauclerk, 2nd Duke of St Albans =

British Politician and Aristocrat 1696-1751

His Grace The Duke of St Albans KG KB
- Arms of Charles Beauclerk, 2nd Duke of St Albans: Arms of 1st Duke of St Albans (royal arms of King Charles II debruised by a baton sinister gules charged with three roses argent (Lennox)) quartering de Vere

Member of the Great Britain Parliament for Bodmin
- In office 1718–1722 Serving with John Legh (1715–1722)
- Preceded by: Francis Robartes; John Legh
- Succeeded by: Isaac le Heup; Richard West

Member of the Great Britain Parliament for Windsor
- In office 1722–1726 Serving with The Earl of Inchiquin (1722–1727)
- Preceded by: Sir Henry Ashurst; Samuel Travers
- Succeeded by: The Earl of Inchiquin; Lord Vere Beauclerk

Personal details
- Born: 6 April 1696
- Died: 27 July 1751 (aged 55) London, England
- Resting place: Westminster Abbey
- Spouse: Lucy Werden (m. 1722)
- Children: George Beauclerk, 3rd Duke of St Albans; Lady Diana Barrington; Diane Beauclerk-Lennox; Suzanne Beauclerk
- Parents: Charles Beauclerk, 1st Duke of St Albans (father); Lady Diana de Vere (mother)

Charles Beauclerk, 2nd Duke of St Albans, KG KB (6 April 1696 – 27 July 1751) was a British Whig politician who sat in the House of Commons from 1718 until 1726 when he succeeded to a peerage as Duke of St Albans. He was an illegitimate grandson of King Charles II.

== Origins ==
He was the son and heir of Charles Beauclerk, 1st Duke of St Albans by his wife Diana de Vere, daughter and sole heiress of Aubrey de Vere, 20th Earl of Oxford. His paternal grandparents were King Charles II of England and his mistress Nell Gwynne. He was styled Earl of Burford until 1726.

== Career ==
He was educated at Eton College from 1706 to 1707 and matriculated at New College, Oxford on 24 April 1714. From 1716 to 1717 he undertook a Grand Tour in Italy.

He was elected as a Member of Parliament for Bodmin, Cornwall, at a by-election on 26 February 1718. At the 1722 general election he was returned as an MP for Windsor. He sat until 1726 when on the death of his father he succeeded to the peerage and vacated his seat in the House of Commons. He was appointed Master of the Hawks in 1726 which office he held until his death. He was Lord Lieutenant of Berkshire from 1727 to his death. In 1730 he was appointed Constable and Governor of Windsor Castle and Warden of Windsor Forest. He was appointed Lord of the Bedchamber in 1738 and held the position until his death. He was High Steward of Windsor.

== Marriage and children ==
On 13 December 1722 he married Lucy Werden the eldest daughter and co-heiress of Sir John Werden, 2nd Baronet, with whom he had two children:

- George Beauclerk, 3rd Duke of St Albans (1730–1786); son and heir
- Lady Diana Beauclerk (c. 1746–1766); married the Rev. and Hon. Shute Barrington, a son of John Shute Barrington, 1st Viscount Barrington.

== Death and burial ==
Beauclerk died in 1751, aged 55 in London, and was interred in Westminster Abbey.

Parliament of Great Britain
Preceded by Francis Robartes; John Legh	Member of Parliament for Bodmin; 1718–1722; With: John Legh 1715–1722	Succeeded by Isaac le Heup; Richard West
Preceded by Sir Henry Ashurst; Samuel Travers	Member of Parliament for Windsor; 1722–1726; With: The Earl of Inchiquin 1722–1727	Succeeded by The Earl of Inchiquin; Lord Vere Beauclerk
Political offices
Preceded by New office	Master of the Horse to Queen Caroline; 1727	Succeeded by The Earl of Pomfret
Honorary titles
Preceded by The Duke of St Albans	Lord Lieutenant of Berkshire; 1727–1751	Succeeded by The Duke of St Albans
Preceded by The Earl of Carlisle	Constable and Governor of Windsor Castle; 1730–1751	Succeeded by The Earl of Cardigan
Peerage of England
Preceded by Charles Beauclerk	Duke of St Albans; 1726–1751	Succeeded by George Beauclerk
