= Vere Beauclerk, 1st Baron Vere =

British peer and politician

Admiral The Right Honourable The Lord Vere
- Born: 14 July 1699
- Died: 21 October 1781 (aged 82); St James's Square, London
- Burial place: St James's Palace, London
- Spouse: Mary Chambers
- Children: 6, including Aubrey
- Military career
- Allegiance: Kingdom of Great Britain
- Branch: Royal Navy
- Service years: 1713–1750
- Rank: Admiral
- Commands: HMS Lyme; HMS Kinsale; HMS Oxford; HMS Hampton Court

Admiral Vere Beauclerk, 1st Baron Vere (14 July 1699 – 21 October 1781), known as Lord Vere Beauclerk until 1750, was a Royal Navy officer, British peer and politician who sat in the House of Commons for 24 years from 1726 to 1750. After serving various ships in the Mediterranean and then commanding the third-rate HMS Hampton Court, he joined the Board of Admiralty, ultimately serving as Senior Naval Lord.

== Naval career ==
Born the son of the 1st Duke of St Albans and his wife Diana Beauclerk, Duchess of St Albans, he was an illegitimate grandson of King Charles II.

Beauclerk joined the Royal Navy in 1713. Promoted to post-captain on 30 May 1721, he served in various ships in the Mediterranean before being given command of the sixth-rate HMS Lyme in 1727, the fifth-rate HMS Kinsale in 1729 and the fourth-rate HMS Oxford in 1731. He went to command the third-rate HMS Hampton Court in December 1731.

Beauclerk joined the Board of Admiralty under the Whig government in March 1738 but had to step down when the Government fell in March 1742. He returned to the Board again when the Broad Bottom ministry came to power in December 1744 and was promoted to rear admiral on 23 April 1745. He was advanced to Senior Naval Lord on the Board in February 1746 and promoted to vice admiral on 14 July 1746 and to full admiral on 12 May 1748 before retiring in November 1749.

Beauclerk was elected one of the first Vice Presidents of London's charitable Foundling Hospital for abandoned children, an unpaid position. He served in that capacity from the institution's first year of 1739 until 1756, but then again from 1758 until 1767. From 1726 to 1741 Beauclerk was Member of Parliament (MP) for Windsor and for Plymouth (succeeding his brother Henry) from 1741 to 1750. On his retirement from politics in 1750, he was created Baron Vere, of Hanworth in the County of Middlesex. he was also Lord Lieutenant of Berkshire from 1761 to 1771. It is said that he died at his home, 16 St James's Square in London, on 21 October 1781, although this date would appear at odds with the burial register of St James's Church, Piccadilly, which has him being buried on 6 October 1781.

== Family ==
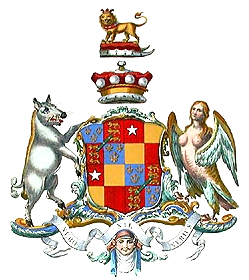
Arms of Admiral Lord Vere

On 13 April 1736, in London, he married Mary Chambers (c. 1714-21 January 1783), a maternal granddaughter of the 2nd Earl of Berkeley. They later had six children (four of whom died young):

- Vere Beauclerk (12 January 1737 – 26 December 1739)
- Chamber Beauclerk (22 February 1738 – 16 July 1747)
- Sackville Beauclerk (12 April 1739 – 25 April 1739)
- Aubrey Beauclerk, 5th Duke of St Albans (3 June 1740 – 9 February 1802)
- Elizabeth Beauclerk (7 July 1741 – April 1746); buried on 26 April 1746.
- The Hon. Mary Beauclerk (4 December 1743 – 13 January 1812); who married Lord Charles Spencer, son of the 3rd Duke of Marlborough.

== Sources ==
- Nichols, R.H.; Wray, F. A. (1935). The History of the Foundling Hospital. London: Oxford University Press.
- Rodger, N.A.M. (1979). The Admiralty. Offices of State. Lavenham: T. Dalton Ltd. ISBN 0900963948.

Parliament of Great Britain
Preceded by Earl of Burford; The Earl of Inchiquin	Member of Parliament for Windsor; 1726–1741; With: The Earl of Inchiquin 1726–1727; Viscount Malpas 1727–1733; Lord Sidney Beauclerk 1733–1741	Succeeded by Lord Sidney Beauclerk; Henry Fox
Preceded by Arthur Stert; Lord Henry Beauclerk	Member of Parliament for Plymouth; 1741–1750; With: Arthur Stert	Succeeded by Arthur Stert; Charles Saunders
Military offices
Preceded by Lord Archibald Hamilton	Senior Naval Lord; 1746–1749	Succeeded by Lord Anson
Political offices
Preceded by The Duke of St Albans	Lord Lieutenant of Berkshire; 1761–1771	Succeeded by The Duke of St Albans
Peerage of Great Britain
New title	Baron Vere; 1750–1781	Succeeded by Aubrey Beauclerk
