= Lord Sidney Beauclerk =

British politician (1703–1744)

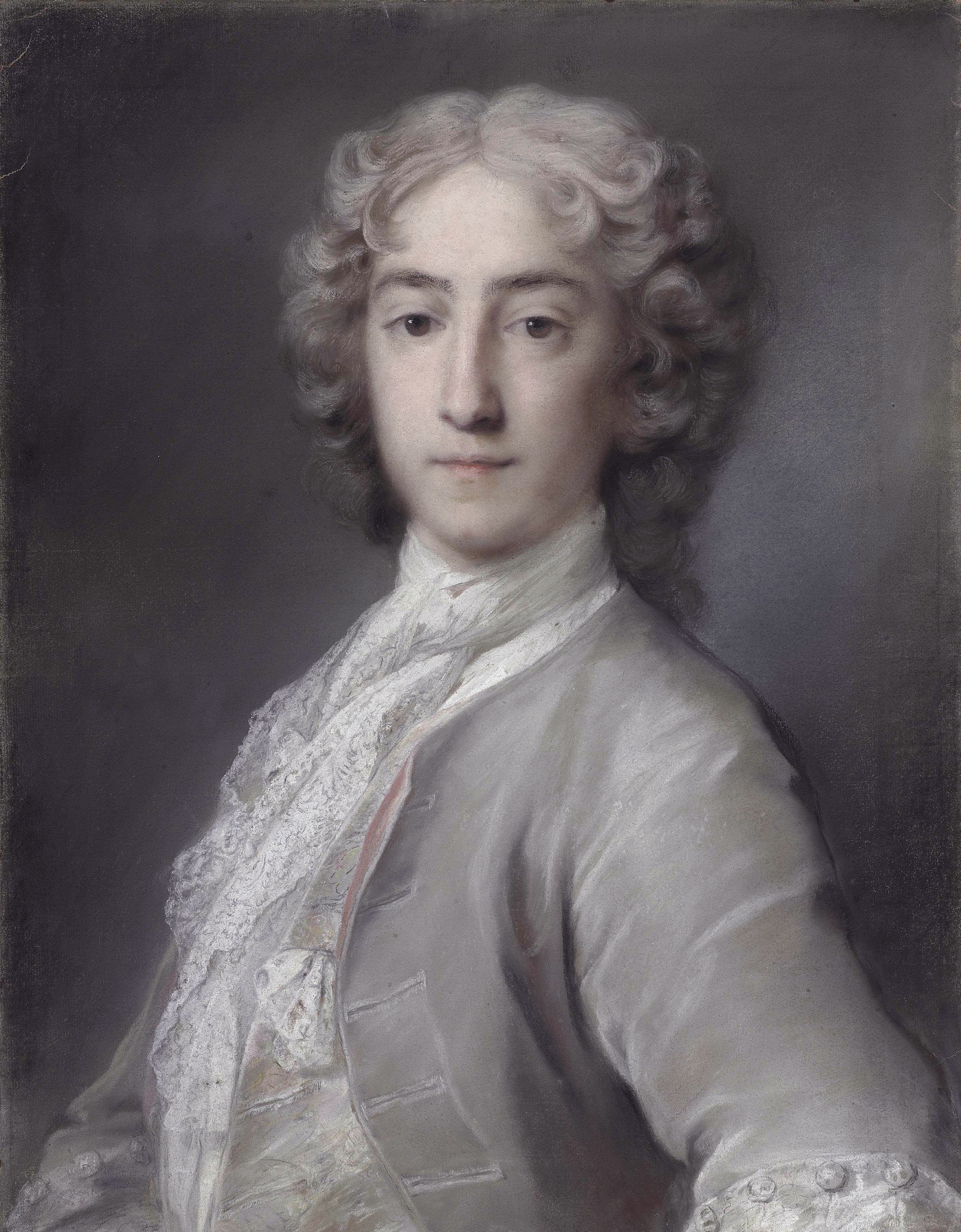
Lord Sidney Beauclerk (1703–44) (Rosalba Carriera, c.1723)

Beauclerk arms

Lord Sidney Beauclerk PC (27 February 1703 – 23 November 1744) was a British politician who sat in the House of Commons from 1733 to 1744. He acquired a reputation as a fortune hunter.

== Early life ==
Beauclerk was the fifth son of the 1st Duke of St Albans and his wife Lady Diana de Vere, daughter and heiress of Aubrey de Vere, 20th and last Earl of Oxford. He was a grandson of King Charles II and Nell Gwyn. In 1718 he was at Eton College. He matriculated at Trinity College, Oxford in 1721 and was awarded MA in 1727 and DCL in 1733. He sought fortunes by paying court to elderly ladies and he was described in 1727 as 'Nell Gwyn in person, with the sex altered'. On 9 December 1736, he married Mary Norris, daughter and heiress of Thomas Norris, MP of Speke, Lancashire. His fortune-hunting eventually brought dividend in 1737 when he was bequeathed the Windsor estates of Richard Topham located in and around Old Windsor.

== Career ==
Beauclerk stood unsuccessfully for Parliament in a contest at Marlow at a by-election in 1732 on the interest of Edmund Waller. He was returned as Member of Parliament for Windsor at a by-election on 16 May 1733, joining his brother Lord Vere Beauclerk. He was returned unopposed at the 1734 British general election. In March 1739, he presented to Parliament the Georgia Society's petition for a grant, and he was elected at his own request to the common council of the Society. He was active until 1740, when his attendance fell off. He was sworn of the Privy Council in 1740, and was appointed Vice-Chamberlain of the Household later that year, being returned again at the consequential by-election. He was returned again at Windsor at the 1741 British general election, but lost his place at Court on the fall of Walpole in 1742.

== Death and legacy ==
Beauclerk died on 23 November 1744, leaving an only son, Topham Beauclerk who was a friend of Samuel Johnson. He married Diana, Viscountess Bolingbroke and St John (née Spencer) and lived at Speke Hall. They have many surviving descendants among whom are the present Marquises de Valero de Urría.

Political offices
| Preceded by The Lord Hervey | Vice-Chamberlain of the Household; 1740–1742 | Succeeded by The Rt Hon. William Finch |
Parliament of Great Britain
| Preceded by Viscount Malpas and Lord Vere Beauclerk | Member for Windsor; 1733–1744; With: Lord Vere Beauclerk 1726–41, Henry Fox 1741–44 | Succeeded by Lord George Beauclerk and Henry Fox |
