= Lord George Beauclerk =

British Army officer

Lieutenant-General Lord George Beauclerk (26 December 1704 – 11 May 1768) was a British Army officer, the sixth son of Charles Beauclerk, 1st Duke of St Albans by his wife Diana, daughter of Aubrey de Vere, 20th Earl of Oxford.

== Military career ==
Beauclerk served in the 1st Regiment of Foot Guards, and was promoted to captain and lieutenant-colonel in September 1736. In 1745 he was nominated aide-de-camp to King George II with the rank of colonel, and in 1747 he obtained the colonelcy of the 8th Regiment of Marines (afterwards disbanded), from which he was removed on 15 March 1748 to the 19th Regiment of Foot. In 1753 he was appointed Governor of Landguard Fort, holding the post until his death. He was promoted to the rank of major-general in 1755, to that of lieutenant-general in 1758 and performed the duties of Commander-in-Chief in Scotland from 1756 to 1767.

== Political career ==
He was Member of Parliament for New Windsor from 1744 to 1754. He was elected again for New Windsor in the 1768 election but died the day after Parliament met.

== Family ==
Beauclerk married Margaret Bainbridge, daughter of Thomas Bainbridge of Slaley, Northumberland.

Parliament of Great Britain
Preceded by Lord Sidney Beauclerk; Henry Fox	Member for Windsor; 1744–1754; With: Henry Fox	Succeeded by Henry Fox; John Fitzwilliam
Preceded by John Fitzwilliam; Augustus Keppel, 1st Viscount Keppel	Member for Windsor; Mar-May 1768; With: Augustus Keppel, 1st Viscount Keppel	Succeeded by Augustus Keppel, 1st Viscount Keppel; Richard Tonson
Military offices
Preceded by Charles Howard	Colonel of the 19th (The 1st Yorkshire North Riding) Regiment of Foot; 1748–1768	Succeeded by David Graeme
