= Charles Beauclerk, 1st Duke of St Albans =

Illegitimate son of Charles II of England (1670–1726)

His Grace The Duke of St Albans
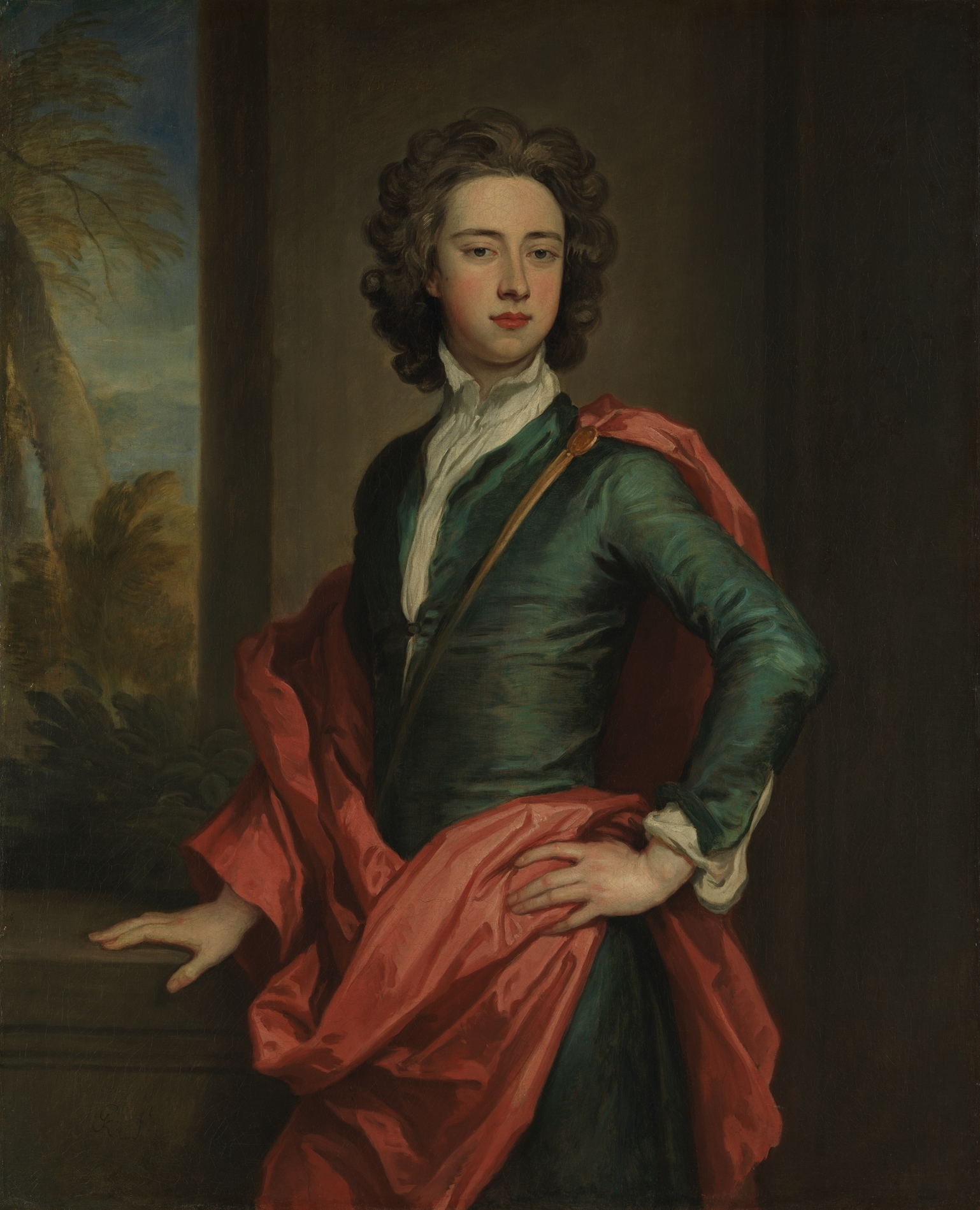
- Charles Beauclerk circa 1690, on display at the Metropolitan Museum of Art.
- Born: 8 May 1670
- Died: 10 May 1726 (aged 56); Bath, England
- Buried: Westminster Abbey
- Noble family: Beauclerk
- Spouse: Lady Diana de Vere (m. 1694)
- Issue: Charles Beauclerk, 2nd Duke of St Albans; Lady Diana Beauclerk; Lord William Beauclerk; Vere Beauclerk, 1st Baron Vere; Lord Henry Beauclerk; Lord Sidney Beauclerk; Lord George Beauclerk; Lord Seymour Beauclerk; Lord James Beauclerk; Lord Aubrey Beauclerk; Lady Mary Beauclerk; Lady Anne Beauclerk
- Father: Charles II of England
- Mother: Nell Gwyn

Charles Beauclerk, 1st Duke of St. Albans, KG (8 May 1670 – 10 May 1726) was an illegitimate son of King Charles II of England by his mistress Nell Gwyn.

== Biography ==
His surname, Beauclerk (Anglo-Norman for "fine scholar"), had been an epithet of King Henry I. On 21 December 1676, a warrant was passed for "a grant to Charles Beauclerc, the King's natural son, and to the heirs male of his body, of the dignities of Baron of Heddington, co. Oxford, and Earl of Burford in the same county, with remainder to his brother, James Beauclerc, and the heirs male of his body." A few weeks later, James was given "the title of Lord Beauclerc, with the place and precedence of the eldest son of an earl." Just after the death of Henry Jermyn, 1st Earl of St Albans, at the turn of the year, on 5 January 1684, King Charles granted his son Charles, Earl of Burford, the title of Duke of St Albans, gave him an allowance of £1,000 a year, and granted him the offices of Chief Ranger of Enfield Chace and Master of the Hawks in reversion (i. e. after the death of the current incumbents). He became colonel in the 8th regiment of horse in 1687, and served with the emperor Leopold I, being present at the siege of Belgrade in 1688.

When his mother died (14 November 1687), Beauclerk received a large estate, including Burford House, near Windsor Castle. After the Battle of Landen in 1693, William III made Beauclerk captain of the gentlemen pensioners, and four years later gentleman of the bedchamber. His father had given him the reversion of the office of Hereditary Master Falconer and that of Hereditary Registrar of the Court of Chancery, which fell vacant in 1698. His Whig sentiments prevented his advancement under Queen Anne, but he was restored to favour at the accession of King George I. In 1718, George made him a Knight of the Garter.

Beauclerk died at Bath two days after his 56th birthday and is buried in Westminster Abbey. He was succeeded by his eldest son.

== Marriage and issue ==
On 17 April 1694 he married Lady Diana de Vere, daughter and sole heiress (as her sisters died unmarried) of Aubrey de Vere, 20th Earl of Oxford. She was a well-known beauty, who became lady of the bedchamber to Caroline of Ansbach, Princess of Wales. By his wife he had twelve children:

- Charles Beauclerk, 2nd Duke of St Albans (6 April 1696 – 27 July 1751), eldest son and heir;
- Diana Beauclerk (born c. 1697 – 1743)
- William Beauclerk (22 May 1698 – 23 February 1733 N.S.)
- Vere Beauclerk, 1st Baron Vere (14 July 1699 – 21 October 1781)
- Henry Beauclerk (11 August 1701 – 5 January 1761)
- Sidney Beauclerk (27 February 1703 – 23 November 1744)
- George Beauclerk (26 December 1704 – 11 May 1768)
- Seymour Beauclerk (born 24 June 1708 – c. 1709)
- James Beauclerk (c. 1709 – 20 October 1787); was Bishop of Hereford (1746–1787)
- Aubrey Beauclerk (c. 1710 – 22 March 1741), became a captain in the Royal Navy, and died at the Battle of Cartagena de Indias.
- Mary Beauclerk (born c. 1712)
- Anne Beauclerk (born c. 1714)

== Earl of Burford ==
Several legends describe how Beauclerk became Earl of Burford. The first is that on arrival of the King, his mother said, "Come here, you little bastard, and greet your father." When the king rebuked her for calling him that, she replied, "Your Majesty has given me no other name to call him by." In response, Charles created him Earl of Burford.

Another legend is that Beauclerk's mother held him out of a window (or above a river) and threatened to drop him unless he was given a peerage. Charles supposedly cried out "God save the Earl of Burford!" and subsequently created that peerage.

== Arms ==
Coat of arms of Charles Beauclerk, 1st Duke of St Albans
Coronet A Coronet of a Duke Crest On a Chapeau Gules turned up Ermine a Lion statant guardant Or, crowned with a ducal coronet per pale Argent and of the first and gorged with a Collar, of the last thereon three Roses, also Argent, barbed and seeded proper. Escutcheon The royal arms of King Charles II of England (Quarterly, I and IV Quarterly, I and IV Azure, three fleur de lys Or, II and III Gules, three lions passant guardant in pale Or langued and armed Azure. II Or a lion rampant Gules armed and langued Azure within a double tressure flory-counter-flory Gules. III Azure a harp Or stringed Argent) debruised (or differenced?) by a baton sinister Gules charged with three roses Argent, seeded Or and barbed Vert, overall an inescutcheon of pretence of De Vere (Quarterly gules and or, in the first quarter a mullet argent). Supporters Dexter: An Antelope Argent armed and unguled Or, gorged with a Collar as in the crest. Sinister: A Greyhound Argent, gorged with a Collar as in the crest. Motto Auspicium Melioris Aevi (Latin: "A pledge of better times")

Court offices
Preceded by Sir Allen Apsley	Master of the Hawks; 1675–1702	Office abolished
Honorary titles
Preceded by The Lord Lovelace	Captain of the Gentlemen Pensioners; 1693–1712	Succeeded by The Duke of Beaufort
Preceded by The Duke of Beaufort	Captain of the Gentlemen Pensioners; 1714–1726	Succeeded by Marquess of Hartington
Preceded by The Duke of Northumberland	Lord Lieutenant of Berkshire; 1716–1726	Succeeded by The Duke of St Albans
Peerage of England
New creation	Duke of St Albans; 1684–1726	Succeeded by Charles Beauclerk
New creation	Earl of Burford; 1676–1726	Succeeded by Charles Beauclerk
