= Drummond =

Drummond may refer to:

== Places ==
=== Antarctica ===
- Drummond Peak, King Edward VII Land
- Drummond Glacier, Graham Land

=== Canada ===
- Drummond (federal electoral district), a Quebec federal riding
- Drummond (provincial electoral district), Quebec
- Drummond Regional County Municipality, Quebec
- Drummond Parish, New Brunswick
  - Drummond, New Brunswick, a village therein
- Drummond/North Elmsley, Ontario, formed from the merger of Drummond Township and North Elmsley Township
- Drummond, a community in the township of Otonabee–South Monaghan, Ontario

=== Northern Ireland ===
- Drummond Cricket Club Ground
- Drummond railway station

=== United States ===
- Drummond, Idaho, a city
- Drummond, Maryland, a village and special taxing district
- Drummond Township, Michigan
  - Drummond, Michigan, an unincorporated community
- Drummond, Montana, a town
- Drummond, Oklahoma, a town
- Drummond, Wisconsin, a town
  - Drummond (CDP), Wisconsin, an unincorporated census-designated place within the town
- Drummond Town, Virginia, the former name for Accomac, Virginia
- Lake Drummond, Virginia

=== Other ===
- Drummond, Victoria, a locality in Australia
- Drummond Nature Reserve, west of Bolgart, Western Australia
- Drummond, New Zealand, a town
- Drummond, KwaZulu-Natal, South Africa, a town
- 4693 Drummond, an asteroid (see List of minor planets: 4001–5000)
- Drummond Street (disambiguation)

== Buildings ==
- Drummond Castle, Perthshire, Scotland
- Drummond Methodist Church, Ottawa, Canada
- Drummond Business Block, Eau Claire, Wisconsin, on the National Register of Historic Places

== People ==
- Clan Drummond
- Drummond (given name)
- Drummond (surname)

== Military and coast guard ==
- Drummond-class corvette, a class of three corvettes of the Argentine Navy built in France
- ARA Drummond, two ships of the Argentine Navy named Drummond
- USCGC Drummond (WPB-1323), a former United States Coast Guard patrol boat
- Fort Drummond (Queenston Heights), Queenston Heights, Ontario, Canada, a fort of the War of 1812
- Fort Drummond (Drummond Island, Michigan), a fort on Drummond Island, Michigan of the War of 1812
- Drummond Battery, protecting Port Kembla, New South Wales, Australia during World War II

== Other uses ==
- Drummond, an Australia studio-only soft rock group, which became Mississippi in 1972.
- Drummond Company, a coal mining company with operations in Alabama and Colombia
- Drummond Tobacco Company, tobacco company in St. Louis, Missouri from 1873 to 1898.
- Lord Drummond (disambiguation), various titles of Scotland and Great Britain, and a fictional character
- Drummond baronets, two extinct titles in the Baronetage of the United Kingdom
- a 6-row malting barley variety

== See also ==
- Drummonds (disambiguation)
- McKean Island, Phoenix Islands, Republic of Kiribati, first called Drummond's Island
- Tabiteuea, an atoll in the Gilbert Islands, Kiribati, formerly known as Drummond's Island
