= Thomas Drummond, Lord Drummond =

The Honourable Lord Drummond

President of the Saint Andrew's Society of the State of New York
- In office 1773–1774
- Preceded by: William McAdam
- Succeeded by: David Johnston

Personal details
- Born: Thomas Lundin; 21 July 1742 Largs, Scotland
- Died: November 1780 (aged 38) Lisbon, Kingdom of Portugal
- Relations: James Drummond, 1st Baron Perth (brother); Thomas Bruce, 7th Earl of Kincardine (grandfather)
- Parent(s): James Lundin; Lady Rachel Bruce

Thomas Drummond, Lord Drummond (21 July 1742 – November 1780) was a Scottish landowner and diplomat who served as the president of the Saint Andrew's Society of the State of New York.

== Early life ==
Drummond was born on 21 July 1742 at Largs in Scotland as Thomas Lundin. He was the second of three sons born to James Lundin and the former Lady Rachel Bruce, a daughter of Thomas Bruce, 7th Earl of Kincardine. His elder sister, Veronica Drummond, married Duncan Campbell of Kames, and his younger brother, was James Drummond, 1st Baron Perth.

The Lundins descended from Thomas de Lundin, a natural son of King William the Lion. Thomas' paternal grandparents were Robert Lundin and Anne Inglis (a daughter of Sir James Inglis of Cramond). His grandfather Robert was a younger son of John Drummond, 1st Earl of Melfort (younger son of the 3rd Earl of Perth) by his first wife, Sophia Maitland. Sophia, his great-grandmother, had inherited Lundin from her brother John Lundin of Lundin, both children of Margaret (née Lundin) Maitland and Robert Maitland (a younger son of John Maitland, 1st Earl of Lauderdale). Sophia's mother Margaret had inherited the Lundin estates upon the death of her father, John Lundin of Lundin, in 1684.

=== Claim to the Earldom of Perth ===
On 6 February 1760, following the death of Edward Drummond, sixth Jacobite-jurisdiction Duke of Perth, Thomas' father became heir to the Earldom of Perth, which had been forfeit since 1716 owing to the attainder of James Drummond, 2nd Duke of Perth (The first Earl of Melfort was the younger son of James Drummond, 3rd Earl of Perth). His father, therefore, assumed the surname of Drummond and styled himself 10th Earl of Perth, after which Thomas became known as Lord Drummond, and in 1776, following the death of Jean Drummond, Duchess of Perth in 1773, his father took up residence at the Drummond estate of Stobhall in Perthshire.

== Career ==
In 1768, Lord Drummond first came to America from Scotland to defend his family's rights to lands in the Province of New Jersey, namely those of the Earl of Melfort in Perth Amboy. Due to his many influential friends on both sides of the Atlantic, he took on the role of intermediary between the colonies and England during the American Revolution.

In late December 1775, Lord Drummond arrived in Philadelphia with his plan for reconciliation. During the first two weeks of January, he discussed his plan with sympathetic members of the Continental Congress, which included Thomas Lynch. His plan was based on conversations in England, between December 1774 and September 1775, with Lord North, the prime minister of Great Britain, and Lord Dartmouth, the Secretary of State for the Colonies and First Lord of Trade, and American moderates in New York during the fall of 1774.

While Drummond did not claim the British government had officially authorized his plan, he implied to members of Congress that Lord North knew of, and approved, his plan. By January 1776, Congressman Lynch was poised to propose formal negotiations in line with Drummond's suggestions, but news of the American defeat at the Battle of Quebec weakened the American negotiating position and led to increased hostilities toward the British. In early February 1776, Drummond and Lynch met in New York in an attempt to revive the stalled peace negotiations, however, General George Washington's refused to cooperate, which led to the failure of Drummond's peace mission by early March.

After the failure of the peace plan, Drummond served as an adviser to Gen. William Howe, the Commander-in-Chief, North America for the British Army, before his return to England in November 1778.

== Personal life ==
Lord Drummond died, unmarried, in November 1780 in Lisbon, Kingdom of Portugal, where he had gone for his health. His father died eight months later on 18 July 1781, and his younger brother James succeeded to his father's claim to the Earldom of Perth, but did not use the title. His brother was later created a Peer of Great Britain as Lord Perth, Baron Drummond of Stobhall in the County of Perth.
