= James Drummond, 1st Baron Perth =

British peer (1744–1800)

The Right Honourable The Lord Perth
- Born: James Lundin; 14 February 1744; Lundin, Fife, Scotland
- Died: 2 July 1800 (aged 56); Innerpeffray, Perth and Kinross, Scotland
- Spouse: Clementina Elphinstone (m. 1785)
- Children: 3
- Parent(s): James Lundin; Lady Rachel Bruce
- Relatives: Thomas Drummond (brother); Thomas Bruce, 7th Earl of Kincardine (grandfather)

James Drummond, 1st Baron Perth (12 February 1744 – 2 July 1800), was a Scottish soldier, landowner and peer.

== Early life ==
Drummond was born on 12 February 1744 at Lundin, Fife, as James Lundin. He was the son of James Lundin and the former Lady Rachel Bruce, a daughter of Thomas Bruce, 7th Earl of Kincardine. His elder sister, Veronica Drummond, married Duncan Campbell of Kames, and his elder brother was Thomas Drummond, Lord Drummond.

The Lundins descended from Thomas de Lundin, a natural son of King William the Lion. James' paternal grandparents were Robert Lundin (1675–1716) and Anne Inglis (a daughter of Sir James Inglis of Cramond). His grandfather Robert was a younger son of John Drummond, 1st Earl of Melfort (younger son of the 3rd Earl of Perth), by his first wife, Sophia Maitland. Sophia, his great-grandmother, had inherited Lundin from her brother John Lundin of Lundin, both children of Margaret (née Lundin) Maitland and Robert Maitland (a younger son of John Maitland, 1st Earl of Lauderdale). Sophia's mother Margaret had inherited the Lundin estates upon the death of her father, John Lundin of Lundin, in 1684.

== Career ==
The younger James Lundin, now also known as Drummond, joined the British Army in 1771. On 2 September 1780 he was promoted to captain in the 2nd Battalion 42nd Highlanders, and served with the Battalion in India.

=== Claim to the earldom of Perth ===
On 6 February 1760, following the death of Edward Drummond, sixth Jacobite-jurisdiction Duke of Perth, James' father became heir to the earldom of Perth, which had been forfeit since 1716 owing to the attainder of James Drummond, 2nd Duke of Perth (the first Earl of Melfort was the younger son of James Drummond, 3rd Earl of Perth). His father, therefore, assumed the surname of Drummond and styled himself 10th Earl of Perth, and in 1776, following the death of Jean Drummond, Duchess of Perth, in 1773, he took up residence at the Drummond estate of Stobhall in Perthshire.

Upon his father's death on 18 July 1781, James succeeded to his father's claim to the earldom of Perth (his elder brother Thomas, who moved to America, had died the previous November), but did not use the title. In 1784, an Act was passed allowing the Crown to grant to the heirs-male the estates that had been forfeited in 1745, and on 8 March 1785 the Court of Session declared that he was the person entitled to the Drummond estates (including Drummond Castle), which he was duly granted. He submitted a claim to be Earl of Perth in 1792, but withdrew it in 1796, and on 26 October 1797 was created a Peer of Great Britain as Lord Perth, Baron Drummond of Stobhall in the County of Perth.

== Marriage and issue ==
On 31 March 1785, Drummond married the Hon. Clementina Elphinstone (1749–1822) in Edinburgh. Clementina was a daughter of Charles Elphinstone, 10th Lord Elphinstone, and Lady Clementina Fleming (daughter of John Fleming, 6th Earl of Wigton). Together, they were the parents of three children:

- James Drummond (1791–1799), who died in childhood.
- Clementina Sarah Drummond (1786–1865), who married Peter Robert Burrell on 20 October 1807; they adopted the surname of Drummond in addition to that of Burrell by Royal Licence on 6 November that year. He succeeded his father as Baron Gwydyr in 1820 and his mother as Baron Willoughby de Eresby in 1828. As the Hon. Mrs Drummond Burrell she was one of the Lady Patronesses of Almack's in 1814 as described in Captain Gronow's memoirs.
- Jemima Rachel Drummond (1787–1788), who died in infancy.

Lord Perth died at Innerpeffray on 2 July 1800, at which point the barony of 1797 became extinct.

=== Legacy ===
After Lord Perth's death, the claim to the earldom of Perth was inherited by the line of the titular Dukes of Melfort, for whom it was restored on 28 June 1853, before being inherited by the Viscounts Strathallan on 28 February 1902.

Lundin had been sold to Sir William Erskine of Torry before his death, and was later inherited by James Erskine Wemyss (Lundin House was demolished in 1876, but its tower remains today). The Drummond estates were inherited under a settlement of 9 June 1800 by his daughter Clementina and her heirs. In 1953, Stobhall was passed by her descendant James Heathcote-Drummond-Willoughby, 3rd Earl of Ancaster, to the heir-male John Drummond, 8th Earl of Perth (1907–2002), while Drummond Castle remains a seat of Jane Heathcote-Drummond-Willoughby, 28th Baroness Willoughby de Eresby (b. 1934).

== In literature ==
Drummond provided the inspiration for the character Captain James Drummond in James Hogg's A Tale of an Old Highlander first published in the Metropolitan in February 1832.

Peerage of Great Britain
New creation	Baron Perth; 1797–1800	Extinct
