= Lord Drummond =

Lord Drummond may refer to:

- Lord Drummond of Cargill, created in 1488 and held since 1605 by the Earl of Perth
- Lord Drummond of Stobhall, created in 1605 along with the Earldom of Perth
- Lord Drummond of Cromlix, created in 1686 along with the Viscountcy of Strathallan
- Lord Drummond of Gilstoun, created in 1685 along with the Viscountcy of Melfort
- Lord Drummond of Riccartoun, created in 1686 along with the Earldom of Melfort
- Marquess of Drummond, created c.1701, subsidiary title of the Dukedom of Perth (see Jacobite peerage)
- Lord Perth, Baron Drummond of Stobhall, created in 1797 and extinct in 1800.

All the above titles were in the Peerage of Scotland except the 1797 Barony, which was in the Peerage of Great Britain.

Lord Drummond may also refer to:

- Lord Drummond (Pallisers), a fictional character in the Palliser series of novels by Anthony Trollope

== Specific people ==
- John Drummond, 1st Lord Drummond (died 1519), Scottish statesman
