= Chesterfield (cigarette) =

Brand of cigarette in the United States

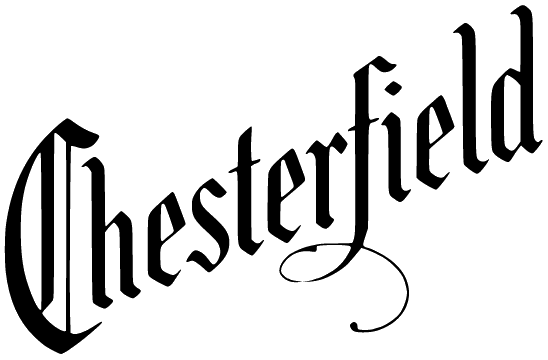

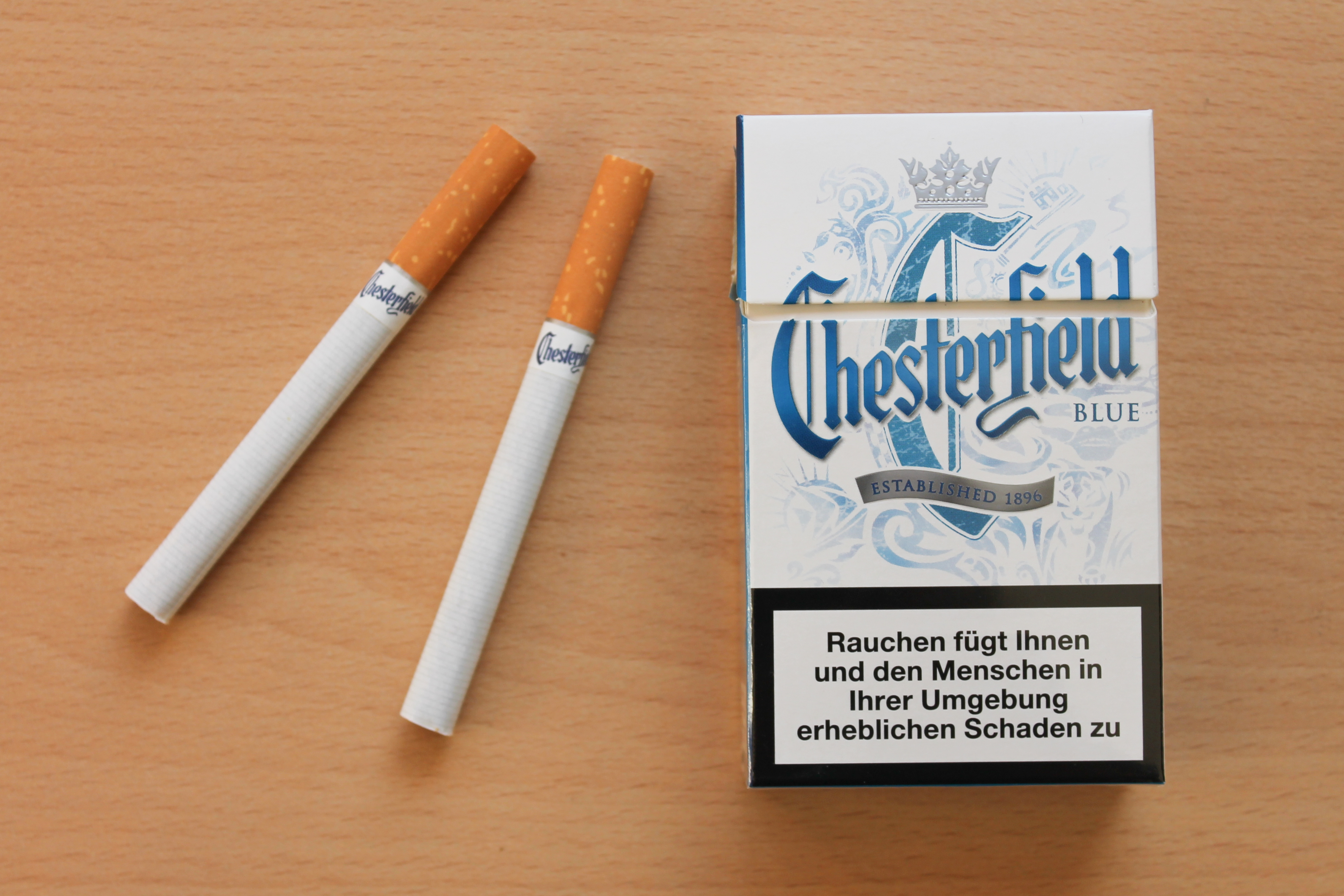
- Product type: Cigarette
- Current owner: Altria
- Produced by: Philip Morris USA
- Country: United States
- Introduced: 1896; 130 years ago
- Markets: See Markets
- Previous owners: Drummond Tobacco Company; Liggett & Myers Tobacco Company
- Tagline: "It satisfies.", "Blow some my way."

Chesterfield is a brand of cigarette, named after Chesterfield County, Virginia. The brand is owned by conglomerate Altria and produced by its subsidiary Philip Morris USA.

== History ==
Chesterfields, originally a blend of Turkish and Virginia tobacco, were introduced by the Drummond Tobacco Company of St. Louis, Missouri, in 1873. The company was acquired by American Tobacco Company in 1898, which manufactured Chesterfields until 1911. In 1912, the brand was taken over by Liggett & Myers and production moved to Durham, North Carolina. The brand was acquired by Philip Morris (now Altria) in 1999.

Chesterfield was the first cigarette to add an extra layer of wrapping to their pack to preserve moisture. In 1926, Chesterfield's "Blow some my way" advertising campaign targeted women smokers, while a 1948 advert produced for NBC claimed that the brand was "preferred by professional smokers."

In 2011, Philip Morris created three variations (Chesterfield Red, Chesterfield Blue and Chesterfield Menthol) for the UK market. In 2018, Phillip Morris discontinued Chesterfield non-filter cigarettes in the United States; shortly thereafter (January 2019), the company began limited US testing of three filtered varieties: Reds (Full Flavor), Blues (Lights), and Green (Menthol).

== Sponsorship ==
=== Formula 1 ===
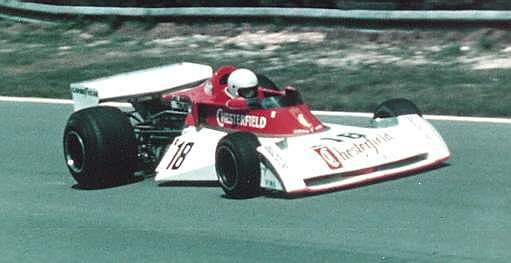
The Surtees TS 19 driven by Brett Lunger, with Chesterfield sponsoring on the front

Chesterfield was a sponsor of the Surtees team during the 1976 Formula One season and 1977 Formula One season. A second car entered in was sponsored by Chesterfield in 1977.

Chesterfield also sponsored the BMS Scuderia Italia team in the 1993 FIA Formula One World Championship. They only sponsored the team for one season due to the retirement of the team from F1 to focus on the World Touring Car Cup.

=== Motorsport ===
Chesterfield was a sponsor of Max Biaggi's Aprilia RSV 250 from the 1994 to the 1996 Grand Prix motorcycle racing season in the 250cc World Championship. The livery of the bike was totally black with the mark on the side fairings. In the same years, Aprilia adopted the same livery in the series production of its RS road bikes (in the 50, 125 and 250 cylinder sizes). They were also title sponsor of Tech3's championship winning 250cc campaign in 2000 with Olivier Jacque.

=== Dakar Rally ===
Chesterfield was the main sponsor of the motorcycle team "BYRD" (Belgarda Yamaha Racing Division) at the Paris-Dakar Rally from 1987 to 1994.

In addition, under the name "Chesterfield Scout" a collaboration with the enduro sport on a more private level. For example, at Yamaha in 1989, there was a "Chesterfield DT" with 125 cc, for the Yamaha XTZ 750 Super Ténéré gave it in its first model year in 1989, the color variant "Chesterfield."

=== Radio and TV ===
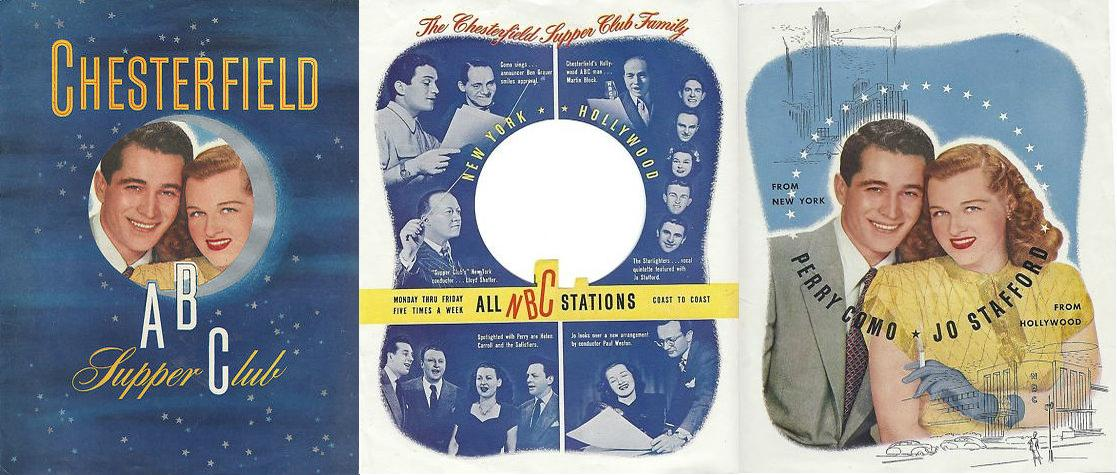
Chesterfield Supper Club promotional brochure, 1947

In the 1930s through the 1950s, Chesterfield sponsored popular radio programs. An early one was the radio series Music That Satisfies which was broadcast in 1932–1933.

The Chesterfield Hour (1939–1944) featured big bands such as those of Paul Whiteman and Glenn Miller and Fred Waring.

It was followed briefly by Johnny Mercer's Chesterfield Music Shop (1944) and then the Chesterfield Supper Club (1944–1949) which featured Perry Como and Jo Stafford with Peggy Lee replacing Stafford on some episodes beginning in 1948. Johnny Mercer originally wrote the pop standard song "Dream (When You're Feeling Blue)" as the theme song for his Chesterfield radio program; the theme for Como's Chesterfield Supper Club was the basis for "Smoke Dreams," covered by Jo Stafford, k.d. lang, and other artists.

Liggett & Myers sponsored Dragnet, both on radio and on TV, during the 1950s. The 1954 theatrical version of Dragnet also had Chesterfield product placements, such as advertisements in scenes taking place at drug stores and news counters, or cigarette vending machines. Jack Webb as Sgt. Joe Friday was seen smoking Chesterfields in the movie and TV series. The Martin and Lewis Show, on NBC radio from 1949 to 1953, was sponsored or co-sponsored for most of its run by Chesterfield. Also in the 1950s, Gunsmoke on both radio and TV was similarly sponsored primarily by Chesterfields and L&Ms.

In 1963, Rod Serling the creator of The Twilight Zone "often seen smoking a cigarette while narrating the Intro and Outro to his episodes" frequently smoked and promoted Chesterfield Cigarettes at the end of the episodes, usually following the famous quote "They Satisfy."

In the 1940s and 1950s Ronald Reagan, Bob Hope, Bing Crosby, Perry Como, and Arthur Godfrey were among Chesterfield's official spokesmen; Chesterfield being one of the primary sponsors of the radio and TV programs of these stars during that time.

== Markets ==
Chesterfield is sold in: Albania, Argentina, Australia, Austria, Belgium, Bosnia and Herzegovina, Brazil, Costa Rica, Croatia, Czech Republic, Estonia, Finland, France, Germany, Greece, Hungary, Israel, Italy, Kuwait, Kosovo, Latvia, Lithuania, Luxembourg, Malaysia, Malta, Mexico, Moldova, Morocco, Netherlands, New Zealand, North Macedonia, Paraguay, Poland, Portugal, Philippines, Romania, Russia, Saudi Arabia, Singapore, Slovenia, South Africa, Spain, Sweden, Switzerland, Turkey, Ukraine, United Arab Emirates, United Kingdom, United States.

== In popular culture ==
=== Novels ===
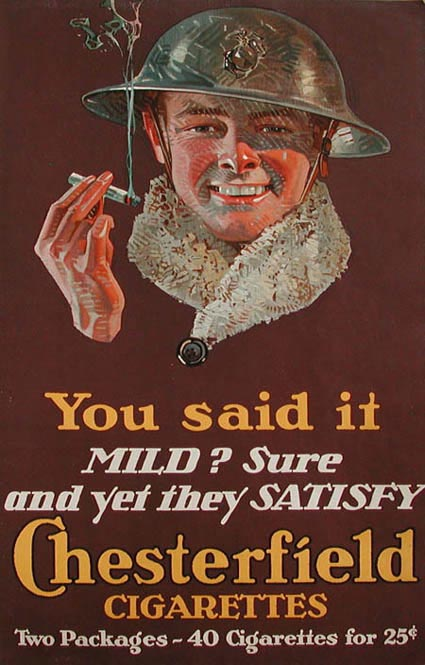
A Book of Progressive Prints, published in 1918, featured a Chesterfield ad on its cover.

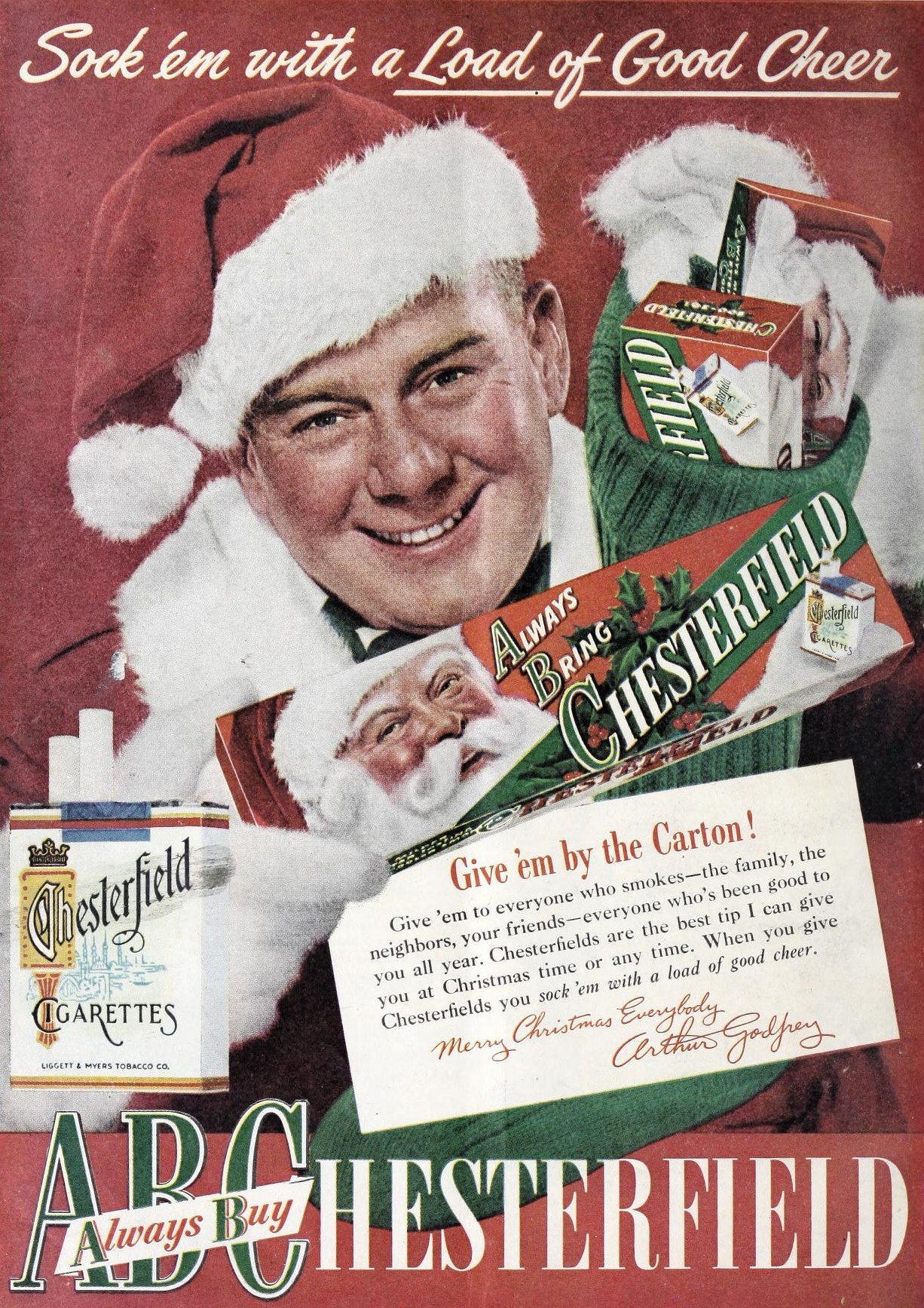
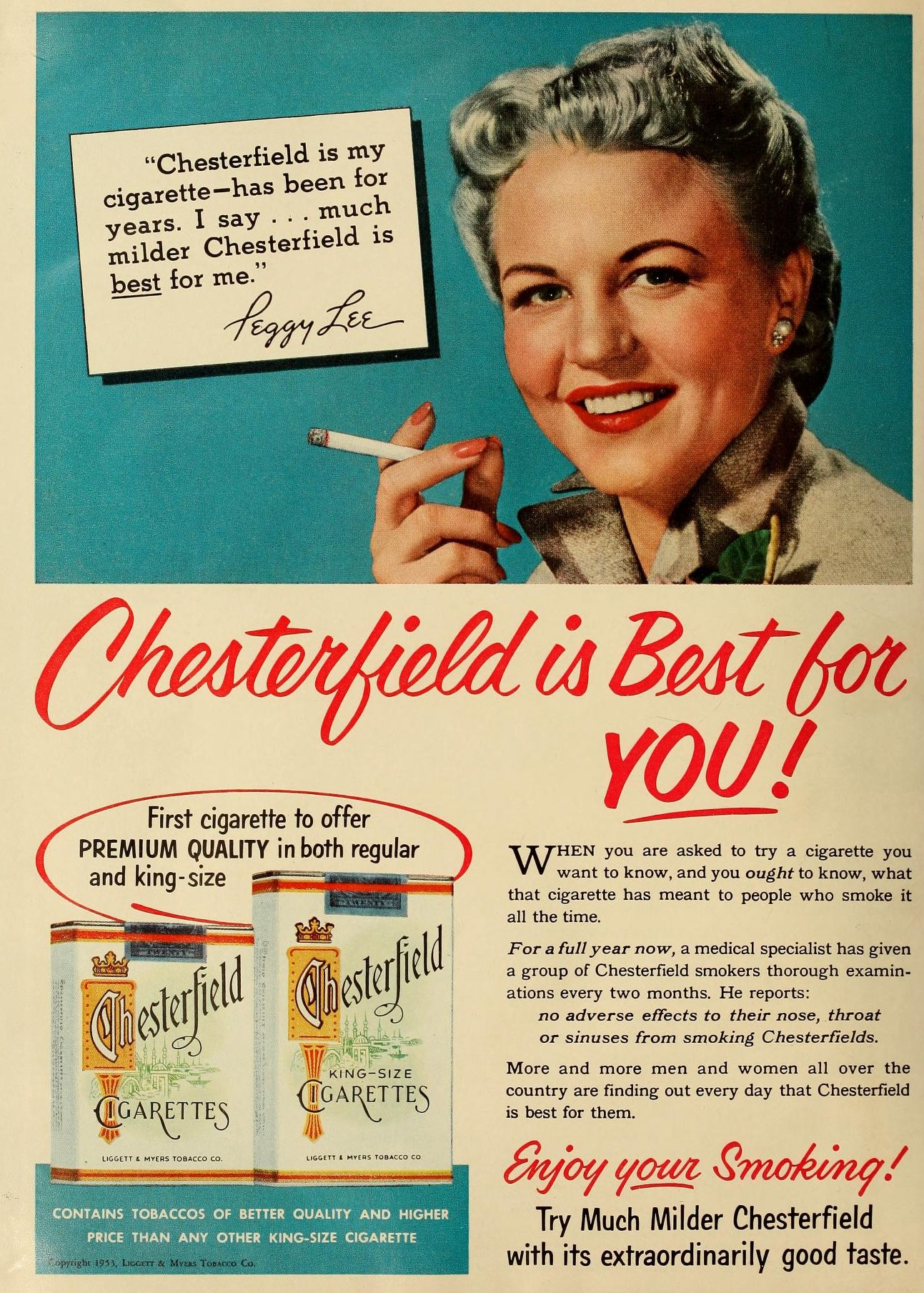
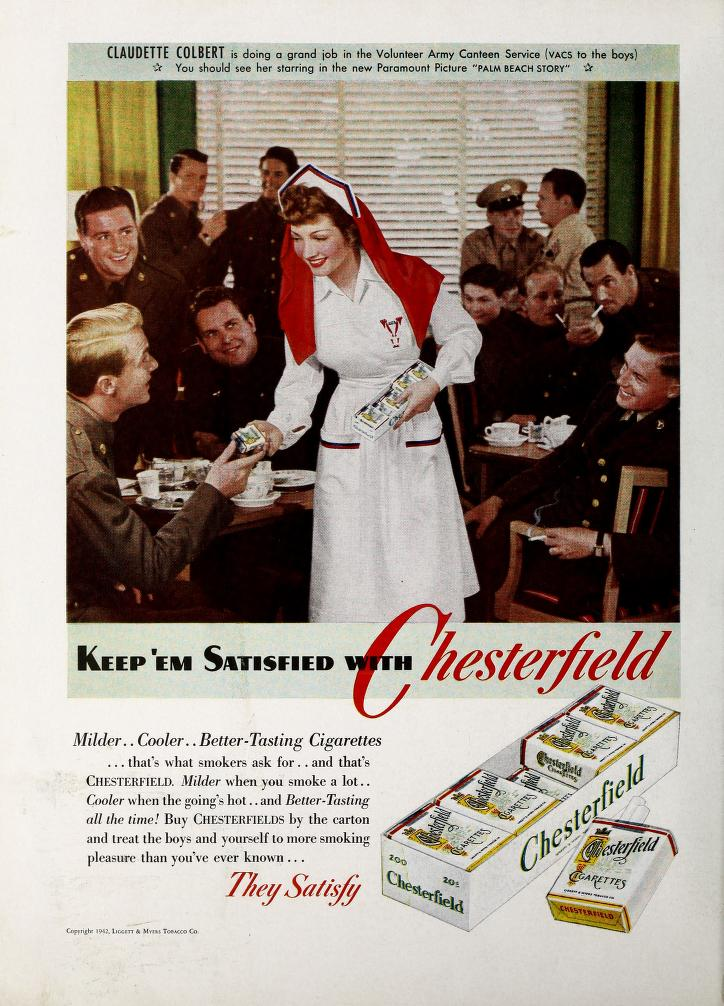
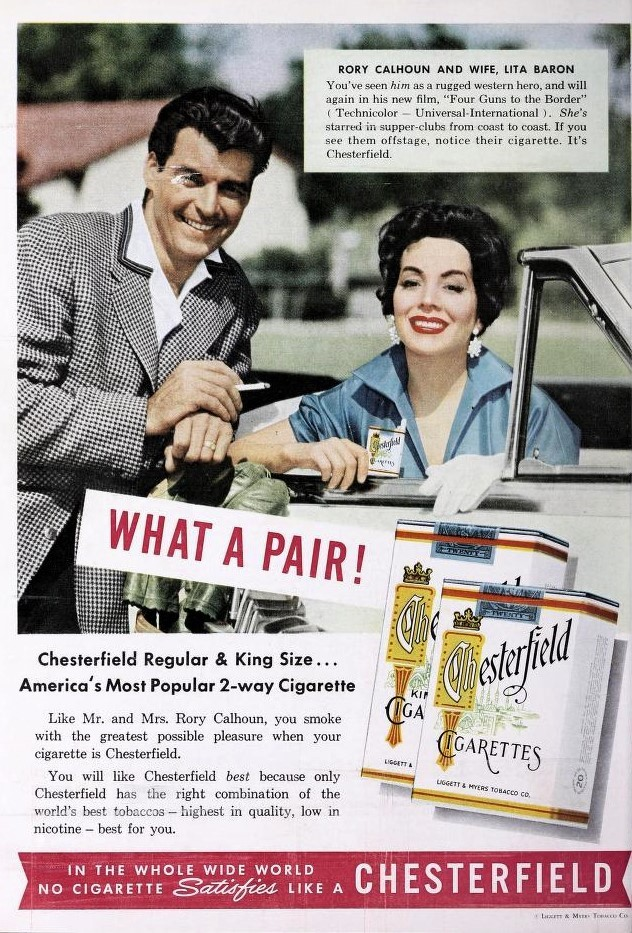
Chesterfield advertisements, some of them featuring famous or notable personalities of the time. TOP, left to right: Arthur Godfrey (1948), Peggy Lee (1953); BOTTOM, left to right: Claudette Colbert (1942), Rory Calhoun and Lita Baron (1955)

Ian Fleming frequently makes references to different smoking products in his famous James Bond novels. The Chesterfield brand of cigarette are portrayed as one of Bond's favorites as seen in the 1959 book Goldfinger. In this novel, James Bond demands of Goldfinger's servant, "Oddjob, I want a lot of food, quickly. And a bottle of bourbon, soda and ice. Also a carton of Chesterfields, king-size...."

In numerous Stephen King novels, his characters frequently smoke Chesterfield cigarettes. In King's 2000 book On Writing, he wrote that Chesterfield was the first brand he smoked, and that his World War II veteran uncle dismissed them as "stockade cigarettes."

In Oscar Hijuelos' Pulitzer Prize winning novel The Mambo Kings Play Songs of Love, several main characters smoke Chesterfield cigarettes.

In Toni Morrison's novel Paradise, the character Gigi decides to chat with the man with an earring, "just to talk to someone who wasn't encased in polyester and who looked like he might smoke something other than Chesterfields."

=== Television series ===
In the 2010 HBO TV series Boardwalk Empire, Agent Knox is seen giving three packs of Chesterfield cigarettes to Clayton.

In the 2020 miniseries The Queen's Gambit, Beth Harmon's adoptive mother asks Beth to run to the store to pick up three packs of Chesterfields.

In the Netflix series The Crown, Princess Margaret’s favorite cigarettes are Chesterfields. In real life, the Princess was known to smoke up to sixty cigarettes per day.

=== Films ===
Humphrey Bogart frequently appeared in Chesterfield advertisements. A scene from the 1944 movie To Have and Have Not shows him with a pack of Chesterfields.

In the 1958 movie South Pacific, Joe Cabel (John Kerr) is seen taking a Chesterfield out of a pack as he arrives at the Navy base.

A Chesterfield placement appeared in Jean-Luc Godard's 1960 film Breathless in which the cigarette smoked by the actress Jean Seberg is a Chesterfield.

Vittorio Gassman bought two packs of Chesterfield cigarettes in the movie Il Sorpasso.

In Jack Clayton's 1974 adaptation of The Great Gatsby, Gatsby (Robert Redford) splits the last Chesterfield in his pack with Nick Carraway (Sam Waterston) while the two chat on Carraway's porch. Nick Carraway is a thinly-disguised F. Scott Fitzgerald in The Great Gatsby. Fitzgerald's favorite cigarette was Chesterfield, so the scene is an accurate adaptation.

Jake Blues (John Belushi) smoked Chesterfield cigarettes in the 1980 film The Blues Brothers. Near the end of the scene at Bob's Country Bunker, Jake is seen briefly flashing a flattened and nearly empty pack of Chesterfield cigarettes, pretending it is his musician's union ID card.

In Jim Jarmusch's 1984 film Stranger Than Paradise the main characters smoke Chesterfields, at times discussing where they can purchase them.

In the 1989 film Fratelli d'Italia, Jerry Calà draws a pack of Chesterfield Reds several times.

In Quentin Tarantino's 1992 movie Reservoir Dogs, Mr. White offers Mr. Pink a Chesterfield cigarette in an attempt to calm him. In another Tarantino-penned movie, 1993's True Romance, Clarence Worley's father, Clifford, smokes a Chesterfield before his execution at the hands of Blue Lou Boyle's consigliere, Vincenzo Coccotti.

In the 1994 film The Shawshank Redemption, Red (Morgan Freeman) is seen giving a pack of Chesterfield cigarettes to Heywood (William Sadler) after losing the "Fresh Fish" bet. Heywood sniffs the cigarettes and says "Yes, Richmond, Virginia."

In the Coen brothers' 2001 The Man Who Wasn't There, a black and white neo-noir film set in 1949, the main character is an unfiltered Chesterfield chain smoker.

In the 2005 film Memoirs of a Geisha, after Pumpkin has immersed herself in World War II American soldier culture, she tells Sayuri that she only smokes Chesterfields now.

In the 2007 film Grindhouse, the actor Kurt Russell extracts a Chesterfield pack out of his pocket.

In 2018, Norman Newlander (Alan Arkin) mentions smoking Chesterfield cigarettes when he was younger in Chuck Lorre's American comedy-drama series The Kominsky Method (Season One: Episode 6, ~11min).

=== Music ===
The 1992 Jawbreaker song "Chesterfield King" refers to the cigarette twice. First, the singer shares a Chesterfield with a woman he meets in a parking lot. Later, at the end of the song, the singer gives a Chesterfield King to the woman he has been singing about.

Donald Fagen's 1982 album The Nightfly features a pack of Chesterfield Kings on the cover and the brand is also mentioned in the title song "The Nightfly" whereby the lyrics go: "I've got plenty of Java and Chesterfield kings...."

Punk band Dropkick Murphys have a song on their 2025 album, For the People, titled "Chesterfields and Aftershave" that is about singer Ken Casey's grandfather.

=== Celebrities ===
J. Robert Oppenheimer was a chain smoker of Chesterfields.

The Hollywood actor Paul Douglas, who died of a heart attack at age 52, advertised them.

== See also ==
- Tobacco smoking
