= John Drummond, 1st Earl of Melfort =

Scottish politician (1650–1715)

The Right Honourable The Earl of Melfort PC
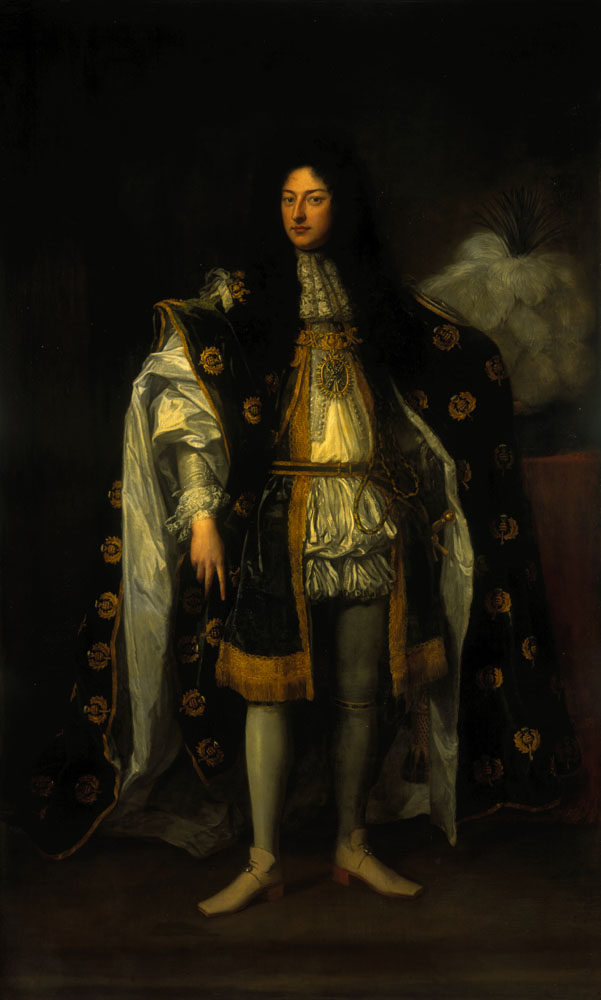
- c. 1668 portrait of Melfort

Jacobite Secretary of State
- In office 6 December 1688 – 2 June 1694
- Monarch: James II
- Succeeded by: Earl of Middleton

Secretary of State in Scotland
- In office 15 September 1684 – 4 December 1688
- Preceded by: Earl of Moray
- Succeeded by: Earl of Melville

Treasurer-Depute
- In office 1682–1684
- Preceded by: Earl of Lauderdale
- Succeeded by: Earl of Kintore

Master of the Ordnance
- In office 1680–1682

Personal details
- Born: John Drummond; 8 August 1649 Stobhall, Perthshire, Scotland
- Died: 25 January 1715 (aged 65) Paris
- Resting place: Saint-Sulpice, Paris
- Party: Jacobite
- Spouse(s): Sophia Maitland (died ca 1680); Euphemia Wallace
- Children: Robert Lundin (d 1713); John Drummond, Earl of Melfort (1682–1754) plus 16 others
- Parent(s): The Earl of Perth (ca 1615–1675); Lady Anne Gordon (ca 1621–1656);
- Education: St Andrews
- Occupation: Politician
- Awards: Order of the Thistle; Order of the Garter (Jacobite)

John Drummond, 1st Earl of Melfort, styled Duke of Melfort in the Jacobite peerage (8 August 1650 – 25 January 1715), was a Scottish politician and close advisor to James VII & II. A Catholic convert, Melfort and his brother the Earl of Perth consistently urged James not to compromise with his opponents, contributing to his increasing isolation and ultimate deposition in the 1688 Glorious Revolution.

In exile, Melfort became the first Jacobite Secretary of State but his unpopularity with other Jacobites led to his resignation in 1694. He served as James' Papal Ambassador in Rome but failed to regain his former influence and retired from active politics. He died in Paris on 25 January 1715.

== Life ==
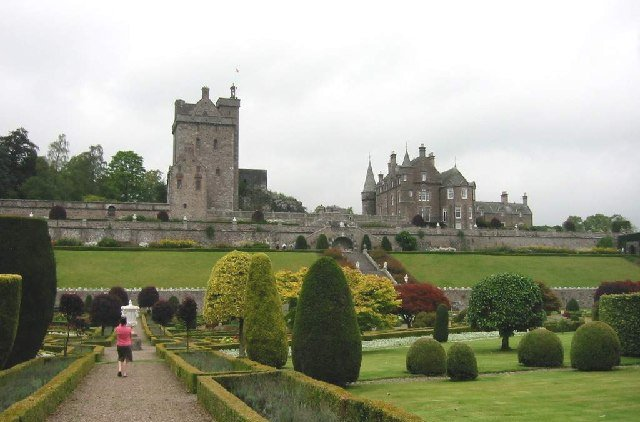
Drummond Castle and gardens

John Drummond, later Earl of Melfort, was born in 1649, probably at Stobhall in Perthshire since the family home Drummond Castle was then occupied by the New Model Army. The second son of James Drummond, 3rd Earl of Perth (c. 1615–1675) and Lady Anne Gordon (c. 1621–1656), his elder brother James Drummond, 4th Earl of Perth, was a close political ally.

In September 1670, Melfort married Sophia Maitland, heiress to the estate of Lundin in Fife and niece of the Duke of Lauderdale; they had six children before her death in 1680. After his exile, his titles and property were confiscated in 1695, except for Sophia's estates, which were transferred to their surviving children in December 1688. Thereafter, they had little contact with their father and used the name 'Lundin'.

After Sophia's death in 1680, he married Euphemia Wallace (ca. 1654–1743) and they had another seven children, who grew up in France. John Drummond, 2nd Earl of Melfort, took part in the Jacobite rising of 1715, while his grandsons, John and Louis Drummond, fought at Culloden in 1746 with the Royal Écossais Regiment and ended their careers as senior French officers.

== Career ==
=== Scottish politician (1670–1688) ===
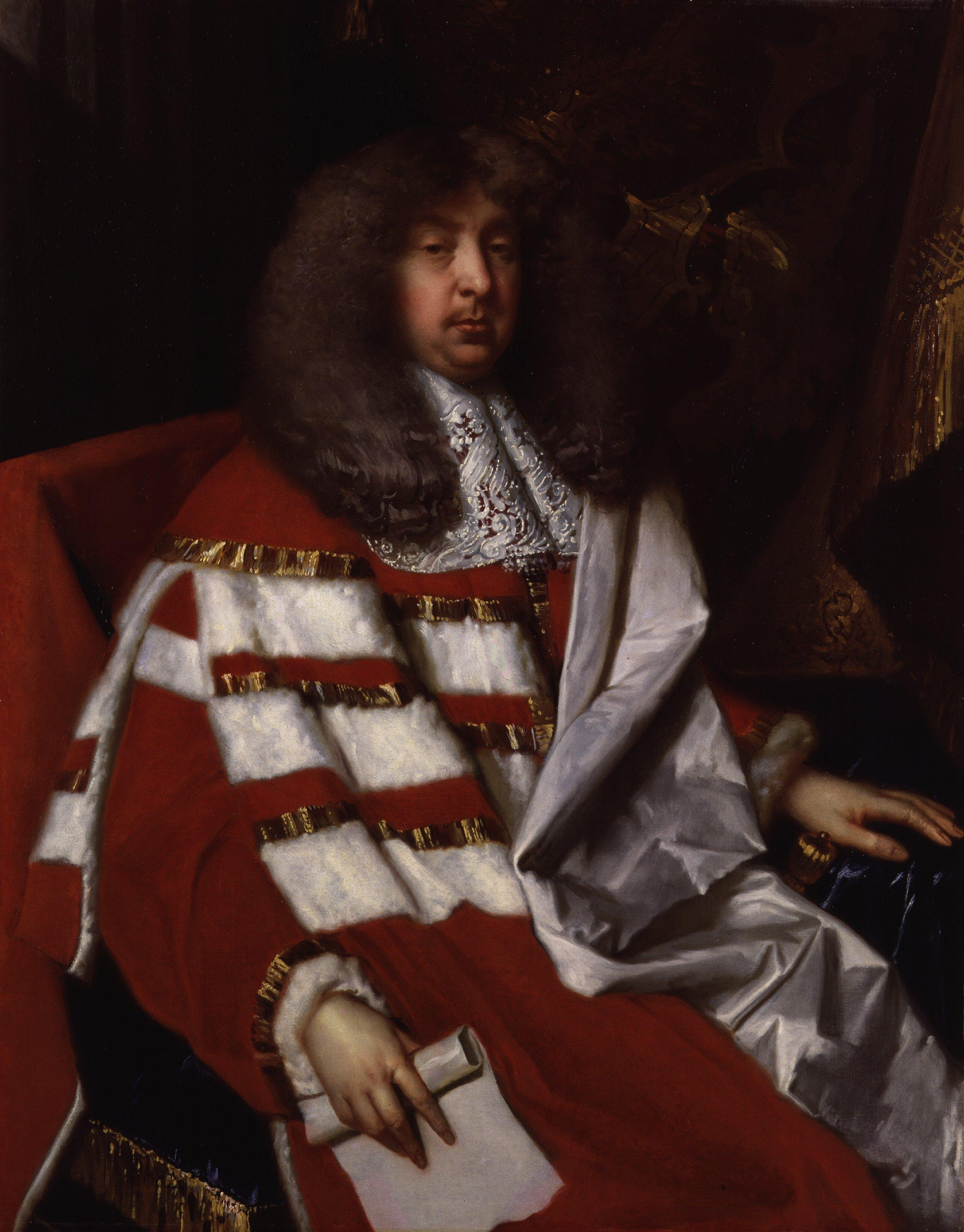
John Maitland, Duke of Lauderdale; Drummond's marriage to his niece helped his political career

Lauderdale was the Crown's representative in Scotland and marriage to his niece brought Melfort lands and positions; in September 1673, he received a commission as Captain in the Foot Guards. He was appointed Deputy Governor of Edinburgh Castle in 1679, then Lieutenant-General and Master of the Ordnance in 1680.

Charles II had numerous illegitimate children but no legitimate ones, leaving James as heir. His conversion to Catholicism and the perceived threat posed by the policies of Louis XIV resulted in the anti-Catholic Popish Plot and the 1679–1681 Exclusion Crisis. This split the English political class between those who wanted to 'exclude' James from the throne, or Whigs, and their opponents, or Tories. He had greater support in Scotland but Lauderdale resigned in 1680 after voting for the execution of Viscount Stafford, one of those falsely condemned by the Popish Plot.

In 1681, James became Lord High Commissioner to the Parliament of Scotland and created a Scottish support base including the Drummonds, Queensberry and Hamilton. With their help, the Scottish Parliament passed the 1681 Test Act. This required government officers to swear unconditional loyalty to the monarch, 'regardless of religion'; but with the crucial qualifier they also 'promise to uphold the true Protestant religion.' Melfort was appointed Treasurer-Depute of Scotland in 1682, then joint Secretary of State, Scotland in 1684, with his brother as Lord Chancellor.

The 1638–1651 Wars of the Three Kingdoms meant many feared the consequences of bypassing James and he became king with widespread support in all three kingdoms, England, Scotland and Ireland. In England and Scotland, this assumed he did nothing to weaken the Protestant Church of England and Church of Scotland and it was a short-term issue, not the prelude to a Catholic dynasty. In 1685, James was 52, his second marriage was childless after 14 years and the heirs were his Protestant daughters, Mary and Anne. These were increasingly challenged in the years leading up to the crisis of June 1688 and Melfort bears much of the responsibility.

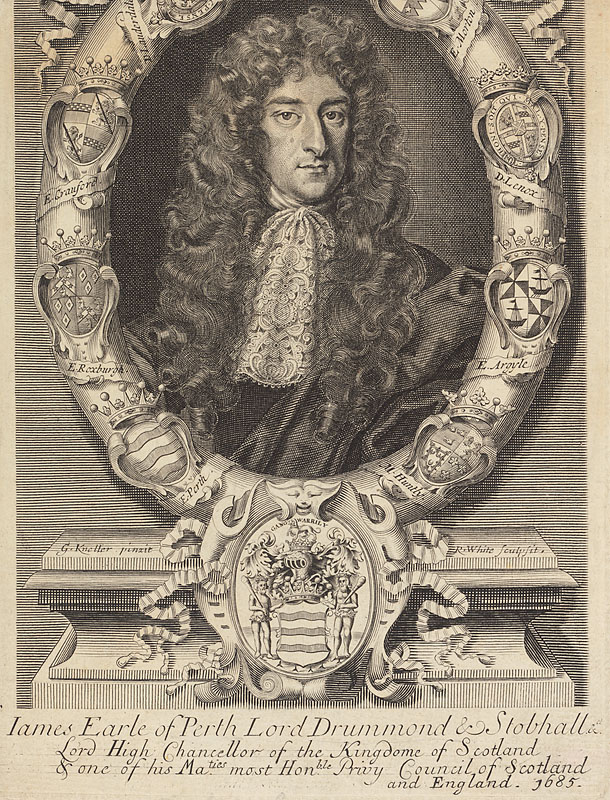
James Drummond, Earl of Perth, his elder brother and political ally, was arrested in 1688 and then sent into exile in 1694

The brothers effectively ruled Scotland but after 1684, most of their time was spent in London and disconnected them from political developments there. As a result, James often pursued policies in Scotland based on information either out of date or wrong, most significantly that acceptance of his personal beliefs did not extend to Catholicism in general. His 'tolerance' measures were badly timed, particularly when the October 1685 Edict of Fontainebleau revoked it for French Huguenots, reinforcing fears Protestant Europe was threatened by a French-led Catholic counter-reformation.

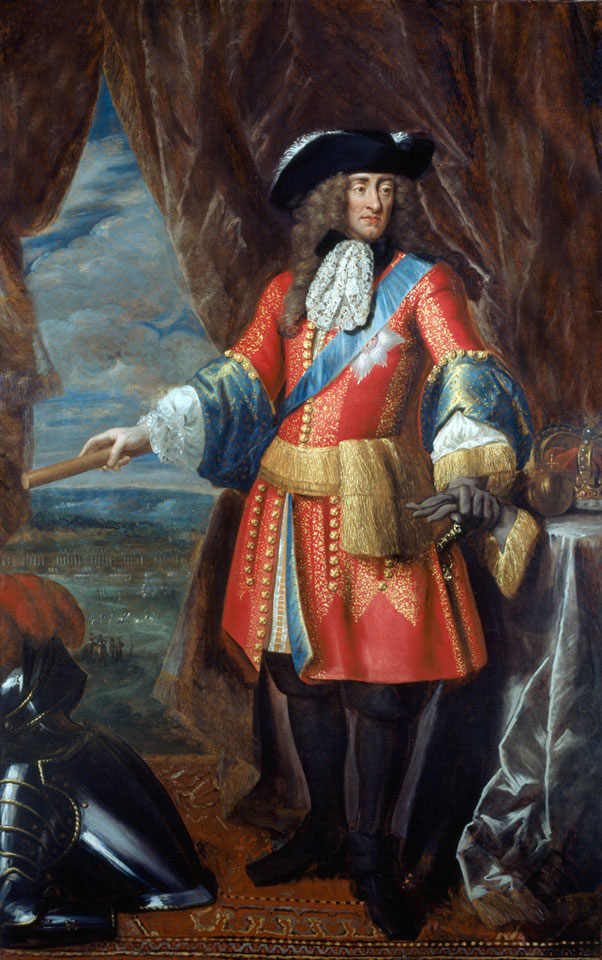
James c. 1685, as commander of the Royal Army; his expansion of the army was viewed as another sign of absolutist policies

Converting to Catholicism in 1685 meant the Drummonds further isolated themselves, while backing policies that undermined support for James; even moderate Catholics were concerned by these. The religious divides of the 17th century meant many Scots saw concessions as potentially destabilising, which resulted in the rapid collapse of the 1685 Argyll and Monmouth Rebellions. In 1686, the Scottish Parliament was suspended and Queensberry forced from office after refusing to back 'tolerance' for Catholics and Presbyterian dissidents.

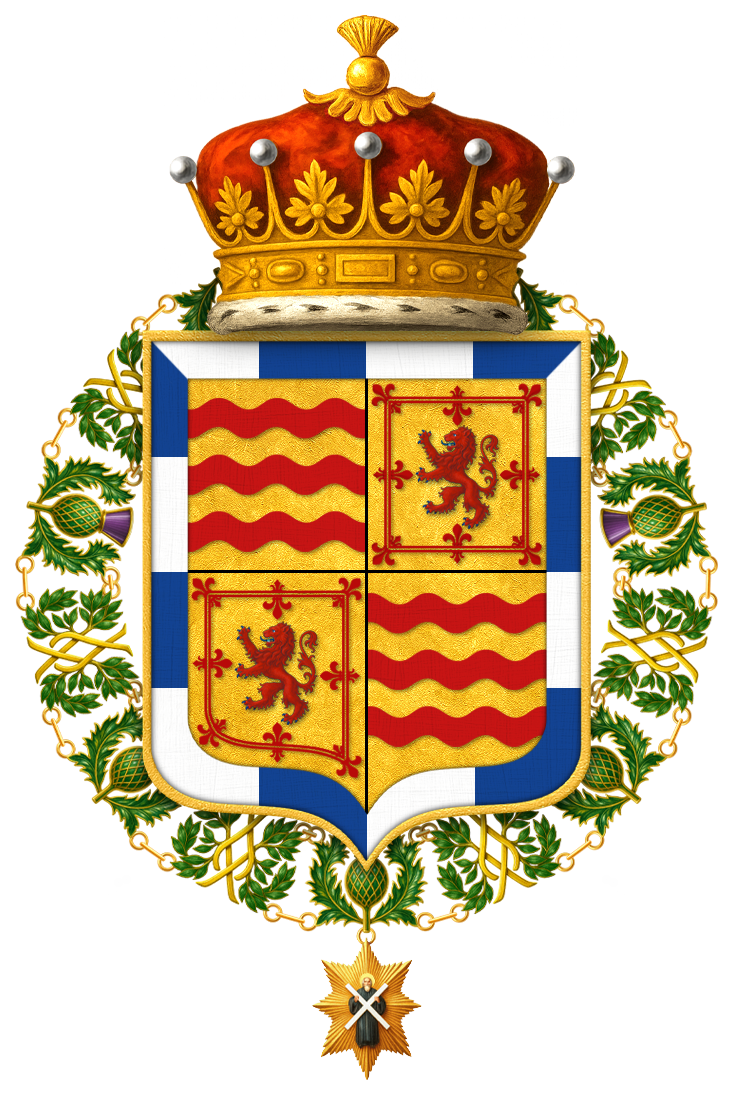
Arms of John Drummond, 1st Earl of Melfort, surmounting the collar of the Order of the Thistle

In 1686, Melfort was created Earl of Melfort and appointed to the Privy Council of England, causing deep resentment among English Tories; it also meant James' closest advisor was isolated from the political class in Scotland and England. He was also the driving force behind the Order of the Thistle, a body intended to reward James' Scottish supporters, whose members included Catholics like Melfort, his elder brother the Earl of Perth, the Earl of Dumbarton, plus Protestants like the Earl of Arran.

Two events in June 1688 turned opposition into open revolt; the birth of James Francis Edward on 10th created a Catholic heir, excluding James' Protestant daughter Mary and her husband William of Orange. By prosecuting the Seven Bishops for seditious libel, James appeared to be going beyond tolerance for Catholicism and into an assault on the Church of England; their acquittal on 30 June destroyed his political authority, in Scotland as well as England.

In 1685, many feared civil war if James were bypassed; by 1688, anti-Catholic riots made that it seem only his removal could prevent one. Representatives from across the political class invited William to assume the English throne, and he landed in Brixham on 5 November. Melfort urged a mass arrest of influential Whigs in response but James' army deserted him and he went into exile on 23 December.

=== Jacobite exile (1688–1714) ===
Those who remained loyal to James became known as 'Jacobites,' after the Latin Jacobus, and the political ideology behind it as Jacobitism. Melfort left London on 3 December 1688 with his wife Euphemia and the seven children of his second marriage; a few days later, he arrived at Saint-Germain-en-Laye outside Paris, location of the exiled court for the next 25 years. The English Parliament offered William and Mary the throne of England in February, with elections in Scotland for a Convention to decide the fate of the Scottish throne.

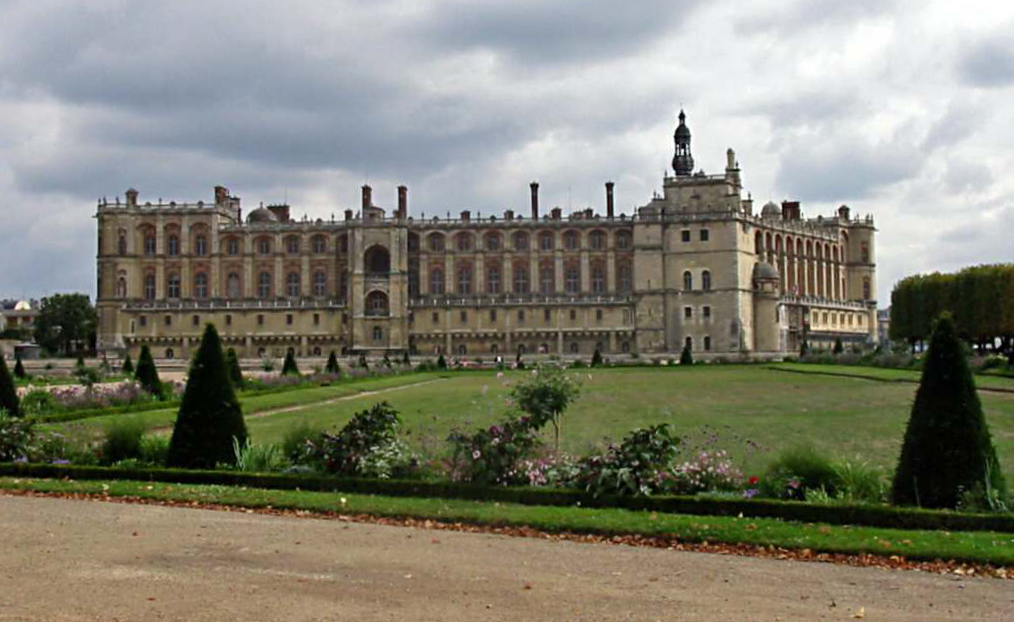
Château de Saint-Germain-en-Laye, location of the exiled Jacobite court

France was engaged in the 1688–1697 Nine Years' War against the Grand Alliance, Austria, the Dutch Republic and England. In order to weaken his opponents, Louis provided James military support to regain his kingdoms and in March 1689, he landed in Ireland, with Melfort as Secretary of State. The Scottish Convention was meeting in Edinburgh and when it opened on 16 March, a letter drafted by Melfort was read out, demanding obedience and threatening punishment for noncompliance.

Although committed Jacobites were a tiny minority, many Scots were unenthusiastic about the alternatives; the letter caused public anger and demonstrated James had learned nothing from the events that led to his deposition. The tone reflected an internal Jacobite dispute between the Protestant 'Compounders', who viewed concessions as essential to regain the throne, and the mostly-Catholic 'Non-Compounders' like Melfort, who urged him to refuse any. Based on an overly optimistic reading of the military situation in 1689, the dominance of Melfort and Non-Compounders over Jacobite policy persisted until 1694.

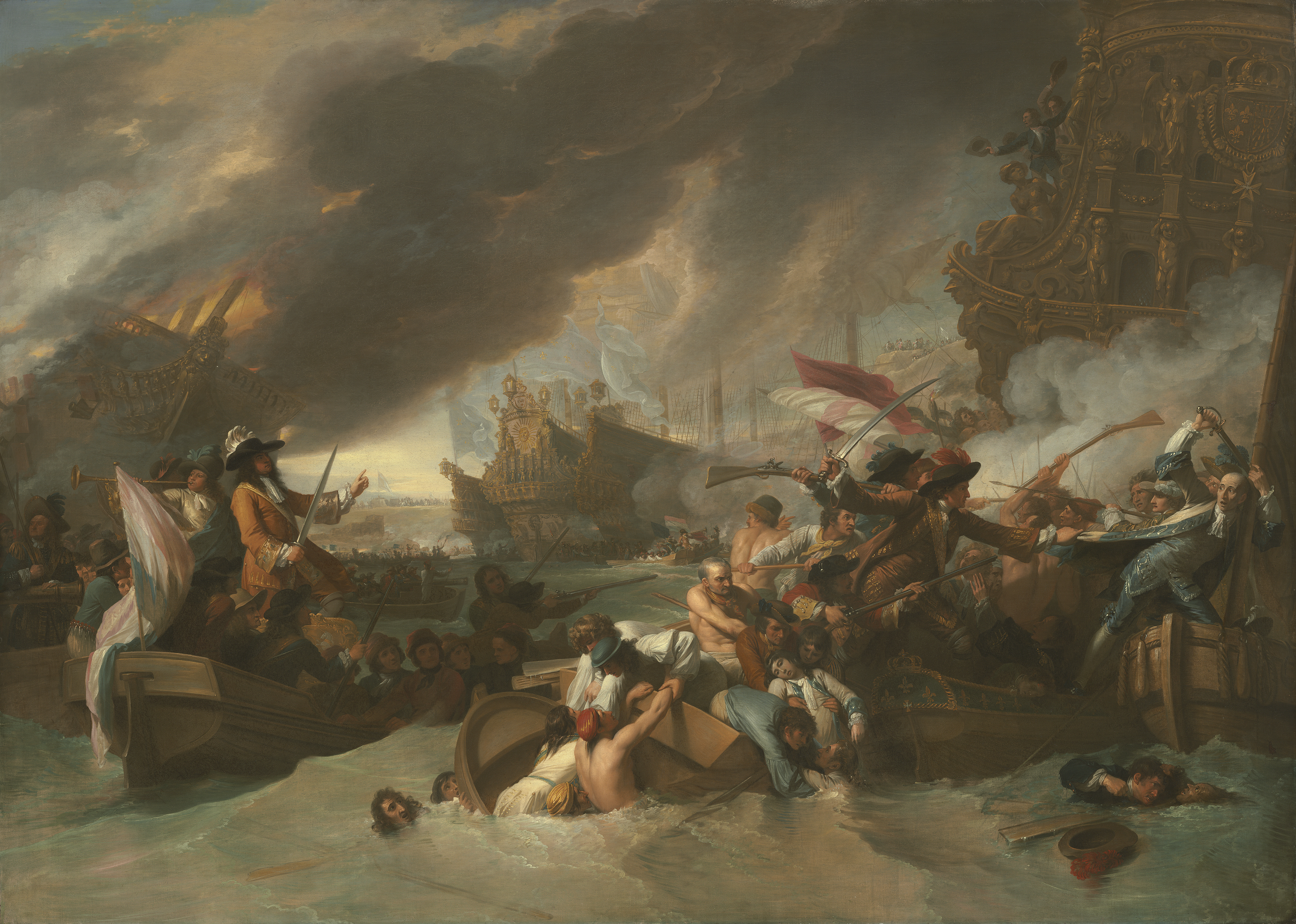
Defeat at La Hogue in June 1692, ended plans for an invasion of England

Melfort consistently prioritised England and Scotland over Ireland, leading to clashes with the Irish Jacobite leader, the Earl of Tyrconnell, and the French ambassador, the comte d'Avaux. He was recalled in October 1689 and sent to Rome as James's ambassador but was unsuccessful in persuading either Pope Alexander VIII or Pope Innocent XII to support James and returned to St Germain in 1691. Jacobite defeats in Scotland in 1690 and Ireland in 1691 were followed by the collapse of plans to invade England after the Anglo-Dutch naval victory at La Hogue in June 1692.

In April 1692, James issued a statement drafted by Melfort making it clear that once restored, he would not pardon those who failed to show their loyalty. Melfort's encouragement of James' intransigence lost him support with the French and English Jacobites. The Protestant Earl of Middleton was more moderate and joined the Court at St Germain in 1693 as joint Secretary but Melfort was forced to resign in June 1694.

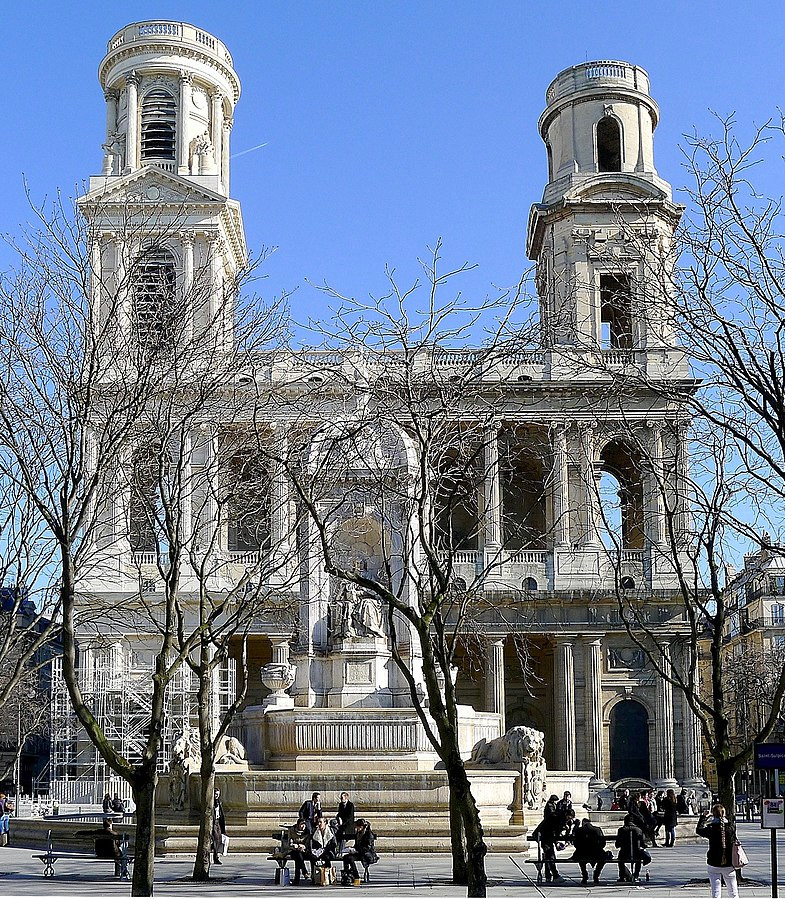
Melfort was buried at Saint-Sulpice, Paris

Melfort retired to Orléans and then Rouen. He was allowed to return to St Germain in 1697, but his political career was effectively over, as was confirmed in 1701 when a letter written to his brother was misdirected to London, leading to accusations of treachery. After the death of James in 1701, Melfort lived in Paris. He died in January 1714 and was buried in the Church of Saint-Sulpice, Paris.

In general, history has not been kind to Melfort, his influence being seen as largely negative and described by one historian as 'based on flattery, officiousness and subservience' to James' 'exalted conception of prerogative'.

Melfort's judgement in art was reputedly more astute than his political sense. He created two important collections; the first included works by Van Dyck, Rubens, Bassano, and Holbein but was left behind in 1688. He built another in Paris, which was open to the public but later sold by Euphemia, who lived to be 90.

== Sources ==
- Dalton, Charles; The Scots Army 1661–1688; (Eyre & Spottiswoode, 1909);
- Dangeau, Philippe de Courcillon, marquis de (1858), Conches, Feuillet de (ed.), Journal du marquis de Dangeau (in French), vol. 15, Paris: Firmin Didot Frères - Describes 1713–1715
- Glozier, Matthew; Scottish Soldiers in France in the Reign of the Sun King: Nursery for Men of Honour; (Brill, 2004);
- Harris, Tim; Politics under the Later Stuarts: Party Conflict in a Divided Society, 1660–1715; (Routledge, 1993);
- Harris, Tim; Revolution; the Great Crisis of the British Monarchy 1685–1720; (Penguin, 2007);
- Harris, Tim, Taylor, Stephen, eds; The Final Crisis of the Stuart Monarchy; (Boydell & Brewer, 2015);
- Lord, Evelyn; The Stuarts' Secret Army: English Jacobites 1689–1752: The Hidden History of the English Jacobites; (Pearson, 2004);
- Miggelbrink, Joachim (author) McKilliop, Andrew and Murdoch, Steve, eds; Fighting for Identity: Scottish Military Experiences c.1550–1900; (Brill, 2002);
- Szechi, Daniel; The Jacobites: Britain and Europe, 1688–1788; (Manchester University Press, 1994);
- Wormsley, David; James II: The Last Catholic King; (Allen Lane, 2015);
- "Proceedings against John Earl of Melfort, John Earl of Middletoun, Richard Earl of Lauderdale, and several others, for treason and rebellion, inciting the French King to invade their Majesties Dominions, and remaining subject to the French King". A Complete Collection of State Trials and Proceedings for High Treason and Other Crimes and Misdemeanors. 13 (411, column 1441). 1812.

Political offices
Preceded by The Earl of Moray; The Earl of Middleton	Secretary of State, Scotland; 1684–1688 with The Earl of Moray	Succeeded by The Earl of Melville
New post	Jacobite Secretary of State to James II and VII in exile 1689–1694 with The Earl of Middleton (1693–1694)	Succeeded by The Earl of Middleton
Peerage of Scotland
New creation	Earl of Melfort; 1686–1695	Attainted
New creation	Viscount of Melfort; 1685–1695	Attainted
New creation	— TITULAR — Duke of Melfort; Jacobite peerage 1692–1714	Succeeded by John Drummond
New creation	— TITULAR — Earl of Melfort; Jacobite peerage 1695–1714	Succeeded by John Drummond
Peerage of England
New creation	— TITULAR — Baron Cleworth; Jacobite Peerage; 1689–1714	Succeeded by John Drummond
