= Clan Drummond =

Highland Scottish clan

- An Druimeanaich
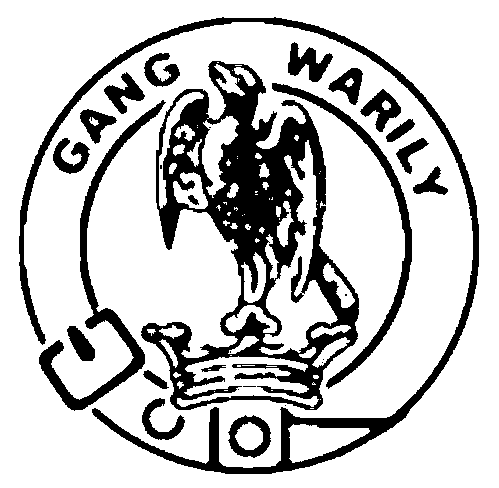
- Crest: On a crest coronet Or, a goshhawk wings displayed Proper, armed and belled Or, jessed Gules
- Motto: Virtutem coronat honos (Honour crowns virtue)

Profile
- Region: Highlands
- District: Perthshire
- Plant badge: Wild thyme; Holly
- Pipe music: The Duke of Perth's March

Chief
- James David Drummond
- The 10th Earl of Perth de jure 19th Earl and 16th titular (Jacobite Peerage) Duke of Perth
- Seat: Stobhall Castle
- Historic seat: Drummond Castle
Septs of Clan Drummond
Begg, Brewer, Cargill, Doak, Doig, Grewar, Gruer, MacCrouther, MacGrewar, MacGrowther, MacGruder, Magruder, MacGruther, MacRobbie, Robbie
Clan branches
Drummond of Perth (chiefs)
Drummond of Strathallan

Clan Drummond is a Highland Scottish clan. The surname is rendered "Druimeanach" in modern Scottish Gaelic.

== History ==
=== Origins of the clan ===
==== Traditional origins ====
West of Stirling is the parish of Drymen and its name appears to have been derived from the Scottish Gaelic, dromainn which means a ridge or high ground. There is a traditional legend that states that the first nobleman to settle in Drymen was a Hungarian prince called Maurice, who accompanied Edgar Ætheling, an Anglo-Saxon prince, on his escape from William the Conqueror and the Norman Conquest of England. These royal fugitives were warmly welcomed by Malcolm III of Scotland, who married one of the royal sisters, Margaret, later Saint Margaret of Scotland.

The early traditional line starts with one Sir Maurice de Drummond, 1st Thane of Lennox (1060-Alnwick, 13 November 1093), who married Margaret de Drymen (1060-?), continuing with their two sons Sir Malcolm de Drummond, 2nd Thane of Lennox (Drymen, c. 1075–1131), and George de Drummond (Perthshire, abt. 1093-?), the first of whom also had two sons, Sir Maurice de Drummond, 3rd Thane of Lennox (Drymen, 1100–1155), and John de Drummond (1105–1155), the earliest of whom also having two sons, Sir John de Drummond, 4th Thane of Lennox (Drymen, 1135-Drymen, 1180), and Malcolm de Drummond (abt. 1125–1180), of whom the eldest was the father of Sir Malcolm de Drummond, 5th Thane of Lennox (Drymen, c. 1165-Stirling, 1200), who married Margaret de Lindsay (Kilmarnock, 1160-Kilmarnock, c. 1240), sister of Sir William de Lindsay, and also had two sons, Sir Malcolm Beg de Drummond, 6th Thane of Lennox (aft. 1169–1259), and Roderick de Drummond (Drymen, abt. 1195-bef. 1283, m. Perthshire, abt. 1233).

==== Recorded origins ====
The first attested chief of Clan Drummond to appear documented in written records was Sir Malcolm Beg de Drummond, Chamberlain and Thane of Lennox (aft. 1169–1259), who married before 1260 Ada of Lennox, the daughter of Maol Domhnaich, Earl of Lennox, and wife Elizabeth or Beatrix Stewart. Gilbert de Drumund of Dumbarton appears on the Ragman Rolls of 1296 swearing fealty to Edward I of England.

=== Wars of Scottish Independence ===
Sir Malcolm de Drummond (aft. 1209–1278) also swore fealty to Edward I of England; however, despite this, during the Wars of Scottish Independence the Clan Drummond strongly supported the cause of Scottish Independence. Sir Malcolm Drummond fought at the Battle of Bannockburn in 1314. He is credited with the deployment of caltrops, tetrahedral iron spikes which when thrown onto the ground land with one spike uppermost to injure horses and unseat cavalry; they were highly destructive against the English cavalry. After the battle the clan was given lands in Perthshire by Robert the Bruce.

The Clan Drummond gained more land in 1345 when the latter's grandson chief Sir John Drummond married an heiress of the Montfichets and became Sir John Drummond of Stobhall. Sir John's sister Margaret Drummond married David II of Scotland but they had no children. In 1367, Sir John's daughter Anabella Drummond married John Stewart, Earl of Carrick, the future High Steward of Scotland then King as Robert III of Scotland, and became the mother of King James I of Scotland in 1394.

=== 15th century and clan conflicts ===
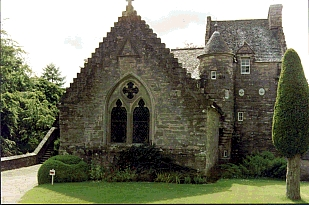
Stobhall Castle and its chapel

Sir Malcolm, the eldest great-grandson of the aforementioned Sir Malcolm, obtained the clan home, Stobhall Castle, from his aunt Queen Margaret Drummond, David II of Scotland's wife.

Chief Sir Malcolm Drummond married Isabel Douglas the Countess of Mar. He obtained the lands of Stobhall from his aunt Queen Margaret, who had first obtained it from King David II of Scotland. Sir Malcolm was murdered in 1403 by a band of Highland marauders, said to have been the Clan Stewart of Appin led by Alexander Stewart, the son of the Wolf of Badenoch.

Malcolm was succeeded by his brother Sir John Drummond, who married Lady Elizabeth Sinclair, daughter of Henry Sinclair, 1st Earl of Orkney, and wife Jean Haliburton. They were survived by a number of children including their eldest son and heir, Sir Walter Drummond. According to traditional accounts, their son John, whom is believed to have left Scotland for France, settled in Madeira Island, where he was known as João Escórcio. He married Branca Afonso, had issue, and, if believed, claimed to be John Drummond on his deathbed. His descendants, mainly the ones of the female lines, sought to establish the true origin of the name, finding out that João Escórcio was a second son of the House of Drummond of Stobhall. He was later declared a son of Sir John Drummond of Stobhall and Cargill and Lady Elizabeth Sinclair in a letter issued in the name of the Chief of the Clan Drummond, Lord David Drummond, in 1519. While plausible, the traditional narrative is reliant on secondary sources, citing supposed primary sources, and should be treated with some caution. However, following the letter of 1519, the descendants of Escórcio petitioned for Portuguese grants of Lord Drummond's armorial bearings (which they were subsequently awarded), and corresponded with successive generations of the Chiefs of Clan Drummond, and their kinsmen in Scotland. In 1519, and even afterwards, in 1604 and 1634, some descendants of João Escórcio established correspondence with the members of the Drummond family of Stobhall, exchanging letters, some written in Latin. They are published in the book "The Genealogy of the most noble and ancient house of Drummond", given to print in Edinburgh in 1831. The "Historical Archive of Madeira" translated and published them in its Volume III. In those letters to the Portuguese relatives, the Scottish noblemen confirmed that a son of Lord Drummond, who was brother of Queen Annabella of Scotland, went by 1420 to France in search for honour and fame, his brothers and sisters not having any more news of him; from thus the persuasion that he would be the same that, by around that time, docked in Madeira and made himself call João Escórcio, surname taken from Scotland. The Escórcio or Escócio and Drummond surnames survive in Madeira, Azores (in this case, Drummond and variations such as Drumond, Durmond, Durmão, Dramonde, De Ormonde, Ormond, and Armond), and former colonies (such as Brazil). At the death of the 6th Earl of Perth, the last representative of his line, in 1878, many people from Madeira, Azores and Brazil intended to qualify for the inheritance, but they were unable to do so due to the lack of authentic documents. The arms of this family in Portugal are as follow: or, three waved fesses gules; crest: a greyhound gules, collared or, outgoing.

Sir John Drummond, who married Elizabeth Sinclair's great-grandson, and heir, also called John, was Justiciar of Scotia, a Privy Councillor, constable of Stirling Castle, and became a Lord of Parliament on 29 January 1487 as the first Lord Drummond. One year of his life was spent in confinement within Blackness Castle after he assaulted the Lord Lyon, King of Arms. He had a daughter, Margaret, said to have been secretly married to King James IV, who died after a meal, together with two of her sisters. Although some say it was murder, others claim their deaths were due to food poisoning.

The Battle of Knockmary was fought in 1490 by Clan Murray against the Clan Drummond and Clan Campbell, which had been engaged in a long feud. David Drummond was later executed for burning of a group of Murrays in a church.

=== 16th century and clan conflicts ===
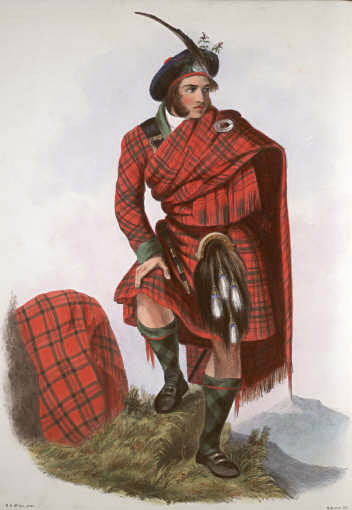
A romanticised Victorian-era illustration of a Drummond clansman by R. R. McIan from The Clans of the Scottish Highlands published in 1845

In 1589, Patrick, 3rd Lord Drummond, appointed his deputy kinsmen, John Drummond of Drummond-Ernoch, Royal Forester of Glenartney. It was in this post that he cut off the ears of some of the Clan MacGregor whom he had caught poaching. In revenge a party of MacGregors, aided by their cohorts the Macdonalds, attacked Drummond and cut off his head. They then proceeded to John's sister Margaret's residence, Ardvorlich Castle on the banks of Loch Earn. Her husband Alexander Stewart, the Laird of Ardvorlich, was away from home at the time the McGregors and the Macdonalds burst in, demanding bread and cheese. The MacGregors unwrapped John's bloodied head and crammed its mouth full, placing it on a platter in the middle of the dinner table for their hostess to find when she returned with food and drink for them. On seeing her beloved brother's severed head, Margaret, who was in advanced pregnancy, almost lost her reason. She fled into the woods beneath Ben Vorlich and gave birth to her son James Stewart. He grew up to be the notable Major James Stewart of the Covenanting Wars, of whom Sir Walter Scott wrote in the book, A Legend of Montrose, telling of his exploits. He vowed vengeance on the McGregors and played a major role in having the Clan proscribed.

=== 17th century and civil war ===
In 1610 James Drummond, 1st Lord Madderty built Innerpeffray Castle.

James Drummond, descendant of John, Margaret's father, became the first Earl of Perth in 1605,. His brother John became his successor on his death in 1611, and his sons became Earls of Perth like their father before them. Lord Drummond led his forces in support of the Covanenters against the Royalists at the Battle of Tippermuir in 1644. The chief of Clan Drummond, third Earl of Perth joined James Graham, 1st Marquis of Montrose in August 1645 and was taken prisoner at the Battle of Philiphaugh the following month.

In about 1660 the grandson of James Drummond 1st Lord Madderty established a library in St Mary's chapel, the burial place of Drummonds. Later in 1751 on the same site, Robert Hay Drummond opened Scotland's first public lending library.

During the battles that followed in the decades after the Civil War the Clan Drummond fought at the Battle of Killiecrankie in 1689.

=== 18th century and Jacobite risings ===
==== Jacobite rising of 1715 ====
When James VII came to the throne in 1685, James Drummond, 4th Earl of Perth (later 1st Duke of Perth), had converted to the Catholic Faith, as did his brother, the 1st Earl of Melfort. Therefore, during the Jacobite risings, the Clan Drummond were largely supporters of the Jacobite cause and the House of Stuart. Chief James Drummond, 2nd Duke of Perth joined the Jacobites during the Jacobite rising of 1715 and fought at the Battle of Sheriffmuir. He later fled in exile to France, and his estates were forfeited.

==== Jacobite rising of 1745 ====
James Drummond, 3rd Duke of Perth was born in France but returned to Scotland in 1734 to live at Drummond Castle with his mother. He was one of Charles Edward Stuart's closest commanders and he was involved in the Siege of Carlisle during the Jacobite rising of 1745. Clan Drummond fought as Jacobites at the battles of Falkirk (1746) and Culloden (1746). At the Battle of Culloden James Drummond, 3rd Duke of Perth was shot and later died of his wounds, he was buried at sea from a boat which was escaping to France. His brother, Lord John Drummond, went into exile in France. While their cousin, William Drummond, 4th Viscount Strathallan, was killed during the battle.

For their support of the Jacobite Stewarts through the risings of 1715 and 1745 the property and titles of the Drummonds were twice forfeited. It was not until 1853, through an Act of Parliament, that the title of Earl of Perth and other forfeited titles were restored to George Drummond, who was also in the French peerage as a Baron.

Adam Drummond was captured commanding Drummond's Edinburgh Volunteers Regiment that fought on the side of the British government at the Battle of Prestonpans in 1745.

=== 20th century ===
James Eric Drummond (1876–1951), 16th Earl of Perth, served as the first secretary-general of the League of Nations. Lord Perth, a Catholic, was also British ambassador to Rome, from 1933 to 1939, and was chief advisor on foreign publicity at the Ministry of Information during World War II.

His successor, John David Drummond, was able to buy back the family home, Stobhall Castle, which had recently part of its furniture auctioned by his son and heir, after which he moved to London.

== Clan castles ==
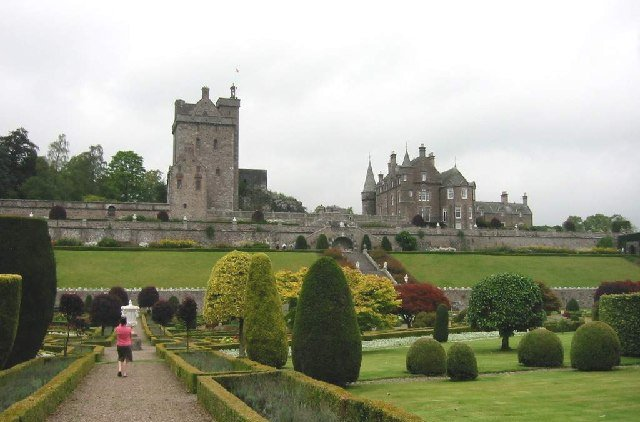
Drummond Castle, historic seat of the chiefs of Clan Drummond

- Stobhall Castle, seven miles north of Perth is a 16th-century castle that is ranged around a courtyard. It is in the form of L-plan block with a conical roof and it houses a chapel dating from the fourteenth century that has a painted ceiling from 1630 to 1640. The castle was held by the Drummonds from 1360 and it was the main stronghold of the Drummonds until they moved to Drummond Castle in the fifteenth century. Stobhall Castle is now once again the seat of the chiefs of Clan Drummond.
- Drummond Castle, about a mile south-west of Crieff, in Perthshire stands on a rocky outcrop and dates from the fifteenth century. The castle includes a five-storey tower as well as later and lower extensions. Sir Malcolm Drummond distinguished himself at the Battle of Bannockburn in 1314 and was given lands there that were originally known as Concraig. However, the castle was begun by John Drummond, 1st Lord Drummond in the fifteenth century. In the 1650s the castle was badly damaged by Oliver Cromwell, after James Drummond, 3rd Earl of Perth had been active with James Graham, 1st Marquess of Montrose, and James Drummond was captured after the Battle of Philiphaugh in 1645. The castle was slighted by government troops who occupied it during the Jacobite rising of 1715. The Drummonds were forfeited for taking part in the Jacobite rising of 1745 but they recovered the Earldom of Perth in 1822, and the Drummond Earls of Perth now live at Stobhall Castle.
- Newton Castle, slightly north-west of Blairgowrie in Perthshire dates from the sixteenth century but was built on the site of an older stronghold. The castle is a Z-plan tower house and was held by the Drummonds who feuded with the nearby Blairs of Ardblair. It was sacked in 1644 by James Graham, 1st Marquess of Montrose and was torched by Oliver Cromwell in 1650; however, the defenders are said to have survived in the vaults while the castle burned around them. George Drummond, who was Lord Provost of Edinburgh came from the Drummond of Newton family and was responsible for the first building of New Town, Edinburgh.
- Balmoral Castle was held by the Drummonds in 1390 but later passed to the Gordons and others. In 1852 it was purchased by Prince Albert, husband of Queen Victoria.
- Megginch Castle was home of Cherry Drummond, 16th Baroness Strange

== Clan chief ==
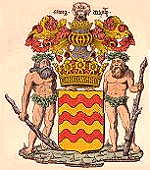
Coat of Arms of the Earl of Perth

- Clan chief: James David Drummond, the 10th Earl of Perth, Lord Drummond, Lord Maderty and Lord Drummond of Cromlix, and Chief of the Name and Arms of Drummond, also Hereditary Steward of Strathearn, and de jure 19th Earl and 16th titular (Jacobite peerage) Duke of Perth
  - Heir presumptive: Hon. Robert Eric Drummond

== Notes ==
- Burke, 1712.
- Barrett, Michael, Footprints of the Ancient Scottish Church, 1914.
- Barrett, Michael, Footprints of the Ancient Scottish Church, 1914.
