= Drummond Business Block =

- U.S. National Register of Historic Places
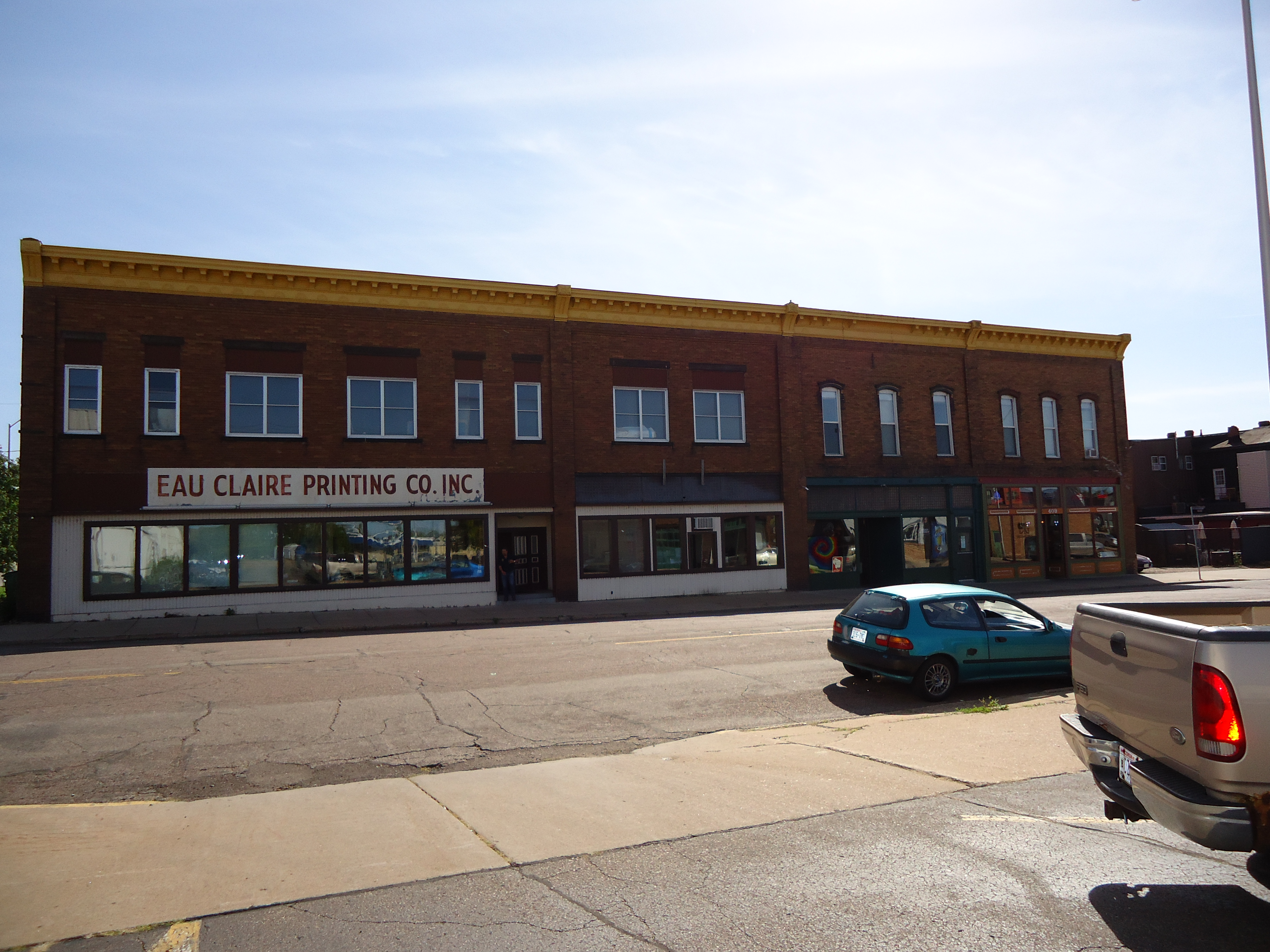
- Location: 409-417 Galloway St. Eau Claire, Wisconsin
- Built: 1879-1884
- NRHP reference No.: 07001084
- Added to NRHP: October 10, 2007

The Drummond Business Block is located in Eau Claire, Wisconsin. It was added to the National Register of Historic Places in 2007.

== History ==
The building was constructed in three phases from 1879 to 1884. It had been built by Canadian immigrant David Drummond for his meat packing business. The building serves in a mixture of manufacturing, specialty and residential capacities.
