= Drummond Street =

Drummond Street may refer to:

- Drummond Street, Edinburgh, a street in the Old Town of Edinburgh, United Kingdom
- Drummond Street, London, a street in Camden, London, United Kingdom
- Drummond Street, Montreal, a street in downtown Montreal, Canada
- Drummond Street, Melbourne, a street in the inner suburb of Carlton in Melbourne, Australia
