= ARA Drummond =

At least two ships of the Argentine Navy have been named Drummond:

- ARA Drummond (M-2), a Bouchard-class minesweeper commissioned in 1937 and decommissioned in 1964.
- ARA Drummond (P-31), a Drummond-class corvette ordered from a French shipyard by South Africa she was launched in 1977 as SAS Good Hope but never delivered. She was purchased by Argentina and renamed in 1978.
