= Drummonds =

Drummonds may refer to:

- Drummonds Bank, an English private banking house
- Drummonds (TV series), a British television drama series produced for London Weekend Television
