= Drummond Tobacco Company =

- Private
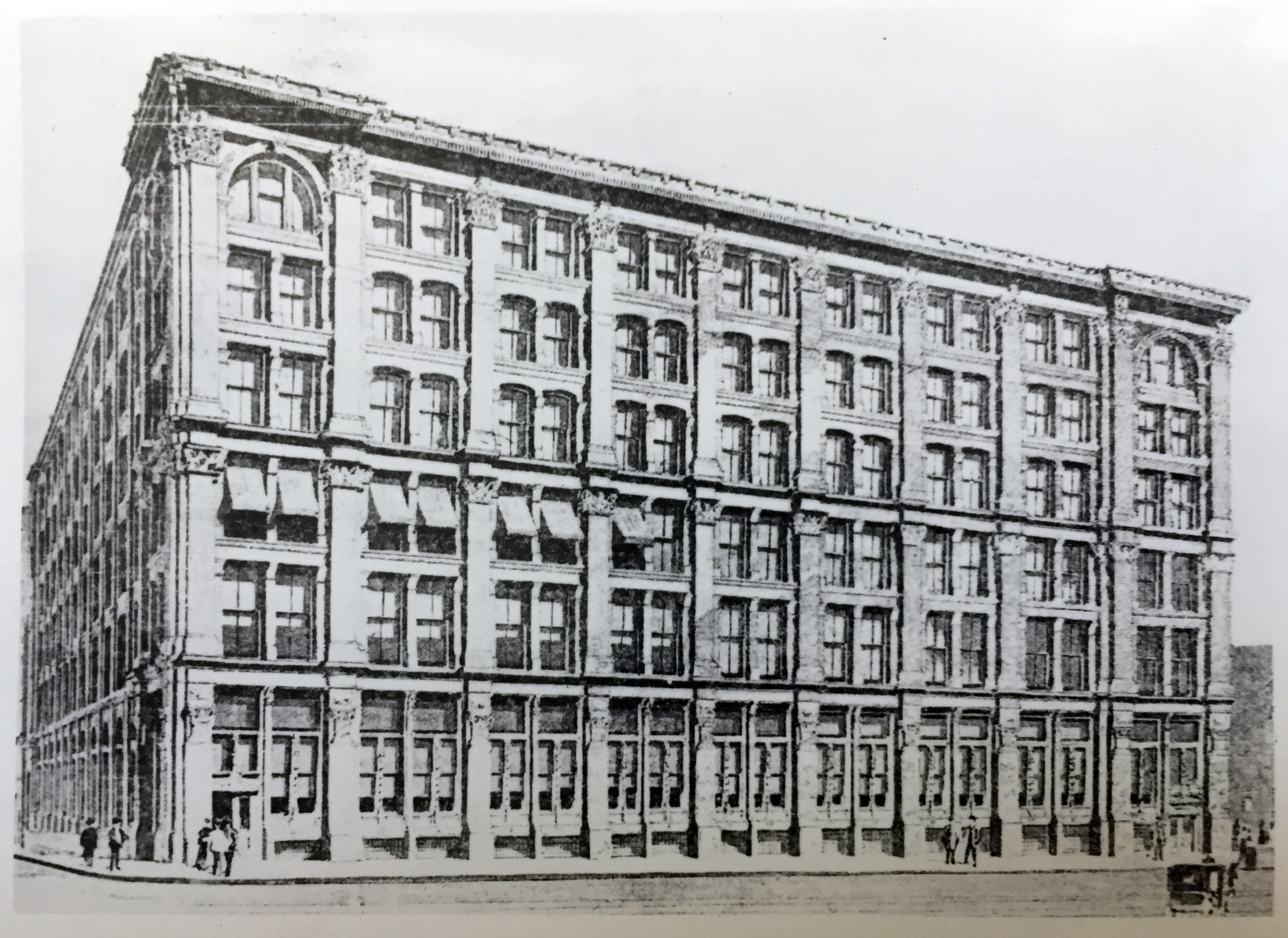
- Drummond Tobacco Company Building in St. Louis, Missouri
- Founded: 1873
- Defunct: 1898
- Headquarters: St. Louis, Missouri, United States

The Drummond Tobacco Company was an American tobacco company in St. Louis, Missouri.

== History ==
The company was founded in 1873, when it started making Chesterfield cigarettes. Its headquarters in St. Louis was designed by architect Isaac S. Taylor in 1885. The company later also produced Horseshoe brand chewing tobacco. It was acquired by the American Tobacco Company in 1898.
