= Drummond (given name) =

Drummond is a masculine given name. Notable people with the name include:

- Drummond Allison (1921–1943), English war poet of the Second World War
- Drummond Bone (born 1947), British scholar and current Master of Balliol College, Oxford
- Drummond Brown (1885–1927), Major League Baseball catcher
- Drummond Erskine (1919–2009), American character actor
- Drummond Ford (1907–1942), Scottish international rugby union player
- Drummond Matthews (1931–1997), British marine geologist and geophysicist
- Drummond Money-Coutts (born 1986), English magician
- Drummond Shiels (1881–1953), Scottish Labour politician
