= Drummond Castle =

Castle in Perth and Kinross, Scotland

Coordinates: 56°20′26.78″N 3°52′10.23″W

Designations

Inventory of Gardens and Designed Landscapes in Scotland
- Official name: Drummond Castle
- Designated: 1 July 1987
- Reference no.: GDL00144

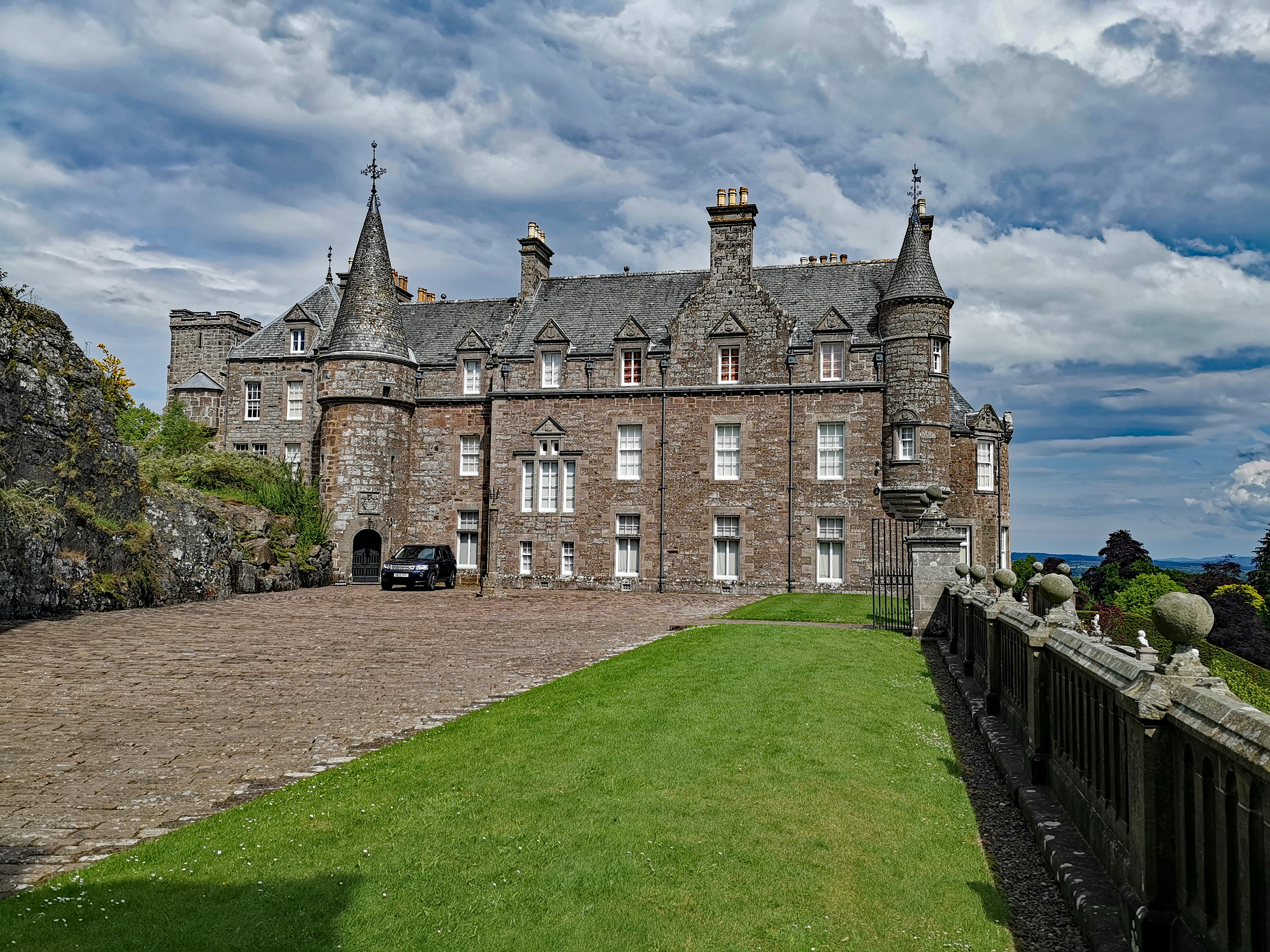
Drummond Castle front view

Drummond Castle is located in Perthshire, Scotland. The castle is known for its gardens, described by Historic Environment Scotland as "the best example of formal terraced gardens in Scotland". It is situated in Muthill parish, 4 kilometres (2.5 mi) south of Crieff. The castle comprises a tower house built in the late 15th century, and a 17th-century mansion, both of which were rebuilt in Victorian times. The gardens date to the 1630s, although they too were restructured in the 19th century. The formal gardens are protected as a category A listed building, and are included on the Inventory of Gardens and Designed Landscapes in Scotland. The tower house and mansion are both category B listed.

== History ==
The lands of Drummond were the property of the Drummond family from the 14th century, and the original tower house was built over several years by John Drummond, 1st Lord Drummond of Cargill, from about 1490. In 1605 the 4th Lord Drummond was created Earl of Perth, and added to the castle. The 2nd Earl of Perth laid out the first terraced garden around the castle in the 1630s.

The castle was sacked by the army of Oliver Cromwell in 1653, during the Wars of the Three Kingdoms. The 4th Earl of Perth was Lord Chancellor of Scotland under King James VII. He began the mansion house in 1689, before being imprisoned following the deposition of King James by William of Orange. He later fled to the exiled Jacobite court in France. The Drummonds continued to support the Jacobite cause in the Jacobite uprisings of 1715 and 1745. The family retained control of the estate until 1750, when the Drummond properties were declared forfeit and seized by the Crown. The estate was managed by the Commissioners for Forfeited Estates until 1784, when it was sold to Captain James Drummond (later created 1st Baron Perth). He began a number of improvements that were continued by his daughter Sarah and her husband, the 22nd Baron Willoughby de Eresby (1782–1865). These included the formal gardens and terraces in the 1830s. Queen Victoria visited the gardens in 1842.

Drummond Castle passed to the 24th Baroness Willoughby de Eresby (1809–1888), and then to her son, the 1st Earl of Ancaster (1830–1910). The upper stories of the tower house were rebuilt and heightened in pseudo-medieval style in 1842–53. The mansion was renovated in 1878, to designs by George Turnbull Ewing. The 3rd Earl of Ancaster and his wife, Nancy Astor (1909–1975; she was the daughter of the 2nd Viscount Astor and Viscountess Astor), replanted the gardens in the 1950s. The castle is now the seat of the 28th Baroness Willoughby de Eresby, the daughter and heiress of the 3rd Earl of Ancaster. As of early 2021, she was still the owner of the estate. The castle (not open to visitors) and the gardens are managed by the Grimsthorpe and Drummond Castle Trust.

== Description ==
The castle is set on part of a prominent spine of hard rock that stretches several kilometres across Perthshire, but is particularly prominent and steep-sided at the site of the castle. The eastern access road to the castle follows the ridge as it rises steadily westwards to the castle.

The ridge here is a dyke of tholeiitic basalt, part of the late Carboniferous (c.300Ma) dyke swarm and has been intruded into earlier Devonian sedimentary rocks of the Teith Sandstone Formation (c.400 Ma). The dyke can be traced east to Perth and West to Glen Artney where it terminates within the Highland Boundary Fault complex. A similar dyke runs parallel to it at Bennybeg about half a mile to the north. Several miles to the east, the ridge was used as part of a line of Roman fortlets and signal towers known as the Gask Ridge.

The tower house, or keep, is no longer used as a dwelling. It is adjoined by a later, but better preserved, gatehouse (built 1629–30). Stretching between the tower house and the edge of the ridge, it was originally intended to control access to the courtyard behind, which has a fine view over the formal gardens. To the south of the castle on its rocky outcrop are the formal gardens.

The buildings and gardens of Drummond Castle featured as backdrops in the 1995 film Rob Roy.

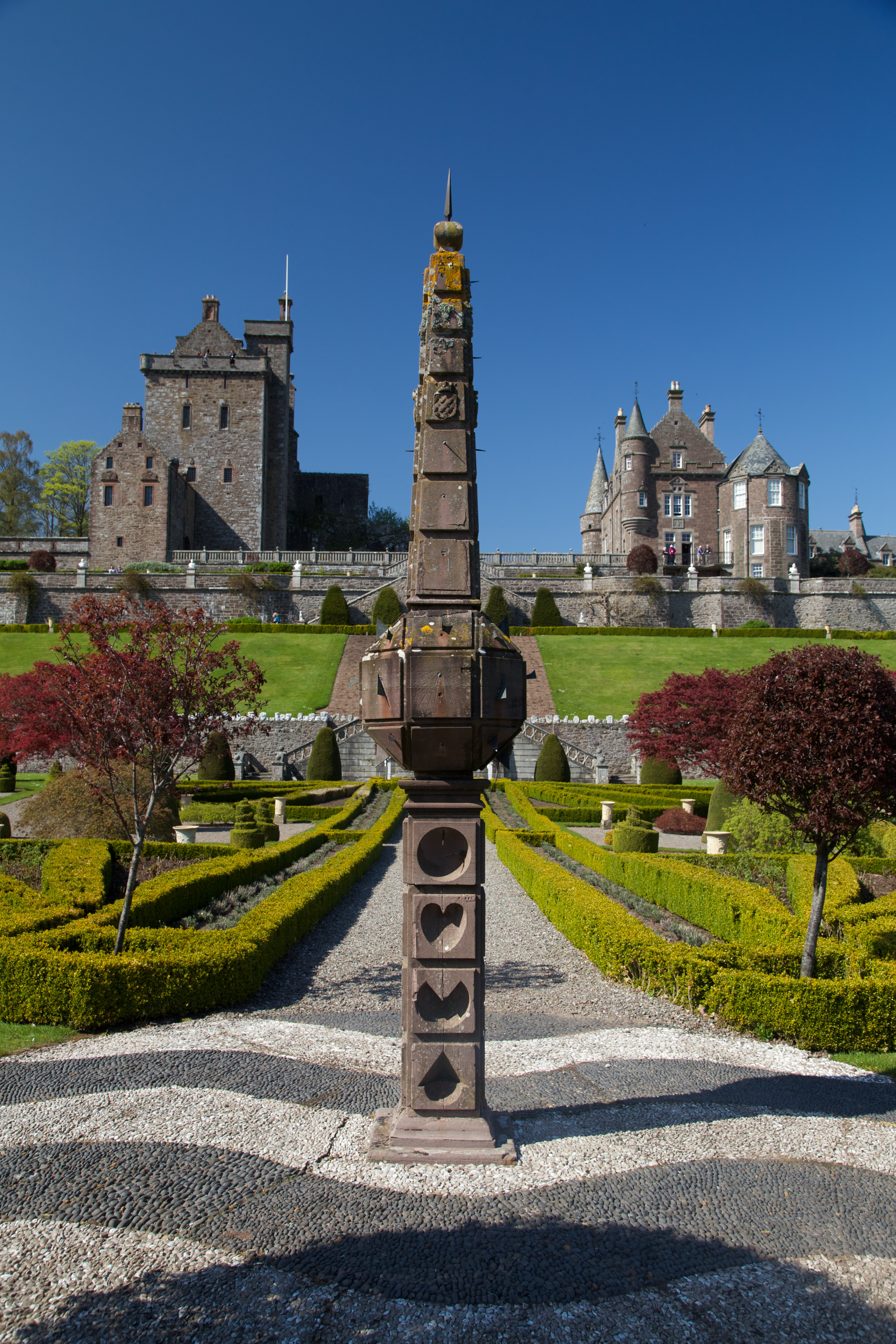
View of sundial with castle in background

== Gardens ==
There may have been gardens in this location since the late 1400s, and a major transformation is thought to have been completed (of both gardens and castle) between 1630 and 1636. The current layout was started in the 1830s, based on a design by Lewis Kennedy, after Clementina Drummond and her husband Peter Robert Willoughby inherited the estate from her father. According to VisitScotland, "Drummond Gardens are some of Scotland's most important formal gardens and are among the finest in Europe". There are paperbark maple trees and flowering Cercidiphyllum japonicum trees.

Queen Victoria and Prince Albert visited the garden in 1842.

Originally encompassing twelve acres, the garden was downsized after the Second World War. The parterre exhibits the Drummond family coat of arms: "Scots thistles and daggers, and its traversing paths create a saltire, centering on a recently restored stone sundial dating from 1630". In the TV series Outlander, the gardens were used to represent the formal garden at the Palace of Versailles as it might have appeared in the time of Louis XV.

The agency's website adds that the gardens were "redesigned and terraced in the 19th century: the gardens you see today were replanted in the 1950s".

Because of the worldwide COVID-19 pandemic, the gardens did not open to the public as they have in other years during Easter and between May and October.

In 2024, the castle gardens hosted Dior's The Cruise 2025 collection, which was presented by creative director Maria Grazia Chiuri. This was Dior's first catwalk show in Scotland in almost 70 years.

== Gallery ==
Drummond castle and gardens
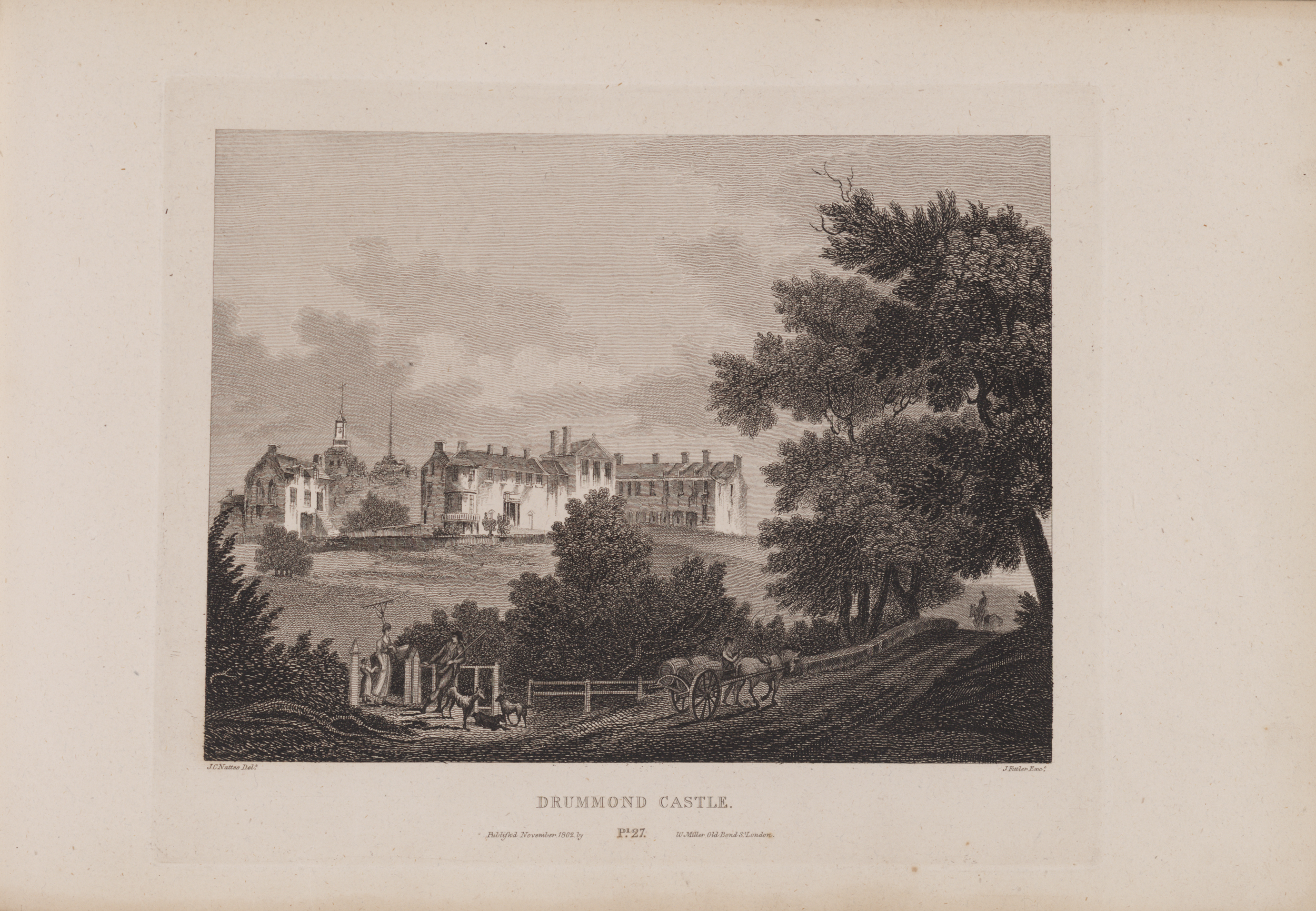
Etching of Drummond Castle from James Fittler's Scotia Depicta, published 1804

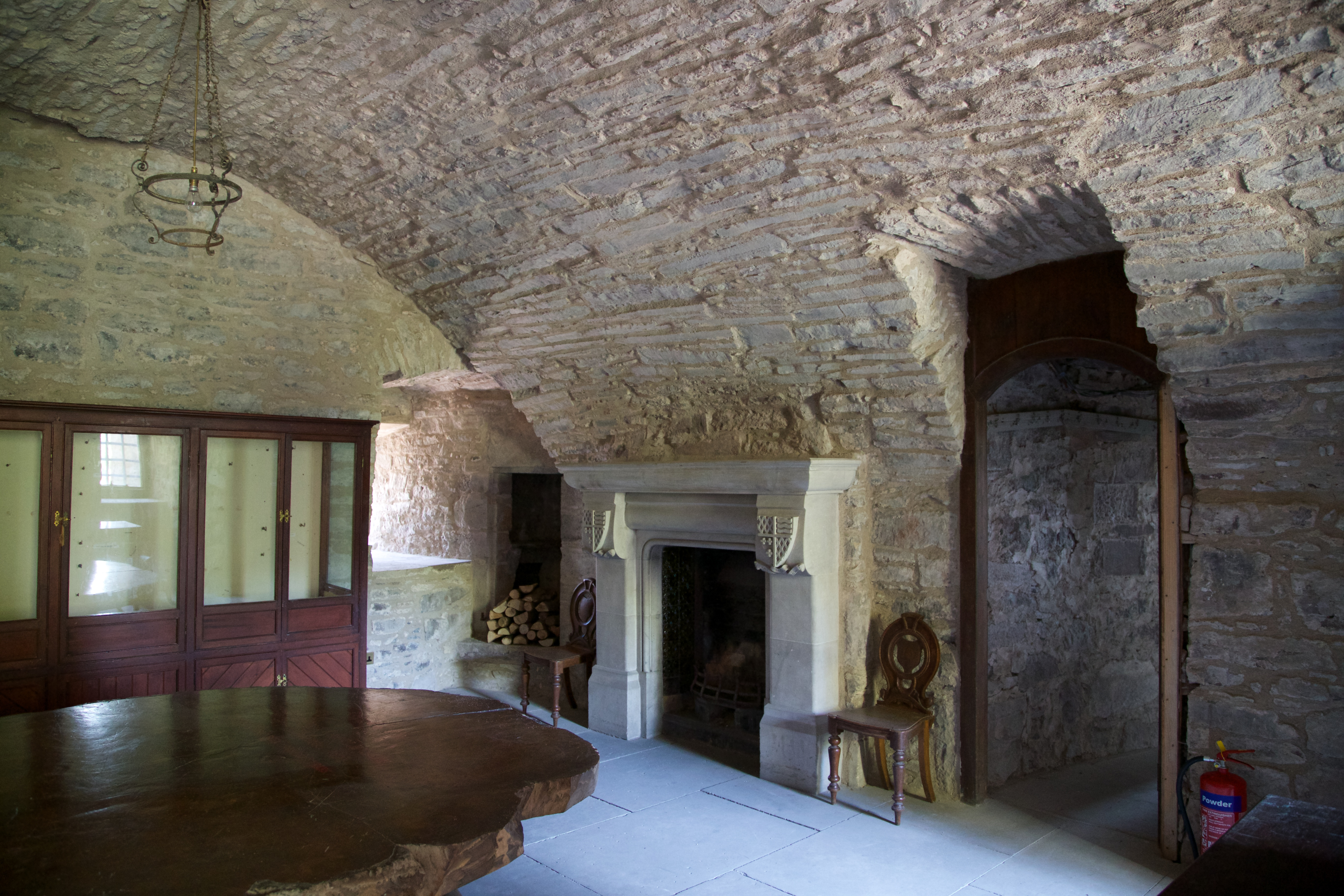
Interior

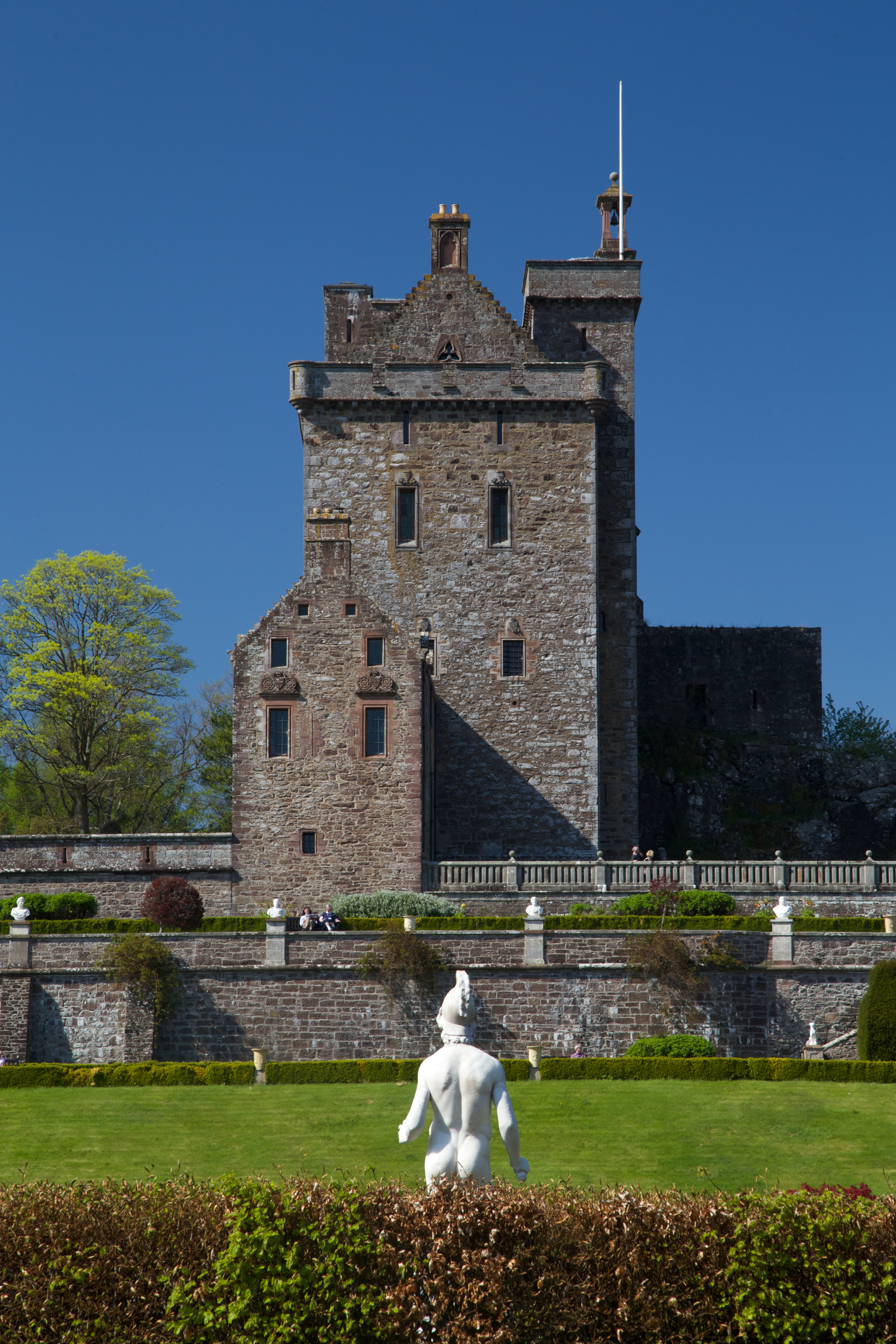
The Keep

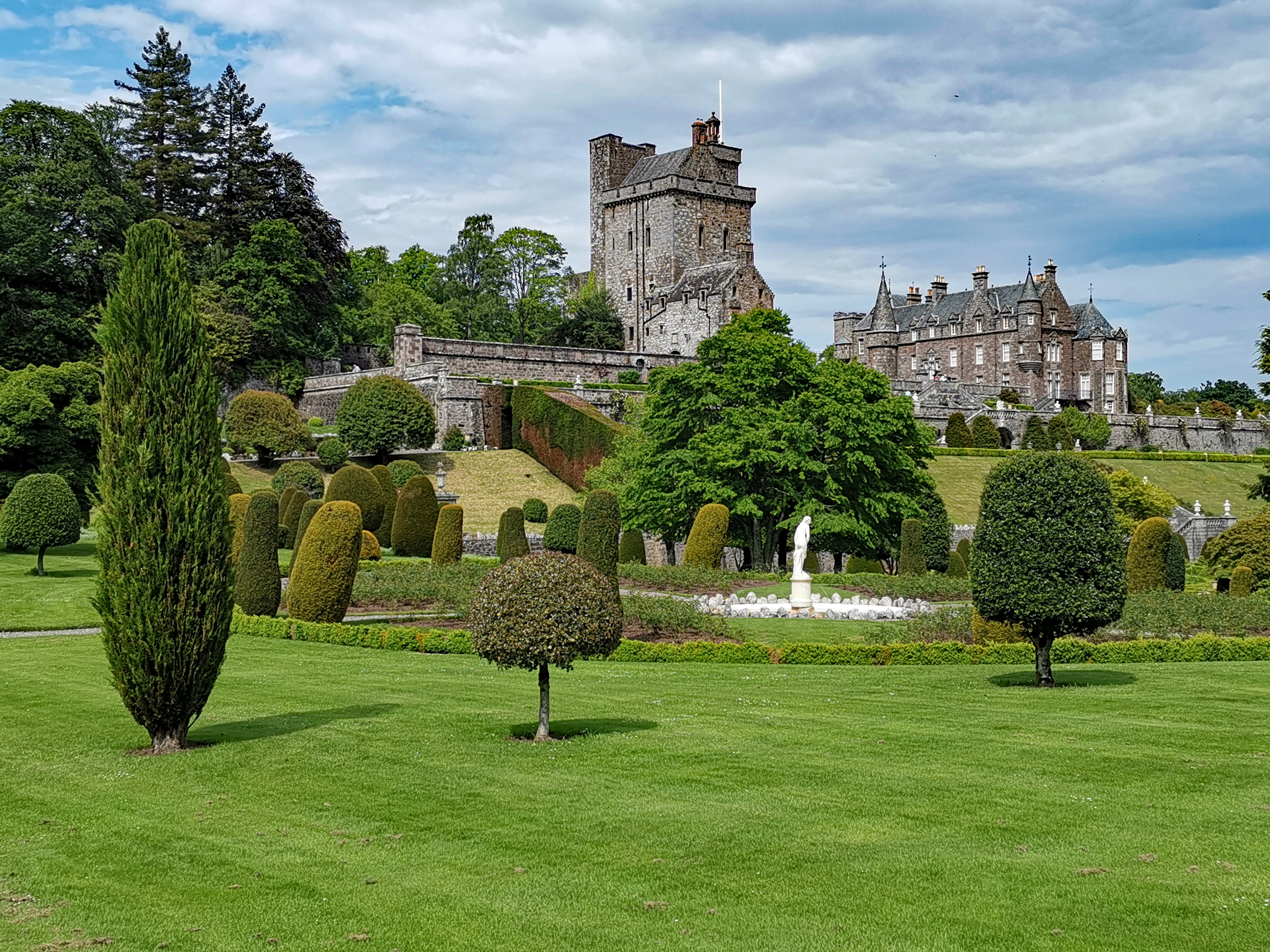
View from the Baroque garden

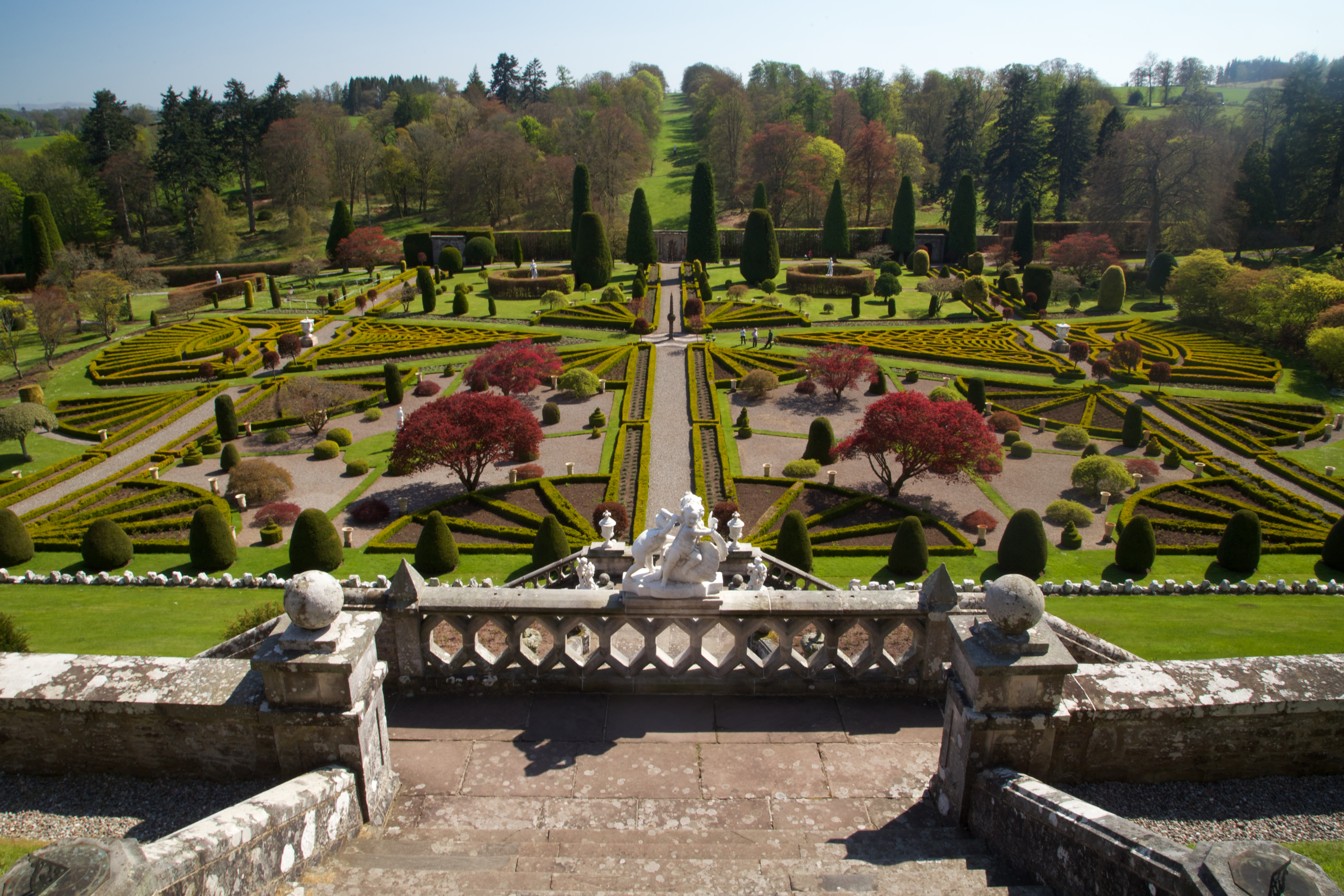
Drummond Castle's Baroque garden
