= Stobhall =

Location in Perthshire in Scotland

Designations

Inventory of Gardens and Designed Landscapes in Scotland
- Official name: Stobhall
- Designated: 1 July 1987
- Reference no.: GDL00348

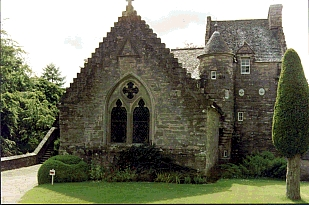
Stobhall Castle in 1999, looking north

Stobhall (or Stobhall Castle) is a country house and estate in Perthshire in Scotland, 8 miles (13 km) from Perth. The 17th-century dower house and several other buildings are Category A-listed with Historic Environment Scotland.

The lands at Stobhall have been in the hands of the Drummond family, the Earls of Perth, since the 14th century. Stobhall Castle was the ancestral seat of the Drummonds, a stronghold of Roman Catholicism in Scotland after the English Reformation, the Drummonds being staunch Roman Catholic recusants. It is one of two castles (the other is Drummond Castle) traditionally associated with the family.

James IV of Scotland came to Stobhall on 6 February 1498 and was entertained by a lute player.

In 2012, a number of items from the house were auctioned at Bonhams in Edinburgh, raising over £900,000; the current earl James David Drummond, 19th Earl of Perth, and paternal grandson of the 17th Earl, decided to move to London.
