= David Drummond, 8th Earl of Perth =

Scottish peer (1907–2002)

The Right Honourable The Earl of Perth PC FSA Scot
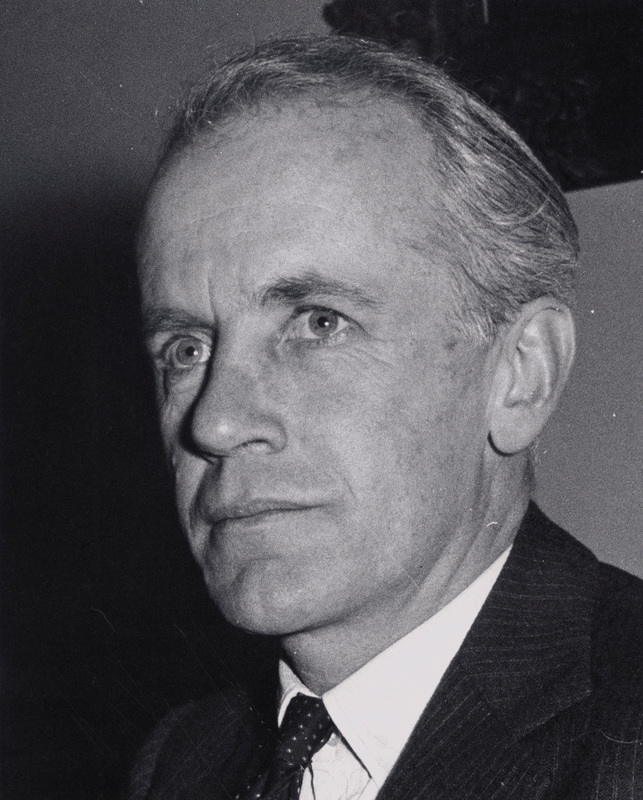
- Born: John David Drummond; 13 May 1907; London, England
- Died: 25 November 2002 (aged 95); Cargill, Perthshire, Scotland
- Education: Downside School
- Alma mater: Trinity College, Cambridge
- Spouse: Nancy Fincke (m. 1934; died 1996)
- Children: 2
- Parents: Eric Drummond, 7th Earl of Perth (father); Hon. Angela Mary Constable-Maxwell (mother)
- Relatives: Marmaduke Constable-Maxwell (maternal grandfather); Gwendolen Fitzalan-Howard (aunt); John Eric Drummond (son)

John David Drummond, 8th Earl of Perth, PC, FSA Scot (13 May 1907 – 25 November 2002), styled Viscount Strathallan from 1937 to 1951, was a Scottish peer, banker and politician. Because of the complicated history of the earldom of Perth (attainder 1715, reversed 1853), he was sometimes deemed informally to be the 17th Earl of Perth.

He was Minister of State for Colonial Affairs from 1957 to 1962.

== Background and education ==
Drummond was born in London, the son of Eric Drummond, 7th Earl of Perth, and the Hon. Angela Mary Constable-Maxwell, a daughter of Marmaduke Constable-Maxwell, 11th Lord Herries of Terregles.

A Roman Catholic, he was educated at Downside School and Trinity College, Cambridge. As his parents travelled for his father's work, David Drummond spent much of his childhood with his maternal aunt, the Duchess of Norfolk.

== Career ==
After beginning a banking career, during the Second World War the young Drummond went to Paris to help Noël Coward in a propaganda office, then returned to London to work in the War Cabinet office and later at the Ministry of Production, having been recruited by Anthony Eden. In 1945, after the war, he joined Schroders and was a partner until 1956.

On his father's death in December 1951, he succeeded him as Earl of Perth and was a Scottish representative peer from 1952 to 1963. In 1957, despite not being a member of the Conservative party, was appointed Minister of State for Colonial Affairs in Harold Macmillan's government, a post he held until 1962. He was appointed a Privy Counsellor in 1957. Perth was also First Crown Estate Commissioner from 1962 to 1977, Chairman of the Ditchley Foundation from 1963 to 1966 and Chairman of the Reviewing Committee on the Export of Works of Art from 1972 to 1976.

He was a champion of Scottish arts and heritage, serving as a trustee of the National Museums of Scotland and the National Library of Scotland, and a fellow of the Society of Antiquaries.

== Personal life ==
In 1934 Perth married Nancy Fincke, an American, in New York City. They lived at Stobhall, near Stanley in Tayside and had two sons. Lady Perth died in 1996, and Lord Perth died in Cargill, Perthshire, on 25 November 2002, aged 95. He was succeeded by his elder son, John Eric Drummond, 9th Earl of Perth, who died in March 2023, aged 87.

Political offices
Preceded by John Maclay	Minister of State for the Colonies; 1957–1962	Succeeded by The Marquess of Lansdowne
Peerage of Scotland
Preceded by Eric Drummond	Earl of Perth; 1951–2002	Succeeded by John Eric Drummond
