= Earl of Perth =

Scottish peerage title

Earldom of Perth
- Or, three bars wavy Gules
- Creation date: 4 March 1605
- Created by: King James VI
- Peerage: Peerage of Scotland
- First holder: James, 4th Lord Drummond
- Present holder: James Drummond, 10th Earl of Perth
- Heir presumptive: The Hon. Robert Drummond
- Remainder to: heirs male whatsoever
- Subsidiary titles: Viscount Strathallan; Lord Drummond; Lord Maderty; Thane of Lennox; Steward of Menteith and Strathearn; Chief of the Name and Arms of Drummond
- Seat: Stobhall

Earl of Perth is a title in the Peerage of Scotland. It was created in 1605 for James Drummond, 4th Lord Drummond. The Drummond family claim descent from Maurice, son of George, a younger son of King Andrew I of Hungary. Maurice arrived in Scotland on the ship which brought Edgar Ætheling, the Saxon claimant to the crown of England after the Norman Conquest, and his sister Margaret to Scotland in 1068. Maurice was given lands in Lennox (Dunbartonshire), together with the hereditary stewardship of the county. The Hungarian Prince theory has been discounted as no evidence of any relationships exists in written records or DNA. "The Red Book of the Menteiths" clearly discounts the Hungarian Prince as a myth likely formed to give status to the Drummond origins. The Drummonds in the 12th century were allied to the Menteiths – their early fortunes developed through the relationship. Indeed, one "Johannes De Drumon", said to have died in 1301, was buried in Inchmahome Priory which was founded by the Menteiths. His successor John Drummond, the 7th Steward, was deprived of the lands and retired into Perthshire.

John Drummond, Justiciar of Scotia, was created a Lord of Parliament as Lord Drummond of Cargill in 1487–8 by King James III of Scotland. His direct descendant, James, 4th Lord Drummond, Ambassador to Spain, was created Earl of Perth and Lord Drummond of Stobhall in 1605.

James Drummond, 4th Earl of Perth, was attainted for supporting the Jacobites during the rising of 1715. He had been created Duke of Perth, Marquess of Drummond, Earl of Stobhall, Viscount Cargill, and Lord Concraig in 1701 by the exiled Jacobite claimant to the British thrones, recognised by adherents of the Royal Stuarts as King James III and VIII. This creation, in the Jacobite Peerage, was never recognised by the de facto British government. He and his successors nonetheless continued to claim the Earldom together with the Dukedom. Upon the death of the sixth Duke in 1760, he was succeeded by a second cousin, descended from the younger brother of the 4th Earl and 1st Jacobite Duke, John Drummond, first Earl and Jacobite Duke of Melfort, by his first wife. He, in turn, was succeeded by his third but only surviving son, as the 8th (Jacobite) Duke and 11th de jure Earl, who obtained in 1783 the restoration of the estates, forfeited as a result of the Jacobite rising of 1745. He did not succeed, however, in removing the attainder of 1716, but was created by George III of the Hanoverian dynasty, in 1797, Lord Perth, Baron Drummond of Stobhall, in the Peerage of Great Britain, which title became extinct on his death in 1800. He was succeeded, as 9th Jacobite Duke of Perth by his cousin, James Lewis Drummond, fourth Duke of Melfort, another holder of a Jacobite dukedom. The 10th Duke, who also held the Melfort titles, was a prelate of Catholic Church, known as the Abbé de Melfort. Upon his death in 1840, he was succeeded in his peerage titles by his nephew, George Drummond, who had embraced the Protestant faith.

In 1853, the sixth Duke of Melfort, George Drummond, was by Act of Parliament deemed the 5th Earl of Perth, and the previous attainder was reversed. Drummond also dropped the use of the dukedom of Melfort, although he had been recognised in French law courts as the duc de Melfort, comte de Lussan and baron de Valrose. At his death in 1902, several titles held by him, such as the Earldom of Melfort, became dormant because no-one could prove a claim to the title. The Earldom of Perth, however, as well as the titular Jacobite Dukedom, passed to William Huntly Drummond, 11th Viscount Strathallan (his 7th cousin twice removed, a descendant of the 2nd Lord Drummond). Because some writers do not count the de jure holders of the Earldom in the numbering, the 14th Earl is sometimes referred to as the 5th Earl, and so on. The present Earl of Perth considers himself the 19th holder of the title.

The subsidiary titles held by the Earl of Perth are: Viscount Strathallan (created 1686), Lord Drummond of Cargill (1488), Lord Drummond of Stobhall (1605), Lord Maderty (1609) and Lord Drummond of Cromlix (1686). The title Viscount Strathallan is the courtesy title of the Earl's eldest son and heir. All titles are in the Peerage of Scotland.

The Earl of Perth is the hereditary Clan Chief of Clan Drummond.

The family seat is at Stobhall, near Perth, from the early 14th century.

== Lords Drummond of Cargill (1488) ==
- John Drummond, 1st Lord Drummond (1438–1519)
- David Drummond, 2nd Lord Drummond (c. 1515–1571), great-grandson
- Patrick Drummond, 3rd Lord Drummond (1550–1600)
- James Drummond, 4th Lord Drummond (died 1611); became Earl of Perth in 1605

== Earls of Perth, Lords Drummond of Stobhall (1605) ==
- James Drummond, 1st Earl of Perth (died 1611)
- John Drummond, 2nd Earl of Perth (died 1662), 1st Earl's brother
- James Drummond, 3rd Earl of Perth (c. 1615–1675), 2nd Earl's elder son.
- James Drummond, 4th Earl of Perth (c. 1649–1716) (attainted), 3rd Earl's son.

== Jacobite Dukes of Perth and claimants to the Earldom of Perth (1716–1797) ==
- James Drummond, 1st Duke of Perth (c. 1649–1716) 4th Earl of Perth, created Duke of Perth in the Jacobite Peerage in 1701, non-Jacobite titles forfeited by attainder 1716
- James Drummond, 2nd Duke of Perth (died 1720), titular 5th Earl of Perth, 1st Duke's elder son
- James Drummond, 3rd Duke of Perth (died 1746), titular 6th Earl of Perth, 2nd Duke's elder son
- John Drummond, 4th Duke of Perth (died 1747), titular 7th Earl of Perth, 2nd Duke's 2nd son
- John Drummond, 5th Duke of Perth (died 1757), titular 8th Earl of Perth, 1st Duke's 2nd son
- Edward Drummond, 6th Duke of Perth (died 1760), titular 9th Earl of Perth, 1st Duke's 3rd son
- James Lundin, after 1760, Drummond, 7th Duke of Perth (1707–1781), titular 10th Earl of Perth, 1st Duke's grand-nephew by elder nephew
- James Drummond (formerly Lundin), 8th Duke of Perth (1744 – 2 July 1800), titular 11th Earl of Perth, his son, Lord Perth, Baron Drummond of Stobhall

== Lord Perth, Baron Drummond of Stobhall (1797) ==
- James Drummond (formerly Lundin) (1744 – 2 July 1800)

== Jacobite Dukes of Perth and claimants to the Earldom of Perth (1800–1853) ==
- James Louis Drummond, 4th Earl and Duke of Melfort and 9th Duke of Perth (1750 – September 1800), titular 12th Earl of Perth, 1st Duke's great-grandnephew by younger nephew.
- Charles Edouard Drummond, 5th Earl and Duke of Melfort and 10th Duke of Perth (1752–1840), titular 13th Earl of Perth, "Abbé de Melfort", his brother
- George Drummond, 6th Earl and Duke of Melfort and 11th Duke of Perth (1807–1902), his nephew, recognised by the Committee of Privilege of the House of Lords as the "5th Earl of Perth" in 1853, being the titular 14th Earl in the Jacobite peerage.

== Earls of Perth (1605, restored 1853) ==
- George Drummond, 5th Earl of Perth, Lord Drummond of Stobhall, Lord Drummond of Cargill (1807–1902) (restored 1853)
- William Huntly Drummond, 11th Viscount Strathallan and 6th Earl of Perth (1871–1937), titular (Jacobite) 12th Duke of Perth; a seventh cousin of the 5th Earl, he was a descendant of James Drummond, 1st Lord Maderty, a younger son of David Drummond, 2nd Lord Drummond (see Viscount Strathallan).
- James Eric Drummond, 7th Earl of Perth (1876–1951), titular (Jacobite) 13th Duke of Perth, 12th Viscount Strathallan, a half-brother of the 6th Earl.
- John David Drummond, 8th Earl of Perth (1907–2002), titular (Jacobite) 14th Duke of Perth, 13th Viscount Strathallan, only son of the 7th Earl.
- John Eric Drummond, 9th Earl of Perth (7 July 1935 – 27 March 2023), titular (Jacobite) 15th Duke of Perth, 14th Viscount Strathallan. The 9th Earl was the elder son of the 8th Earl and his wife Nancy Fincke, an American. He grew up at Stobhall, near Stanley, Perthshire. He was educated at Downside School, Trinity College, Cambridge, and Harvard University, where he graduated M.B.A. On 7 January 1954, the 9th Earl married Margaret Anne Gordon, a daughter of Robin Gordon, and they had four children before divorcing in 1972: Anne Lennox Drummond (born 1954), Annabella Margaret Drummond (born and died 1964), James David Drummond, Viscount Strathallan (subsequently the 10th Earl, born 1965, and Robert Eric Drummond (born 1967). In 1988, he married secondly Marion Verity Grey Elliot, née Eton.
- James David Drummond, 10th Earl of Perth.

== Present peer ==
James David Drummond, 10th Earl of Perth (born 1965) is the elder son of the 9th Earl. Previously known by the courtesy title of Viscount Strathallan, he succeeded his father in 2023 and is also the titular (Jacobite) 16th Duke of Perth and 15th Viscount Strathallan.

The heir presumptive to the peerages is the present earl's younger brother Robert Eric Drummond (born 1967). He married Lara Baumann in 2012, with whom he has a daughter, Juna Violet (born 2012), and a son, Jaego Alexander (born 2016).
