= Beauclerk =

Beauclerk or Beauclerc (pronounced boh-clair) is an English surname, from Anglo-Norman meaning "fine scholar". It is also the family name of the Duke of St Albans.

Notable people with the surname include:

- Henry I of England (c. 1068–1135), called "Beauclerc" for his scholarly interests
- Lord Amelius Beauclerk (1771–1846), Royal Navy officer
- Aubrey Beauclerk (disambiguation)
- Beatrix Beauclerk, Duchess of St Albans (1877–1953)
- Charles Beauclerk (disambiguation)
- Diana Beauclerk, Duchess of St Albans (c. 1679–1742), British courtier
- Lady Diana Beauclerk (1734–1808), English artist
- Lord Frederick Beauclerk (1773–1850), Anglican clergyman, President of Marylebone Cricket Club
- George Beauclerk (disambiguation)
- James, Lord Beauclerk (1671 - 1680 or 1681), English Noble and Child of Charles II of England
- Lord James Beauclerk (c. 1709–1787), Anglican clergyman, Bishop of Hereford
- Jane Beauclerk, pen-name of M. J. Engh (1933–2024), American science fiction author and independent Roman scholar
- Marie Bethell Beauclerc (1845–1897), English pioneer of shorthand, reporter and teacher
- Murray Beauclerk, 14th Duke of St Albans (1939–2026), FCA
- Osborne Beauclerk, 12th Duke of St Albans (1874–1964), British Army officer
- Ralph Beauclerk, Marqués de Valero de Urría (1917–2007), Captain in the British Army
- Lord Sidney Beauclerk (1703–1744), Member of Parliament and of the British Privy Council, fortune hunter
- Topham Beauclerk (1739–1780), English wit, friend of Dr Johnson and Horace Walpole
- Vere Beauclerk, 1st Baron Vere (1699–1781), Royal Navy officer and Member of Parliament
- William Beauclerk (disambiguation)
