= William Beauclerk, 8th Duke of St Albans =

English aristocrat

His Grace The Duke of St Albans
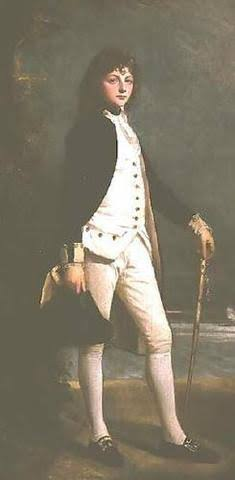
- William Beauclerk, 8th Duke of St Albans

Personal details
- Born: William Beauclerk; 18 December 1766
- Died: 17 July 1825 (aged 58)
- Spouses: Charlotte Thelwell (m. 1791; died 1797) Maria Janetta Nelthorpe (m. 1799; died 1822)
- Relations: William Beauclerk, 10th Duke of St Albans (grandson); Sir Hugh Cholmeley, 3rd Baronet (grandson); Diana de Vere Beauclerk (granddaughter)
- Children: 14, including William
- Parent(s): Aubrey Beauclerk, 5th Duke of St Albans; Lady Catharine Ponsonby

William Beauclerk, 8th Duke of St Albans (18 December 1766 – 17 July 1825) was an English aristocrat.

== Early life and career ==
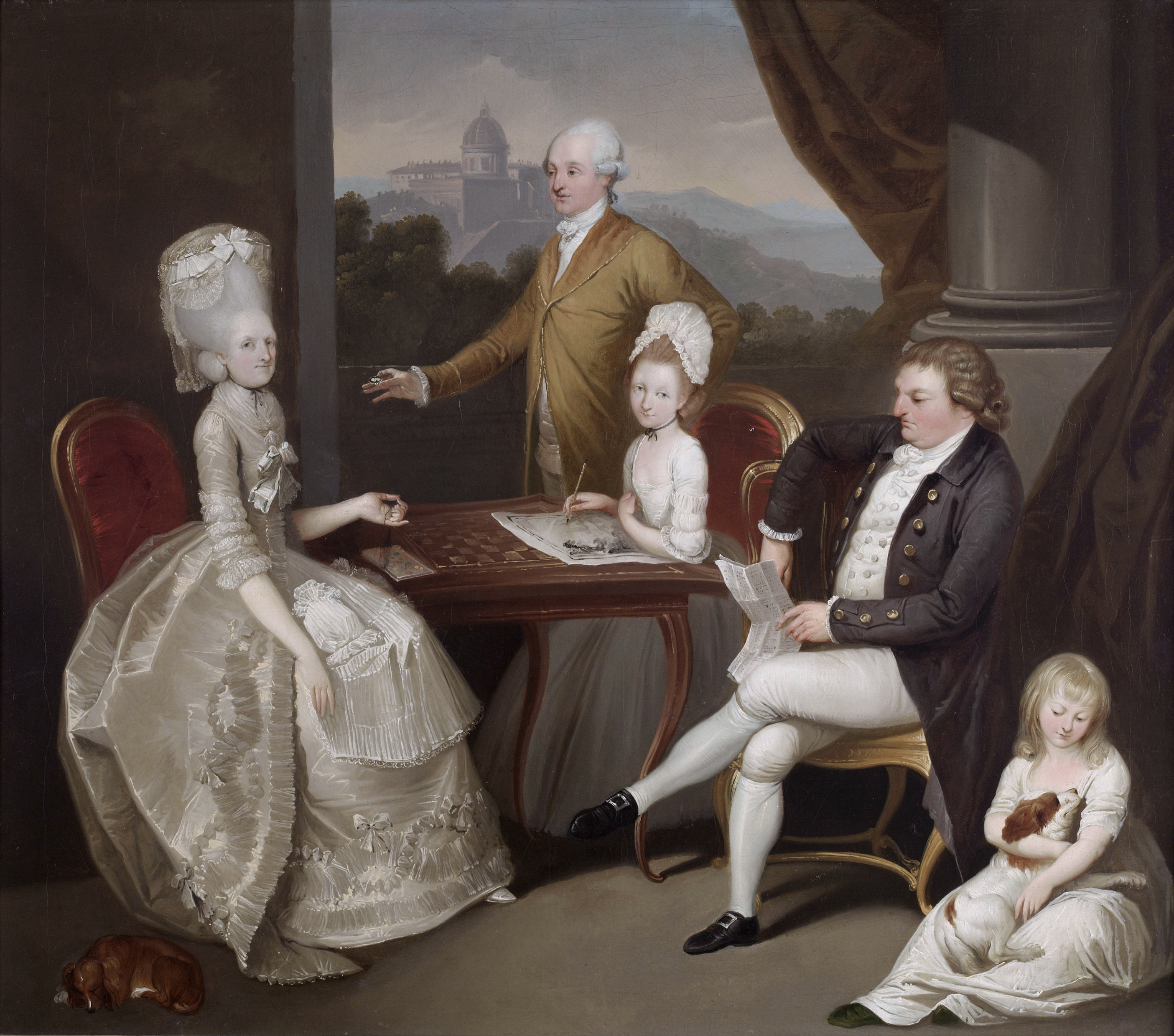
Portrait of his father and mother, and his siblings Aubrey, Lady Catherine, and Lady Caroline, by Franciszek Smuglewicz.

William was born on 18 December 1766. He was the second son of Lady Catharine Ponsonby and Aubrey Beauclerk, 5th Duke of St Albans, a Whig Member of Parliament for Thetford from 1761 to 1768 and for Aldborough from 1768 to 1774. His elder brother was Aubrey Beauclerk, 6th Duke of St Albans (father of Aubrey Beauclerk, 7th Duke of St Albans). His younger brothers were Adm. Lord Amelius Beauclerk (principal Naval aide de camp to King William IV and Queen Victoria) and the Rev. Lord Frederick Beauclerk (Vicar of Kimpton, Redbourn and St Michael's who married Hon. Charlotte Dillon-Lee, the daughter of Charles Dillon-Lee, 12th Viscount Dillon). His sisters included Lady Catherine Beauclerk (wife of Rev James Burgess, Vicar of Hanworth), Lady Caroline Beauclerk (wife of Hon. Charles Dundas, fourth son of Thomas Dundas, 1st Baron Dundas).

His father was eldest surviving son of Mary Chambers (eldest daughter and co-heiress of Thomas Chambers of Hanworth) and Vere Beauclerk, 1st Baron Vere (third son of Charles Beauclerk, 1st Duke of St Albans, himself the illegitimate son of Charles II of England and his mistress, Nell Gwyn). His mother was the eldest daughter of William Ponsonby, 2nd Earl of Bessborough and Lady Caroline Cavendish (eldest daughter of William Cavendish, 3rd Duke of Devonshire).

== Career ==
He entered the Royal Navy in 1782 and was made a Lieutenant in 1788.

=== Peerage ===
His father succeeded his grandfather as the 2nd Baron Vere of Hanworth on 1 October 1781. In 1787, his father succeeded his childless cousin, George as the 5th Duke of St Albans. The 4th Duke had inherited the dukedom from his childless second cousin, George Beauclerk, 3rd Duke of St Albans (the only son of the 2nd Duke).

When his father died on 9 February 1802, his elder brother Aubrey succeeded to the Dukedom, holding the title until his death on 12 August 1815 when he was succeeded by his five-month old son, Aubrey. Upon his death the following year on 19 February 1816, William became the 8th Duke of St Albans holding the title until his death in 1825.

== Personal life ==
On 20 July 1791, He married, firstly, Charlotte Thelwell (c. 1769–1797), the daughter and heiress of Rev. Robert Carter Thelwall of Redbourne Hall, Lincolnshire. and Charlotte Nelthorpe (a daughter of Sir Henry Nelthorpe, 5th Baronet). Before her death on 19 October 1797, they were the parents of one child:

- William Robert Beauclerk (1794–1794), who died in infancy.

He married, secondly, Maria Janetta Nelthorpe (c. 1779–1822), on 4 March 1799. Maria was the only daughter and heiress of John Nelthorpe of Little Grimsby Hall (the former High Sheriff of Lincolnshire) and Mary Cracroft (second daughter, by his first wife, of Robert Cracroft of Hackthorn Hall). Before her death in 1822, they were the parents of thirteen children:

- Lady Maria Amelia Beauclerk (1800–1873), who died unmarried.
- William Beauclerk, 9th Duke of St Albans (1801–1849), who married Harriet Mellon and, after her death, Elizabeth Catherine Gubbins.
- Lady Charlotte Beauclerk (1802–1842), who died unmarried.
- Lady Caroline Janetta Beauclerk (1804–1862), who married Arthur Capell, 6th Earl of Essex.
- John Nelthorpe Beauclerk (1805–1810), who died in childhood.
- Lady Louisa Georgiana Beauclerk (1806–1843), who married Thomas Hughan, son of Thomas Hughan, MP. They were parents of Janetta Manners, Duchess of Rutland.
- Capt. Lord Frederick Charles Peter Beauclerk (1808–1865), who married Jemima Johnstone.
- Lady Georgiana Beauclerk (1809–1880), who married Sir Montague Cholmeley, 2nd Bt.
- Lady Mary Noel Beauclerk (1810–1850), who married Thomas Corbett, MP for North Lincolnshire.
- Lord Henry Beauclerk (1812–1856), who died unmarried.
- Lord Charles Beauclerk (1813–1861), who married Laura Stopford and had issue. His son Aubrey Topham Beauclerk was the father of Charles Beauclerk, who in 1964 became 13th Duke of St Albans.
- Capt. Lord Amelius Wentworth Beauclerk (1815–1879), who married Frances Harrison and had issue, including William Abdy Beauclerk and Frances Maria Janetta Beauclerk (mother of Brigadier-General Sir George Camborne Beauclerk Paynter).
- Lord George Augustus Beauclerk (1818–1880), who died unmarried.

The Duchess died on 17 January 1822. The Duke of St Albans died on 17 July 1825 and was succeeded by his son, from his second wife, William.

== Ancestry ==
Ancestors of William Beauclerk, 8th Duke of St Albans

16. Charles II of England
8. Charles Beauclerk, 1st Duke of St Albans
17. Eleanor Gwyn
4. Vere Beauclerk, 1st Baron Vere
18. Aubrey de Vere, 20th Earl of Oxford
9. Lady Diana de Vere
19. Diana Kirke
2. Aubrey Beauclerk, 5th Duke of St Albans
10. Thomas Chambers
5. Mary Chambers
22. Charles Berkeley, 2nd Earl of Berkeley
11. Lady Mary Berkeley
23. The Hon. Elizabeth Noel
1. William Beauclerk, 8th Duke of St Albans
24. William Ponsonby, 1st Viscount Dungannon
12. Brabazon Ponsonby, 1st Earl of Bessborough
25. Mary Moore
6. William Ponsonby, 2nd Earl of Bessborough
26. John Margetson
13. Sarah Margetson
27. Alice Caulfeild
3. Lady Catherine Ponsonby
28. William Cavendish, 2nd Duke of Devonshire
14. William Cavendish, 3rd Duke of Devonshire
29. The Hon. Rachel Russell
7. Lady Caroline Cavendish
30. John Hoskyns
15. Catherine Hoskins
31. Catherine Hale

Peerage of England
Preceded by Aubrey Beauclerk	Duke of St Albans; 1816–1825	Succeeded by William Beauclerk
