= William Beauclerk =

William Beauclerk may refer to:

- Lord William Beauclerk (1698–1733), MP for Chichester
- William Beauclerk, 8th Duke of St Albans (1766–1825), British peer
- William Beauclerk, 9th Duke of St Albans (1801–1849), British peer
- William Beauclerk, 10th Duke of St Albans (1840–1898), British peer
