= Maria Beauclerk, Duchess of St Albans =

Maria Janetta Beauclerk, Duchess of St Albans (c. 1779 – 17 January 1822), formerly Maria Janetta Nelthorpe, was the second wife of William Beauclerk, 8th Duke of St Albans, and the mother of the 9th Duke.

== Early life ==
Maria was the only daughter of John Nelthorpe and his wife, the former Mary Cracroft, of Little Grimsby Hall. Nelthorpe had been High Sheriff of Lincolnshire in 1775, and was related to the Nelthorpe baronets.

== Personal life ==
Maria married the future duke on 4 March 1799, at Little Grimsby, Lincolnshire, his first wife, Charlotte Thelwell, having died in October 1797, leaving no surviving children. Beauclerk inherited the dukedom in 1816, as a result of the death, in infancy, of his nephew, Aubrey Beauclerk, 7th Duke of Saint Albans. His wife then became Duchess of St Albans.

The couple had thirteen children:

- Lady Maria Amelia Beauclerk (1800-1873), who died unmarried.
- William Beauclerk, 9th Duke of St Albans (1801-1849)
- Lady Charlotte Beauclerk (1802-1842), who died unmarried.
- Lady Caroline Janetta Beauclerk (1804-1862), who married Arthur Capell, 6th Earl of Essex and had children
- Lord John Nelthorpe Beauclerk (1805-1810), who died in infancy
- Lady Louisa Georgiana Beauclerk (1806-1843), who married Thomas Hughan, and had children
- Captain Lord Frederick Charles Peter Beauclerk (1808-1865), who married Jemima Johnstone and had children
- Lady Georgiana Beauclerk (1809-1880), who married Sir Montague Cholmeley, 2nd Baronet, and had children
- Lady Mary Noel Beauclerk (1810-1850), who married Thomas Corbett (Lincolnshire MP) and had children. Their descendants include Samantha Cameron, née Sheffield, wife of former British Prime Minister David Cameron.
- Lord Henry Beauclerk (1812-1856), who died unmarried.
- Lord Charles Beauclerk (1813-1861), who married Laura Stopford and had children.
- Captain Lord Amelius Wentworth Beauclerk (1815-1879), who married Frances Harrison and had children.
- Lord George Augustus Beauclerk (1818-1880), who died unmarried.

The duchess died in London, and was outlived by her husband. Her brother, John Nelthorpe, had died in 1819.
