= Bell, Cookson, Carr and Airey =

British banking partnership (1755–1839)

Bell, Cookson, Carr and Airey, also known as The Old Bank, was a private banking partnership established in Newcastle upon Tyne by or before 1755, instigated by Ralph Carr. The claim is made that it is the oldest British country or provincial banking company. The Old Bank continued, under many different names as members of the partnership from time to time changed, until 1839, when as Messers Ridley, Bigge, & Co. it was purchased and folded into the ill-fated Northumberland and Durham District Bank.

== Antecedent and formation ==
Bell, Cookson, Carr and Airey was formed at the instigation of Ralph Carr, a wealthy Newcastle upon Tyne merchant having considerable experience in international trade, notably in Northern Europe and the Americacan colonies. Such trade depended, in part, on the handling, administration and settlement of bills of exchange - something Carr became intimately familiar with, and engaged in on his own account.

Maberly Phillips traces Carr's decision to form the bank back to circumstances arising from the Jacobite rising of 1745, when Charles Edward Stuart sought to regain the British throne for his father, James Francis Edward Stuart. After the British forces loss at the Battle of Prestonpans and the occupation of Edinburgh by the Jacobites, the Duke of Cumberland's army moved north through Newcastle, one of the largest towns near the scene of action. Money was required in Newcastle to pay the troops, and all the gold that could possibly be gathered, had to be sent to Scotland for similar purposes. Ralph Carr availed himself of the business opportunities thus offered; records show that he forwarded to Scotland, at various times, no less than £30,000 in coin, and that he cashed a number of orders raised by Sir John Cope and others. The fulfilment of these obligations put him in communication with an Edinburgh merchant and banker, John Coutts, with whom he struck up a friendship; and also with George Campbell, a London banker. Phillips specifies that so well did Carr carry out the supply of money to the Duke's army, that after the country had been restored to quietness, Campbell suggested to him the suitability of his forming a bank in Newcastle. Carr relates, in a letter, both Campbell's suggestion, and also the notion of starting a bank so as to provide an opportunity for James Coutts, son of the Edinburgh merchant John, who had died by 1751, and who when ill had asked Carr to take care of his sons.

Thus, acting upon the suggestion of Campbell, Carr entered into partnership with three other Newcastle men "of considerable wealth and position", Matthew Bell, John Cookson, and Joseph Airey, to carry on a business as "Bankers and Dealers in Exchange". Each provided £500 of capital, and the enterprise was run from the Pilgrim Street house of Airey. The date of formation is uncertain; the earliest extant deed of partnership is dated 1 January 1756; the Newcastle Courant of 23 August 1755, announces that "Yesterday, Notes were issued from the Bank Established in this Town by a Company of Gentlemen of Character and Fortune, which will be of infinite advantage to this place"; and both the Courant and Journal of 22 November 1755, advertise: "Notice is hereby given that the Newcastle Bank will be opened on Monday next, at the house late Mr. Robinson's, in Pilgrim Street, where all Business in the Banking and Exchange Way will be transacted as in London", but this may simply speak of a change of premises. In this context, it is notable that James Coutts was made a partner in George Campbell's bank, forming Campbell & Coutts, in 1755, and so if the Newcastle bank was a vehicle for the apprenticeship of Coutts, it may have been established some time before 1755.
