= Ralph Carr (merchant) =

British merchant and banker (1711–1806)

Ralph Carr (1711–1806) was a British businessman and banker who occupied a leading position in Newcastle upon Tyne in the 18th century. He was one of the foremost merchants upon the Tyne; founder of a famous bank in Newcastle; a considerable landowner in Northumberland and Durham; and an earnest and liberal supporter of numerous schemes of progress and philanthropy.

== Biography ==
=== Early life ===
Ralph Carr was born on the 22 September 1711, the son of John Carr, a mining operator in Cumberland and Westmorland, agent to Lord Thanet, the Claverings of Axwell, and others, and the purchaser, in 1704, of the estate of Dunston Hill, in Whickham, Gateshead; and Sarah, daughter of William Wynne, of Gateshead, woolstapler.

His grandfather was John Carr, merchant and boothman, apprenticed, in 1655, to Phineas Allen, and set over the following year to William Johnson (father of Sir Nathaniel Johnson, Mayor and M.P., governor of the Leeward Islands and of South Carolina), whose daughter Abigail, widow of William Bonner, he married.

Ralph Carr was descended from Cuthbert Carr, of St. Helen's Auckland, known locally for his defence of the Newcastle's New Gate during the 1644 siege of the town.

Ralph Carr, being destined for a commercial career, was apprenticed to Matthew Bowes, merchant adventurer and boothman. In due time he was admitted to his freedom, and, having made a tour through Holland and Germany to the Baltic, as far as the newly founded city of St. Petersburg, he commenced life on his own account in Newcastle in the year 1737.

The account-books, letters, and manuscripts relating to Ralph Carr's business undertakings for more than half a century have been preserved. They show that soon after his commencement he was engaged in commercial operations of magnitude and value. The death of his father, in 1739, gave him the Dunston Hill property, and enabled him to extend still further his business transactions. Like most merchants of his time, he speculated in coals and iron, timber and corn, wine and spirits, butter and tea, tobacco and snuff, and dealt in a wide variety of other articles; he was at one and the same time shipowner and merchant, broker and underwriter, commission agent and bill discounter. His financial position was such that when, in September, 1745, Charles Edward Stuart - Bonnie Prince Charlie - landing at Lochaber, raised the standard of rebellion, and troops came marching through the North of England to prevent the revolt from spreading, he was able to render profitable service to the British government. He advanced cash to commanding officers against drafts on the Pay Office; collected and transmitted money (in one month he sent £30,000) for the use of the army in Scotland, and speculated in corn, stores, and forage required by the royal troops.

=== Banking ===
Among his friends and correspondents in these proceedings were John Coutts and his brother Alexander, who were conducting in London and Edinburgh a business similar to his own. Out of their acquaintance sprang the idea of establishing in Newcastle an independent provincial bank. No country town in at that time possessed a business where banking alone was transacted. There were several establishments called banks, notably Woods's at Gloucester and Smith's at Nottingham, where other branches of trade were carried on in the same premises. But Ralph Carr projected an establishment to deal in money and nothing else, and in the summer of 1755, he and his friends formally opened a banking-house pure and simple. The Newcastle Courant of 23 August 1755 announced that "Yesterday, Notes were issued from the Bank established in this Town by a Company of Gentlemen of Character and Fortune, which will be of infinite Advantage to this place."

The first partners in the bank were Ralph Carr, Matthew Bell, John Cookson, and Joseph Airey, who undertook by their deed to carry on for ten years, from the 1st January, 1756, the business of "bankers and dealers in exchange" at Joseph Airey's residence in Pilgrim Street. The capital was only £2,000, divided into four equal shares, but the partners were all men of wealth and credit, and the liability was unlimited. Strengthened by the addition of Joseph Saint to the partnership, and the succession of John Widdrington (Mr. Carr's nephew) after the death of Airey, the banking business grew and prospered until, at the end of 1774, the firm found themselves with a note issue of £180,000; cash and bills in hand, £103,597; with other bankers, £47,860; navy bills, £14,609; overdrafts, £38,000; deposits exceeding £85,000, and a profit upon the twelve months' trading of £5,712. For thirty-two years Ralph Carr was the guiding spirit of Bell, Cookson, Carr and Airey. What was at first an experiment had proved a remarkable success, and when he retired from the concern, at the close of the year 1787, the creator of provincial banking had seen his example copied all over the country, and his own financial house in Newcastle designated as "The Old Bank" to distinguish it from local imitators.

=== Family life ===
Carr's preoccupation with his commercial life in Newcastle left him no time to think of marriage until he was forty-seven years old; then he married Isabella, only surviving daughter of the Rev. Henry Byne, Vicar of Ponteland. Although Carr had considerably enlarged the house at Dunston Hill, extended the boundaries of the grounds surrounding it, and beautified the property by judicious planting of ornamental trees, he resided for a long time before his marriage, and for some years after it, at Cross House, Westgate Street, Newcastle. Dunston Hill was probably Carr's summer resort; but in after years he made it more and more his permanent home, and fixed his town residence in Charlotte Square, Newcastle. His place of business as a merchant was in Hanover Square, Newcastle, where his nephew, and sometime partner, John Widdrington, the younger, resided, and from where he dispatched the greater part of that voluminous correspondence with Northern Europe and the American colonies which has been preserved by his descendants.

=== Landed gentleman ===
Having accumulated wealth, Ralph Carr began, like many Newcastle merchants before and since, to invest it in landed estate.

He had obtained in 1769 a profitable lease from Merton College, Oxford, of the parishes of Ponteland and Embleton in Northumberland, and in 1784 he purchased from the Carrs of Eshott the estate of High and Low Hedgely, Northumberland. Upon this property he at once commenced to indulge the love of forestry which he had developed to some extent at Dunston Hill. Besides enlarging the mansion - Hedgeley Hall - at High Hedgely, he extended the gardens, laid out extensive woods and plantations, and diverted the course of the river Breamish through the estate from a dangerous into a manageable channel. A few years later he bought Prendwick, in the parish of Alnham; and about the same time acquired from Mr. Bell, of Woolsington, the estates of Bygate Hall, in Upper Coquetdale, and Lumsdon, upon Rede Water. Towards the close of his life he purchased from his friend Sir John Dick, who had acquired it during a long residence as British Consul at Leghorn, a fine collection of oil paintings and statuary, and added to his library valuable works on maritime jurisprudence and international law.

=== Religion and politics ===
Like his father, Ralph Carr was a member of the Nonconformist congregation assembling first at the Close Gate, and afterwards in Hanover Square, Newcastle — of which latter place of worship he was a trustee. Carr's politics are obscure. He voted in 1774 for Sir Walter Blackett and Sir Matthew White Ridley, the "magistrates'" candidates, who were opposed by Constantine J. Phipps and Thomas Delaval, the candidates of the "burgesses"; in 1777 he voted for Sir John Trevelyan against the adventurer Andrew Robinson Stoney; in 1780 he plumped for Ridley, against Bowes and Delaval. Local considerations so completely influenced these elections that votes afford no clue to views on Imperial questions, but it is known from his letters and papers that he was opposed to the Americans in their struggle for independence, and that in other matters he sympathised with the policy of the elder Pitt. On social questions his opinions were broad and clear. In one of his books, when he was 85 years of age, he wrote: "I remember when there was only one ale-house in Whickham. Now there are seventeen, and equally increased in Swalwell, chiefly occasioned by the great increase of brewers, who encourage people to set up public-houses and become bondsmen and intercessors with the justices to license them, who are culpably too ready to do it on account of their fees. This is ruin to the lower class, and calls for redress, for upon a fair calculation there is more paid at this day for drink alone than was expended fifty years ago for house-rent, clothing, provisions, and every other support of families."

But severe as were his strictures upon the drinking customs of his day, and the poverty and misery engendered by them, he was a liberal contributor to the wants of the deserving poor. He was one of the founders of Newcastle Infirmary, a generous supporter of the local dispensaries, the Lying-in Hospital, and kindred institutions. Every week for some years he gave to forty-eight persons — twelve from each of the four parishes of Newcastle — sums varying from 1s. to 2s. each, while he dispensed unlimited bounty to wayfarers at his own door.

=== Old age and death ===
After his retirement from business, Ralph Carr lived the life of an active magistrate and country gentleman. He was for fifty years a Justice of the Peace for the county of Durham, and in his eighty-first year was able to state that he had scarcely once missed attending the Assizes during the preceding half century.

Although he had arrived at a somewhat mature age when he married, he had the satisfaction of seeing his eldest son, John Carr, united to a daughter of the house of Ellison, of Hebburn; his second son, Ralph, holding a distinguished position at the bar; and his second daughter, Harriet, occupying a high position in the social and artistic world as the wife of Colonel Cheney, of the Grenadier Guards, afterwards General Cheney, who was made aide-de-camp to the king for his services in the Peninsula under Sir John Moore. Two years after his grandson, Ralph Carr-Ellison, was born, Ralph Carr died on 7 May 1806, at the age of ninety-four, and a few days later he was buried in the chancel of the church of Ponteland.
