= Charles Beauclerk =

Charles Beauclerk may refer to:

- Charles Beauclerk, 1st Duke of St Albans (1670–1726), British peer
- Charles Beauclerk, 2nd Duke of St Albans (1696–1751), British peer
- Charles Beauclerk, 11th Duke of St Albans (1870–1934), British peer
- Charles Beauclerk, 13th Duke of St Albans (1915–1988), British peer
- Charles Beauclerk, 15th Duke of St Albans (born 1965), British scholar, author and politician
- Charles Sidney Beauclerk (1855–1934), Jesuit priest
- Charles William Beauclerk (1816–1863), English cricketer
- Charles George Beauclerk (1774–1845), British Member of Parliament
