= Portrait of Harriet Mellon =

Painting by William Beechey

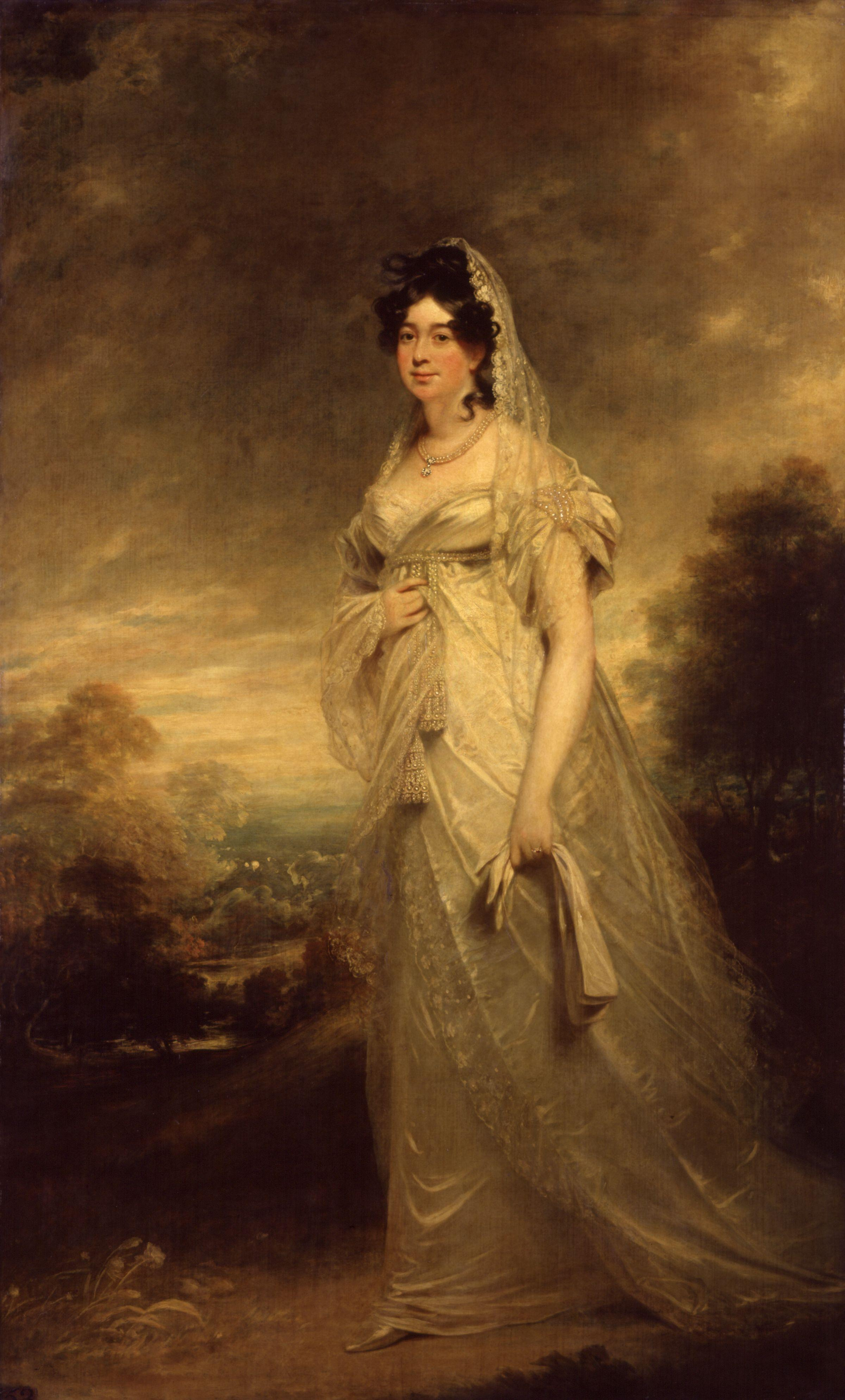
- Artist: William Beechey
- Year: c. 1815
- Type: Oil on canvas, portrait
- Dimensions: 240 cm × 147 cm (94 in × 57.9 in)
- Location: National Portrait Gallery, London

Portrait of Harriet Mellon is a c.1815 portrait painting of the Irish actress Harriet Mellon by the English artist Sir William Beechey. It was exhibited at the Royal Academy's Annual Exhibition at Somerset House in 1818.

Mellon rose from humble background to become an established star star appearing at the Theatre Royal, Drury Lane in London. She married twice first to the financier Thomas Coutts who left her control of the bank Coutts on his death and then became the Duchess of St Albans after marrying the Ninth Duke. Extremely wealthy from her first marriage she was a prominent figures of society during the Regency era. Beechey, a noted British portraitist, painted her five times. This version likely shows Mellon in her wedding dress shortly after her March 1815 marriage to Coutts. Beechey recorded the fee as two hundred guineas. It is now in the National Portrait Gallery in London having been acquired in 1921.

== Bibliography ==
- Highfill, Philip H, Burnim, Kalman A. & Langhans, Edward A. A Biographical Dictionary of Actors, Actresses, Musicians, Dancers, Managers & Other Stage Personnel in London, 1660-1800, Volume 10. SIU Press, 1973.
- Perkin, Joan. The Merry Duchess. Athena Press 2002.
- Walker, Richard John Boileau. Regency Portraits, Volume 1. National Portrait Gallery, 1985.
