= Suzanne Beauclerk, Duchess of St Albans =

English writer and painter

Her Grace The Duchess of St Albans

Personal details
- Born: Suzanne Marie Adèle Fesq; 4 May 1921 Kuala Lumpur; British Malaya
- Died: 12 February 2010 (aged 88)
- Resting place: Kensal Green Cemetery
- Spouse: Charles Beauclerk, 13th Duke of St Albans (m. 1947)
- Children: 5

Suzanne Marie Adèle Beauclerk, Duchess of St Albans (née Fesq; 4 May 1921 – 12 February 2010), known professionally as Suzanne St Albans, was a British writer and painter.

== Early life and family ==
Suzanne Marie Adèle Fesq was born on 4 May 1921 in Kuala Lumpur, British Malaya. She was of French descent on her mother and father's sides. Her father was Emile William Fesq (1887, Woolwich, Australia – 1978, Vence, France), a wealthy planter, owner of Assam Java Plantation in Selangor, Malay Peninsula. Her mother, Marie-Claire, was a member of the Chassériau merchant family. Her paternal great-grandfather was a wine exporter from Bordeaux who settled in Australia in 1848 (where he founded Fesq & Company in Sydney, a family-owned wine distribution firm), after he married a Creole mulatto woman he met during his travels on the New Orleans shipping route. Her maternal great-grandfather, Leopold Chassériau, also from Bordeaux, was a rubber planter who settled in Malaya. She grew up in British Malaya and in Vence, Southern France. She attended boarding school in Paris and in Littlehampton.

== World War II ==
During the outbreak of World War II the Fesq family were living in Southern France. After the German invasion, the family made their way along with other refugees to Saint-Jean-de-Luz where they were evacuated by HMS Ettrick and brought to England.

Once in England she worked as a librarian in Bedfordshire, before being taken on by the Psychological Warfare Branch of the Foreign Office. She was first stationed in Algiers. She was transferred to Italy in 1944 where she worked in Naples, Rome, Florence, Bologna, and Venice. In 1945 she was posted at the British Embassy in Vienna, where she was under the command of Lieutenant-Colonel Charles Beauclerk, the future 13th Duke of St Albans, whom she married, becoming his second wife, on 19 March 1947.

== Painting ==
While serving in Rome during World War II, she took painting lessons. Back in England she enrolled at Slade School of Fine Art after being denied entry into Chelsea College of Arts. Her work, mostly oil and watercolour paintings, was exhibited at the Royal Academy in 1963 and in 1965. She and her husband ran the Upper Grosvenor Gallery in Mayfair from 1967 until 1972.

== Personal life ==
She married Charles Beauclerk on 19 March 1947 after he obtained a divorce from his first wife, Nathalie Chatham Walker. Upon her marriage she became the stepmother of Murray Beauclerk, the future 14th Duke of St Albans. They had five children:

- Lord Peter Charles de Vere Beauclerk (born 13 January 1948)
- Lord James Charles Fesq de Vere Beauclerk (born 6 February 1949)
- Lord John William Aubrey de Vere Beauclerk (born 10 February 1950)
- Lady Caroline Anne de Vere Beauclerk (born 19 July 1951)
- unnamed daughter (born & died 15 November 1963)

When her husband succeeded to the dukedom in 1964 after the death of his second cousin Osborne Beauclerk, 12th Duke of St Albans, she became the Duchess of St Albans. She served as Vice President of the Soldiers, Sailors, Airmen and Families Association and was a fundraiser for the Red Cross. In 1978 her husband was sued by the Inland Revenue for not paying taxes. They left England and settled at her family's farmhouse in Southern France. She retired to Newbury after her husband's death in 1988, becoming The Dowager Duchess of St Albans as her stepson's wife, Cynthia Theresa Mary Howard, became the new Duchess of St Albans. In her later life she taught lessons in French, Latin, German, and English. She died on 12 February 2010.

== Bibliography ==
- Le Théâtre en Classe (1966)
- The Mimosa and the Mango: A Memoir of Childhood (1974); reprinted in a limited edition by Slightly Foxed (2012)
- The Road to Bordeaux (1976)
- Uncertain Wings (1977)
- Green Grows the Oil: Desert Oil and Modern Society (1982)
- Where Time Stood Still: A Portrait of Oman (1982)
- Magic of a Mystic: Stories of Padre Pio (1983)
- Paradise and Pestilence: Aspects of Provence (1997)
- Mango and Mimosa: A Memoir of Early Life (2000) - single-volume edition of all three memoirs
