= James Coutts =

James Coutts or Jim Coutts may refer to:

- Jim Coutts (1938–2013), Canadian lawyer, businessman, and former advisor to two Prime Ministers
- James Coutts (footballer) (born 1987), English professional footballer
- James Coutts (MP) (1733–1778), Member of Parliament for Edinburgh, 1762–68
