= Diana Beauclerk =

Diana Beauclerk may refer to:

- Diana Beauclerk, Duchess of St Albans (1679–1742), British courtier
- Lady Diana Beauclerk (1734–1808), English noblewoman and artist
- Diana de Vere Beauclerk (1842–1905), English writer
