= William Beauclerk, 9th Duke of St Albans =

English cricketer

His Grace The Duke of St Albans
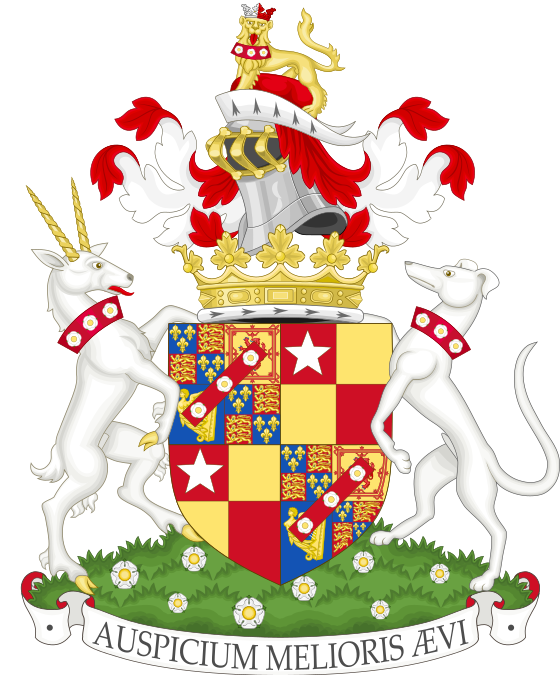
- Coat of arms of the Duke of St Albans
- Preceded by: William Beauclerk, 8th Duke of St Albans
- Succeeded by: William Beauclerk, 10th Duke of St Albans

Personal details
- Born: William Aubrey de Vere Beauclerk; 24 March 1801 Hampshire, England
- Died: 27 May 1849 (aged 48) Middlesex, England
- Spouses: Harriet Coutts née Mellon (m. 1827; died 1837); Elizabeth née Gubbins (later Viscountess of Falkland) (m. 1839)
- Children: 1 son and 2 daughters
- Parent(s): William Beauclerk, 8th Duke of St Albans; Maria Janetta née Nelthorpe
- Relatives: Lord Amelius Beauclerk (uncle); Lord Frederick Beauclerk (uncle); Caroline, Countess of Essex (sister); Lady Georgina Cholmeley (sister); Janetta, Duchess of Rutland (niece)
- Education: Christ's College, Cambridge
- Occupation: First-class cricketer

William Aubrey de Vere Beauclerk, 9th Duke of St Albans (24 March 1801 – 27 May 1849), styled the Hon. William Beauclerk before 1815 then Earl of Burford until 1825, was a 19th-century English cricketer and member of the House of Lords.

== Background and education ==
Beauclerk was born in Hampshire, the eldest son of William Beauclerk, 8th Duke of St Albans, and his second wife, Maria Janetta née Nelthorpe. He was educated at Westminster School and Christ's College, Cambridge.

His paternal grandparents were Lady Catharine Ponsonby and Aubrey Beauclerk, 5th Duke of St Albans, a Whig Member of Parliament. His mother was the only daughter and heiress of John Nelthorpe, sixth of the Nelthorpe baronets, and Mary Cracroft.

== Cricket ==
Beauclerk played cricket for Hampshire in 1817, and then minor cricket for the Gentlemen of Middlesex and Marylebone Cricket Club.

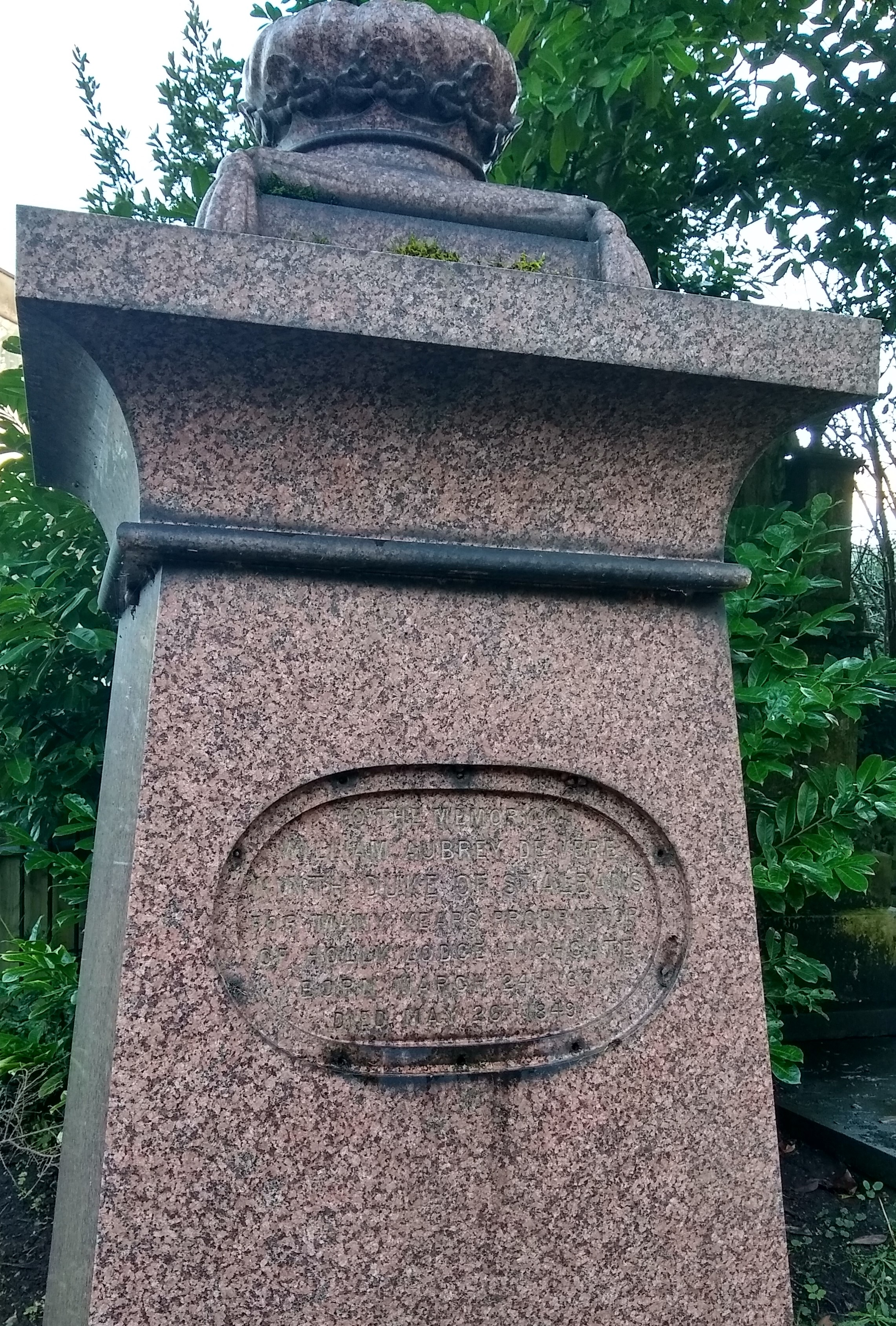
Monument to Beauclerk in Highgate Cemetery

== Family ==
On 16 June 1827 at the Mayfair Chapel, Beauclerk married Harriet Coutts née Mellon (1777–1837), who was 23 years his senior. She had been an actress before marrying her first husband, the banker Thomas Coutts.

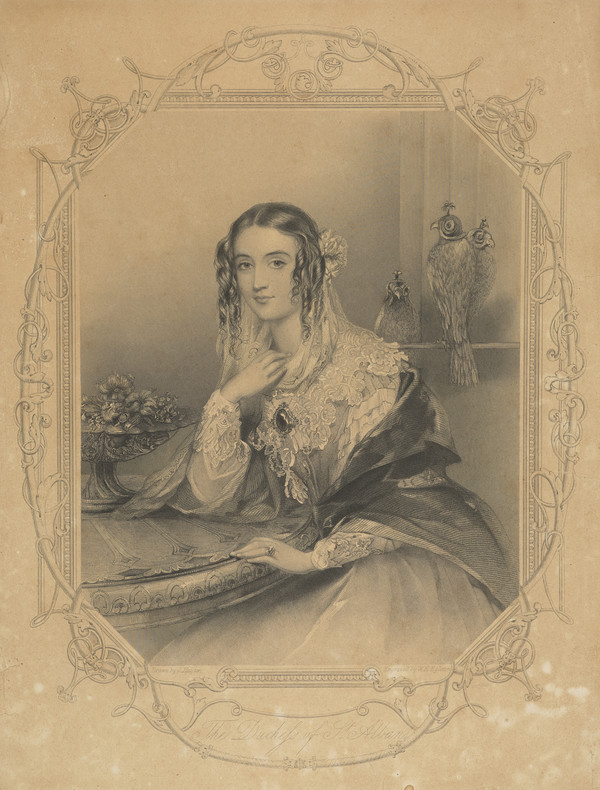
Elizabeth, Dowager Duchess of St Albans, later Viscountess of Falkland (died 1893)

Beauclerk married secondly Elizabeth Catherine Gubbins on 29 May 1839 at Harby, Leicestershire. Gubbins was youngest daughter of Joseph Gubbins (1776–1832), a major-general of Kilfrush in County Limerick, by his first wife Charlotte Bathoe. The duke and duchess had three children:

- William Amelius Aubrey de Vere Beauclerk, 10th Duke of St Albans
- Lady Diana de Vere Beauclerk (1842–1905), who married John Walter Huddleston
- Lady Charlotte Beauclerk (1849–1892).

Beauclerk died on 27 May 1849 at the Holly Lodge in Highgate. There is a monument in his memory at Highgate Cemetery (west) with an inscription which reads: "To the memory of William Aubrey de Vere, 9th Duke of St Albans, for many years proprietor of Holly Lodge, Highgate; Born March 24th 1801, Died May 26th 1849."

After Beauclerk's death, the dowager duchess remarried on 10 November 1859 to Lucius Cary, 10th Viscount of Falkland, as his second wife. She died on 2 December 1893 at St Leonards-on-Sea, Sussex.

=== Descendants ===
Through his only son, the 9th Duke was grandfather of Osborne Beauclerk, 12th Duke of St Albans, Lady Moyra Beauclerk (wife of Lord Richard Cavendish), Lady Katherine Beauclerk (wife William Lambton), Lady Alexandra Beauclerk and Lord William Beauclerk.

== Titles and estates ==
Beauclerk succeeded to the dukedom in 1825, taking family titles including Hereditary Grand Falconer of England.

His first marriage to Harriet Coutts, wealthy widow of banker Thomas Coutts, came with a substantial dowry of £30,000, an estate at Woodham Walter in Essex, and a life interest in Holly Lodge in Highgate, Middlesex and Stratton House on Piccadilly, Mayfair). When the duchess died on 6 August 1837, she left her husband a £10,000 annuity and interests in her London properties, but these were for life only and did not pass to his heirs. Most of the Coutts Bank fortune went to Angela Burdett-Coutts, granddaughter of Thomas Coutts (from his first marriage).

Beauclerk carried the Sceptre with the Cross at the coronation of William IV in 1830.

The duke and duchess divided their time between Holly Lodge in Highgate, and Saint Albans House on Regency Square, Brighton, as well as their London townhouse and ancestral seats in Redbourne (Lincolnshire) and Bestwood Park (Nottinghamshire).

== See also ==
- Duke of St Albans

Peerage of England
Preceded by William Beauclerk	Duke of St Albans; 1825–1849	Succeeded by William Beauclerk
