= Thomas Coutts =

British banker (1735 – 1822)

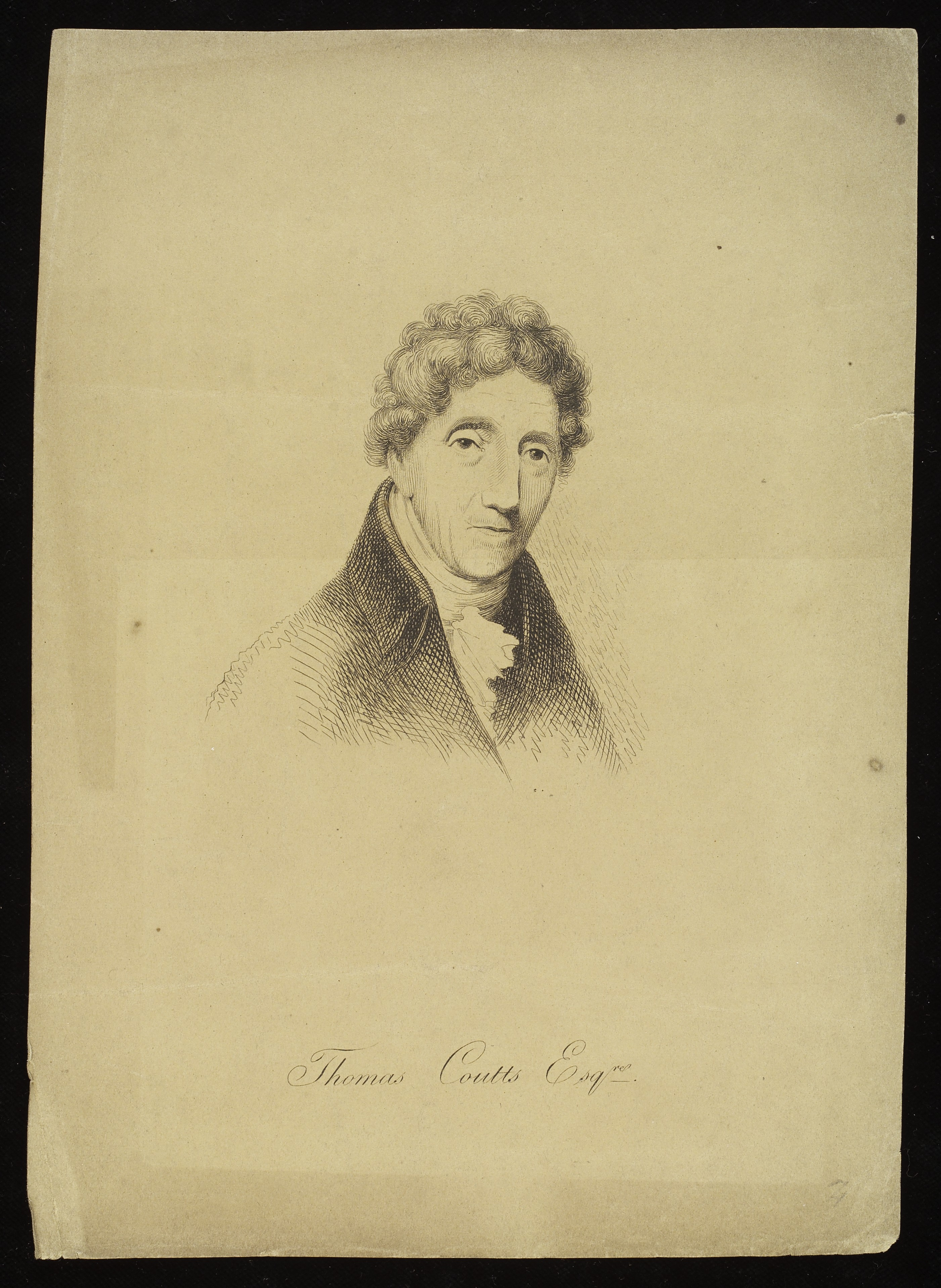
- Portrait of Thomas Coutts by William Beechey
- Born: 7 September 1735
- Died: 24 February 1822 (aged 86)
- Education: Royal High School
- Known for: Founder of Coutts & Co
- Spouses: Susannah Starkey (m. 1763; died 1815) Harriet Mellon (m. 1815)
- Children: 3
- Parent(s): John Coutts; Jean Steuart Coutts
- Relatives: James Coutts (brother); Angela Burdett-Coutts (granddaughter)

Thomas Coutts (7 September 1735 – 24 February 1822) was a British banker. He was a founder of the banking house Coutts & Co.

== Early life ==
Coutts was the fourth son of Jean (née Steuart) Coutts and John Coutts (1699–1751), whose business in Edinburgh was as a corn factor and negotiator of bills of exchange, and in 1742 was elected lord provost of the city. The family was originally of Montrose, but in about 1696 one of its members settled in Edinburgh, where in due course Thomas was educated at the Royal High School.

== Career ==
Soon after the death of John Coutts the business was divided into two branches, with one continuing in Edinburgh, the other in London. The London banking business was in the hands of Thomas and his brother James, an MP. Following the death of his brother in 1778, as surviving partner Thomas became sole head of the firm, and it was under his direction the banking house rose to the highest distinction. His ambition was to establish his character as a man of business and make a fortune, and he lived to succeed and enjoy his reputation and wealth. A gentleman in manners, hospitable and benevolent, he counted amongst his friends some of the literary men and the actors of his day. Of the enormous wealth which came into his hands he made munificent use.

== Personal life ==
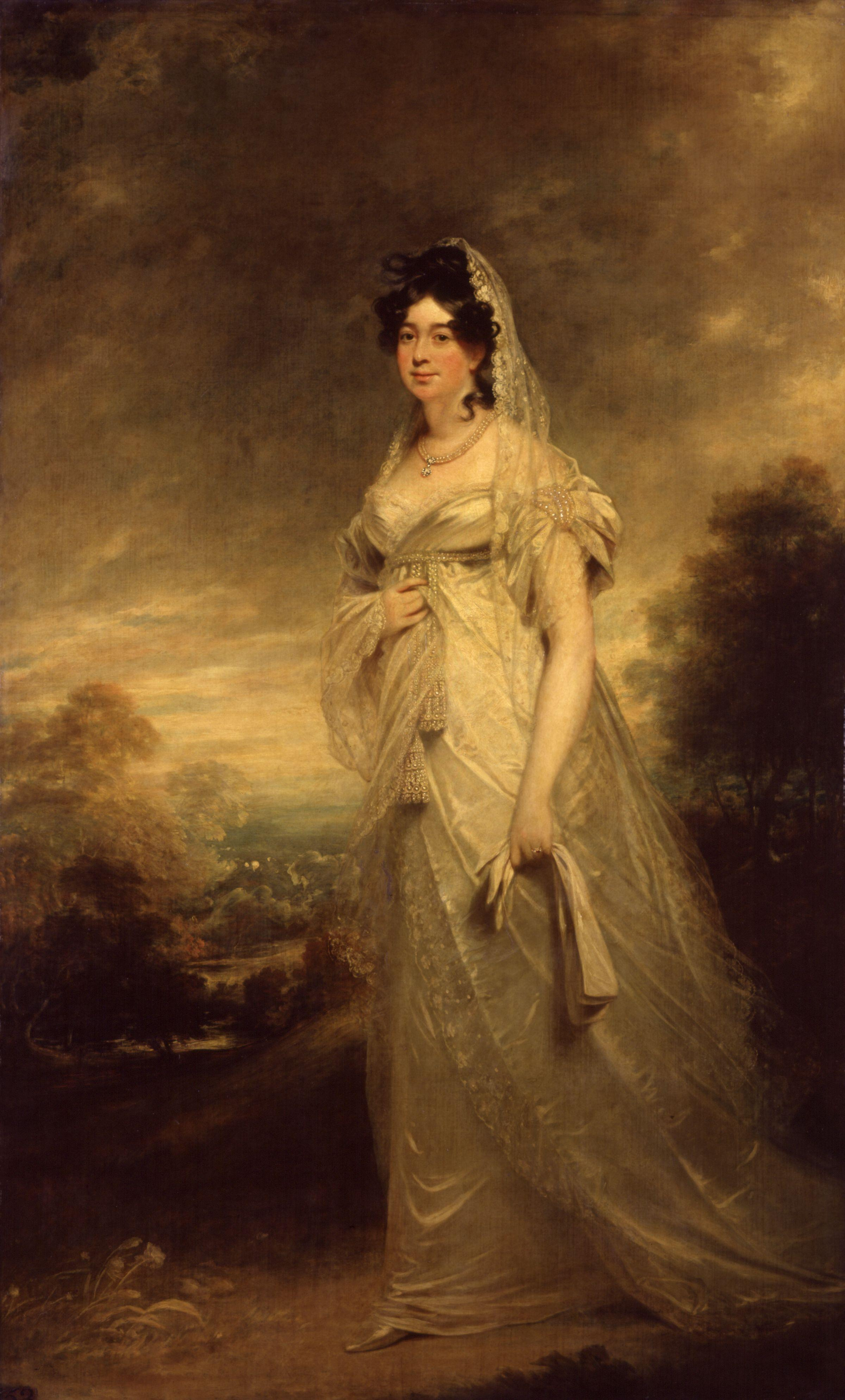
Portrait of Harriet Mellon by William Beechey. Coutts' second wife who he married in 1815.

In May 1763 he married Susannah Starkey (variously reported as Elizabeth, Betty, or Susan), a young woman whose origins were humble. She was in attendance on the daughter of his brother James. They appear to have had a happy marriage, and had three daughters:

- Susan Coutts (c. 1765–1837), who in 1796 married George Augustus North, 3rd Earl of Guilford.
- Frances Coutts (1773–1832), who in 1800 married John Crichton-Stuart, 1st Marquess of Bute.
- Sophia Coutts (1775–1844), who in 1793 married Sir Francis Burdett, 5th Baronet, a "zealous and courageous advocate of reform who more than once endured imprisonment for his radical views."

Coutts's first wife died on 4 January 1815. On 18 January, Coutts married Harriet Mellon, a popular actress. She was 37 years old; he was 79.

He died in London on 24 February 1822, leaving his entire fortune to his widow. In 1827, she remarried William Beauclerk, 9th Duke of St Albans, who was 23 years her junior. She died ten years later, bequeathing her property to Thomas's granddaughter, her step-granddaughter Angela, the youngest daughter of Sir Francis Burdett. Angela then assumed the additional name and arms of Coutts. In 1871, Angela was created Baroness Burdett-Coutts.

=== Legacy ===
The HCS Thomas Coutts, a merchant ship of the British East India Company active from at least 1826 to 1839, was named for Coutts.
