= William Miller, Lord Glenlee =

Scottish advocate and landowner

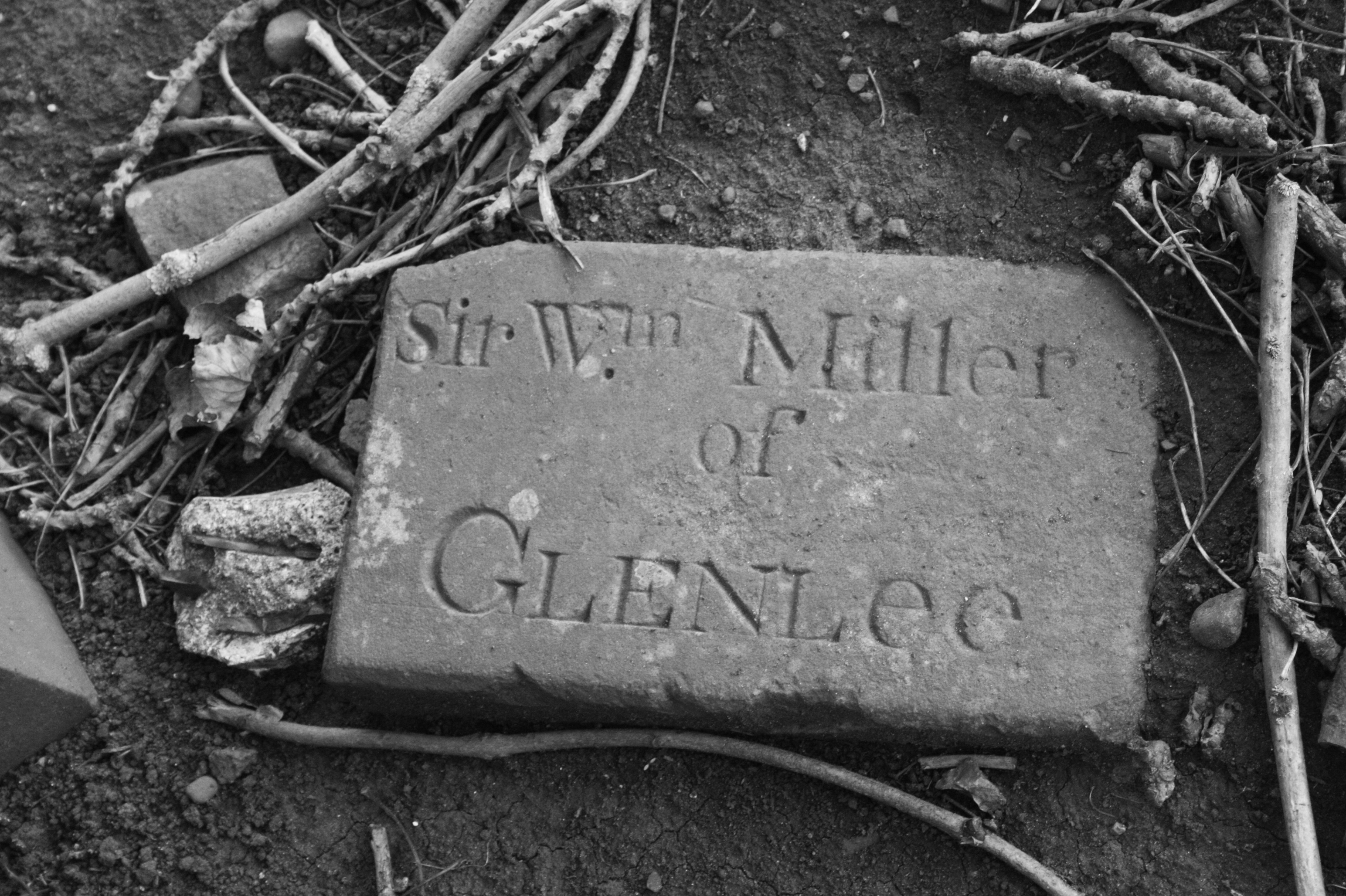
Marker stone to Lord Glenlee, New Calton Burial Ground

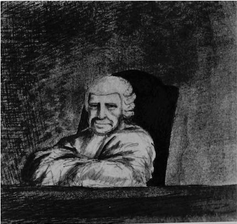
Sir William Miller, Lord Glenlee

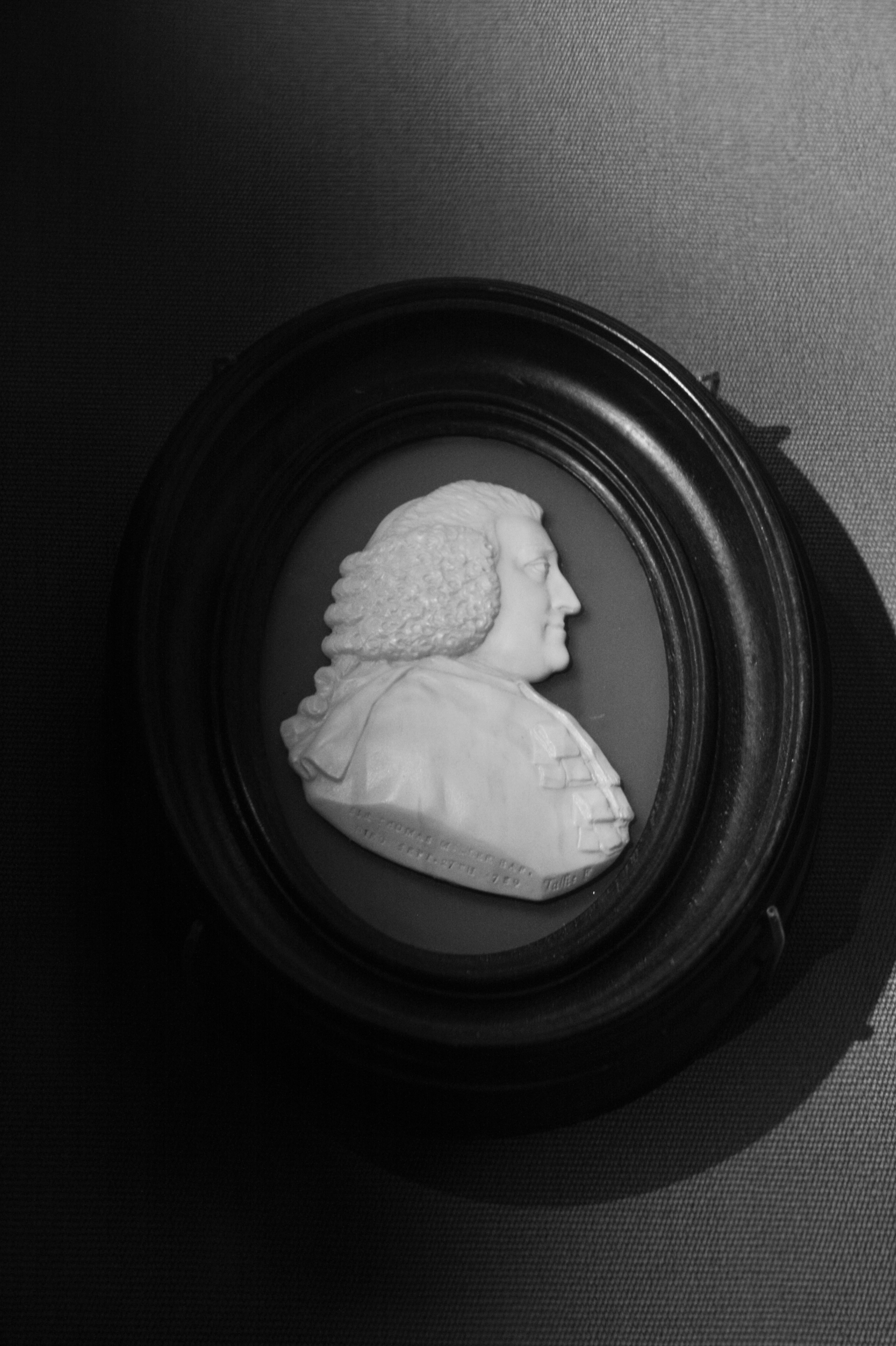
Cameo of William Miller, Lord Glenlee

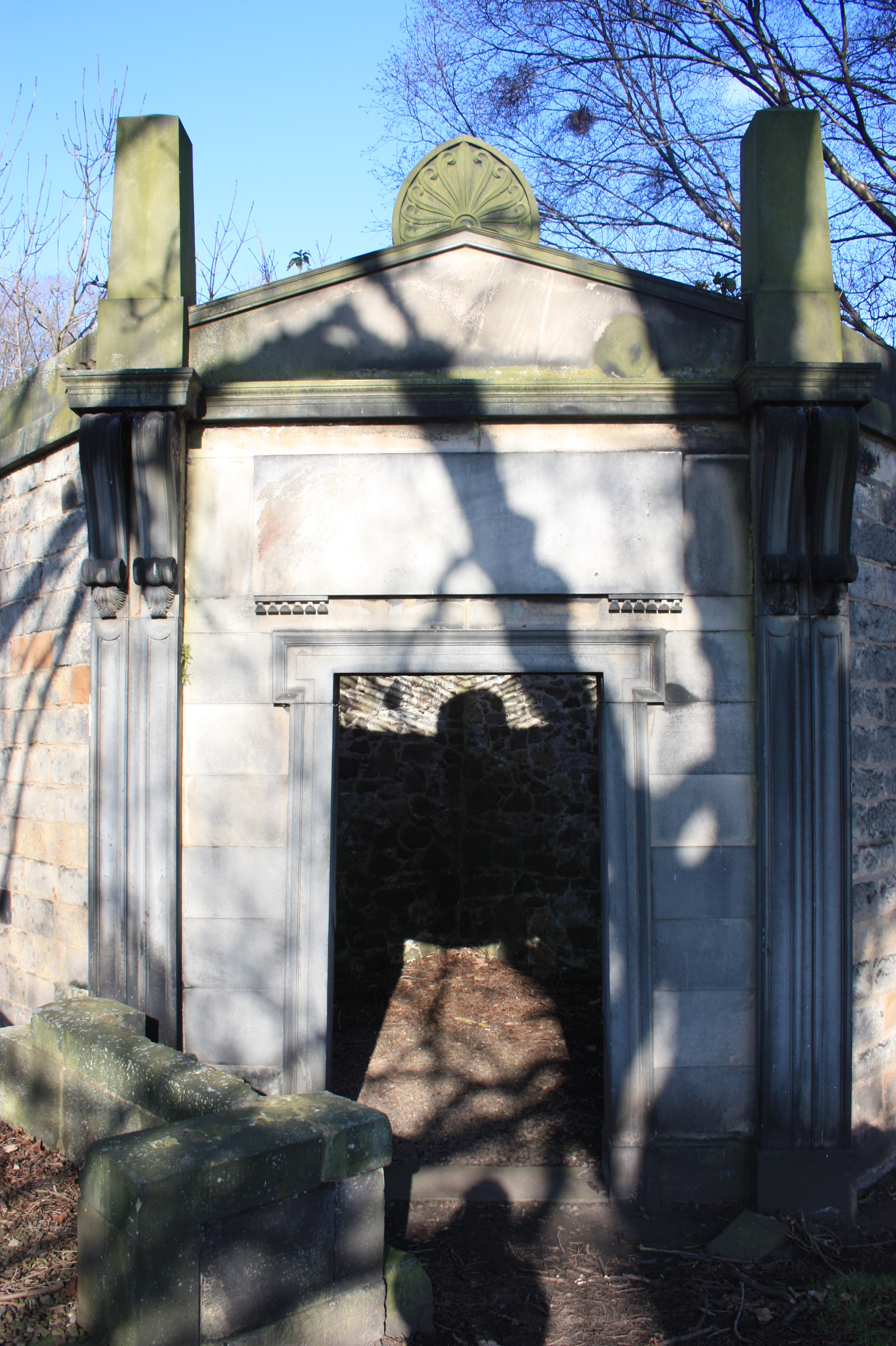
The tomb of Sir William Miller, Lord Glenlee, New Calton Burial Ground

Sir William Miller, 2nd Baronet, Lord Glenlee, FRSE FSSA (1755–1846) was a Scottish advocate, judge, and landowner.

== Life ==
He was born on 12 August 1755 the only son of Sir Thomas Miller, Lord Glenlee by his first wife, Margaret Murdoch. He was educated at the High School in Edinburgh then studied law at the University of Edinburgh. He passed the Scottish bar and became an advocate in 1777.

He was briefly the Member of Parliament for Edinburgh, 1780-1781, when he was unseated by a petition, which then passed the seat to Laurence Dundas. He became Clerk of the Justiciary in 1783.

In 1781 he was the first "Admitted Fellow" of the Society of Scottish Antiquaries.

In 1783 he was a co-founder of the Royal Society of Edinburgh. He served as the Society's Vice President from 1816 until 1846. In 1789 on the death of his father, he inherited the baronetcy. In 1795 (already a baronet) he was elected a Senator of the College of Justice, in place of Alexander Murray, Lord Henderland and adopted the title "Lord Glenlee", the same title which his father had held.

His Edinburgh townhouse was at 17 Browns Square.

He retired in 1840 and died on 9 May 1846 at his country mansion at Barskimming on the Ayrshire coast. He is buried in a vault in the north-east corner of New Calton Burial Ground in Edinburgh.

== Legal cases ==
At the age of 19, Miller played a part in the trial of John Reid, a case involving James Boswell. The trial was resolved by Miller's uncle, Patrick Miller, who was a judge.

In 1781 he also spoke in defence of Sir Hugh Palliser's appointment at Greenwich Hospital.

== Family ==
In 1777 he married his cousin Grizel Chalmers, daughter of George Chalmers of Pittencrieff near Dunfermline, a wealthy grain merchant. Miss Chalmers was a noted singer at the Edinburgh Music Society based in St Cecilia's Hall.

They had five sons and four daughters, of whom three sons and three daughters survived, including Grizel Martha, Martha Miller, John Miller of Stewartfield WS and Thomas Miller.

His uncle was Patrick Miller of Dalswinton. His second son Lt Col William Miller of the Royal Horse Guards was killed at the Battle of Waterloo and is buried near Brussels but memorialised in the New Calton vault with Lord Glenlee.

== Artistic recognition ==
His portrait by William Walker is held in the Scottish National Portrait Gallery.

His caricature was also created by John Kay in 1799.

He was also sketched by Robert Scott Moncrieff around 1820.

Baronetage of Great Britain
| Preceded by Thomas Miller | Baronet (of Glenlee); 1789–1846 | Succeeded by William Miller |
