= Catherine Beauclerk, Duchess of St Albans =

British duchess, wife of the 5th Duke of St Albans

Her Grace The Duchess of St Albans
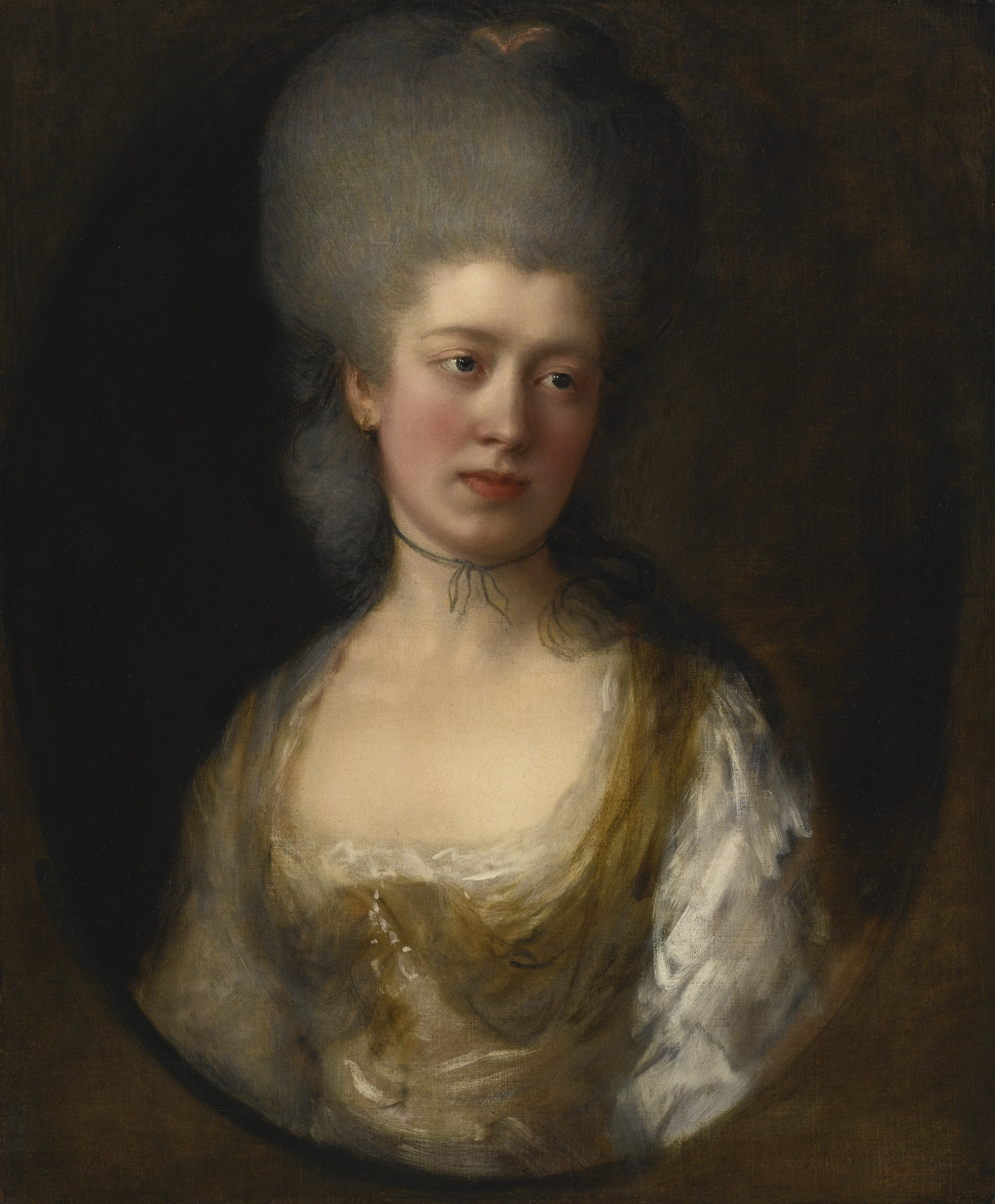
- Born: Lady Catherine Ponsonby; 14 October 1742
- Died: 4 September 1789 (aged 46)
- Noble family: Ponsonby (by birth); Beauclerk (by marriage)
- Spouse: Aubrey Beauclerk, 5th Duke of St Albans (m. 1763)
- Issue: Aubrey Beauclerk, 6th Duke of St Albans; William Beauclerk, 8th Duke of St Albans; Lady Catherine Burgess; Lord Amelius Beauclerk; Lord Frederick Beauclerk; Lady Caroline Dundas; Lady Georgiana Beauclerk
- Father: William Ponsonby, 2nd Earl of Bessborough
- Mother: Lady Caroline Cavendish

Catherine Beauclerk, Duchess of St Albans (née Lady Catherine Ponsonby; 14 October 1742 – 4 September 1789) was a British noblewoman. She was Duchess of St Albans through her marriage.

== Family ==
She was the daughter of William Ponsonby, 2nd Earl of Bessborough, and Lady Caroline Cavendish, the eldest of his three children. Her father was a politician in Ireland for most of his life.

She married Aubrey Beauclerk, 5th Duke of St Albans, on 4 May 1763 in London. They had seven children:

- Aubrey Beauclerk, 6th Duke of St Albans (1765–1815)
- William Beauclerk, 8th Duke of St Albans (1766–1825)
- Lady Catherine Elizabeth Beauclerk (c. 1768 – c. July 1803); married Rev. James Burgess on 1 September 1802.
- Admiral Lord Amelius Beauclerk (1771–1846); died unmarried.
- The Reverend Lord Frederick Beauclerk (1773–1850); married the Hon. Charlotte Dillon (daughter of Charles Dillon, 12th Viscount Dillon).
- Lady Caroline Beauclerk (c. 1775 – 23 November 1838); married the Hon. Charles Dundas (son of Thomas Dundas, 1st Baron Dundas).
- Lady Georgiana Beauclerk (1776 – 17 October 1791); died unmarried at age 15.

On 21 October 1781 Catherine received the title of Mrs. Vere de Hanworth, and from the rise of her husband, became Duchess of St Albans on 10 February 1787. The couple lived in Rome for about three years. Their journey there may have been to avoid rumours in the press of a relationship between Catherine Beauclerk and Thomas Brand though on 4 June 1778, Lady Mary Lowther noted that 'Mr Beauclerk, Lady Catherine and Mr Brand were gone together abroad, being so in debt they found it troublesome staying at home'. The artist Franciszek Smuglewicz painted them in Rome twice.

Aubrey Beauclerk died on 9 February 1802 at age 61.
