= Charles Beauclerk, 13th Duke of St Albans =

British soldier and peer

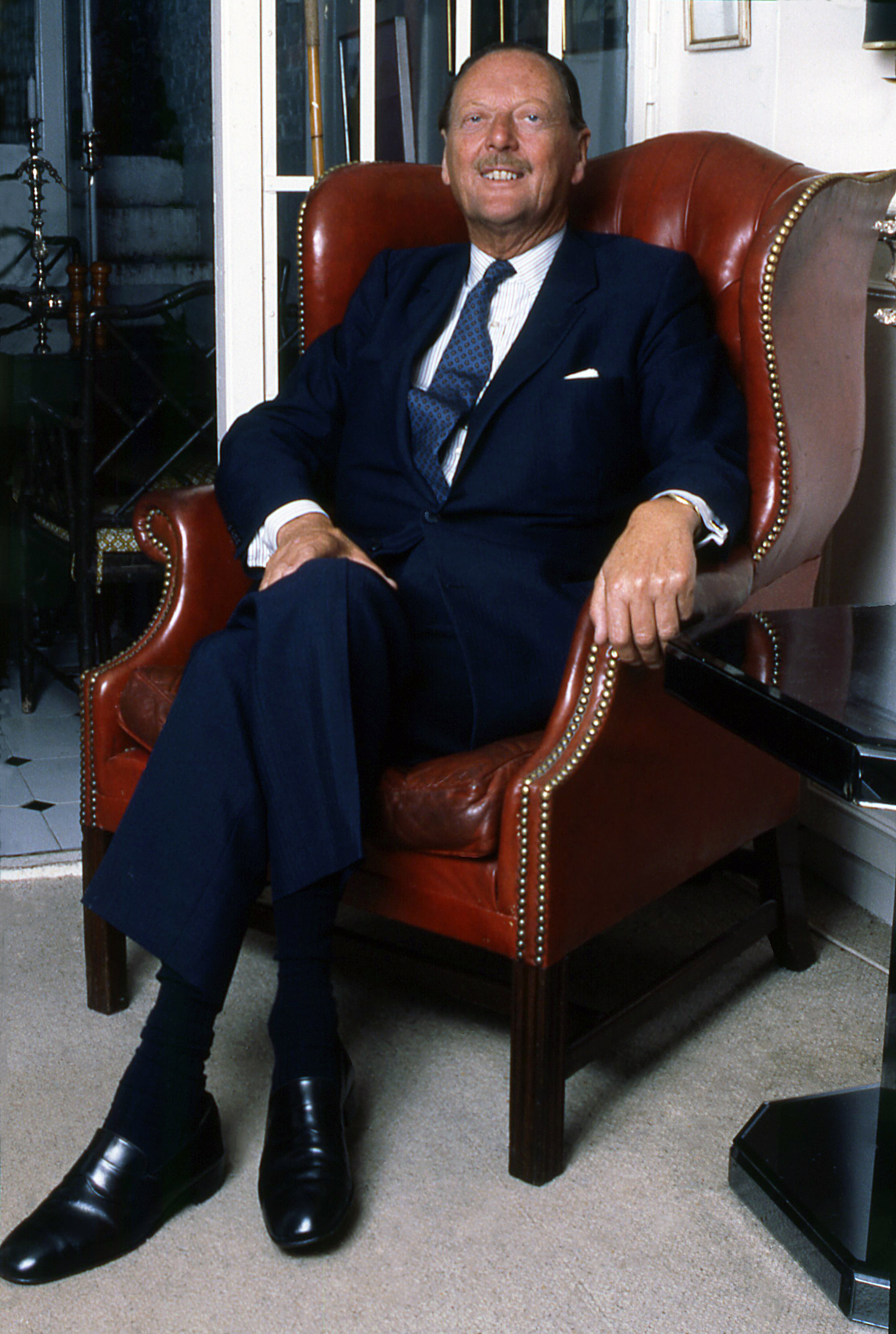
- Charles, 13th Duke of St. Albans (London, 1981 by Allan Warren)

- Coat of arms
- Tenure: 1964–1988
- Predecessor: Osborne Beauclerk, 12th Duke of St Albans
- Successor: Murray Beauclerk, 14th Duke of St Albans
- Spouses: Nathalie Chatham Walker (m. 1938; div. 1947) Suzanne Fesq (m. 1947)
- Issue: 6, including: Murray Beauclerk, 14th Duke of St Albans; Lord Peter de Vere Beauclerk; Lord James de Vere Beauclerk; Lord John de Vere Beauclerk; Lady Caroline de Vere Beauclerk
- Father: Aubrey Topham de Vere Beauclerk
- Mother: Gwendolen Loftus Hughes

Charles Frederick Aubrey de Vere Beauclerk, 13th Duke of St Albans, OBE (16 August 1915 – 8 October 1988) was a British soldier and hereditary peer.

== Early life and education ==
St Albans was the son of Aubrey Topham de Vere Beauclerk (1850–1933) and Gwendolen Loftus Hughes (1880–1958) and a great-grandson of William Beauclerk, 8th Duke of St Albans. His father had married late, and he was an only child. At his birth he stood ninth in the line of succession to the dukedom. He was educated at Hordle House School, Eton and Magdalene College, Cambridge.

== Career ==
Before the war St Albans worked as a journalist, entering the profession in 1937 with the London evening paper The Star. On the outbreak of the World War II he enlisted and was commissioned in the British Army, reaching the rank of Lieutenant colonel of the Intelligence Corps before the age of 30. He was later recruited by the Political Warfare Executive and posted to North Africa, and was afterwards deployed to the British Embassy in Vienna. From 1946 to 1950 he ran the information services and public relations branch of the Allied Commission for Austria. He then joined the Central Office of Information, where he became head in turn of its Film, Radio and Book divisions.

He succeeded to the dukedom and other titles upon the death of his cousin Osborne Beauclerk, 12th Duke of St Albans in 1964, at which point he was director of the Office's film division. He left the civil service shortly afterwards, said to have been the first holder of the title to have worked in a regular salaried post, and, having inherited comparatively little, went into business. With his second wife, he ran the Upper Grosvenor Gallery in Mayfair from 1967 until 1972.

His commercial ventures initially prospered, allowing him to recover a number of family portraits and other heirlooms, which he kept at a home in Chelsea. One of his enterprises grew into a publicly listed conglomerate that he chaired; when a takeover bid emerged he sold his shareholding in a way that benefited both himself and other shareholders but attracted criticism for having pre-empted rival offers. He attempted to rebuild a family fortune through a series of other ventures, which led to losses and an accusation of mishandling of share dealing in relation to the company Grendon Securities. He also lost heavily after pulling out of a group of companies on finding that they were being criminally mismanaged, and as a result sold his London home and most of his family possessions. In the 1970s, St Albans moved to Vence in France, before becoming a resident of Monaco.

As Hereditary Grand Falconer of England, the Duke had an ancient entitlement to an annual side of venison from deer culled in the Royal Parks, which he gave to charity.

== Marriages and issue ==
St Albans married Nathalie Chatham Walker (1915–1985), daughter of Percival Field Walker, on 21 March 1938. They divorced in 1947 having had one son:

- Murray de Vere Beauclerk, 14th Duke of Saint Albans (19 January 1939 − 22 April 2026), a chartered accountant who held the courtesy title Earl of Burford during his father's lifetime. Had issue.

He married secondly Suzanne Marie Adèle Fesq, an author and daughter of Emile William Fesq, a third-generation Australian of largely French descent, on 19 March 1947. They had five children:

- Lord Peter Charles de Vere Beauclerk (born 13 January 1948). Had issue;
- Lord James Charles Fesq de Vere Beauclerk (born 6 February 1949);
- Lord John William Aubrey de Vere Beauclerk (born 10 February 1950). Married twice and had issue;
- Lady Caroline Anne de Vere Beauclerk (born 19 July 1951). Had issue;
- unnamed daughter (born & died 15 November 1963).

== Honours ==
St Albans was appointed an Officer of the Order of the British Empire (OBE) in 1945.

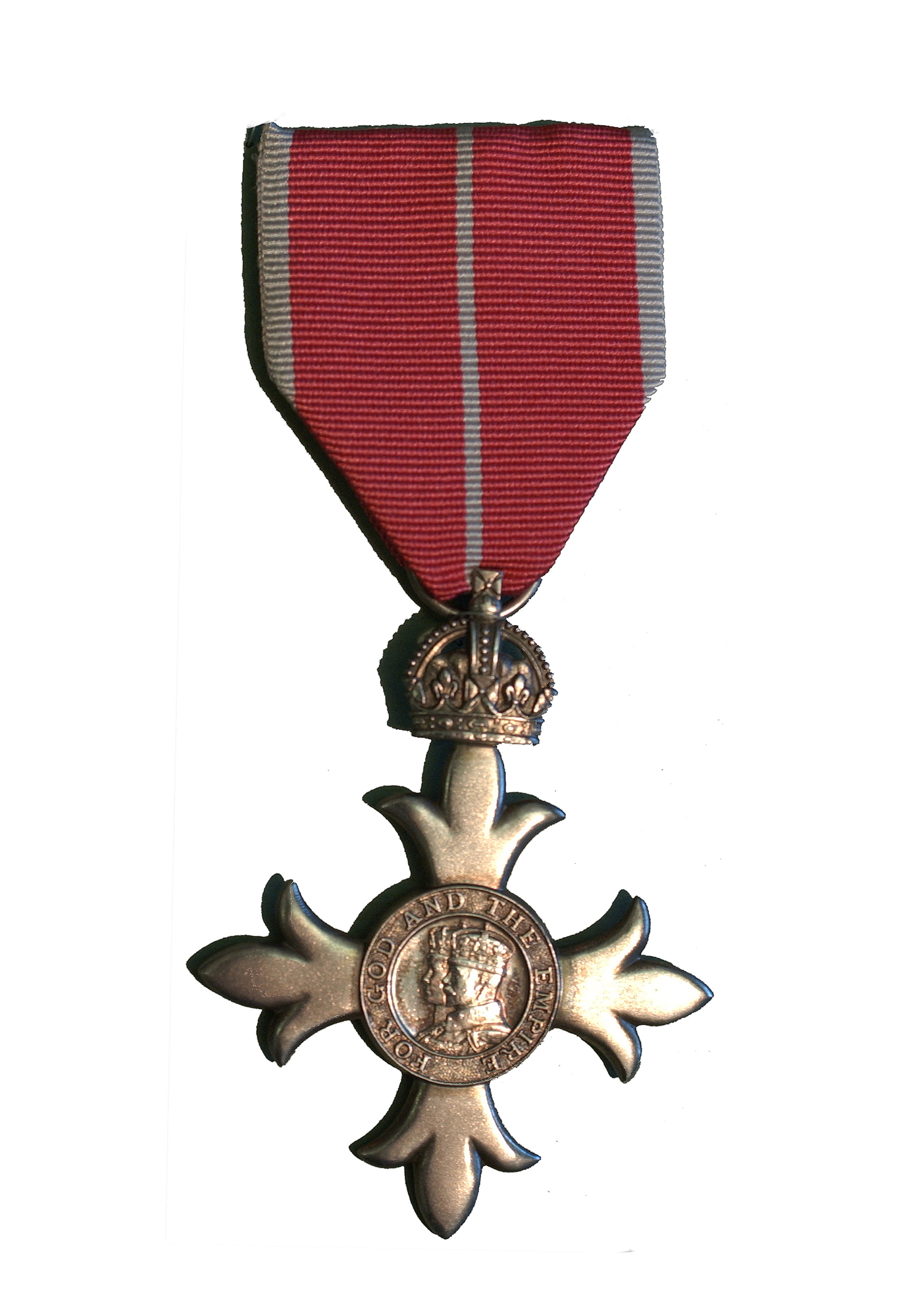
OBE insignia

== Death ==
St Albans died in 1988 at the age of 73 and was succeeded in the dukedom and other titles by his eldest son, Murray.

Peerage of England
Preceded by Osborne Beauclerk	Duke of St Albans; 1964–1988	Succeeded by Murray Beauclerk
