= Harriet Mellon =

Irish banker and actress

Her Grace The Duchess of St Albans
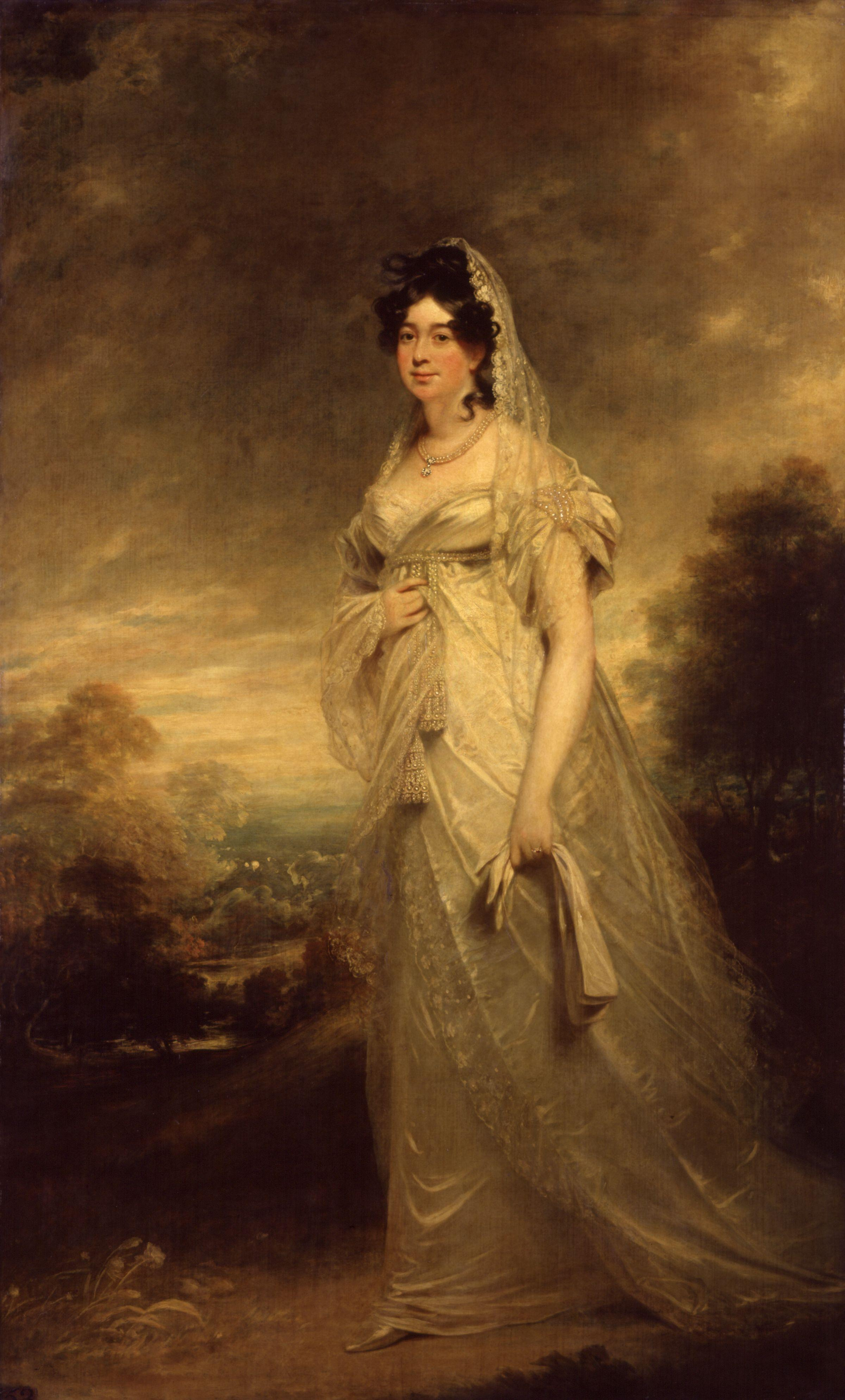
- Portrait of Harriet Mellon by William Beechey, c.1815

Personal details
- Born: Harriet (or Harriot) Mellon; 11 November 1777
- Died: 6 August 1837 (aged 59)
- Spouses: Thomas Coutts (m. 1815; died 1822); William Beauclerk, 9th Duke of St Albans (m. 1827)
- Parent: Matthew Mellon (father)

Harriet Beauclerk, Duchess of St Albans (alternative spelling: Harriot; née Mellon; 11 November 1777 – 6 August 1837) was an Irish actress who starred at Drury Lane. She was successively the wife of banker Thomas Coutts and then of William Beauclerk, 9th Duke of St Albans. She was widely celebrated for her beauty, and she was painted by George Romney and Sir Thomas Lawrence.

== Early life and first marriage ==
Mellon, according to her memoirs published in 1839, was born near Cork in the south of Ireland to parents who were typical cottiers of the period; that is poor Catholic subsistence farmers. This makes her rise to be the richest woman of her age all the more remarkable. When her village was visited by strolling players (members of a travelling theatre company) she decided upon a life as an actress; several accounts and obituaries state she was the illegitimate daughter of the Matthew Mellon who managed Portsmouth Theatre.

When she was young, she appeared at the Duke Street Theatre, where she attracted the attention of an elderly wealthy banker, Thomas Coutts, founder of Coutts & Co, the royal bank. Following his wife's death in 1815, she married him. From his previous marriage, he had three daughters – Susan (wife of the 3rd Earl of Guilford), Frances (wife of the 1st Marquess of Bute), and Sophia (wife of Sir Francis Burdett).

In 1822, after her husband's death, she became very wealthy, having been bequeathed his entire fortune, including his interest in the family bank. She purchased the lease on a country property four miles away at the Holly Lodge in Highgate, holding parties there and at her town house at 78 Stratton Street, Piccadilly. She also spent time at her house in Brighton, St Alban's House, 131 Kings Road, on the corner of Regency Square.

== Second marriage ==
In 1827, she married William Beauclerk, 9th Duke of St Albans, who was 23 years her junior. Sir Walter Scott wrote to her to congratulate her. Her reply is quoted in full in his journal for 30 June 1827. They were "old and true friends" and she wrote to him:

What a strange eventful life has mine been, from a poor little player child, with just food and clothes to cover me, dependent on a very precarious profession, without talent or a friend in the world – first the wife of the best, the most perfect being that ever breathed ...and now the wife of a Duke! You must write my life... my true history written by the author of Waverley.

On her death in 1837, her property and fortune went to her stepgranddaughter, who as a condition of the inheritance adapted her name to Angela Burdett-Coutts.

== See also ==
- List of entertainers who married titled Britons
