= Charles Beauclerk, 11th Duke of St Albans =

British peer and soldier

- Duke of St Albans
- Coat of arms
- Tenure: 1898–1934
- Predecessor: William Beauclerk, 10th Duke of St Albans
- Successor: Osborne Beauclerk, 12th Duke of St Albans
- Born: Charles Victor Albert Aubrey de Vere Beauclerk, Earl of Burford; 26 March 1870
- Died: 19 September 1934 (aged 64)
- Father: William Beauclerk
- Mother: Sybil Grey

Charles Victor Albert Aubrey de Vere Beauclerk, 11th Duke of St Albans (26 March 1870 – 19 September 1934) was a British peer and soldier, known as Earl of Burford before 1898.

Beauclerk was the eldest son of the 10th Duke of St Albans and a godchild of Queen Victoria and Albert Edward, Prince of Wales. He was educated at Eton and afterwards joined the 1st Regiment of Life Guards as a Second Lieutenant in 1893, becoming Captain of the South Nottinghamshire Yeomanry in 1898 and later serving with the 3rd Battalion of the Royal Scots Regiment.

Beauclerk inherited his father's titles in 1898 and died in 1934, aged 64. He was unmarried and childless and his titles passed to his half-brother, Osborne.

Beauclerk suffered from severe depression all his life, according to his half-brother Osborne or "Obby". Trustees looked after his affairs from 1898 until his death in 1934. He was confined under certificates at Ticehurst Asylum from January 1899 till his death.

Peerage of England
Preceded by William Beauclerk	Duke of St Albans; 1898–1934	Succeeded by Osborne Beauclerk
