= Aubrey Beauclerk =

Aubrey Beauclerk may refer to:

- Lord Aubrey Beauclerk (c. 1710–1741), Royal Navy officer
- Aubrey Beauclerk, 5th Duke of St Albans (1740–1802), British peer
- Aubrey Beauclerk, 6th Duke of St Albans (1765–1815), British peer
- Aubrey Beauclerk, 7th Duke of St Albans (1815–1816), British peer
- Aubrey Beauclerk (politician) (1801–1854), British politician
- Aubrey Beauclerk (cricketer) (1817–1853), English cricketer
