= John Coutts (merchant) =

Scottish merchant and banker

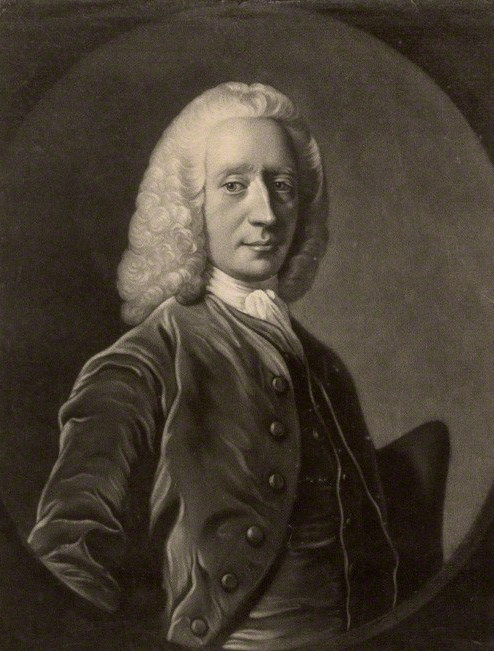
A portrait of Coutts

John Coutts (28 July 1699 – 23 March 1750) was a Scottish merchant and banker who served as Lord Provost of Edinburgh in 1742.

== Life ==
Born on 28 July 1699 either in Montrose or Edinburgh, Scotland, he was the eldest son of Patrick Coutts (1669–1704), a merchant in Edinburgh and Montrose, with trading interests in New York, Pennsylvania, Amsterdam, France and the Canaries. John was born to Patrick's first wife, Jean Dunlop of Garnkirk, on 28 July 1699. Patrick was fourth son of John Coutts. Provost of Montrose. When his father died (when John was 5) he was cared for by an uncle in Montrose. He was educated at the Old Grammar School in Montrose under Dr Robert Strachane and Dr Robert Milne. He went to Edinburgh in 1713 and served a mercantile apprenticeship for 5 years.

He started his own business as a commission agent and dealer in grain. After acquiring capital, he became a negotiator of bills (debts), a business which the banks then neglected. From 1728 he served a function akin to a merchant bank. Business partners included Thomas Haliburton of New Mains, Archibald Trotter of Castleshiel, and his cousin Robert Ramsay of Balmain. In Edinburgh he lived in a tall building on the High Street (Royal Mile at the head of Parliament Close near St Giles Cathedral. The block was also known as the "President's Stairs" the Lord President having formerly resided there, and had also been home to the Earl of Wemyss.

In 1730 Coutts entered Edinburgh town council, and in 1742 was elected Lord Provost, in place of George Haliburton, spending lavishly, and conducting banquets in his own home. He held office until 1744, having been re-elected once. He was a patron of the fine arts.

On the death of his younger brother, James Coutts, a merchant in London, in 1740 he inherited £20,000, a substantial fortune at that time.

Coutts fell into ill-health and went to Italy to recuperate, but died at Nola, near Naples, on 23 March 1750, at the age of 51.

== Family ==
On 10 April 1730 he married Jean Stuart, sister of his best friend, Sir John Stuart of Allanbank and granddaughter of Sir John Cochrane of Ochiltree.

By his wife Jean Stuart, who died in 1736, Coutts had five sons and a daughter. Of those sons, James and Thomas were founders of the banking house of Coutts & Co.; two other sons, John and Patrick, survived to adulthood. When John died in 1761, and Patrick became insane, the firm brought in an outsider, Sir William Forbes, 6th Baronet, who had worked in the Edinburgh end of the business.

His sister married John Stephen, a merchant in Leith.

== Artistic recognition ==
During his period as Lord Provost, Coutts commissioned his portrait by Allan Ramsay and this later passed to his descendant Baroness Burdett Coutts. The portrait was later etched by James Macardell.

== Notes ==
Attribution

This article incorporates text from a publication now in the public domain: Stephen, Leslie, ed. (1887). "Coutts, John". Dictionary of National Biography. Vol. 12. London: Smith, Elder & Co.
