= Osborne Beauclerk, 12th Duke of St Albans =

British peer and Army officer

His Grace The Duke of St Albans
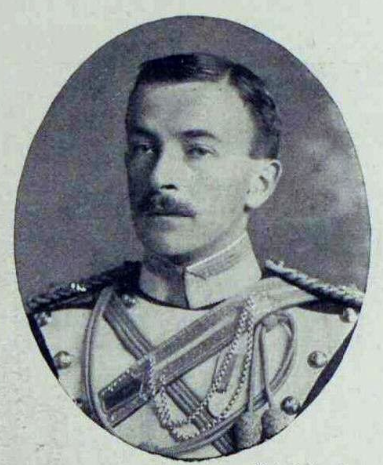
- Born: Lord Osborne de Vere Beauclerk; 16 October 1874
- Died: 2 March 1964 (aged 89)
- Spouse: Beatrix Beresford, Marchioness of Waterford (m. 1918; died 1953)
- Parent(s): William Beauclerk, 10th Duke of St Albans; Grace Bernal-Osborne
- Relatives: Charles Beauclerk, 11th Duke of St Albans (half-brother); Ralph Bernal Osborne (grandfather); William Beauclerk, 9th Duke of St Albans (grandfather)

Osborne de Vere Beauclerk, 12th Duke of St Albans (16 October 1874 – 2 March 1964) was a British peer and Army officer. He was styled Lord Osborne Beauclerk from 1874 to 1934.

== Early life ==
Lord Osborne Beauclerk was the son of William Beauclerk, 10th Duke of St Albans, and, his second wife, Grace Bernal-Osborne of County Tipperary, Ireland, daughter of Ralph Bernal Osborne, descendant of the politician and actor Ralph Bernal. From his father's first marriage, he had an elder half-brother, Charles Beauclerk, 11th Duke of St Albans, who suffered from severe depression all his life.

His father was the only son of William Beauclerk, 9th Duke of St Albans, and Elizabeth Catherine, daughter of Major General Joseph Gubbins.

== Career ==
Lord Osborne (known as Obby) was commissioned as a second lieutenant into the 17th Lancers on 7 December 1895 and promoted to lieutenant on 4 July 1896. He served with his regiment in South Africa during the Second Boer War, during which he was promoted to captain on 1 July 1901, and returned to the United Kingdom in December 1901. Following his return, he resigned from the army in September 1902, and was appointed captain of the South Nottinghamshire Hussars, a Yeomanry regiment, on 20 December 1902.

In 1911 and 1913 he set off on a trip to British Columbia, Canada where he was involved in a prospective mining investment at Cassiar, British Columbia; part of his time there was spent camping with partners British travelogue writer Warburton Pike and the American mining engineer Marshall Latham Bond. At the outbreak of World War I, Captain Beauclerk was appointed aide-de-camp to Field Marshal Sir Douglas Haig, serving in France.

Upon the death of his elder half-brother on 19 September 1934, he succeeded to the family titles and estates.

== Personal life ==
On 19 August 1918, he married Beatrix Beresford, Dowager Marchioness of Waterford, GBE, DStJ (25 March 1877 – 5 August 1953) daughter of Henry Petty-FitzMaurice, 5th Marquess of Lansdowne and widow of Henry Beresford, 6th Marquess of Waterford.

He succeeded his half-brother in the family titles in 1934.

In his late eighties, St Albans spent a month travelling throughout America on a Greyhound unlimited travel pass.

He died in 1964, aged 89 without children, when the titles devolved upon his second cousin, Charles St Albans who succeeded as the 13th Duke.

== See also ==
- Duke of St Albans
- Osborne baronets

Peerage of England
Preceded by Charles Beauclerk	Duke of St Albans; 1934–1964	Succeeded by Charles Beauclerk
