= William Beauclerk, 10th Duke of St Albans =

British Liberal parliamentarian

His Grace The Duke of St Albans PC DL
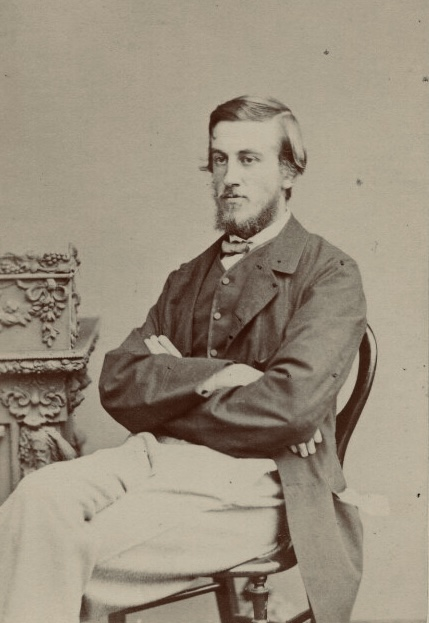
- The Duke of St Albans, c. 1863

Captain of the Yeomen of the Guard
- In office 22 December 1868 – 17 February 1874
- Monarch: Victoria
- Prime Minister: William Ewart Gladstone
- Preceded by: The Earl Cadogan
- Succeeded by: The Lord Skelmersdale

Personal details
- Born: 15 April 1840
- Died: 10 May 1898 (aged 58)
- Party: Liberal
- Spouse(s): (1) Lady Sybil Grey (1848–1871) (2) Grace Bernal-Osborne (1849–1926)
- Children: 8, including Charles and Osborne
- Parent(s): William Beauclerk, 9th Duke of St Albans; Elizabeth Catherine Gubbins

William Amelius Aubrey de Vere Beauclerk, 10th Duke of St Albans, PC DL (15 April 1840 – 10 May 1898), styled Earl of Burford until 1849, was a British Liberal parliamentarian of the Victorian era.

The Duke served in William Gladstone's government as Captain of the Yeomen of the Guard between 1868 and 1874.

== Background ==
St Albans was the only son of William Beauclerk, 9th Duke of St Albans, and Elizabeth Catherine, daughter of Major General Joseph Gubbins and his wife, Elizabeth (née Bathoe). Maj. Gen. Gubbins was one of the most senior British officers to be posted in New Brunswick, Canada, from 1810 to 1816.

On 13 June 1863, he was appointed Honorary Colonel of the 1st Nottinghamshire (Robin Hood) Rifle Volunteer Corps.

In 1865 he was cited as co-respondent in the Broadwood v Broadwood divorce case. It was accepted that he had committed adultery with Mrs Broadwood but it was shown that she kept a string of other lovers, whilst her husband attended court with his own lover.

== Political career ==
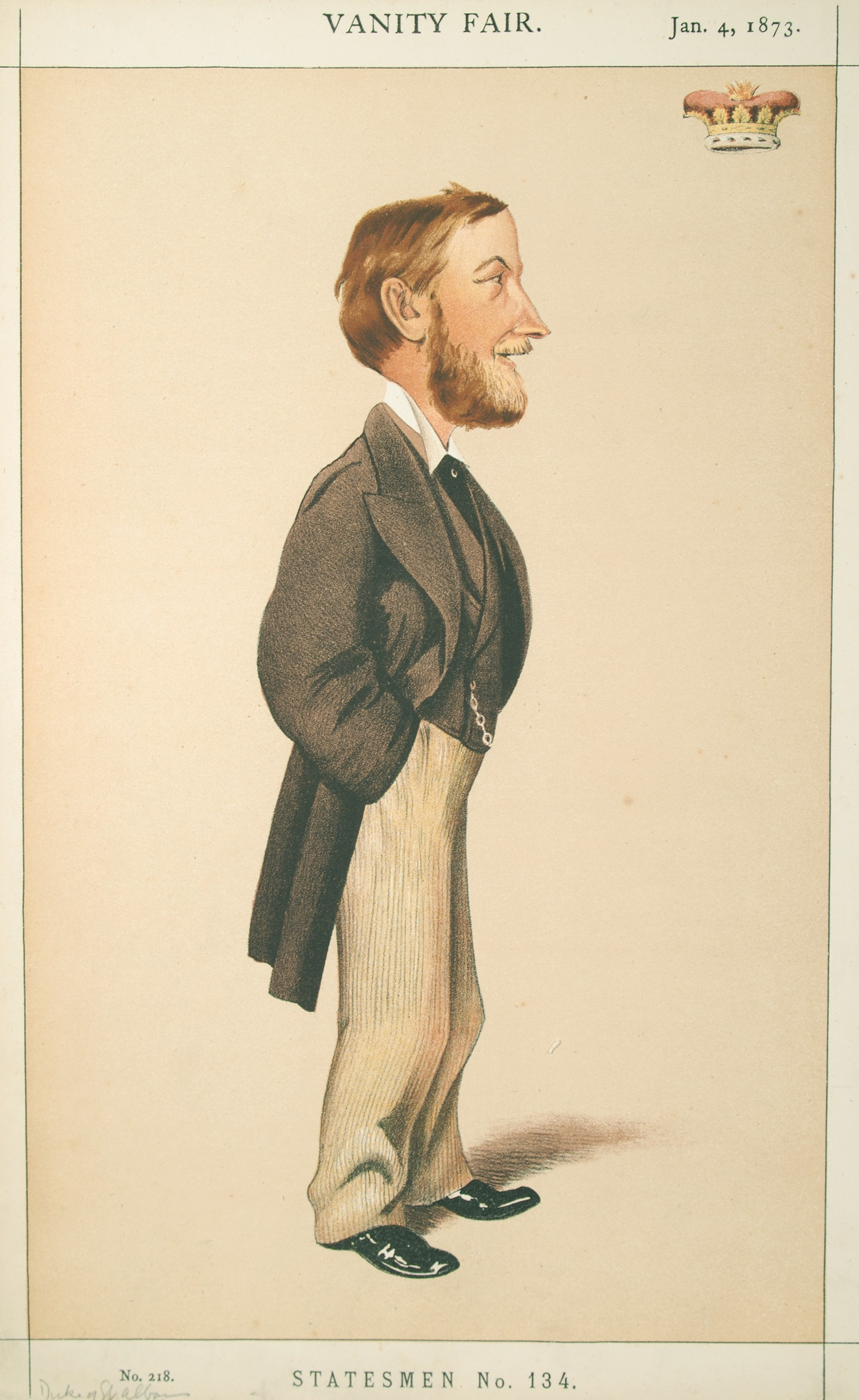
1873 caricature, by Melchiorre Delfico, of the Duke of St Albans

St Albans succeeded his father in the dukedom in 1849, aged nine. He later took his seat on the Liberal benches in the House of Lords and served as Captain of the Yeomen of the Guard from 1868 to 1874 in William Ewart Gladstone's first administration. In 1869 he was sworn of the Privy Council, but never returned to active political office, although he accepted appointment as Lord-Lieutenant of Nottinghamshire serving between 1880 and 1898.

== Family ==
St Albans married twice, first to Sybil Mary Grey (28 November 1848 – 7 September 1871, London), daughter of Lt.-Gen. Sir Charles Grey and granddaughter of Charles, 2nd Earl Grey, on 20 June 1867 in London. They had three children:

- Lady Louise de Vere Beauclerk (12 April 1869 – 15 December 1958), married Gerald Loder, 1st Baron Wakehurst and had issue.
- Charles Victor Albert Aubrey de Vere Beauclerk, 11th Duke of St Albans (1870–1934)
- Lady Sybil Evelyn de Vere Beauclerk (21 August 1871 – 20 September 1910), married Major William Lascelles, great-grandson of Henry Lascelles, 2nd Earl of Harewood and had issue.

After the early death of his first wife, he married Grace Bernal-Osborne (26 July 1848, Newtown Anner, Tipperary – 18 November 1926, London), on 3 January 1874 in County Tipperary. She was the granddaughter of London Sephardic Jewish Shakespearian actor turned parliamentarian Ralph Bernal. Her father Ralph Bernal Jr., later Ralph Bernal Osborne, was Secretary of the Admiralty and a parliamentarian. Grace's mother was an Catherine Isabella Osborne, an Anglo-Irish landed family;

Arms of the Dukes of St Albans

The Duke's second marriage produced five children:

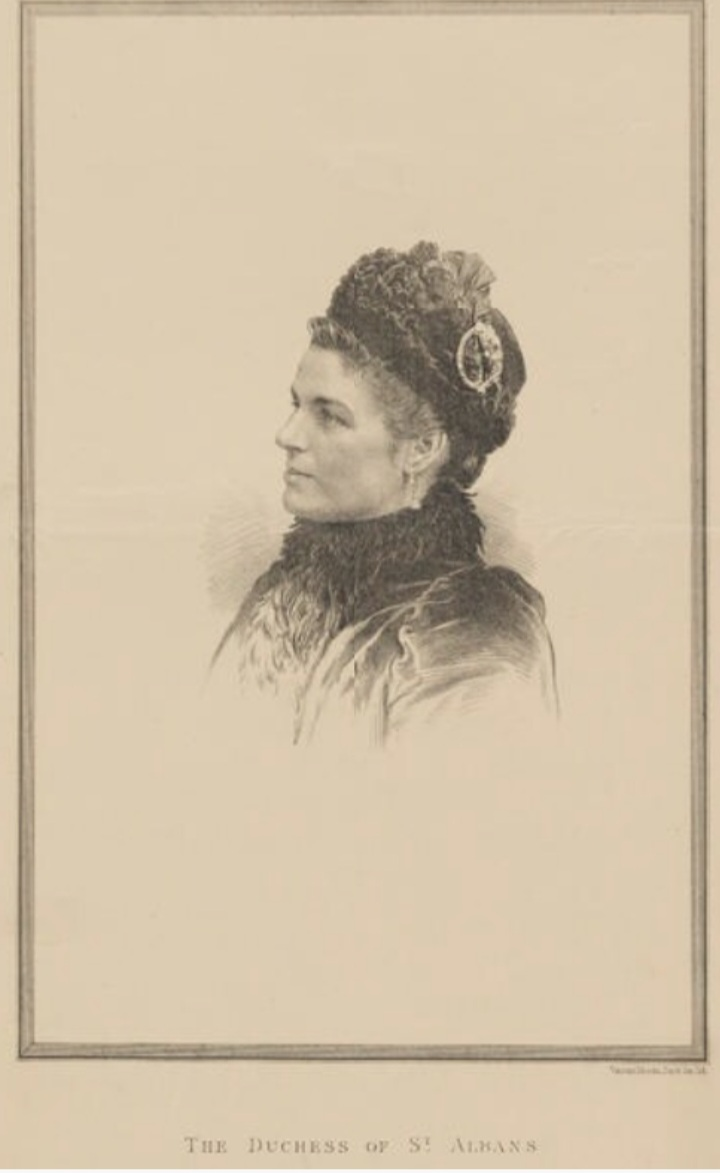
Grace (née Bernal Osborne), Duchess of St Albans, 1885

- Osborne de Vere Beauclerk, 12th Duke of St Albans (1874–1964)
- Lady Moyra de Vere Beauclerk (20 January 1876 – 7 February 1942), married Lord Richard Cavendish, grandson of William Cavendish, 7th Duke of Devonshire and had issue. She was one of the guests at the Devonshire House Ball of 1897.
- Lady Katherine de Vere Beauclerk (25 May 1877 – 1 February 1958), married, firstly, Henry Somerset, grandson of Henry Somerset, 8th Duke of Beaufort and secondly, Major-General Sir William Lambton, son of George Lambton, 2nd Earl of Durham.
- Lady Alexandra de Vere Beauclerk (5 July 1878 – 16 April 1935), died unmarried.
- Lord William Huddlestone de Vere Beauclerk (16 August 1883 – 25 December 1954), died unmarried.

The Duke of St Albans died in May 1898, aged 58, and was succeeded in the dukedom by the only son from his first marriage, Charles, who in turn was succeeded by his younger half-brother Osborne.

He owned a total of 9,000 acres in Lincolnshire and Nottinghamshire.

== See also ==
- The Dukeries

Political offices
| Preceded by The Earl Cadogan | Captain of the Yeomen of the Guard; 1868–1874 | Succeeded by The Lord Skelmersdale |
Honorary titles
| Preceded by The Lord Belper | Lord Lieutenant of Nottinghamshire; 1880–1898 | Succeeded by The Duke of Portland |
Peerage of England
| Preceded by William Beauclerk | Duke of St Albans; 1849–1898 | Succeeded by Charles Beauclerk |
