= Diana de Vere Beauclerk =

English author

Diana de Vere Beauclerk, Lady Huddleston
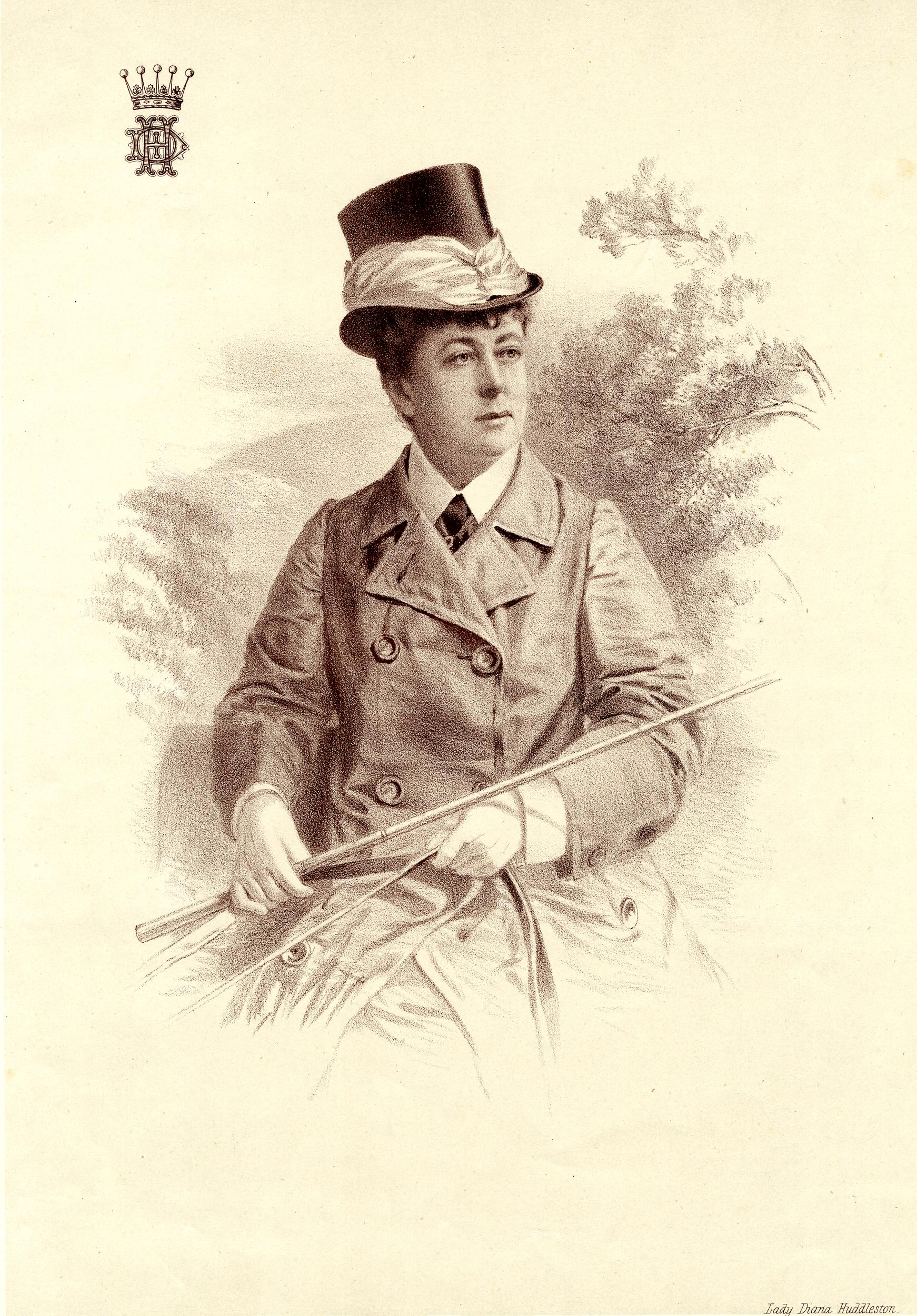
- Born: December 10, 1842
- Died: April 1, 1905 (aged 62)
- Occupations: Writer, member of the aristocracy
- Writing career
- Pen name: Lady Di Beauclerk
- Language: English

Diana de Vere Beauclerk, Lady Huddleston (10 December 1842 – 1 April 1905) was an English writer. She wrote Summer and Winter in Norway (1868) and True Love (1869) under the name Lady Di Beauclerk.

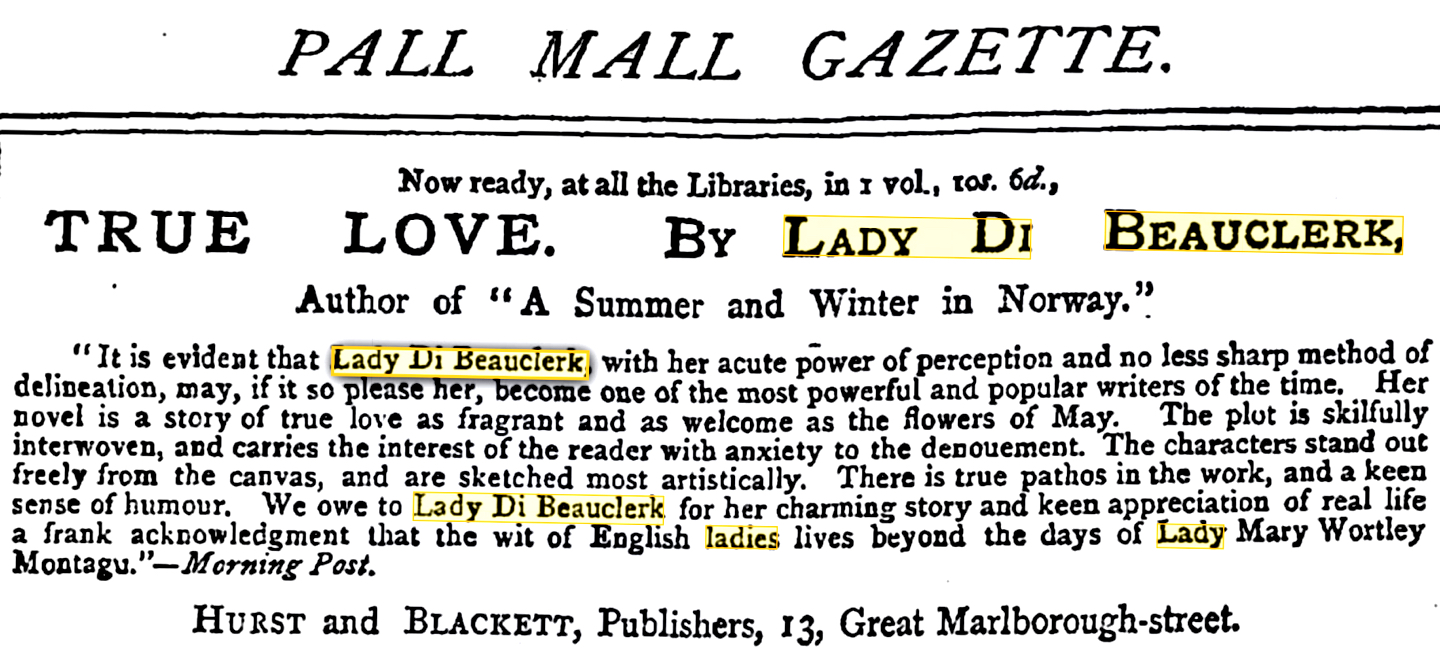
Advertisement in The Pall Mall Gazette for second book by Lady Di Beauclerk, 12 May 1869

== Life ==
Lady Diana de Vere Beauclerk was born on 10 December 1842 in London, the daughter of William Beauclerk, 9th Duke of St Albans and Elizabeth Catherine Gubbins. In 1863, Diana Beauclerk was one of Queen Alexandra's eight bridesmaids.

She married Sir John Walter Huddleston in 1872. The night before the wedding ceremony, Bishop Samuel Wilberforce, who would conduct the service, wrote in his diary: "To All Saints', Knightsbridge, to marry Lady Di." From then on she used the name Lady Diana Huddleston, but she was familiarly known as "The Beautiful Lady Di" or "Lady Di".

Lady Diana was well known in Norwich and, together with her mother, worked for Huddleston in his successful campaign there in the Parliamentary election of 1874. She frequently sat on the bench alongside Huddleston during trials, as she had done during the infamous case of Whistler v. Ruskin.

Sir John Walter Huddleston died on 5 September 1890, with an expressed wish that he be buried with his wife.

She never recovered from the loss of her husband in 1890, and everywhere she went the ashes of the Baron, who was cremated at Woking, accompanied her. The small bronze urn containing them always rested on a table beside her bed.

Lady Diana Huddleston died on 1 April 1905 in London. She was cremated and her ashes were buried alongside those of her husband. They had no children and she bequeathed a large sum of money to her servants.

== Books ==
Lady Di Beauclerk was the author of Summer and Winter in Norway (1868) and True Love (1869). She, her mother, and their maid Teresina left behind all luxuries to travel through Norway in the summer and winter of 1867. The following year her travelogue Summer and Winter in Norway was published. It was reviewed favourably by The Pall Mall Gazette, which characterized it as a straightforward narrative which did not attempt to function as a guidebook.

The Morning Post praised True Love's humour and characters, opining that "Lady Di Beauclerk, with her acute power of perception and no less sharp method of delineation, may, if it so please her, become one of the most powerful and popular writers of the time." However, the Saturday Review called the novel "commonplace and dull", saying "the person who can write a pleasant book of travels is not always able to follow suit with a novel, and the kudos got by the one venture is not unfrequently lost in the other."
