= James Coutts (MP) =

British Member of Parliament (1733–1778)

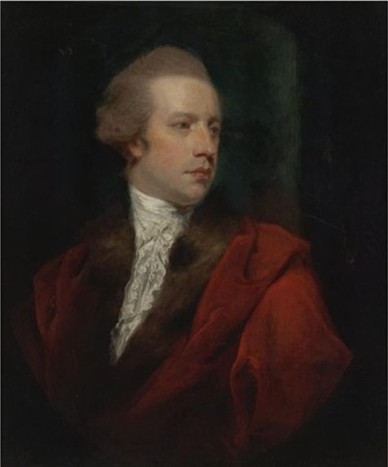

Member of Parliament for Edinburgh
- In office 1762–1768
- Preceded by: George Lind
- Succeeded by: Sir Lawrence Dundas

Personal details
- Born: 10 March 1733 Edinburgh, Scotland
- Died: 15 February 1778 (aged 44) Gibraltar
- Spouse: Mary Peagrum (after 1755)
- Relations: Thomas Coutts (brother)
- Children: Frances Coutts
- Parent(s): Jean Steuart Coutts; John Coutts
- Education: Royal High School, Edinburgh

James Coutts (10 March 1733 – 15 February 1778) was a Scottish politician, merchant and founder of the Coutts & Co. bank.

== Early life ==
Coutts was born in Edinburgh, Scotland on 10 March 1733. He was the third son of Jean Steuart and John Coutts, the former Lord Provost of Edinburgh. Among his siblings were Patrick Coutts; John Coutts; Thomas Coutts and Steuart Coutts, and one sister, Margaret Coutts.

His maternal grandfather was Sir John Steuart, 2nd Baronet of Allanbank (son of Sir Robert Steuart, 1st Baronet and Jean Gilmour, a daughter of Sir John Gilmour). His great-uncle was Archibald Stewart, the Lord Provost of Edinburgh.

Coutts was educated at the Royal High School, Edinburgh.

== Career ==
On his marriage, Coutts was taken into partnership by his wife's uncle, George Campbell, head of the Whig bank in the Strand who counted John Stuart, 3rd Earl of Bute as a customer. Upon Campbell's death in 1761, James took his brother Thomas into partnership with him. Lord Bute, as privy purse to George III, placed the royal account at Coutts' bank. In 1762, Coutts received an allotment of £76,000.

On 27 February 1762 by-election, as a supporter of Lord Bute (who became Prime Minister of Great Britain in May 1762), Coutts was elected to replace George Lind as the Scottish representative for Edinburgh in the Parliament of Great Britain. Coutts supported the Grenville Administration, Bute's successor, on Wilkes and general warrants. On 19 March 1764, when speaking on a motion to regulate Scottish banks, his language in the House was sometimes "strange and incoherent". In response, his friends sent him an anonymous letter, a draft of which is preserved in the papers of Caleb Whitefoord.

"I am going to offer you my advice on a delicate point, I mean speaking in the House ... It was with great concern that I saw you rise up to speak several times during the last session—the first time you spoke it was in some degree necessary—Would to Heaven you had stopped there, for indeed my dear Sir you are by no means qualified for speaking ... If you regard your own peace and quiet, if you regard your political interest, if you regard the opinion of many eminent and worthy persons you will give up all thought of speaking in the House ... The fair character you bore with everybody and your very becoming deportment in business and in every other situation of life made me feel the most sensible concern to see you appear so unlike yourself."

"After the letter, Coutts continued to attend the House and its committees, but there is no record of any further speech by him." In 1768, he was succeeded by the Whig member Sir Lawrence Dundas.

=== Later life ===
In 1774, on the expiration of their 12 years partnership agreement, his brother Thomas took steps to protect the bank's credit from James' perceived "irresponsible actions." Lord Bute, Stuart Mackenzie, Sir John Pringle and family friends signed a declaration that James was "an improper person to be connected with such a business" and he was forced to accept a financial settlement which he bitterly protested. In June 1775, however, he was forced to cut ties with the bank.

Coutts went abroad in July 1775 and, again, in November 1776. Between 1777 and 1778, he became so violent in Turin that he had to be kept under military guard. His keepers sent him home aboard a ship but he died, while in confinement, at Gibraltar on 15 February 1778.

== Personal life ==
In April 1755 Coutts was married to heiress Mary "Polly" Peagrum at St George's Hanover Square Church in London. Polly, a daughter of Elizabeth (née Campbell) Peagrum and John Peagrum of Elmstead, was the niece and heiress of London banker George Campbell. She was also the niece of John Campbell, 1st Earl of Breadalbane and Holland, the granddaughter Sir John Campbell of Glen Orchy and the great-granddaughter of William Graham, 1st Earl of Airth. Together, they were the parents of:

- Frances Coutts (d. 1809), who married Sir John Steuart of Allanbank, 4th Baronet (1754–1817).

Coutts died on 15 February 1778 at Gibraltar on his forced way back to England.

=== Descendants ===
Through his only child Frances, he was a grandfather of Sir John James Stuart, 5th Baronet of Allanbank, who married twice, but had no children by either marriage, therefore, the baronetcy ended with his death in 1849. Wrong before James died in 1776 he married again in secret to Isabell Low 21 May 1770 in Dundee, Angus, Scotland and had a son that he named James James Coutts that was born 9 Sept 1776 and christening was 12 Sept 1776 at Edinburgh Parish, Edinburgh, Midlothian, Scotland and James with 2nd wife were there see Isabel Low in entry is Scotland Marriages, 1561-1910”.

Parliament of Great Britain
Preceded by George Lind	Member of Parliament for Edinburgh; 1762–1768	Succeeded by Sir Lawrence Dundas
