= Nelthorpe baronets =

Extinct baronetcy in the Baronetage of England

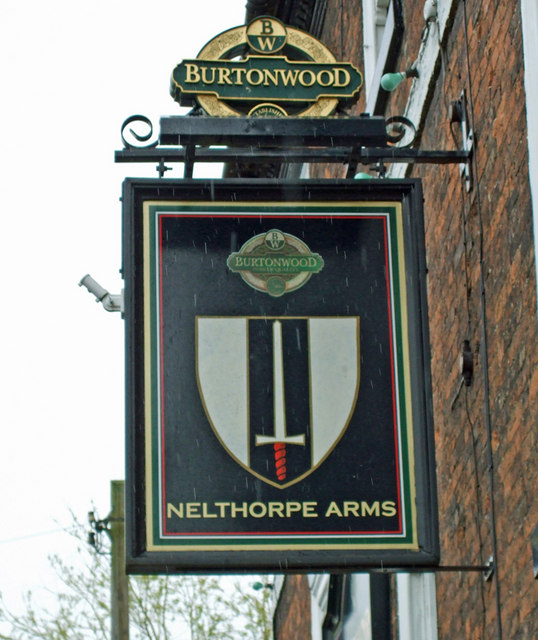
The Nelthorpe Arms, Brigg

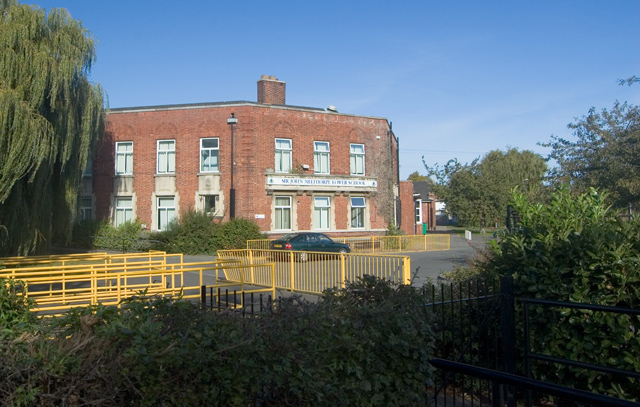
Sir John Nelthorpe Lower School, Brigg

The Nelthorpe baronetcy, of Grays Inn in the City of London, was a title in the baronetage of England. It was created on 10 May 1666 for John Nelthorpe. The fifth baronet was High Sheriff of Lincolnshire in 1741, the sixth baronet High Sheriff in 1767, the seventh baronet in 1800 and the eighth baronet in 1842. The title became extinct on the death of the last in 1865.

The family seat was Scawby Hall, Scawby, Lincolnshire.

== Nelthorpe baronets, of Grays Inn (1666) ==
Escutcheon of the Nelthorpe baronets

- Sir John Nelthorpe, 1st Baronet (1614–1669)
- Sir Goddard Nelthorpe, 2nd Baronet (c. 1630–1704)Nephew of the 1st Baronet
- Sir Montagu Nelthorpe, 3rd Baronet (1661–1722)
- Sir Henry Nelthorpe, 4th Baronet (c. 1717–1729)
- Sir Henry Nelthorpe, 5th Baronet (1697–1746) (brother of the 3rd Baronet)
- Sir John Nelthorpe, 6th Baronet (1746–1799)
- Sir Henry Nelthorpe, 7th Baronet (1773–1830)
- Sir John Nelthorpe, 8th Baronet (1814–1865)
