= Lord Amelius Beauclerk =

British Admiral (1771–1846)

Admiral Lord Amelius Beauclerk GCB GCH FRS
- Admiral Lord Amelius Beauclerk, 1771–1846, by C J Robertson, engraved by S Watts
- Born: 23 May 1771
- Died: 10 December 1846 (aged 75) Winchfield House, near Farnborough, Hampshire
- Allegiance: United Kingdom
- Branch: Royal Navy
- Service years: 1782–1846
- Rank: Admiral
- Commands: HMS Nemesis; HMS Juno; HMS Dryad; HMS Fortunée; HMS Majestic; HMS Saturn; HMS Royal Oak; Commander-in-Chief at Lisbon; Commander-in-Chief at Plymouth
- Conflicts: Napoleonic Wars
- Awards: Colonel of Marines; Knight Grand Cross of the Order of the Bath; Knight Grand Cross of the Royal Guelphic Order; Fellow of the Royal Society

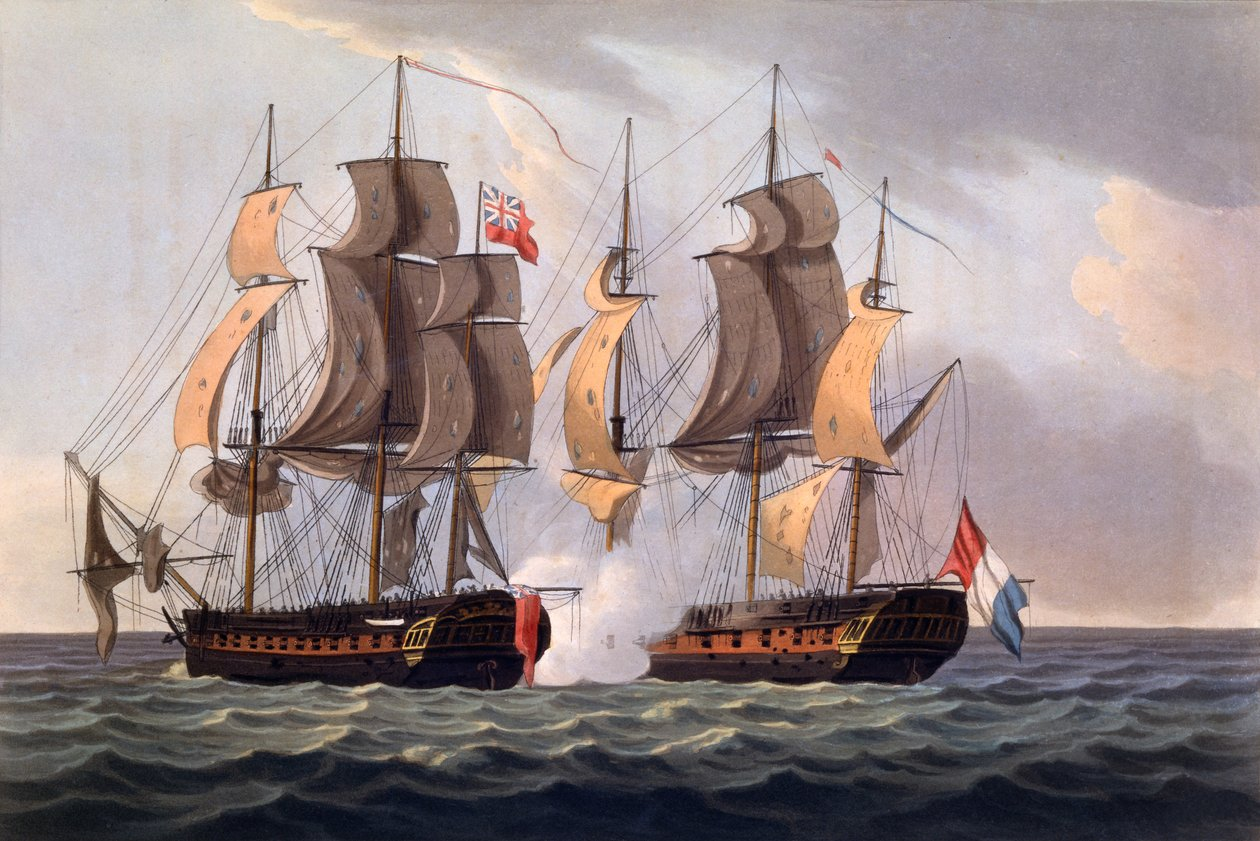
Dryad captures Proserpine, by Thomas Whitcombe.

Admiral Lord Amelius Beauclerk GCB GCH FRS (23 May 1771 – 10 December 1846) was a Royal Navy officer.

== Early life ==
Beauclerk was born on 23 May 1771, the third son of Aubrey Beauclerk, 5th Duke of St Albans (1740–1802) and his wife, the former Lady Catherine Ponsonby (1742–1789), daughter of William Ponsonby, 2nd Earl of Bessborough. He was baptised at St Marylebone Parish Church, London on 15 June 1771.

He was entered on the books of the cutter Jackal in June 1782, and in 1783 was appointed to Salisbury, bearing the flag of Vice-Admiral John Campbell on the Newfoundland Station. Afterward, he served in the West Indies under Commodore Gardner and returned to England in 1789 as acting Lieutenant of Europa. He was not confirmed as a Lieutenant until 21 September 1790, at the time of the Great Spanish Armament crisis.

== Promotion to captain ==
In 1792, he went to the Mediterranean in the frigate Druid. Then on 16 September 1793, he was made captain by Lord Hood and appointed to the command of Nemesis (28 guns). In March 1794, he was transferred to Juno (32 guns), and attached to the squadron under Admiral Hotham, blockading Toulon. Juno took part in the action of 14 March 1795, which resulted in the capture of the French ships Ça Ira and Censeur. This was one of the squadrons, under Commodore Taylor, which convoyed the homeward trade in the following autumn, when the French recaptured the Censeur off Cape St Vincent on 7 October 1796.

== Frigate commands ==
On his return to England, Lord Amelius was appointed to the frigate Dryad, which had 44 guns and 251 men. In the south of Cape Clear, Ireland, during the action on 13 June 1796, he captured the Proserpine, a ship with 42 guns and 348 men. The Dryad lost only two killed and seven wounded, while Proserpine lost thirty killed and forty-five wounded. He also captured several privateers. In 1800, he was appointed to Fortunée (40 guns), employed in the Channel, and in attendance on the King at Weymouth.

== Ship-of-the-line commands ==
Over the next ten years, he commanded HM Ships Majestic, Saturn, and Royal Oak (all 74 guns) in the English Channel. In 1809, he was in charge of the amphibious landing of Lord Chatham's army at Walcheren. During the operations on that coast, he served as second-in-command under Sir Richard Strachan.

== Admiral ==
On 1 August 1811, he was promoted to rear-admiral. However, during that and the two following years, he continued in the North Sea, stretching in 1813 as far as the North Cape in command of a small squadron on the look-out for the American Commodore Rogers. In 1814, he commanded in the Basque Roads and conducted the negotiations for the local suspension of hostilities. On 12 August 1819, he was advanced to vice-admiral, and from 1824 to 1827 was Commander-in-Chief at Lisbon and on the coast of Portugal. He became a full admiral on 22 July 1830, and was Commander-in-Chief, Plymouth from 1836 to 1839.

Beauclerk was a fine professional officer who benefited from his family connections to secure early promotion. Port Beauclerc, Point Amelius, Point St. Albans, Beauclerc Island, Beauclerc Peak, and Amelius Island, all in Alaska, are named for him.

He died, unmarried, at his seat, Winchfield House, near Farnborough, Hampshire, on 10 December 1846.

== Honours and achievements ==
Beauclerk became a Fellow of the Royal Society in 1809, and was given the honorary rank of Colonel of Marines on 31 July 1810. He was appointed to the KCB on 2 January 1815, GCH on 29 March 1831, GCB on 4 August 1835, and First and Principal Naval Aide-de-Camp to King William IV on 4 August 1839. He was also the hereditary Lord of the manor of Winchfield, Hampshire.

== See also ==
- O'Byrne, William Richard. "Beauclerk, Amelius". [[s:|]] – via Wikisource.

Military offices
| Preceded by Sir William Hargood | Commander-in-Chief, Plymouth; 1836–1839 | Succeeded by Sir Graham Moore |
Honorary titles
| Preceded by New office | First and Principal Naval Aide-de-Camp; 1830–1846 | Succeeded by Sir William Parker, Bt. |
