= Drummond (surname) =

Drummond is a Scottish surname and clan name, but also occurring in Portugal (mainly in Azores, where also occur as Ormonde) and Brazil.

In Scotland, the first born with the surname was Malcolm (b. ?, d. 1131), son of Maurice, Prince of Hungary, appointed hereditary seneschal of Lennox by King Malcolm III of Scotland, with the right to use the Drummond surname.

In Portugal, the surname arrived with Sir John Drummond, son of Sir John Drummond of Carghill and Stobhall, who left Scotland in 1418, set off for France and from there to the kingdom of Granada (Spain) to fight against the moors, and finally he set off for the island of Madeira (Portugal). Later, Francisco Ferreira Drummond (b. Madeira, 1580, d. Azores, 1615) migrated to the island of Terceira in the Azores archipelago (Portugal), where he established his residence in Ribeira Seca, part of the town of São Sebastião. From this date onwards, the surname Drummond undergoes various corruptions, such as 'Armond', 'de Ormonde', 'Ormonde', and 'Ormond' (only in Brazil).

== Notable people with the surname ==
- Adam Drummond (politician) (1713–1786), Scottish merchant, banker and British Member of Parliament
- Adam Humphrey Drummond, 17th Baron Strange (born 1953), British Army major and Baron Strange in the English peerage
- Alice Drummond (1928–2016), American actress
- Andre Drummond (born 1993), American basketball player
- Andrew Drummond (disambiguation), including:
  - Andrew Drummond (artist) (born 1951), New Zealand painter and sculptor
  - Andrew Drummond (author), Scottish translator and novelist
  - Andrew Drummond (banker), Scottish founder of the Drummond Bank in Charing Cross, London
  - Andrew L. Drummond, chief of the United States Secret Service
- Bernadette Drummond, New Zealand professor of dentistry
- Bill Drummond (born 1953), South African-born Scottish musician, member of the British music duo The KLF
- Brian Drummond (born 1969), Canadian voice actor
- Carlos Drummond de Andrade (1902–1987), Brazilian poet
- Dan Drummond (1891–1949), Scottish footballer
- David Drummond (1593–1638), Colonel of Kalmar Regiment, Major-General in Swedish service
- David Drummond (minister) (1805–1877), Scottish minister and photographer
- David Drummond (physician) (1852–1932), Irish/British physician and academic
- David Drummond (politician) (1890–1965), member of the New South Wales Legislative Assembly in 1920
- David Drummond, 8th Earl of Perth (1907–2002), Scottish peer, banker, and politician
- David Drummond (born 1963), American Chief Legal Officer of Alphabet, Inc.
- Dean Drummond (1949–2013), American composer and musician
- Des Drummond (1958–2022), Jamaican-born English rugby league footballer
- Don Drummond (1932–1969), Jamaican trombonist and member of The Skatalites
- Dontario Drummond (born 1997), American football player
- Dugald Drummond (1840–1912), Scottish locomotive engineer, latterly of the London & South Western Railway
- Dylan Drummond (born 2000), American football player
- Eddie Drummond (born 1980), American football player
- Edward Drummond (1792–1843), British civil servant who was Personal Secretary to Sir Robert Peel and was fatally shot by Daniel McNaughton in 1843
- Flick Drummond (born 1962), British politician
- Flora Drummond (1878–1949), British suffragette
- Francis Drummond (1798–1827), Argentine naval officer
- Francisco Ferreira Drummond (1796–1858), historian, palaeograph, musician, and politician of the Azores
- Gentner Drummond (born 1963), American politician
- Gordon Drummond (1772–1852), British army general
- Gordon Drummond (cricketer) (born 1980), Scottish cricket player
- Grace Marguerite Hay Drummond-Hay (1895–1946), British journalist and aviation pioneer
- Harriet Drummond (born 1952), American politician
- Henry Drummond (disambiguation)
  - Henry Drummond (1730–1795), British Member of Parliament for Midhurst
  - Henry Drummond (1762–1794), British Member of Parliament for Castle Rising
  - Henry Drummond (1786–1860), English banker, Member of Parliament for West Surrey, writer and Irvingite
  - Henry Drummond (evangelist) (1851–1897), Scottish evangelist, writer and lecturer
- Isabelle Drummond (born 1994), Brazilian actress
- Sir Jack Drummond (1891–1952), British biochemist and nutritionist, responsible for nutrition during World War II rationing
- James Drummond (disambiguation), including:
  - James Drummond (artist) (1816–1877), Scottish-born artist
  - James Drummond (Australian politician) (1814–1873), member of the Western Australian Legislative Council (1870–73)
  - James Drummond (bishop) (1629–1695), Bishop of Brechin
  - James Drummond (botanist) (ca. 1786–1863), Scottish-born botanist and naturalist, early settler in Western Australia
  - James Drummond (chaplain) (died 1699), Scottish chaplain
  - James Eric Drummond, 16th Earl of Perth (1876–1951), British diplomat, first secretary-general of the League of Nations
  - James Lawson Drummond (1783–1853), Irish physician, naturalist and botanist
  - James Mackay Drummond (1869–1940), New Zealand journalist, naturalist and writer
  - James Ramsay Drummond (1851–1921), civil servant in India, and amateur botanist
  - James Robert Drummond (1812–1895), Scottish naval officer, captain of part of the Mediterranean Fleet during the Crimean War
  - James S. Drummond (died 1881), mayor of Victoria, British Columbia
- Jervis Drummond, (born 1976), Costa Rican footballer
- John Drummond (disambiguation), including:
  - John Drummond (settler of Madeira), of Carghill and Stobhall, Scotland, settler of Ilha da Madeira, Portugal.
  - John Drummond, 15th Baron Strange (1900–82), of Megginch Castle, Scotland, author, farmer, politician
  - John Drummond (arts administrator) (1934–2006), British arts administrator and BBC executive
  - John Drummond (Australian settler) (1816–1906), settler of Western Australia
- Johnston Drummond (1820–1845), early settler of Western Australia, botanical and zoological collector
- Jon Drummond (composer) (born 1969), Australian composer
- Jonathan "Jon" Drummond (born 1968), American athlete
- José Aurélio Drummond Jr. (born c. 1964), Brazilian businessman
- Joseph Drummond (1926–1975), Canadian civil rights activist
- Juan Bennett Drummond (1864–1926), African American physician
- Kate Drummond (born 1975), Canadian actress
- Kurtis Drummond (born 1992), American football player
- Lorna Drummond (born 1967), Scottish lawyer
- Luizinho Drummond (1940–2020), Brazilian illegal lottery operator
- Margaret Drummond (circa 1340 – after 1375), Queen of Scotland, and wife of David II
- May Drummond (1696/7–1777), Scottish Quaker minister
- Michael Frank Drummond (born 1948), British health economist
- Orlando Drummond (1919–2021), Brazilian actor and comedian
- Peter Drummond (disambiguation), including:
  - Peter Drummond (engineer) (1850–1918), Scottish locomotive superintendent
  - Peter Drummond (physicist), Australian physicist
  - Peter Drummond (politician) (1931–2013), Australian politician
  - Peter Drummond (RAF officer) (1894–1945), Australian-born commander in the Royal Air Force
  - Peter Robert Drummond (1802–1879), Scottish businessman and biographer
  - Peter Drummond (born 1969), former National Chairman of the Architectural Heritage Society of Scotland
  - Pete Drummond (born 1943), British voice artist and former BBC and pirate radio disc jockey and announcer
  - Pete Drummond (drummer), Australian drummer and composer
- Ralph Drummond (1792–1872), Presbyterian minister in South Australia
- Ray Drummond (1946–2025), American jazz bassist
- Ree Drummond (born 1969), American food writer
- Ron Drummond (born 1959), Scottish-American writer, editor, and scholar
- Roscoe Drummond (1902–1983), American journalist
- Rose Emma Drummond (c. 1790–1840), British portrait miniaturist
- Ross Drummond (born 1956), Scottish golfer
- Ross Drummond (footballer) (born 1994), Scottish footballer
- Ryan Drummond (born 1973), American voice actor
- Scott Drummond (born 1974), British golfer
- Thomas Drummond (disambiguation), including
  - Thomas Drummond (botanist) (1793–1835), Scottish botanical collector
  - Thomas Drummond (judge) (1809–1890), American judge
  - Thomas Drummond, Lord Drummond (1742–1780), Scottish landowner and diplomat
  - Tom Drummond (footballer) (1897–1970), Australian rules footballer
  - Tom Drummond (musician) (born 1969), American musician, bassist for Better Than Ezra
- Tim Drummond (1940–2015), American bassist and musician
- Vance Drummond (1927–1967), New Zealand-born Australian pilot in Korean and Vietnam Wars
- Victoria Drummond (1894–1978) (daughter of the 15th Baron Strange), first woman in the UK to qualify as a marine engineer
- Violet Hilda Drummond (1911–2000), British author and illustrator
- William Drummond (disambiguation), including:
  - William Drummond of Hawthornden (1585–1649), Scottish poet, aristocrat and friend of Ben Jonson
  - William Drummond, 1st Viscount Strathallan (1617–1688), Scottish soldier and politician
  - William Drummond, 4th Viscount Strathallan (1690–1746, Battle of Culloden), Major-General in the Jacobite cause, brother of Andrew Drummond

== Fictional characters ==
- Bulldog Drummond, British fictional detective
- Esther Drummond, character in Torchwood: Miracle Day
- Henry Drummond, fictional character from Inherit the Wind
- Pete Drummond, character in Humans
- Phillip and Kimberly Drummond, the father and daughter characters on Diff'rent Strokes
- Professor Phillip Drummond III, a fictitious name adapted by Borat in a Borat 2 scene.
