= Henry Drummond =

Henry Drummond may refer to:

- Henry Drummond (1730–1795), British member of parliament for Midhurst
- Henry Drummond (1762–1794), British member of parliament for Castle Rising
- Henry Drummond (1786–1860), English banker, member of parliament for West Surrey, writer and Irvingite
- Henry Drummond (evangelist) (1851–1897), Scottish evangelist, writer and lecturer
- Henry Drummond (fictional character), a character from Inherit the Wind
