= John Drummond (1723–1774) =

English banker and politician (1723–1774)

- Born: 1723
- Died: 1774 (aged 50–51)
- Occupation: Scottish banker

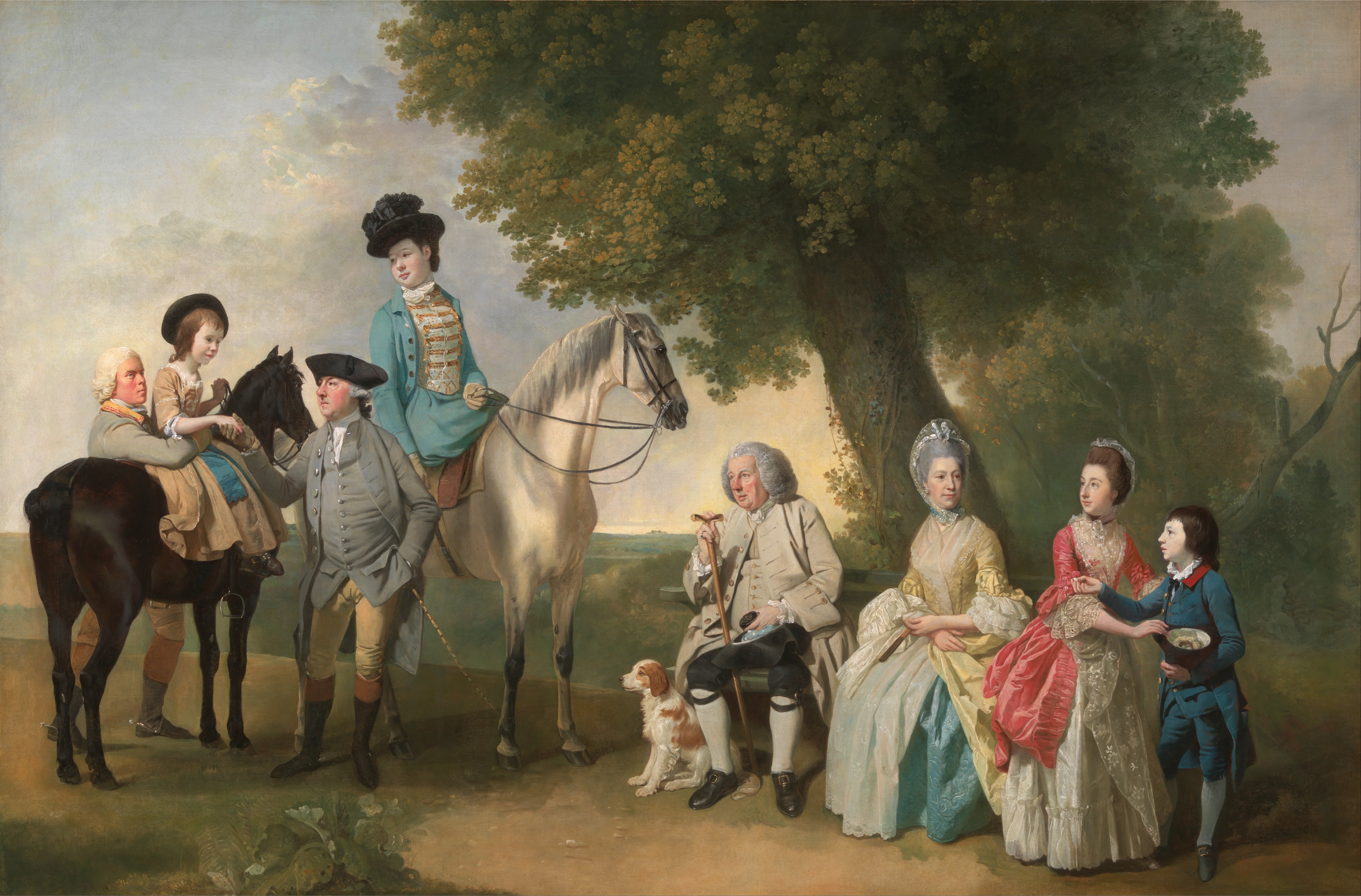
Drummond with his father (centre) and family Johan Zoffany c.1769

John Drummond (27 April 1723 – 25 July 1774) was a Scottish banker and politician.

He was descended from Clan Drummond of Machan in Perthshire. He was the oldest son of the banker Andrew Drummond (1688–1769), founder of Drummonds Bank that became part of the Bank of Scotland. His mother, Isabella, was the daughter of Alexander Strachan, a London-Scottish merchant. His father's elder brother was William Drummond, 4th Viscount Strathallan. He was a cousin of Henry Drummond. Drummond was educated at Westminster School, and joined his father's bank.

He was married to Charlotte, daughter of Lord William Beauclerk. Their children included Jane Diana, Charlotte, John and George (see painting).

He was the Member of Parliament (MP) for Thetford from 1768 until his death in 1774.

Parliament of Great Britain
Preceded by Henry Seymour Conway; Hon. Aubrey Beauclerk	Member of Parliament for Thetford; 1768 – 1774; With: Henry Seymour Conway	Succeeded by Henry Seymour Conway; Viscount Petersham
