= Peter Drummond =

Peter Drummond may refer to:

- Peter Drummond (engineer) (1850–1918), Scottish locomotive superintendent
- Peter Drummond (physicist), Australian physicist
- Peter Drummond (politician) (1931–2013), Australian politician
- Peter Drummond (RAF officer) (1894–1945), Australian-born commander in the Royal Air Force
- Peter Robert Drummond (1802–1879), Scottish businessman and biographer
- Pete Drummond (born 1943), British voice artist and former BBC and pirate radio disc jockey and announcer
- Pete Drummond (drummer), Australian drummer and composer
- Pete Drummond, character in Humans

== See also ==
- Peter Drummond-Burrell, 22nd Baron Willoughby de Eresby (1782–1865), British nobleman
- Peter Drummond-Murray of Mastrick (1929–2014), Scottish banker and authority on heraldry
