= Andrew Drummond =

Andrew Drummond may refer to:

- Andrew Drummond (artist), New Zealand painter and sculptor
- Andrew Drummond (author), Scottish translator and novelist
- Andrew Drummond (banker), Scottish founder of the Drummond Bank in Charing Cross, London
- Andrew L. Drummond, chief of the US Secret Service
