= St George's Church, Hanworth =

Coordinates: 51.435°N 0.401°W

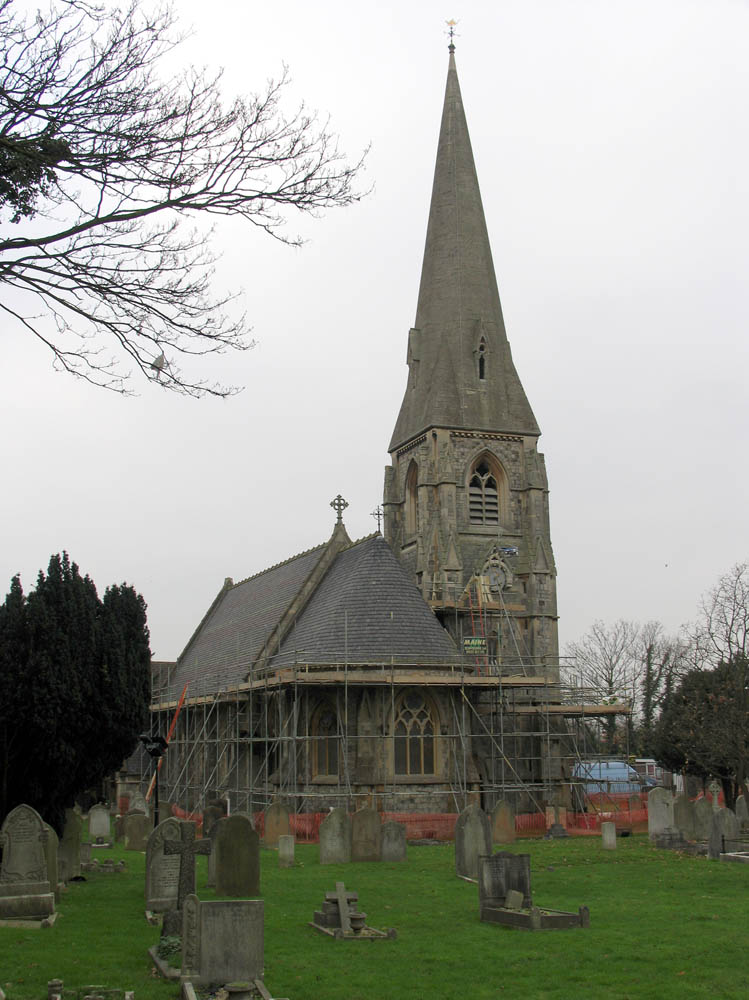
- St George's Church under restoration in 2004
- St George's Church, Hanworth
- OS grid reference: TQ 11250 71880
- Location: Hanworth, London
- Country: England
- Denomination: Church of England
- Churchmanship: Anglo-Catholic
- Website: www.achurchnearyou.com/church/6774/

History
- Status: Parish church

Architecture
- Functional status: Active
- Years built: 1865

Administration
- Diocese: Diocese of London
- Archdeaconry: Archdeaconry of Middlesex
- Deanery: Hounslow
- Parish: St George Hanworth

Clergy
- Bishop(s): Jonathan Baker, Bishop of Fulham (AEO)

Listed Building – Grade II*
- Designated: 14 August 1953
- Reference no.: 1189077

St George's Church, Hanworth, also known as Hanworth Parish Church, is a Church of England parish church located in Hanworth, London. Dedicated to Saint George, it has grade II* listed building status.

== History ==
There has been a church on the site, in Castle Way, since at least the 14th century; the church was first mentioned in 1293. The first known rector was Adam de Brome, founder of Oriel College, Oxford, in 1309.

According to Daniel Lysons, vicar in 1800, the church was made of flint and stone with a low wooden turret. As the parish advowson belonged to the lord of the manor, only the name of its rector, James Burgess, was mentioned.

The original church included stained glass windows of the coats of arms of the Crosby family, who owned the manor in 1471; the Killigrew family, lords of the manor in the latter part of the 16th century; and the Royal arms of 1625, incorporating the royal cypher JR. The latter window was moved to the rectory after the church's reconstruction in 1808, before moving to its present site in the Victoria and Albert Museum in 1975. Monarchs and their consorts who are known to have worshipped here are Henry VIII, Anne Boleyn, Catherine Parr and Elizabeth I.

Baron Cottington took further interest in Saint George's Church. He had his son Charles baptised here on 21 July 1628 in the presence of King Charles I, the Duke of Buckingham and Mary Feilding, wife of the Marquess of Hamilton. Cottington also gave the church its silver chalice and paten, which are still used today. Many times during the following century, its windows were damaged by explosions from the Hounslow Gunpowder Mills, situated about two miles away in Crane Park.

In 1807, it was decided that the entire edifice should be dismantled and rebuilt. The building of the new church was undertaken by James Wyatt, a notable architect of the time. Wyatt only just lived to see it completed in 1812, as he was killed in a carriage accident the following year. His family are buried in the churchyard, but Wyatt himself lies in Westminster Abbey.

Saint George's assumed its current form in 1865, when a local architect, Algernon Perkins, volunteered to redesign the church at his own expense. The spire, added at about this time, was designed by Samuel Sanders Teulon.

The lychgate, which forms the main entrance to the church, was built in 1882. It is said to be a copy of that at Beddington, South London, and was made in memory of the mother-in-law of John Lyndhurst Winslow, rector at the time.

Two former owners of Hanworth Park, Thomas Chambers and his son-in-law Aubrey Beauclerk, 5th Duke of St Albans, are buried at Saint George's Church. Chambers has a tablet in the north transept, and Beauclerk has a ledger stone in the chancel.

== Present day ==
From 1992 until 2019, Paul Williamson was priest-in-charge of St George's, and, from 25 April 2021 until 23 April 2024, Hanworth Parish Church was served under Michael Dobson as priest in charge and also assistant priest at St Mary’s Church Stanwell .

St George's Church adheres to the Anglo-Catholic tradition and, associated with Forward in Faith in not accepting the ordination of women, Hanworth Parish Church now receives alternative episcopal oversight from the Bishop of Fulham, Jonathan Baker.

== Gallery ==
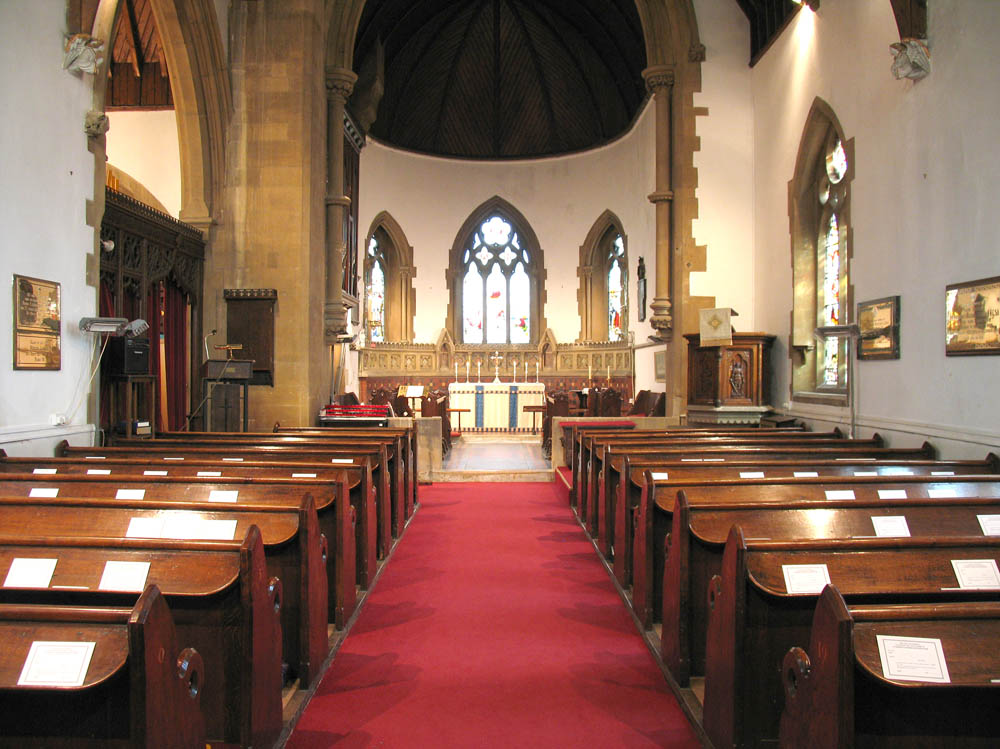
Nave

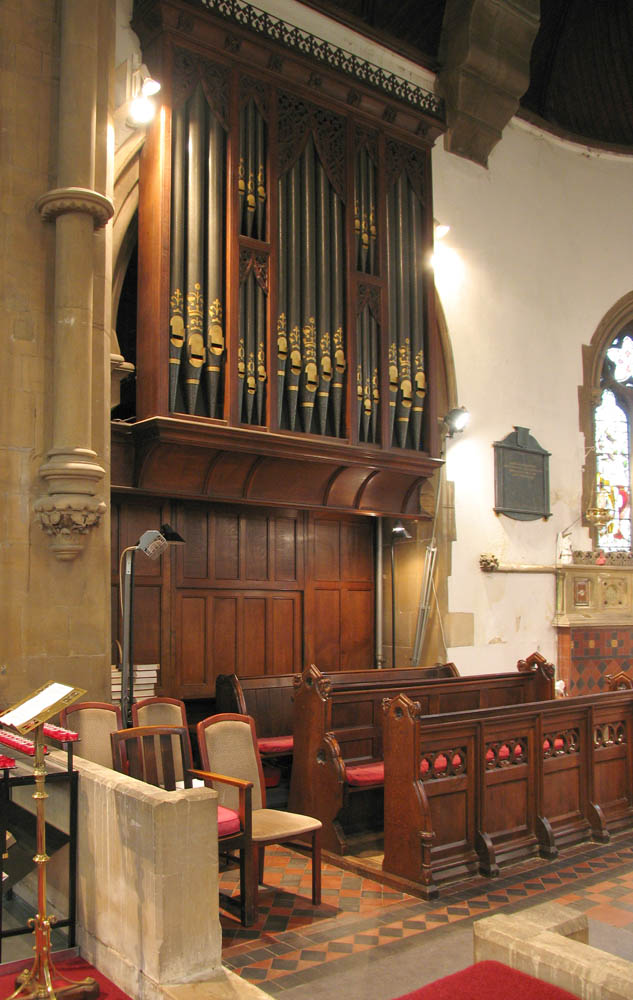
Organ

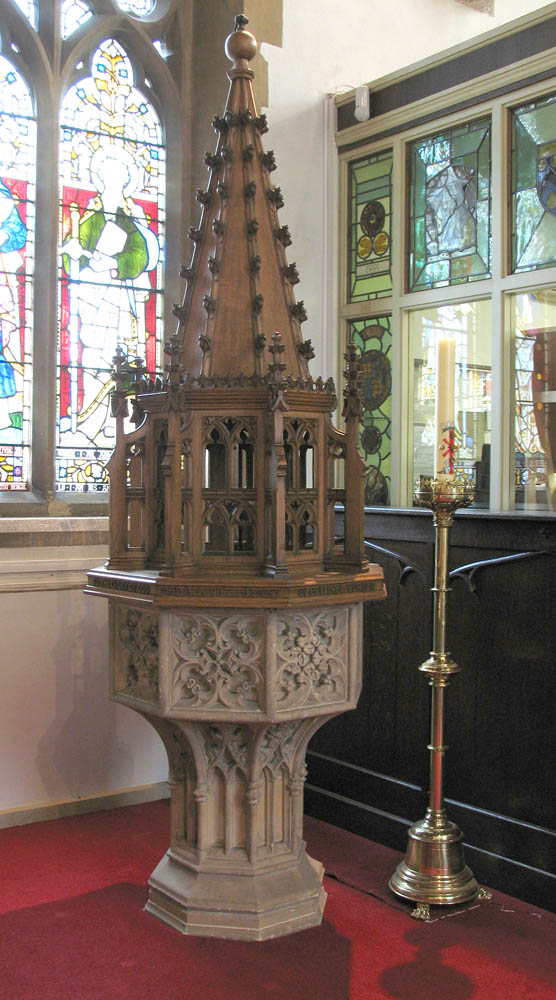
Font

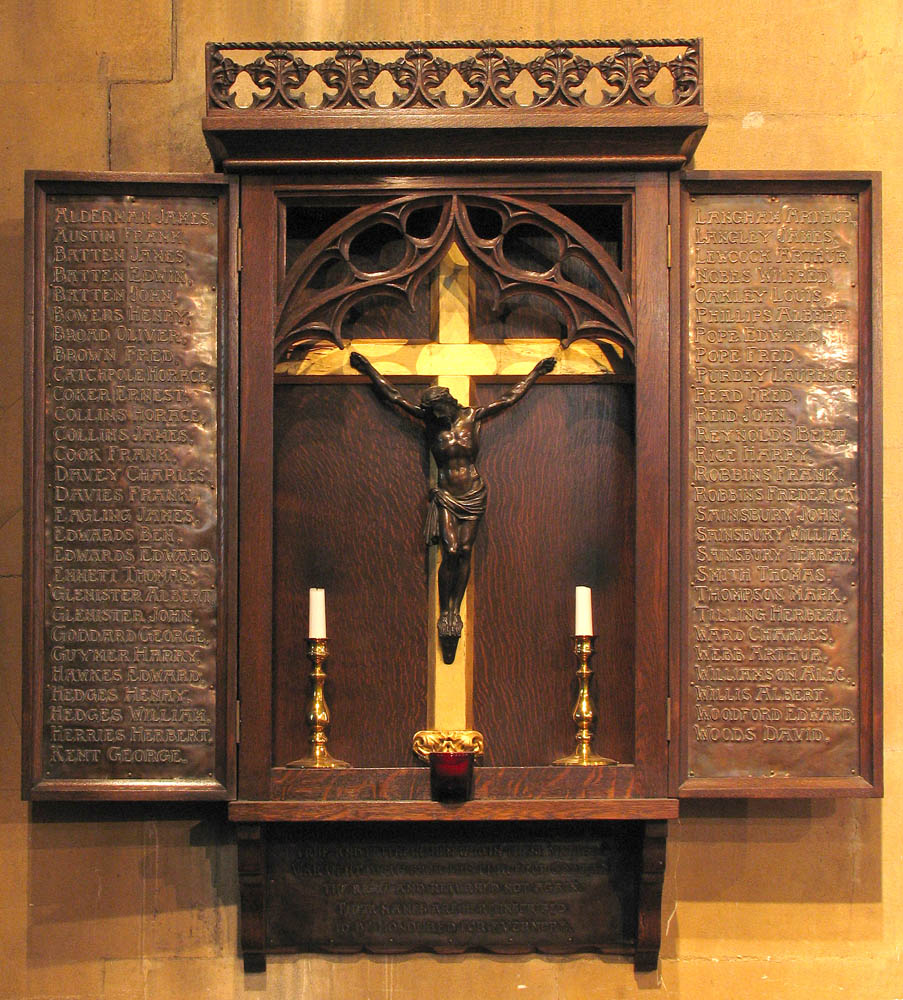
War memorial

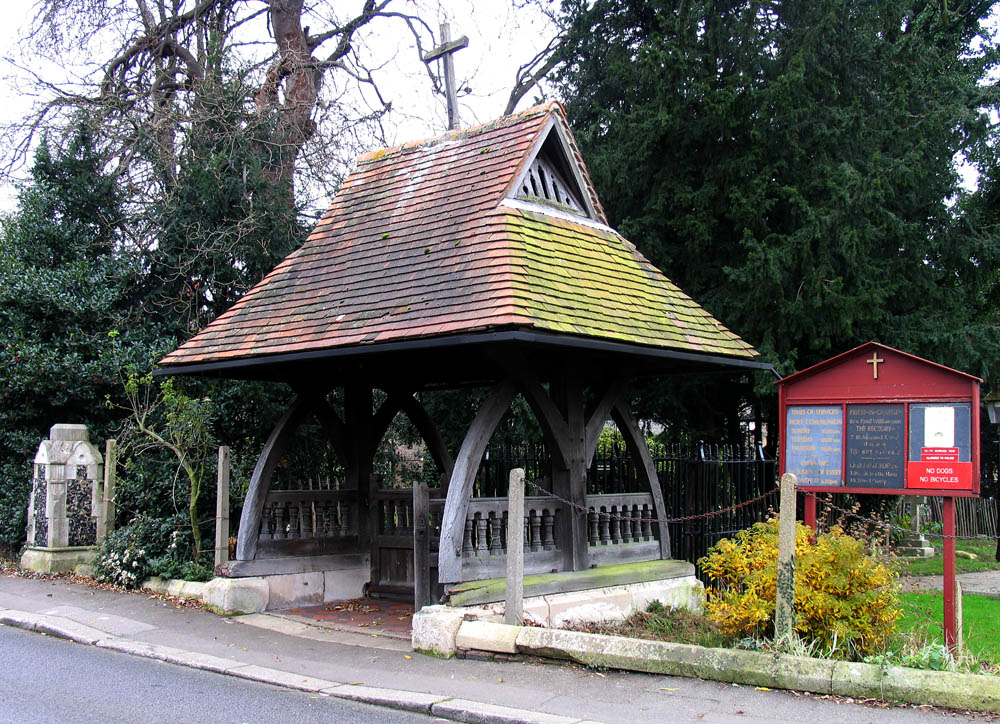
Lychgate

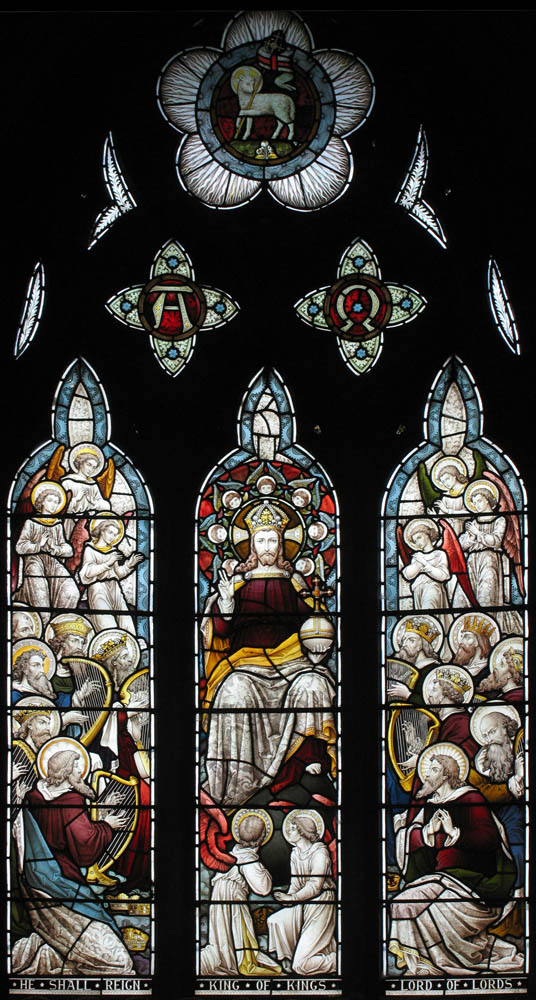
Chancel window

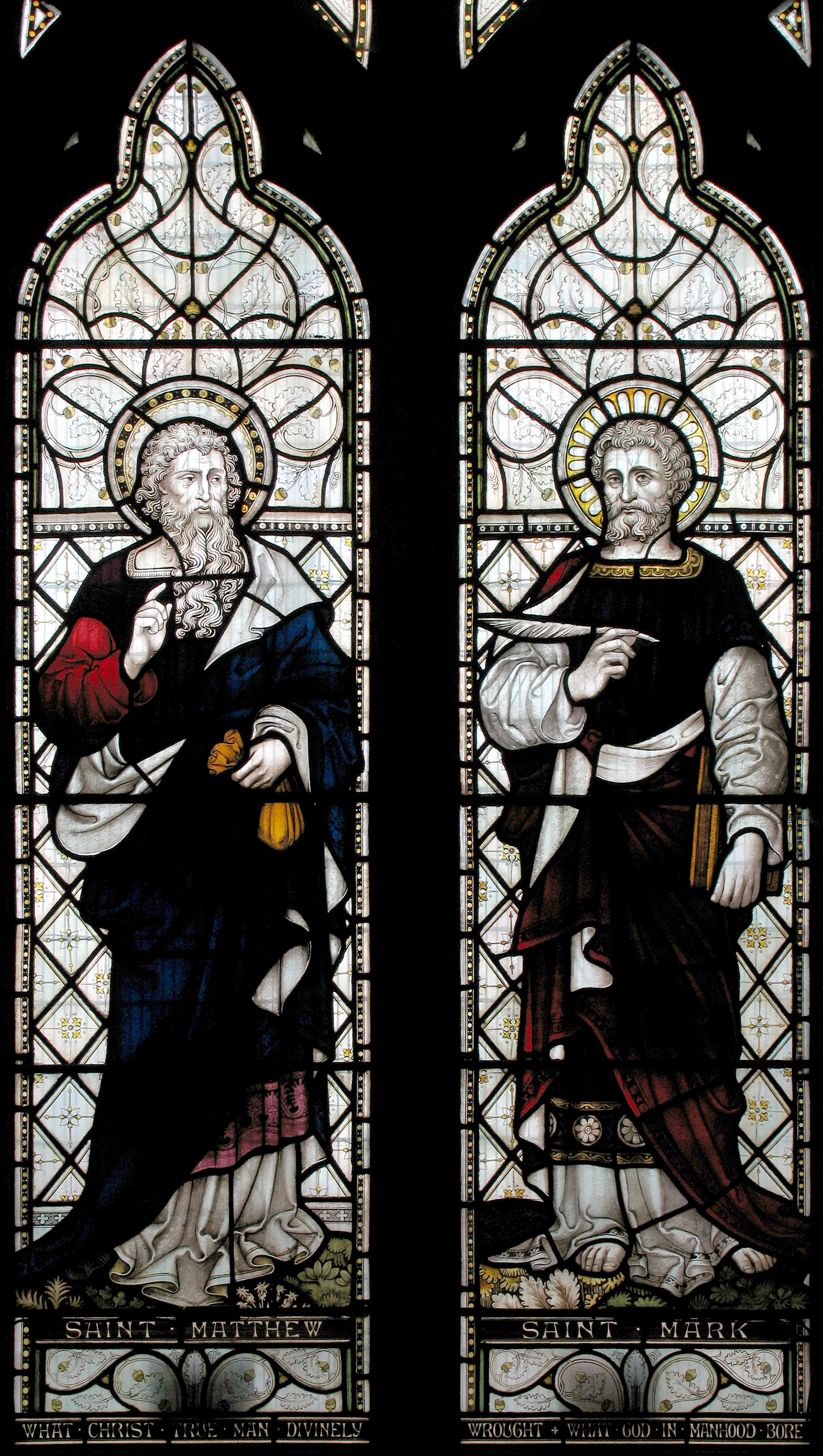

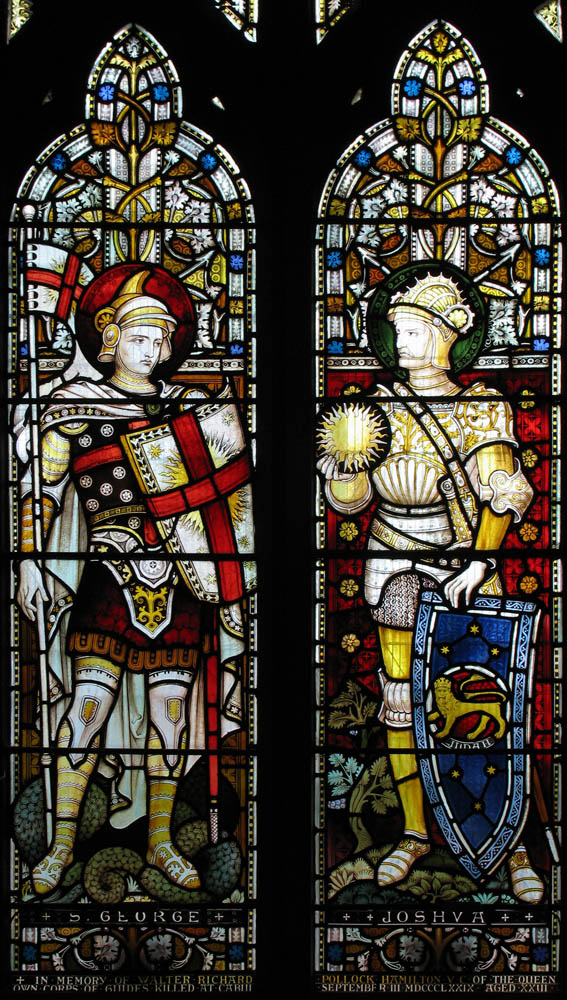

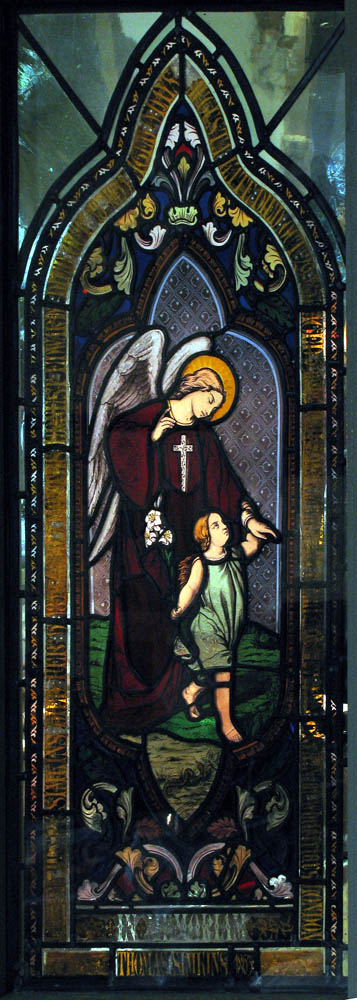

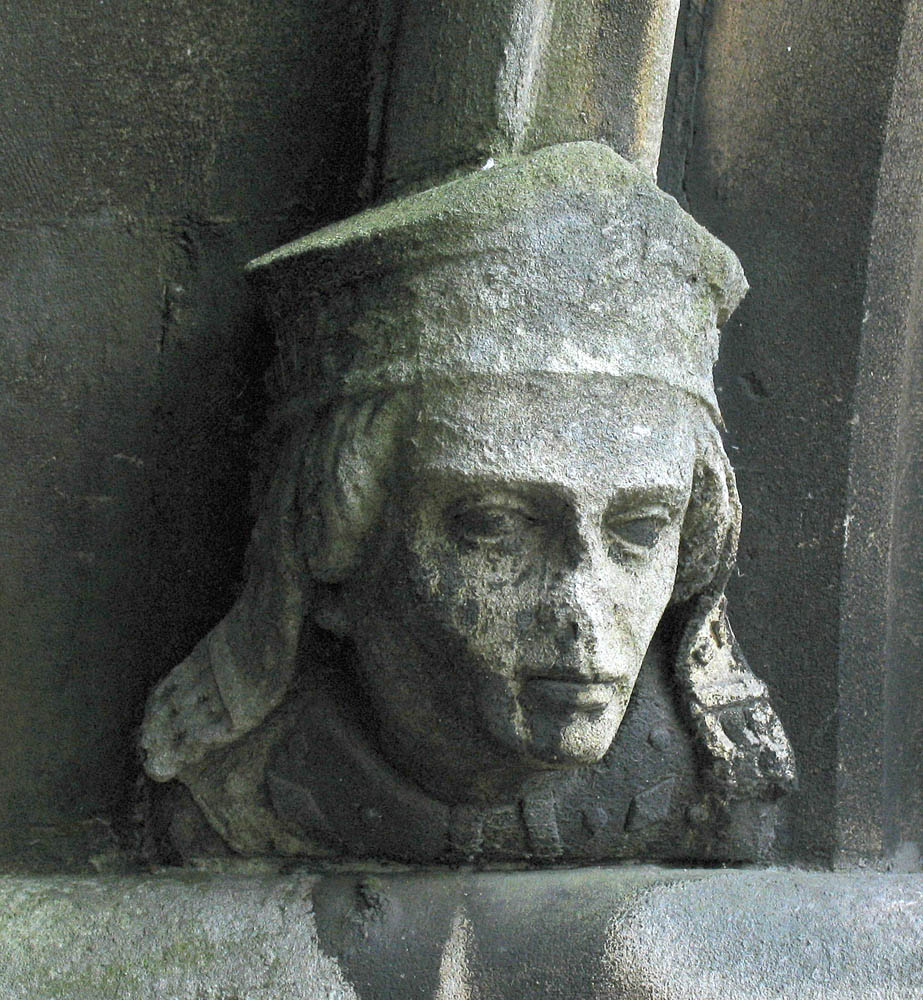

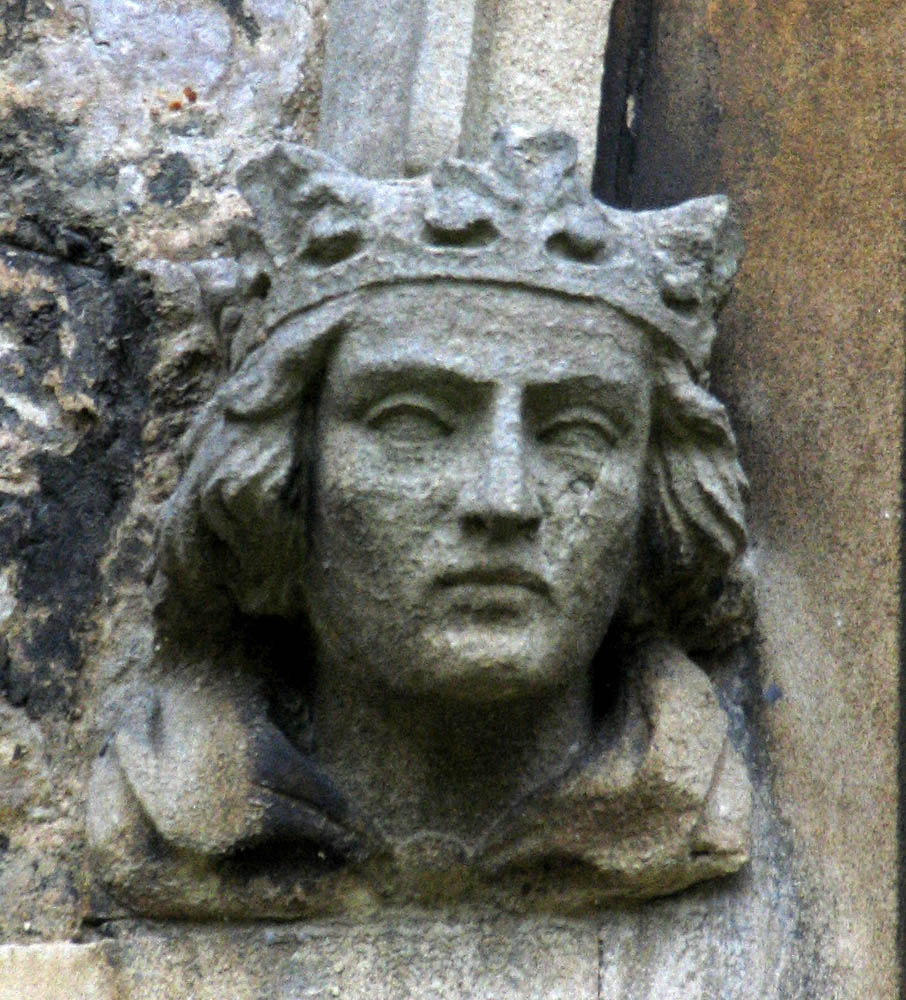

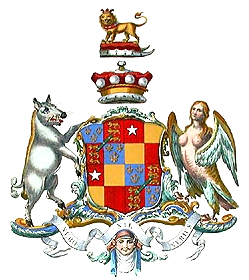
