= Robert Nicoll =

Robert Nicoll (7 January 1814 – 7 December 1837) was a Scottish poet, lyricist and newspaper editor.

== Life ==
Robert was born at the farm of Little Tullybeltane, in the parish of Auchtergaven, Perthshire. When Robert was five years old his father was reduced to poverty, and forced to work as a day labourer. His mother, Grace Fenwick, was able to compensate for his father's inability to give his son more than a slight education by teaching Robert and his siblings to read and write. Robert had eight siblings and he was the second son; however, his older brother died as a child, making him the oldest son. His mother, Grace, recalled that Robert was such a quick child, that he was speaking at nine months in the way of an eighteen-month-old child. At five years old, Robert was reading the New Testament. When the Nicoll family became extremely poor, Robert's mother did not have time to read, which was a great passion of hers. To entertain her while she was working or tending to the household, Robert would read books deemed appropriate for his age group. He studied under several teachers, most notably a Mr. Marshall, who died young. Hearing of his death, Robert wrote to his mother, lamenting, "In fine, he was a young man who has left few equals. I myself owe more to him than years can repay. I could read before I knew him, but he taught me to think." Another instructor, James Anderson of Tullybeltane was a poet himself.

At 16 the boy was apprenticed to a grocer and wine merchant at Perth. Nicoll is quoted in The Life of Robert Nicoll as stating, "to further my progress in life, I bound myself apprentice to Mrs. J. H. Robertson, wine-merchant and grocer in Perth. When I came to Perth, I bought Cobbett's English Grammar, and by constant study soon made myself master of it, and then commenced writing as before; and you know the result." Regardless of the barriers he faced, Robert pursued his academic journey, aware of the value of his intelligence even at the age of 16.

=== Literary career ===
In 1833 he began to contribute to Johnstone's Magazine (later Tait's Magazine), and in the next year, his apprenticeship was cancelled. He visited Edinburgh, and was kindly received there, but obtained no employment. However, in 1835, he published Poems and Lyrics with Edinburgh printer William Tait, which was dedicated to the popular Scottish author "Mrs. Johnstone" (Christian Isobel Johnstone). In critics' opinion, the best of Nicoll's lyrics are those written in the Scottish dialect. Due to this circumstance, and his precocity as a writer of verse and prose, Nicoll was often compared to fellow Scottish poet Robert Burns. One of Nicoll's most famous poems, featured in The Monthly Miscellany of Religion and Letters in 1840 is "God is Everywhere," which begins:

A TRODDEN daisy, from the sward,
With tearful eye I took,
And on its ruined glories I,
With moving heart, did look;
For, crushed and broken though it was,
That little flower was fair;
And oh! I loved the dying bud,
For God was there!

After this publication, Nicolls opened a circulating library at Dundee, and in 1836 became editor of the Leeds Times. Additionally, he was a member of the provisional committee of the Leeds Working Men's Association and of the Leeds Radical Association. While in Dundee, he took on a work partner, a local tradesman who was also in desperate need of money. Robert realized that this partnership was a poor choice since the library business could barely sustain one person, let alone two. In 1836, Robert gave the business over to his partner completely. As he had left the business without gaining anything, his losses concerned his mother, who was in a great measure responsible for his ambitions.

In the midst of a frigid winter and worsening health, on 9 December 1836, Robert Nicoll married Alice Griffiths Suter (or Soutar), the niece of Mr. Peter Brown, editor of the Dundee Advertiser in Dundee. Though the marriage was happy, the couple were under immense financial stress to pay off Nicoll's debts, support themselves, and care for Alice's mother, Mrs. Suter, who came to live with them.

=== Illness and death ===
Espousing pronounced Radical opinions, Nicoll overtaxed his slender physical resources in electioneering work for Sir William Molesworth in the summer of 1837. Due to the stress and pure exhaustion of the election, he was obliged to resign his successful editorship due to his decreasing health. His final letter to his mother dated 13 September 1837 admits the severity of his illness and explains that he did not tell her because he knew it would keep her unsettled. His appetite lessened due to his medications, accelerating the conclusion of his prolonged decline. He died on December 7, 1837, at the house of his friend William Tait, at Trinity, near Edinburgh, after a long battle with an illness caused by stress, exhaustion and lack of proper appetite and rest.

In 1844, the second edition of Poems and Lyrics appeared with an anonymous memoir of the author by Christian Isobel Johnstone. An appreciation of Nicoll's character and his poetry was included in Charles Kingsley's article on Burns and his School in the North British Review for November 1851. In 1884, Peter Robert Drummond wrote a detailed biography entitled, Life of Robert Nicoll, Poet. The poem "We are Lowly" was set to music by Sophia Dobson Colett.

== Works ==
- Poems and Lyrics (1835)
