= Falcondale Lake =

Reservoir in Ceredigion, Wales

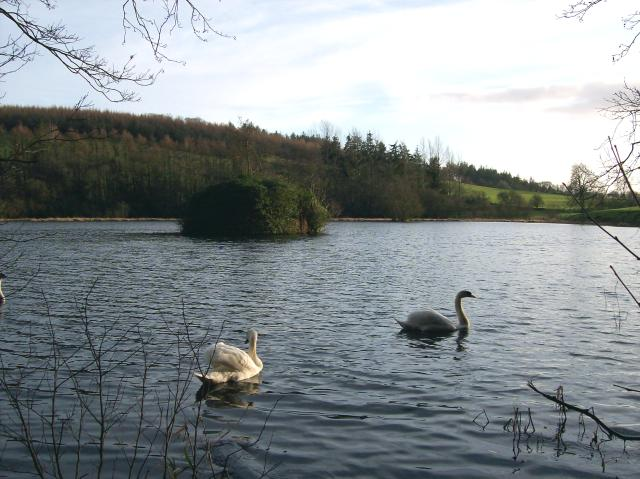
- Falcondale Lake

- Location within Wales
- Location: Ceredigion
- Coordinates: 52.129°N 4.091°W
- Type: reservoir

Falcondale Lake is a man-made lake in the hamlet of Falcondale near Lampeter in Ceredigion It was created as part of the landscaping for Falcondale House. The lake now supports fishing and nature trails. The lake was designated a Site of Special Scientific Interest in 1982 as the only lake in the county supporting reed sweet- grass and blunt-leaved pondweed but its designation was revoked in 2004 when better sites for these species were identified and because the trophic state of the lake had deteriorated from mesotrophic to eutrophic.

== See also ==
- List of Sites of Special Scientific Interest in Ceredigion
