= Falcondale =

Village in Ceredigion, Wales

Coordinates: 52.121323°N 4.098591°W

Falcondale: Welsh: Glyn Hebog
- Location within Ceredigion
- OS grid reference: SN 5642 4908
  - Cardiff: 59.3 mi (95.4 km)
  - London: 174.8 mi (281.3 km)
- Community: Lampeter
- Principal area: Ceredigion
- Country: Wales
- Sovereign state: United Kingdom
- Post town: Lampeter
- Postcode district: SA48
- Dialling code: 01570
- Police: Dyfed-Powys
- Fire: Mid and West Wales
- Ambulance: Welsh
- UK Parliament: Ceredigion Preseli
- Senedd Cymru – Welsh Parliament: Ceredigion

Falcondale (Welsh: Glyn Hebog) is a hamlet in the community of Lampeter, Ceredigion, Wales, and occupies a low bluff overlooking the Nant Creuddyn north-west of Lampeter.

A single track road (the South Drive) can be found on the A475 from Lampeter towards Newcastle Emlyn and Cardigan. The road contains bungalows mostly built in the 1980s. A second single track road (The North Drive) can be found on the A482 from Lampeter to Aberaeron, where workers' cottages are, Home Farm and a coach house dating from 1859. Both drives meet in the centre where the main house is situated, also called Falcondale, which was grade II listed in November 1992.

== History ==
There were three estates in and around Lampeter, Maesyfelin, Peterwell and Falcondale all having substantial houses. Only Falcondale (the youngest of the three) now exists.

Maesyfelin was resided in from the 16th century by the Lloyd family. Sir Lucius Lloyd, High Sheriff of Cardiganshire in 1746, married Anne, daughter of Walter Lloyd of Peterwell. On his death in 1750 his estates were inherited by his widow's family. Only a few garden walls remain of this property, as stones from this house were used to remodel Peterwell House.

Sir Herbert Lloyd, 1st Baronet, had remodelled Peterwell House with a rooftop garden and corner towers after 1755, but before his suicide in 1769. He left many debts and so the house remained empty and became derelict. It was firstly inherited by his nephew John Adams of Whitland Abbey, an MP in Carmarthenshire in 1774–1780, who amassed more debts and eventually sold the estate in 1776 to Albany Wallis the attorney who held the original mortgage. Peterwell Estate was sold to Richard Hart-Davies in 1807, who was a partner of Harford Bank in Bristol. John Scandrett Harford was a partner in the same bank and his son (also called John Scandrett Harford) married Richard Hart-Davies' daughter Louisa. John Scandrett Harford purchased the Peterwell estate from his father-in-law jointly with his younger brother in 1820.

It was John Scandrett Harford's nephew John Battersby Harford who commissioned the architect Thomas Talbot Bury of London to build the Italian style villa that currently stands in Falcondale. Peterwell house became derelict and now only a few stones remain down a lime-lined driveway off the A475, a mile or so west of Lampeter.

== The house ==
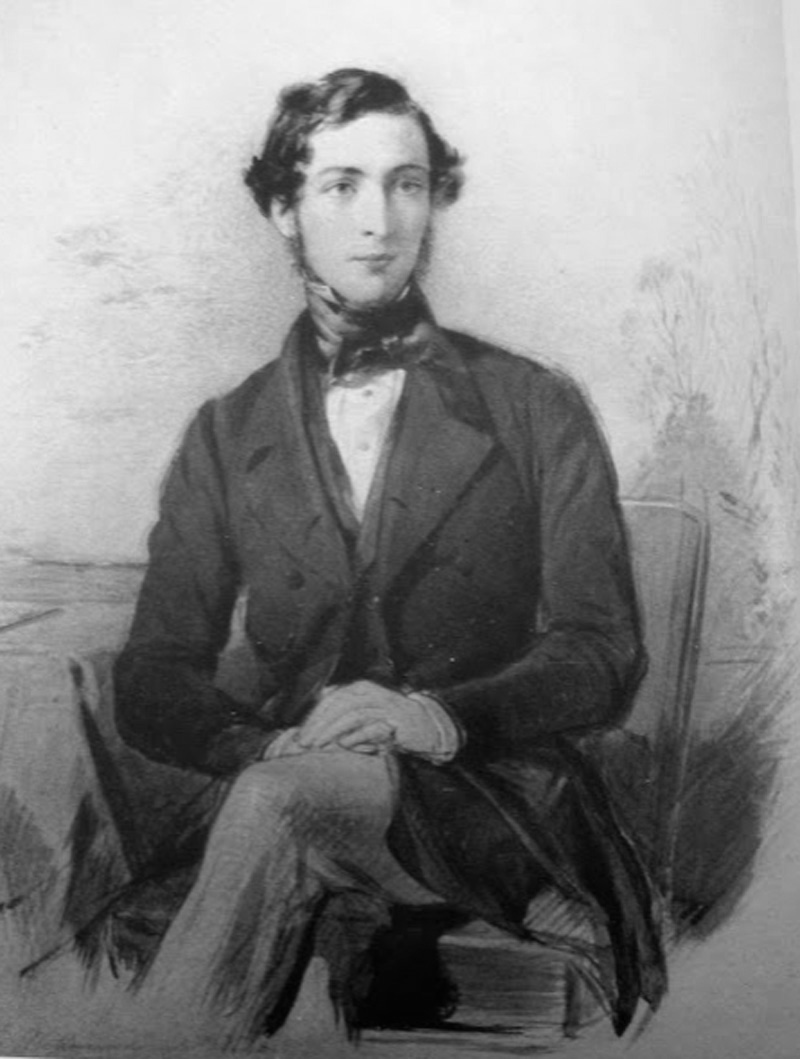
John Battersby Harford, 1846

In 1850 John Battersby-Harford married Mary von Bunsen, daughter of the Prussian ambassador to St. James's. He, and much of his family, spent time in Europe, especially in France and Italy; as testified in Alice Harford's Annals of the Harford Family. This could explain the Italian features seen at Falcondale. Once his training for the bar had ended he decided not to follow his Uncle into Harford bank, but "settle at Falcondale, and gradually to bring order out of the chaos into which the estate had sunk, and to provide decent houses and buildings for tenants". His letters of 1854 to his uncle explains his motivations which contain a hint of the Harford family's Quaker philanthropy.

It is believed that John Battersby Harford built Falcondale on an older farmhouse building dating from 1820. An earlier building shows on the 1845 tithe map with a modest house and a service block near by. The name was changed to Falcondale from the original, Welsh: Pant-y-Curyll loosely translated as "valley of the kestrel".

Keystones above two of the entrances place the newer building at 1859. On being grade II listed in November 1992, it was described as an "Italian villa style on an unusually large scale; stuccoed with painted ashlar dressings and deep-eaved low-pitched hipped roofs. Big panelled stacks with corbelled and sometimes gabled caps".

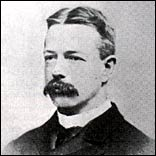
J. C. Harford Esquire

In 1873 it is estimated that the estate had 8,399 acres in Cardiganshire and Carmarthenshire.

The estate passed to his son John Charles Harford in 1875 (pictured), followed by his son John Henry Harford.

The estate was auctioned by Messers Knight, Franks & Rutley (largely to its tenants) in 1951, the main house of Falcondale being bought by the local council and turned into an old people's home. This lasted for 20 years, before the Smith family converted the building into the hotel we see today. Chris and Lisa Hutton (the present owners) bought the property in 2000 and have modernised where required, but the grandeur and architecture of the original building of 1859 mostly remains intact.

== Gardens and lakes ==
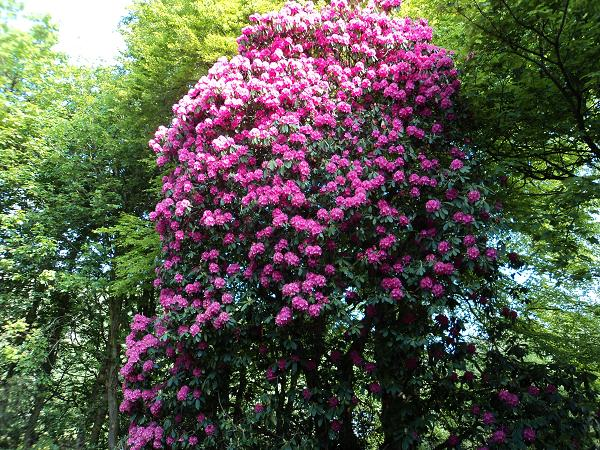
A large rhododendron bush

== See also ==
- Falcondale Lake - a Site of Special Scientific Interest in Ceredigion
- List of localities in Wales by population
