= Joseph Bullock =

Joseph Bullock (1731–1808) was an English country landowner of Caversfield, Bicester and politician who sat in the House of Commons from 1770 to 1775.

== Biography ==
Bullock was the son of Henry Bullock of Stanwell, Middlesex and his wife Mary and was born on 11 December 1731. He was educated at Eton College from 1742 to 1748 and matriculated at Merton College, Oxford in 1749. He married Anne Walter, daughter of Peter Walter, MP of Stalbridge, Dorset. In 1764 Bullock purchased the manor of Caversfield from John Southcote for £3,400 with an annual payment of £40 life annuity to his brother George Southcote alias Parker.

In 1768 Bullock stood on the interest of his friend Lord Verney at Carmarthen, but was defeated and petitioned unsuccessfully. Verney had him returned as Member of Parliament for Wendover at a by-election on 6 September 1770. In the 1774 general election Bullock had to run at his own expense as Verney could not afford to return his friends for nothing. Bullock then vacated his seat in March 1775.

Bullock was High Sheriff of Buckinghamshire in 1781. He died on 13 April 1808 leaving a daughter Amelia Frances Marsham, wife of Canon the Hon. Jacob Marsham who inherited his estate.

Parliament of Great Britain
| Preceded by Sir Robert Darling; Edmund Burke | Member of Parliament for Wendover; 1770–1775; With: Edmund Burke; John Adams; Henry Drummond | Succeeded by Thomas Dummer; Henry Drummond |
