= John Adams (Carmarthen MP) =

British politician (died 1817)

John Adams (c. 1746 – 1817) was a British politician who sat in the House of Commons between 1774 and 1780.

Adams was the son of John Adams of Whitland, Carmarthenshire who was High Sheriff of Pembrokeshire in 1758. His mother was Elizabeth Lloyd, daughter of Walter Lloyd, M.P of Peterwell and sister of Sir Herbert Lloyd, 1st Baronet. He matriculated at Queen's College, Oxford on 23 January 1766, aged 19 and was created MA at Oxford in 1773. It also appears that entered Lincoln's Inn in 1765 and was called to the bar in 1772. In 1769 he inherited the Peterwell and Falcondale estates from his uncle Sir Herbert Lloyd. The estate was therefore already heavily mortgaged, and Adams amassed more debts and attempted to sell the estate. His father died before 1772.

In 1776, a London attorney, who held the original mortgage, bought the Peterwell estate.

Adams was appointed High Sheriff of Carmarthenshire in 1774. In 1774 he was returned as Member of Parliament for both Carmarthen and Wendover and decided to take his seat at Carmarthen. He had gained Carmarthen through the interest of Griffith Philipps but Philipps dropped him as candidate for Carmarthen in 1780. He considered standing at Cardigan, where his remaining estate gave him an interest, but decided not to enter the poll.

Long before his death Lloyd had spent his inheritance. He died on 2 June 1817.

== Sources ==
Parliament of Great Britain
Preceded by Joseph Bullock; Edmund Burke	Member of Parliament for Wendover; 1774– 1774; With: Joseph Bullock	Succeeded by Joseph Bullock; Henry Drummond
Preceded by Griffith Philipps	Member of Parliament for Carmarthen; 1774–1780	Succeeded by George Philipps
