= Aubrey Beauclerk, 5th Duke of St Albans =

British landowner

His Grace The Duke of St Albans
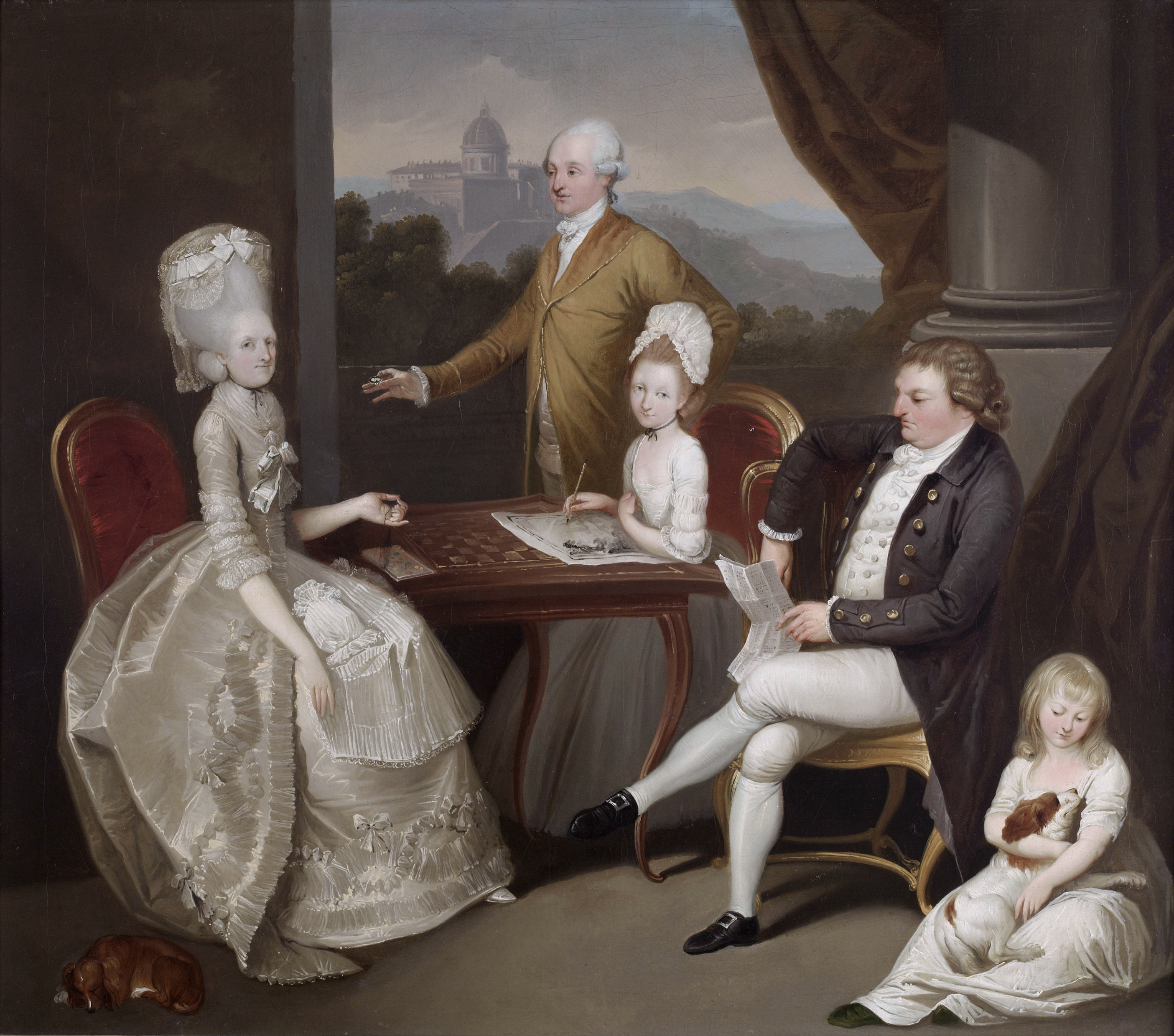
- The Hon. Aubrey Beauclerk (centre) and family (by Franciszek Smuglevicz)

Member of the Great Britain Parliament for Thetford
- In office 1761–1768 Serving with Henry Seymour Conway
- Preceded by: Lord Henry Beauclerk; Herbert Westfaling
- Succeeded by: Henry Seymour Conway; John Drummond

Member of the Great Britain Parliament for Aldborough
- In office 1768–1774 Serving with: Andrew Wilkinson 1768–1772; Earl of Lincoln 1772–1774
- Preceded by: Nathaniel Cholmley; Viscount Villiers
- Succeeded by: Charles Wilkinson; Abel Smith

Personal details
- Born: 3 June 1740
- Died: 9 February 1802 (aged 61)
- Resting place: St George's Church, Hanworth, England
- Spouse: Lady Catherine Ponsonby (m. 1763; died 1789)
- Children: Aubrey Beauclerk, 6th Duke of St Albans; William Beauclerk, 8th Duke of St Albans; Lady Catherine Burgess; Lord Amelius Beauclerk; Lord Frederick Beauclerk; Lady Caroline Dundas; Lady Georgiana Beauclerk
- Parent: Admiral the Lord Vere (father)

Aubrey Beauclerk, 5th Duke of St Albans (3 June 1740 – 9 February 1802), was a British peer and landowner, as well as a collector of antiquities and works of art.

== Early life ==
Born in 1740, the son of Admiral Vere Beauclerk, 1st Baron Vere (third son of Charles Beauclerk, 1st Duke of St Albans), and Mary Chambers (eldest daughter and co-heiress of Thomas Chambers, son of Sir Thomas Chambers of Hanworth Park, Middlesex), he was educated at Westminster School before going up to Queen's College, Oxford.

== Career ==
From 1761 to 1768, the Hon. Aubrey Beauclerk served as Member of Parliament for Thetford and, from 1768 to 1774, as MP for Aldborough.

In 1778, he and his wife embarked on a Grand Tour, following rumours in the press concerning Lady Catherine Beauclerk's relationship with the MP Thomas Brand. Brand accompanied the Beauclerks to Rome, abandoning his own wife and children.

In 1779, Beauclerk financed an excavation with Thomas Jenkins at Centocelle, which discovered several ancient sculptures. To celebrate this successful excavation Beauclerk commissioned Franciszek Smuglewicz to paint a portrait of him and his family at the Roman site (a painting now at Cheltenham Art Gallery). Some sculptures were sold to Giovanni Battista Visconti for the Museo Pio-Clementino in the Vatican and others to the British art collector, Henry Blundell, with many being displayed at Beauclerk's Hanworth House by 1783. While in Italy Beauclerk also bought several paintings.

In 1781 when in Germany, Beauclerk succeeded his father as the 2nd Baron Vere, then in 1787, on the death of his unmarried cousin, as the 5th Duke of St Albans. He inherited Hanworth in 1781 which, five years after inheriting the dukedom, was leased to James Ramsay Cuthbert (who bought the estate after his death).

St Albans, disposing of some antiquities at sales in 1798 and 1801, was a major purchaser at the 1801 sale of his father-in-law's collection.

== Personal life ==
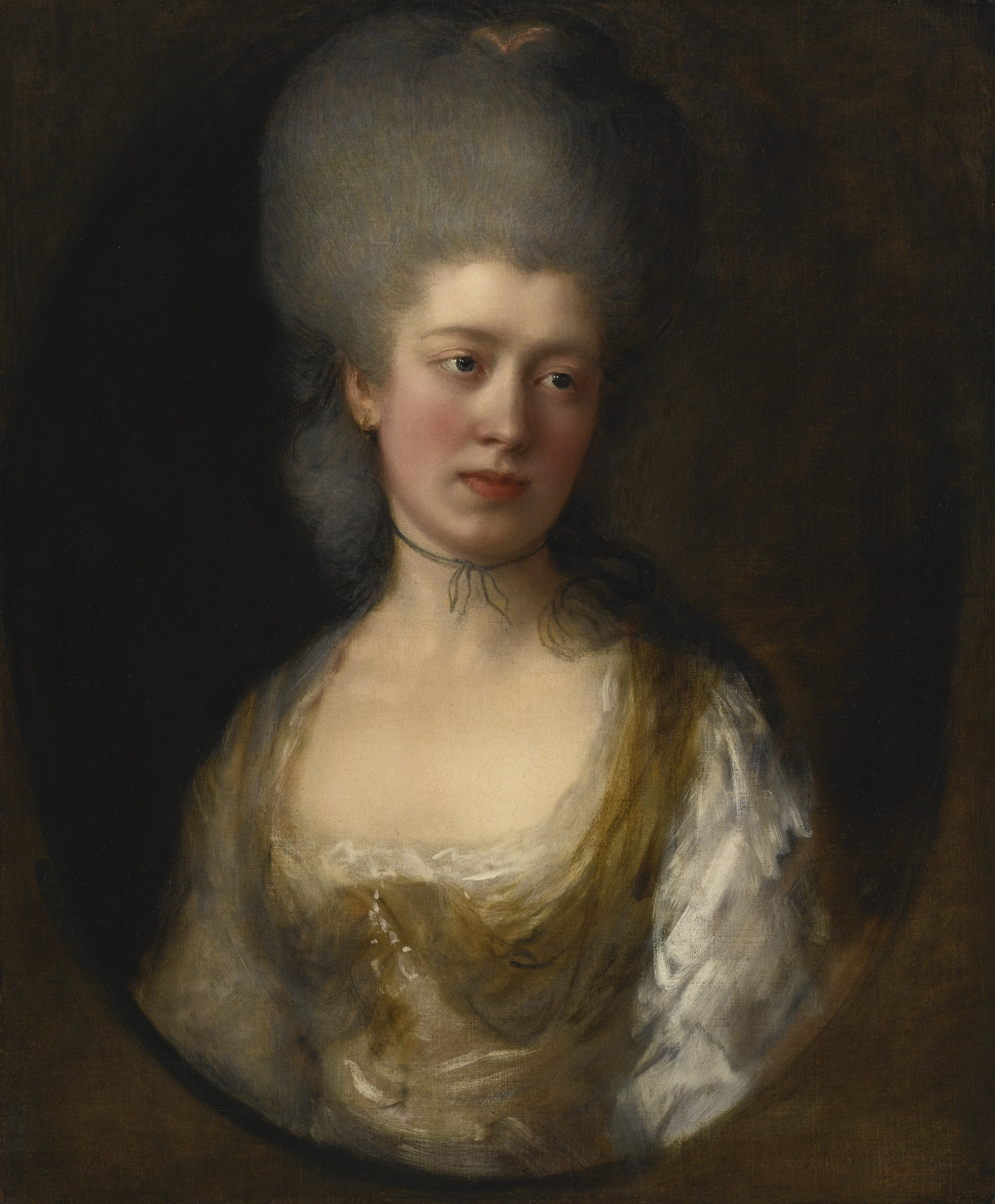
Portrait of Lady Catherine Beauclerk (by Thomas Gainsborough)

On 4 May 1763 the Hon. Aubrey Beauclerk married Lady Catherine Ponsonby (1742–1789), elder daughter of the Anglo-Irish politician William Ponsonby, 2nd Earl of Bessborough, and Lady Caroline Cavendish (eldest daughter of William Cavendish, 3rd Duke of Devonshire). Together, the Hon. Aubrey and Lady Catherine Beauclerk were parents of seven children:

- Aubrey Beauclerk, 6th Duke of St Albans (1765–1815)
- William Beauclerk, 8th Duke of St Albans (1766–1825)
- Lady Catherine Elizabeth Beauclerk (c. 1768–1803), who married the Revd James Burgess, Vicar of Hanworth, on 1 September 1802.
- Admiral Lord Amelius Beauclerk (1771–1846), who died unmarried.
- The Revd Lord Frederick Beauclerk (1773–1850), who married the Hon. Charlotte Dillon (younger daughter of Charles Dillon, 12th Viscount Dillon).
- Lady Caroline Beauclerk (c. 1775–1838), who married the Hon. Charles Dundas (son of Thomas Dundas, 1st Baron Dundas).
- Lady Georgiana Beauclerk (1776–1791), who died unmarried aged 15.

The 5th Duke of St Albans died in 1802, and is buried at St George's Church, Hanworth.

== See also ==
- Baron Vere of Hanworth

Parliament of Great Britain
Preceded by Lord Henry Beauclerk; Herbert Westfaling	Member of Parliament for Thetford; 1761–1768; With: Henry Seymour Conway	Succeeded by Henry Seymour Conway; John Drummond
Preceded by Nathaniel Cholmley; Viscount Villiers	Member of Parliament for Aldborough; 1768–1774; With: Andrew Wilkinson 1768–1772; Earl of Lincoln 1772–1774	Succeeded by Charles Wilkinson; Abel Smith
Peerage of England
Preceded by George Beauclerk	Duke of St Albans; 1787–1802	Succeeded by Aubrey Beauclerk
Peerage of Great Britain
Preceded by Vere Beauclerk	Baron Vere; 1781–1802	Succeeded by Aubrey Beauclerk
