= Charles Wilkinson (MP) =

British politician

Charles Wilkinson (1725-1782), was a British politician who sat in the House of Commons between 1774 and 1777, during which time he was judged insane.

Wilkinson was the son of Andrew Wilkinson, MP for Aldborough and his wife Barbara Jessop. He was admitted at Pembroke College, Cambridge on 2 July 1742, and entered Middle Temple on 23 July 1742. He was called to the bar in 1749.

Wilkinson's father was estate agent to the Duke of Newcastle and Charles helped his father in managing the Duke's pocket boroughs of Aldborough and Boroughbridge. In 1774 he was returned as Member of Parliament for Aldborough.

By May 1775 Wilkinson had suffered a mental breakdown. and on 8 September was confined under the care of Dr. Willis. The Duke was at pains to get him to resign his seat, and the question was whether he was actually sane enough to resign from Parliament. In 1776 when he was asked, he could not be prevailed upon to give any direct answer. Instead he made confused remarks that “his consent signified nothing about his seat in Parliament, but that he would never go again either into the House of Commons or to London - all he wished for was a safe retirement”. With the consent of Charles's friends, it was concluded that the Duke was at full liberty to proceed as he intended and the seat was vacated in 1777.

Wilkinson died in March 1782.

Parliament of Great Britain
Preceded by Hon. Aubrey Beauclerk; Earl of Lincoln	Member of Parliament for Aldborough; 1774–1777; With: Abel Smith	Succeeded by William Baker; Abel Smith
