= George Drummond (politician) =

Scottish politician and accountant

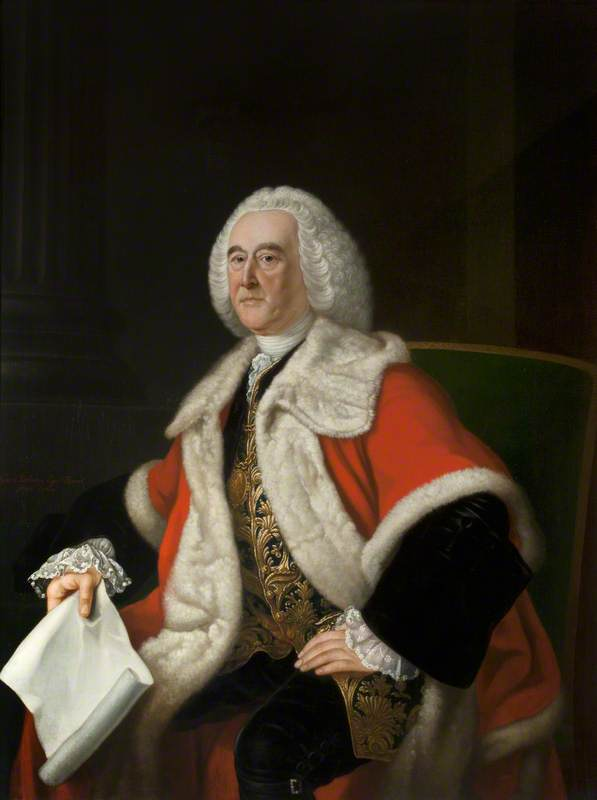
Lord Provost George Drummond

George Drummond (1688–1766) was a Scottish politician and accountant who served as the Lord Provost of Edinburgh multiple times between 1725 and 1764.

== Life ==
Drummond was not, as often claimed, the grandson or great grandson of his namesake Sir George Drummond who had been Provost of Edinburgh 1683 to 1685 and who had resided on Anchor Close on the Royal Mile in Edinburgh. Sir George Drummond, 8th of Milnab, Lord Provost in 1683, was from a completely different branch of the Drummond family.

Drummond was born at Newton Castle near Blairgowrie, Perthshire. He was educated at the High School in Edinburgh and began his career as an accountant, working on the financial details of the 1707 Act of Union at 18. In 1707 he was appointed Accountant General, at age 20, of the Board of Customs, being promoted to Commissioner in 1717.

By the 1720s, the English were attempting to reform the Scottish taxation system, which resulted in public demonstrations during June 1725 against the enactment of the English malt tax in Scotland. During the malt tax riots in Glasgow, an apprentice named Andrew Millar directly challenged Drummond's authority by printing opposition material in Leith, outside the council of Edinburgh's jurisdiction.

Drummond was a strong opponent of Jacobitism, and fought against a Jacobite force commanded by John Erskine, Earl of Mar at the Battle of Sheriffmuir in 1715. He also raised a company of volunteers to try to defend the city of Edinburgh against a Jacobite army commanded by Charles Edward Stuart during the Jacobite rising of 1745.

Drummond first joined the Edinburgh Town Council in 1716. He raised funds to build the Royal Infirmary, designed by William Adam in 1738, which quickly became one of the world's foremost teaching hospitals. In 1760 he was responsible for commissioning the Royal Exchange, which later became the Edinburgh City Chambers. He was also a great promoter of the University of Edinburgh, encouraging its enlargement and establishing five professorships of medicine.

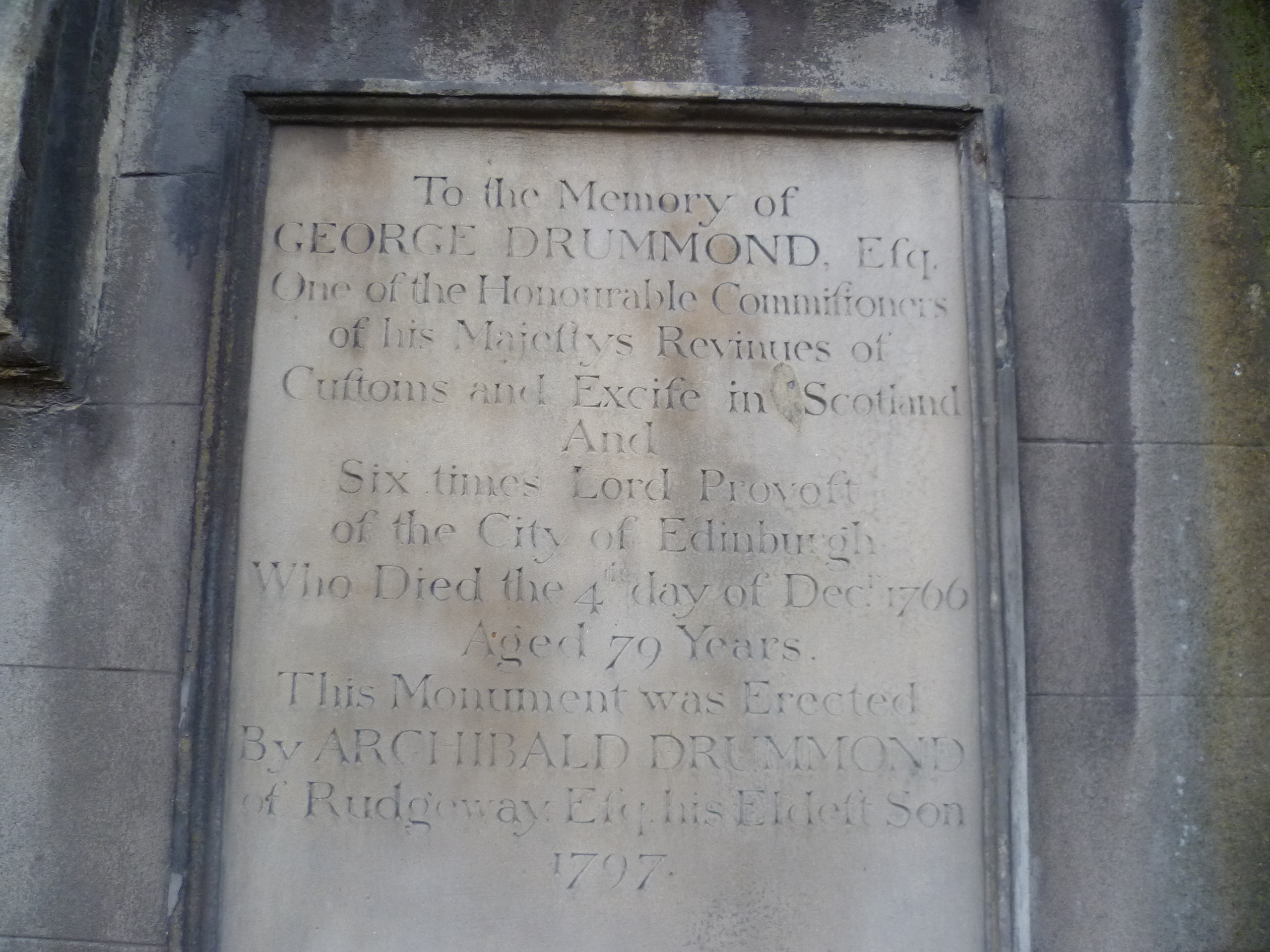
Memorial tablet over Drummond's grave.

Drummond is known best as the main promoter of the building of Edinburgh's 'New Town'. His intent was to alleviate the unhealthy and overcrowded conditions of the Old Town. In 1766 he persuaded the Town Council to fund an ambitious plan for a grand extension to the city on its north side and to hold a competition for the design. The competition was won by the young architect James Craig who was then only age 21. In 1759, Drummond also began the decades-long draining of the insanitary Nor' Loch and identified the need for the North Bridge as the gateway of the New Town, laying its foundation stone in 1763.

Drummond was also a Freemason. He was initiated into Freemasonry in The Lodge of Edinburgh (Mary's Chapel) No.1, in 1721 and in 1739 became the Founder Master of Lodge Drummond Kilwinning from Greenock (now dormant). He served as Grand Master Mason of the Grand Lodge of Scotland from November 1752 to November 1753. In this capacity he laid the foundation stone of the new Royal Exchange on the Royal Mile on 13 September 1753, the building being used later as the City Chambers.

In 1722 Drummond was Initiated as a Free Gardener in the Free Gardener's Lodge at Dunfermline.

Drummond's house was north of the city. It was bought by General John Scott after Drummond's death and redeveloped as a substantial villa known as Bellevue House or Lodge. It was purchased later as the Excise Office for Edinburgh. It stood in the centre of what is now Drummond Place which is named in honour of George Drummond.

He died in Edinburgh on 4 December 1766.

Drummond is buried in the Canongate Churchyard, the burial ground of the Canongate Kirk. His name is remembered locally by Drummond Place, the street in the New Town which was developed in the location where he had owned a country house in what is now Drummond Place Gardens and Drummond Street, next to the site occupied previously by the Royal Infirmary.

== Family ==
His sister May Drummond became a Quaker minister and published a book of letters.

His daughter Jean Drummond (died 1766) married Reverend John Jardine in 1744, Jardine being "second charge" minister of Tron Kirk on the Royal Mile and Dean of the Chapel Royal.

Masonic offices
Preceded by The Earl of Erroll	Grand Master of the Grand Lodge of Scotland; 1752–1753	Succeeded by Charles Hamilton Gordon
