= Leeds Times =

- Editor: Robert Nicoll, Samuel Smiles
- Founded: 7 March 1833
- Ceased publication: 30 March 1901

The Leeds Times was a weekly newspaper established in 1833, and published at the office in Briggate, Leeds, West Yorkshire, England. It ceased publication on 30 March 1901, with Robert Nicoll as one of its first editors, and Samuel Smiles as its editor from 1839 to 1848.

== History ==
The first issue of Leeds Times was on Thursday 7 March 1833, the last issue was 30 March 1901.
