= James Drummond =

James Drummond may refer to:

== Noblemen ==
- James Drummond, 1st Earl of Perth (died 1611), Earl of Perth
- James Drummond, 3rd Earl of Perth (c. 1615–1675), Earl of Perth
- James Drummond, 4th Earl of Perth (1648–1716), Scottish statesman, and Jacobite
- James Drummond, 2nd Duke of Perth (c. 1674–1720), de jure 5th Earl of Perth
- James Drummond, 3rd Duke of Perth (1713–1746), de jure 6th Earl of Perth
- James Drummond, 3rd Duke of Melfort (1708–1766) de jure 11th Earl of Perth
- James Louis Drummond, 4th Duke of Melfort (1750–1800) de jure 12th Earl of Perth
- James Eric Drummond, 16th Earl of Perth (1876–1951), British diplomat, first secretary-general of the League of Nations
- James Drummond, Viscount Strathallan (born 1965), heir apparent, see Earl of Perth
- James Drummond, 1st Baron Perth (1744–1800), Scottish landowner and peer
- James Drummond, 5th Viscount Strathallan, de jure Viscount Strathallan (1722–1765)
- James Drummond, 6th Viscount Strathallan, de jure Viscount Strathallan (c. 1752–1775)
- James Drummond, 8th Viscount Strathallan (1767–1851), Viscount Strathallan
- James Drummond, 10th Viscount Strathallan (1839–1893), Viscount Strathallan
- James Drummond, 1st Lord Maderty (1540?–1623), Scottish peer

== Others ==
- James Drummond (artist) (1816–1877), Scottish artist
- James Drummond (Australian politician) (1814–1873), Member of the Western Australian Legislative Council, 1870–1873
- James Drummond (bishop) (1629–1695), Bishop of Brechin
- James Drummond (botanist) (1786/7–1863), Scottish-born botanist and naturalist, early settler in Western Australia
- James Montagu Frank Drummond (1881–1965), Scottish botanist
- James Drummond (chaplain) (died 1699), Scottish chaplain
- James Lawson Drummond (1783–1853), Irish physician, naturalist and botanist
- James Mackay Drummond (1869–1940), New Zealand journalist, naturalist and writer
- James Ramsay Drummond (1851–1921), civil servant in India, and amateur botanist
- James Robert Drummond (1812–1895), British naval officer, captain of part of the Mediterranean Fleet during the Crimean War
- James S. Drummond (died 1881), mayor of Victoria, British Columbia

== See also ==
- Jim Drummond (1918–1950), Canadian ice hockey defenceman
- Jimmy Drummond (1881–?), Scottish footballer
- Roscoe Drummond (1902–1983), born James Roscoe Drummond, American journalist
