= May Drummond =

May Drummond (1696/7 - 1777) was a Scottish Quaker minister. Eighteenth-century literary figures Alexander Pope and Samuel Johnson each used Drummond as a character in their writings.

== Biography ==
May Drummond was born c1696/7. She was a member of the Scottish gentry and the sister of George Drummond, the long-time Lord Provost of Edinburgh. She converted from the Church of Scotland to Quakerism in 1731, after attending the Edinburgh Yearly Meeting and hearing an address given by Thomas Story. Drummond was called to the Quaker ministry three years later, and she held public meetings throughout west and south England in 1735 and 1736. In 1735 she was received by Caroline of Ansbach. In magazines and pamphlets of this time, Drummond was both celebrated and criticized for her work as a woman preacher.

Drummond adapted Ibn Tufail's Ḥayy ibn Yaqẓān as a way to criticize "priestly hierarchies and manmade artifice" and drew the attention of Alexander Pope, who praised her as "an embodiment of virtue," and Samuel Johnson, who thought she exemplified "Quaker subversions." Seen as a threat to the centralized power of the male Quaker elite, she was expelled from the Society of Friends in 1766.
