= William Drummond =

William Drummond or Bill Drummond is the name of:

- William Drummond of Hawthornden (1585–1649), Scottish poet, influenced by Spenser; best known for illustrated essay, Cypresse Grove
- William Drummond (colonial governor) (c. 1617–1677), Scottish administrator in the Province of Carolina; participant in Bacon's Rebellion
- William Drummond, 1st Viscount Strathallan (1617–1688), Scottish soldier and politician
- William Drummond, 2nd Viscount Strathallan (1670–1702)
- William Drummond, 3rd Viscount Strathallan (1694–1711)
- William Drummond, 4th Viscount Strathallan (1690–1746), Scottish-English supporter of the Jacobite cause; died in the Battle of Culloden
- William Abernethy Drummond (c. 1719–1809), Bishop of Edinburgh
- William Drummond of Logiealmond (c. 1770–1828), Scottish classical scholar, philosopher, diplomat, and MP in Scotland and England
- William Hamilton Drummond (1778–1865), poet
- William Drummond, 7th Viscount Strathallan (1810–1886), Scottish Conservative politician
- William Henry Drummond (1854–1907), Canadian poet, born in Ireland, elected a fellow of the Royal Society of Literature in 1898
- William Drummond, 15th Earl of Perth (1871–1937), succeeded as 15th Earl of Perth in 1902
- William Eugene Drummond (1876–1946), American architect
- William Drummond (footballer) (1890–1966), Australian rules footballer
- William Drummond, a pseudonym for Arthur Calder-Marshall (1908–1992), British novelist
- William J. Drummond (born 1944), American journalism professor at the University of California (Berkeley)
- Bill Drummond (born 1953), Scottish musician, author, conceptual artist, music-industry entrepreneur and co-founder of The KLF
- Billy Drummond (born 1959), American jazz drummer
