= Juan Bennett Drummond =

African-American physician

Juan F. Bennett Drummond
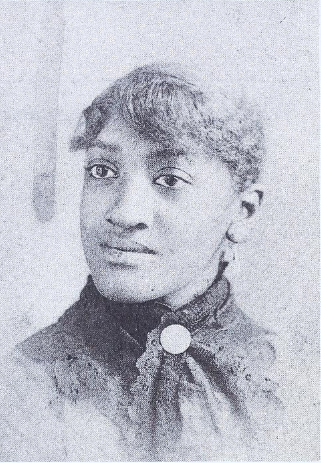
- Born: June 7, 1864; New Bedford, Massachusetts
- Died: November 4, 1926 (aged 62); New Bedford, Massachusetts
- Education: Woman's Medical College of Pennsylvania
- Known for: First African American woman to hold a medical license in Massachusetts

Juan F. Bennett Drummond (June 7, 1864 - November 4, 1926) was an American physician. In 1888, she became the first African American woman to become a licensed doctor in the U.S. state of Massachusetts.

== Biography ==
Drummond was born on June 7, 1864, in New Bedford, Massachusetts. She was a descendant of Paul Cuffe. She graduated from New Bedford High School in 1883, and from the Women's Medical College of Pennsylvania in 1888.

Drummond ran a private medical practice for 34 years, first working from her home, and later from an office above the State Theater in New Bedford. She was the first African American woman to work as a licensed physician in Massachusetts. She was also involved with improving her community and was one of the founders of the New Bedford Home for the Aged.

Drummond died at her home on November 4, 1926.
