= José Aurélio Drummond Jr. =

Brazilian businessman

- Born: 1963 or 1964 (age 61–62)
- Education: Centro Universitário da FEI
- Occupation: Businessman
- Known for: Global CEO of BRF S.A.
- Title: CEO, BRF S.A.

José Aurélio Drummond Jr. (born c. 1964) is a Brazilian businessman. He is the global chief executive officer (CEO) of BRF S.A.

== Early life ==
Drummond was born circa 1964. He graduated from the Centro Universitário da FEI, and attended the executive development program at the Wharton School of the University of Pennsylvania.

== Career ==
Drummond worked at Eneva, Alcoa and Whirlpool. On November 22, 2017, he succeeded Pedro de Andrade Faria as the global CEO of BRF S.A.
