= Michael Frank Drummond =

British health economist (born 1948)

- Born: April 30, 1948 (age 78)
- Citizenship: British

Academic background
- Education: University of Birmingham; University of York

Academic work
- Discipline: Health economics
- Institutions: Aston University; University of Birmingham; University of York

Michael Frank Drummond (born 30 April 1948) is a British health economist known for his contributions to the economic evaluation of health care interventions, health technology assessment, and applied health economics. He has held senior academic posts in the United Kingdom, Canada, and Italy, and has served as president of both the International Society of Technology Assessment in Health Care (ISTAHC) and the International Society for Pharmacoeconomics and Outcomes Research (ISPOR).

== Early life and education ==
Drummond was born on 30 April 1948 and is a British citizen.

Drummond received a B.Sc. (Honours, Class I) in Industrial Metallurgy from the University of Birmingham in 1970, followed by an M.Com. in Business Administration from the same institution in 1972. He completed a D.Phil. in Economics at the University of York in 1983.

== Academic career ==
Drummond began his academic career in 1972 as a Lecturer in Public Sector Management at the University of Aston in Birmingham. From 1975 to 1978 he was Research Fellow in Health Economics at the University of York.

Between 1978 and 1986 he held several academic and leadership roles at the Health Services Management Centre (HSMC), University of Birmingham, serving as Senior Lecturer, Assistant Director (1984), and Acting Director (1985–1986).

In 1983–1984 he was Visiting Associate Professor in the Department of Clinical Epidemiology and Biostatistics at McMaster University in Canada.

Drummond joined the University of York in 1990 as Professor of Health Economics at the Centre for Health Economics (CHE). He served as a board member of CHE from 1995 to 2005, continued as Professor of Health Economics until 2022 and was appointed Professor Emeritus the same year.

Drummond has also held part-time and visiting positions at the London School of Economics and Political Science, and served as Visiting Professor at LSE Health from 2007 to 2014. Since 2008 he has been an Honorary Fellow at the Centre for Research on Health and Social Care Management (CERGAS), Bocconi University, Milan.

== Other roles ==
Drummond worked as an engineering trainee at Imperial Metal Industries Ltd between 1966 and 1971. From 1998 to 2006 he served as Vice-President (European Operations) of Innovus Research Inc. He was Director of OHE Consulting Limited and the Office of Health Economics (OHE) from January 2016 to January 2022.

Drummond has consulted for the World Health Organization and was Project Leader for a European Union initiative on economic appraisal methodology. Since 2024, he has been affiliated with Quadrant Health Economics Inc.

== Professional appointments ==
Drummond was a member of the Medicines Commission in the United Kingdom from 1988 to 1991. He has served on the editorial boards of several journals, including Health Economics, PharmacoEconomics, the British Journal of Medical Economics, Health Policy, the Journal of Evaluation in Clinical Practice, the International Journal of Technology Assessment in Health Care and The European Journal of Health Economics. He also served as Associate Editor of the Journal of Mental Health Policy and Economics from 1996 onwards.

Drummond was President of the International Society of Technology Assessment in Health Care (ISTAHC) from 1997 to 1999, and Past-President from 1999 to 2001; and later served as President (2006–2007) and Past-President (2007–2008) of the International Society for Pharmacoeconomics and Outcomes Research (ISPOR).

Drummond was a member of the National Institute for Clinical Excellence (NICE) Guidelines Advisory Committee from 2000 to 2003, and chaired the NICE Guidelines Review Panel between 2003 and 2012. He also served on the Steering Group for the NICE Methods Review (2020–2022).

Drummond served as Co-Editor-in-Chief of Value in Health from 2010 to April 2024, and has since served as Editor Emeritus. Drummond was elected a member of the Institute of Medicine (now the National Academy of Medicine) of the United States in 2015.

== Research ==
Drummond's research focuses on the economics of health and health services, with particular emphasis on the economic evaluation of health care interventions and technologies. His work has addressed cost–effectiveness analysis across diverse clinical areas, including neonatal intensive care, cancer diagnostics, digital imaging, pharmaceutical therapy, and eye health care.

His research also includes analyses of the costs and resource use of university teaching hospitals, and the development of strategies to improve cost–effectiveness in health care, such as clinical guidelines, technology assessment methods and quality assurance mechanisms.

A further strand of Drummond's work examines how economic analysis can support policy making and management at different levels of the health care system. Drummond is also known for his contributions to teaching and knowledge translation, particularly in communicating health economics principles to clinicians and other non-economists working in the health sector. He has served as consultant on economic evaluation projects for governments and international organisations, including the World Health Organization.

Drummond co-authored Methods for the Economic Evaluation of Health Care Programmes, first published in 1987 and subsequently revised through multiple editions, including a fourth edition published in 2015. The book provides a structured framework for conducting and appraising economic evaluations of health care interventions and has been widely used in postgraduate teaching and professional training in health economics and health technology assessment.

== Honours and distinctions ==
Drummond has received several major international awards in recognition of his contributions to health economics and the methodology of economic evaluation. He received the Avedis Donabedian Outcomes Research Lifetime Achievement Award from the International Society for Pharmacoeconomics and Outcomes Research (ISPOR) in 2004.

Drummond was awarded a Doctor of Science (honoris causa) by City University London in 2008, followed by a Doctorate Honoris Causa from Erasmus University Rotterdam in 2012. In 2012, Drummond also received the John M. Eisenberg Award from the Society for Medical Decision Making for the practical application of medical decision-making research.

In 2014, Drummond was recognised by the Center for the Evaluation of Value and Risk in Health (CEVR) at Tufts University during the 15th anniversary of the Cost-Effectiveness Analysis Registry, in acknowledgement of his contributions to cost-effectiveness analysis. He received a Doctor Honoris Causa from the University of Lisbon in 2015.

== Selected publications ==
Drummond has authored or co-authored over 600 publications across health economics, health technology assessment, and applied decision sciences. The following is a selection of recent peer-reviewed works:

- Drummond, Michael F. (1997). "Users' Guides to the Medical Literature: XIII. How to Use an Article on Economic Analysis of Clinical Practice A. Are the Results of the Study Valid?". JAMA. 277 (19): 1552–1557. doi:10.1001/jama.1997.03540430064035. ISSN 0098-7484.
- O'Brien, Bernie J. (1997). "Users' Guides to the Medical Literature: XIII. How to Use an Article on Economic Analysis of Clinical Practice B. What Are the Results and Will They Help Me in Caring for My Patients?". JAMA. 277 (22): 1802–1806. doi:10.1001/jama.1997.03540460066034. ISSN 0098-7484.
- Drummond, Michael F.; Wilson, David A.; Kanavos, Panos; Ubel, Peter; Rovira, Joan (2007). "Assessing the economic challenges posed by orphan drugs". International Journal of Technology Assessment in Health Care. 23 (1): 36–42. doi:10.1017/S0266462307051550. ISSN 0266-4623.
- Drummond, Michael F.; Sculpher, Mark J.; Claxton, Karl; Stoddart, Greg L.; Torrance, George W. (2015). Methods for the Economic Evaluation of Health Care Programmes. Oxford University Press. ISBN 978-0-19-164358-3.
- Husereau, Don; Drummond, Michael; Augustovski, Federico; de Bekker-Grob, Esther; Briggs, Andrew H; Carswell, Chris; Caulley, Lisa; Chaiyakunapruk, Nathorn; Greenberg, Dan; Loder, Elizabeth; Mauskopf, Josephine; Mullins, C Daniel; Petrou, Stavros; Pwu, Raoh-Fang; Staniszewska, Sophie (2022). "Consolidated Health Economic Evaluation Reporting Standards 2022 (CHEERS 2022) statement: updated reporting guidance for health economic evaluations". MDM Policy & Practice. 7 (1). doi:10.1177/23814683211061097. ISSN 2381-4683. PMC 8755935. PMID 35036563.
- Corbacho, B.; Drummond, M. F.; Santos, R.; Jones, E.; Borras, J. M.; Mestre-Ferrandiz, J.; Espin, J.; Henry, N.; Prat, A. (2020). "Does the use of health technology assessment have an impact on the utilisation of health care resources? Evidence from two European countries". European Journal of Health Economics. doi:10.1007/s10198-020-01160-5.
- Drummond, M. F.; Neumann, P.; Sullivan, S.; Fricke, F. U.; Tunis, S.; Dabbous, O.; Toumi, M. (2019). "Analytic considerations in applying a general economic evaluation reference case to gene therapy". Value in Health. 22 (6): 661–668. doi:10.1016/j.jval.2019.03.012.
- Drummond, M. F.; Federici, C.; Reckers-Droog, V.; Torbica, A.; Blankart, C. R.; Ciani, O.; Kaló, Z.; Kovács, S.; Brouwer, W. (2022). "Coverage with evidence development for medical devices in Europe: can practice meet theory?". Health Economics. doi:10.1002/hec.4478.
- Tarricone, R.; Banks, H.; Ciani, O.; Drummond, M. F. (2023). "An accelerated access pathway for innovative high-risk medical devices under the new European Union Medical Devices and Health Technology Assessment Regulations? Analysis and recommendations". Expert Review of Medical Devices. doi:10.1080/17434440.2023.2192868.
- Robertson, D.; Rex, D. K.; Ciani, O.; Drummond, M. F. (2024). "Colonoscopy vs. the fecal immunochemical test: which is best?". Gastroenterology. 166 (5): 758–771. doi:10.1053/j.gastro.2023.12.027.
- Ardito, V.; Ciani, O.; Drummond, M. F. (2024). "Design and features of pricing and payment schemes for health technologies: a scoping review and a proposal for a flexible need-driven classification". Pharmacoeconomics. doi:10.1007/s40273-024-01435-2.
