= Thomas Drummond (disambiguation) =

Thomas Drummond (1797–1840) was a Scottish civil engineer.

Thomas Drummond may also refer to:

- Thomas Drummond (botanist) (1793–1835), Scottish botanical collector
- Thomas Drummond (judge) (1809–1890), American judge
- Thomas Drummond (politician) (1833–1865), American politician and Civil War soldier from Iowa
- Thomas Drummond, Lord Drummond (1742–1780), Scottish landowner and diplomat
- Tom Drummond (footballer) (1897–1970), Australian rules footballer
- Tom Drummond (musician) (born 1969), American musician, bassist for Better Than Ezra
