= Henry Drummond (1762–1794) =

English banker and politician

Henry Drummond (13 January 1762 – 4 July 1794), of The Grange, near Alresford, Hampshire, was an English banker and politician who sat in the House of Commons from 1790 to 1794.

Drummond was the son of Hon. Henry Drummond, banker of Charing Cross, Westminster and The Grange and his wife Elizabeth Compton, daughter of Hon. Charles Compton (son of the 4th Earl of Northampton). He was educated at Harrow School from 1774 to 1779. He married Anne Dundas, daughter of Henry Dundas on 13 February 1786.

Drummond was made a partner in the family bank in 1787. In the 1790 general election he was returned without opposition as Member (MP) of the Parliament of Great Britain for Castle Rising. He suffered from an unexplained disease and died in 1794 after a "gradual decline". His son Henry was also a banker and MP.

Parliament of Great Britain
Preceded by Charles Boone; Walter Sneyd	Member of Parliament for Castle Rising; 1790– 1794; With: Charles Boone	Succeeded by Charles Boone; Charles Bagot-Chester
