= Andrew Drummond (author) =

Scottish writer, translator and novelist (born 1952)

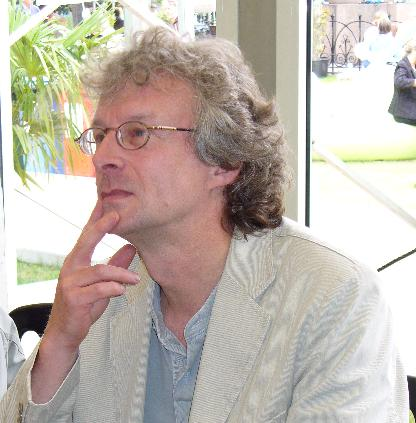
Andrew Drummond

Andrew Drummond is a Scottish writer, translator and novelist. He was born in Edinburgh and studied at the University of Aberdeen and the University of London. Previously employed full-time as a software engineer, he now pursues his writing full-time.

He is the author of five novels: An Abridged History of the Construction of a Railway Line Between Ullapool and Lochinver (2004); A Hand-book of Volapük (2006) set in 1890s Scotland; Elephantina (2008); Novgorod the Great (2010); and The Books of the Incarceration of the Lady Grange (2016). He has also written several short stories and some nonfiction translations from German. More recently, he has written a biography of the 18th century adventurer Maurice Benyovszky, entitled The Intriguing Life and Ignominious Death of Maurice Benyovszky (2017), and an account of the attempts to extend rail connections to the north-west Highlands of Scotland, A Quite Impossible Proposal: How Not to Build a Railway (2020). In 2024, his biography of the 16th century German radical preacher Thomas Müntzer was published, entitled The Dreadful History and Judgement of God on Thomas Müntzer: The Life and Times of an Early German Revolutionary.

== Bibliography ==
=== Books ===
- 2004. An Abridged History. Edinburgh: Polygon.
- 2006. A Hand-book of Volapük. Edinburgh: Polygon.
- 2008. Elephantina. Edinburgh: Polygon.
- 2010. Novgorod the Great. Edinburgh: Polygon.
- 2016. The Books of the Incarceration of the Lady Grange. Edinburgh.
- 2017. The Intriguing Life and Ignominious Death of Maurice Benyovszky. New York/London: Routledge.
- 2020. A Quite Impossible Proposal – How Not to Build a Railway. Edinburgh: Birlinn.
- 2024. The Dreadful History and Judgement of God on Thomas Müntzer: The Life and Times of an Early German Revolutionary. London/New York: Verso.

=== Short stories ===
- 2002. A Chronicle of the World 1840–1893. In: Writing Wrongs. Edinburgh: Canongate.
- 2012. Dr Calvin's Grand Illuminated Bestial Pleasure Dome In: Unfit for Eden, Postcripts Anthology 26/27. Hornsea: PS Publishing.
- 2013. The Providential Preservation of the Universal Bibliographic Repository. In: Memoryville Blues, Postcripts Anthology 30/31. Hornsea: PS Publishing.
- 2014. One Hundred Thousand Demons and the Cherub of Desire. In: Far Voyager, Postcripts Anthology 32/33. Hornsea: PS Publishing.

=== Translations (from German) ===
- 1983. Letters on Capital. London: New Park.
- 1991. And Red is the Colour of Our Flag. London: New Park.
- 1992. Trotsky and the Russian Social-Democratic Controversy over comparative revolutionary history. In: The Trotsky Reappraisal, Brotherstone e Dukes (red.). Edinburgh: Edinburgh University Press.
