= Henry Drummond (1730–1795) =

Scottish banker and politician (c.1730–1795)

Henry Drummond (1730–1795) was a British financier and politician who sat in the House of Commons from 1774 to 1790.

Drummond was the son of William Drummond, 4th Viscount Strathallan and his wife Margaret Murray, daughter of William Murray, 2nd Lord Nairne. He became an apprentice to his father's brother Andrew Drummond, a London banker. Henry Drummond handled a large amount of American business, and acted as financial agent for New Jersey in 1763. In 1759 he became army agent for the 42nd Foot and 46th Foot which were commanded by Murray relatives. By 1761 he was agent for the 87th Regiment commanded by Robert Murray Keith and the 89th Regiment commanded by Staats Long Morris. In 1765 he went into partnership with Richard Cox, and by 1771 the firm had 18 regiments on their books.

Drummond married Elizabeth Compton, daughter of Hon. Charles Compton and granddaughter of George Compton, 4th Earl of Northampton, at St James's Church in Piccadilly on 23 March 1761. In 1770 he took over from his cousin John Drummond as partner of Thomas Harley in the contract for army remittances to North America. John Drummond's health failed in 1772, and Robert Drummond persuaded Henry to give up his army agency business and return to the bank as third partner. Henry Drummond was a member of a social group, known as ‘The Gang’, which included Anthony Chamier, Lord Frederick Campbell, William Amherst, Sir John Sebright, Thomas Bradshaw, Rigby, Thomas Harley, and R. M. Keith.

Drummond purchased a parliamentary seat at Wendover from Lord Verney and was returned in 1774 in a by-election as Member of Parliament for Wendover. He then purchased a seat at Midhurst on the recommendation of Lord North and at the 1780 general election was returned as MP for Midhurst. He retired in 1790. There is no record of any speech by Drummond .

Drummond died on 24 June 1795. His son Henry was also a banker and MP.

Parliament of Great Britain
Preceded by John Adams; Joseph Bullock	Member of Parliament for Wendover; 1774–1780; With: Joseph Bullock; Thomas Dummer	Succeeded by Richard Smith; John Mansell Smith
Preceded by Hon. Henry Seymour-Conway; John Ord	Member of Parliament for Midhurst; 1780–1790; With: Hon. John St John; Sir Sampson Gideon; Benjamin Lethieullier; Edward Cotsford	Succeeded by Hon. Percy Wyndham; Hon. Charles Wyndham
