= Peter Robert Drummond =

Scottish businessman and biographer

Peter Robert Drummond (1802–1879) was a Scottish businessman and biographer.

== Life ==
Drummond, the son of a small farmer, was born and educated in the parish of Madderty, Perthshire, and in early life worked as a carpenter. He attained skill as a maker of picture-frames, and gained some knowledge of art. In later years he collected of pictures and engravings. While at Glasgow as assistant in the shop of an uncle, a provision merchant, his love of literature first developed itself.

Towards the close of 1832 he opened a circulating library at 15 High Street, Perth. During the same year he met Robert Nicoll, the poet, then apprenticed to Mrs. Robertson, a grocer, on the opposite side of the street. By Drummond's advice Nicoll gave up grocery and started a bookselling business in Dundee. A few years later Drummond was able to move to larger premises at 32 High Street, where he entered fully into the bookselling trade. He was here the means of introducing Jenny Lind, Giulia Grisi, and other famous singers to Perth audiences.

From 32 High Street Drummond moved to 46 George Street, and there started building what was later the Exchange Hotel. He intended to use the premises as a printing office, and perhaps to start a newspaper. He decided, however, to turn farmer, and completing the building as a hotel, he made over his bookselling business to his cousin John, and took the holding of Balmblair, in the parish of Redgorton, Perthshire, from Lord Mansfield. About 1859 he exhibited his collection of pictures in the Exchange Hall. By 1873 he had retired from farming, and started to write.

Drummond died suddenly at his house, Ellengowen, Almond Bank, about three miles to the north-west of Perth, on 4 September 1879, in his seventy-seventh year, and was buried at Wellshill cemetery, Perth, on the 9th.

== Works ==
A few days after Drummond's death appeared his Perthshire in Bygone Days: one hundred Biographical Essays, London, 1879. Another work, The Life of Robert Nicoll, poet, with some hitherto uncollected Pieces, Paisley (printed) and London, 1884, was edited by his son, James Drummond. His intention was to have issued with it a complete edition of Nicoll's poems when the copyright in the old edition had expired.

Drummond also wrote pamphlets on political and agricultural subjects, and contributed to The Scotsman and the Perth press. In 1850 he published a pamphlet entitled The Tenants and Landlords versus the Free Traders, by Powdavie, supporting the agricultural interest. An ingenious mechanic, Drummond gained a medal at the Great Exhibition of 1851 for a churn; he also invented an agricultural rake which received honourable mention at the exhibition of 1862.
