= Pete Drummond (drummer) =

Australian drummer and composer

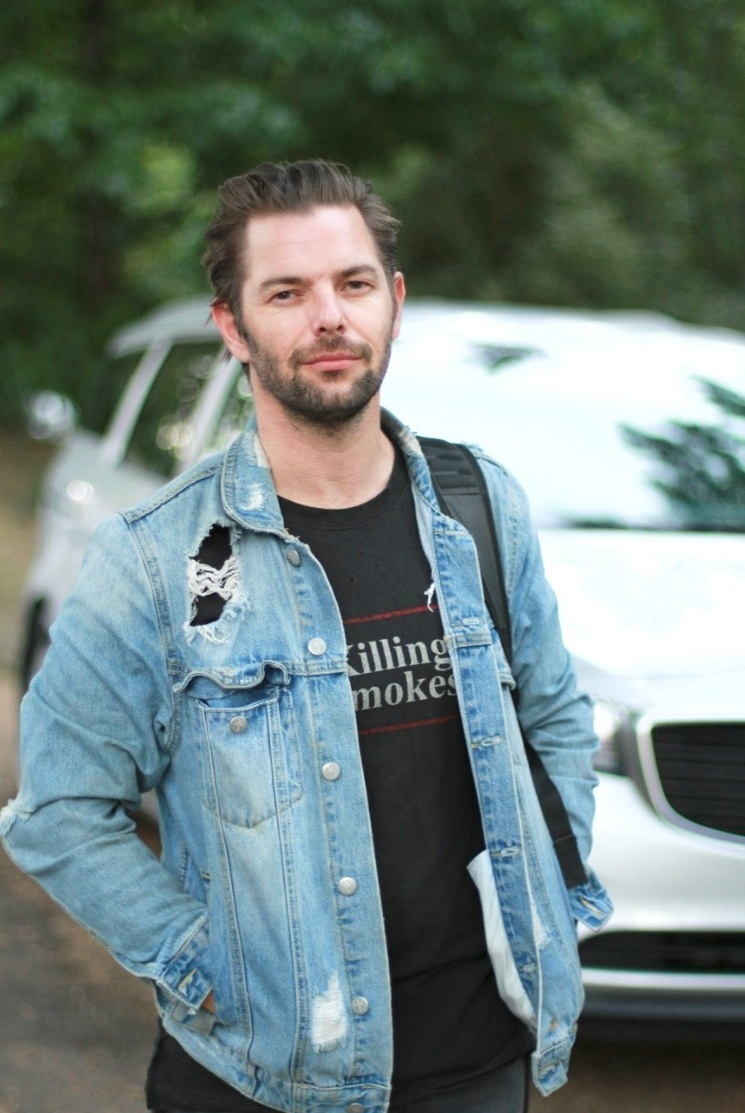

Background information
- Born: Australia
- Genres: Jazz fusion, progressive rock
- Occupations: Drummer, composer
- Instrument: Drums
- Years active: 1994–current
- Website: petedrummond.com.au

Pete Drummond is an Australian session drummer, composer, producer, multi-instrumentalist and educator who has developed a digital platform for drum lessons. Since 2006, Drummond has been associated with New Zealand band Dragon. He is known for his soundtrack work on The Killing Season (ABC), Living Universe (feature film); Search For Second Earth (ABC/BBC), and for his live solo performances alongside Virgil Donati, Thomas Lang, Mike Mangini, Dave Weckl, and many others.

Thomas Lang stated in Modern Drummer: “Pete Drummond is an amazing Australian drummer”.

== Early life ==
Drummond began drumming at three years of age. He started his formal training two years later with his mentor Jess Zappia. He later continued on his own, learning from recordings, instructional books, and videos.

== Career ==
=== Bands career ===
Drummond joined Dragon in 2006 when the band reformed after a nine-year hiatus. In 2008, he was enlisted into the ARIA Hall of Fame. He plays drums, keyboards and sings in the live shows with Dragon. He had previously performed with The Bushwackers, Joan Rivers (US Comedian), The Temptations, Jeremy Barnes (The World's Fastest Guitarist), Ricki Lee, Shannon Noll and Thirsty Merc.Dirt Cheap 1987

=== Career as a composer and songwriting ===
Drummond has worked as a composer and producer. ‘Not the Question’ (2002) was his debut album as arranger, mixer and producer. A few programs which feature Pete's music are ‘Crude: The Incredible Journey of Oil’, ‘Holy Switch’, ‘Ten Bucks a Litre’, ‘Inside The Inferno’, ‘Life On Us’, ‘Australia: A Time Traveler’s Guide’, ‘A Traveler’s Guide to the Planets’, and ABC's ‘The Killing Season’.

== Solo performer ==
In 2003, Drummond appeared at Australia's Ultimate Drummers Weekend. In 2012, he performed on Shannon Noll's ‘Switch Me On’. He played on the ARIA award-winning album ‘Homefires’ by Dead Ringer Band, ABC TV, NRL, and Channel 10. He has also released multiple international DVDs as a cover artist.

Drummond's solo album ‘Identity Crisis’ was launched in 2006. It contains eight original tracks of Jazz and Fusion, featuring Bill Risby, Jeremy Barnes, James Muller, Steve Weingart, and others.

In 2015 he played on Lee Kernaghan’s number one Australian album ‘Spirit of the Anzacs’.

In 2018 Drummond was featured in Australia's drumming publication DRUMscene.

== Discography ==
- Lee Kernaghan – Beautiful Noise (2012)
- Lee Kernaghan – Spirit of the Anzacs (2015)
- Dead Ringer Band – Homefires (1995)
- Dragon – Roses (2014)
- Pete Drummond – Identity Crisis (2006)

== Awards ==
- 1996 – Session Drummer on ARIA award-winning Homefires album
- 2011 – Legacy Award for Dragon
- 2011 – Vodafone Music Awards in New Zealand

== See also ==
- List of drummers
