= Andrew Drummond (banker) =

Scottish banker (1688–1769)

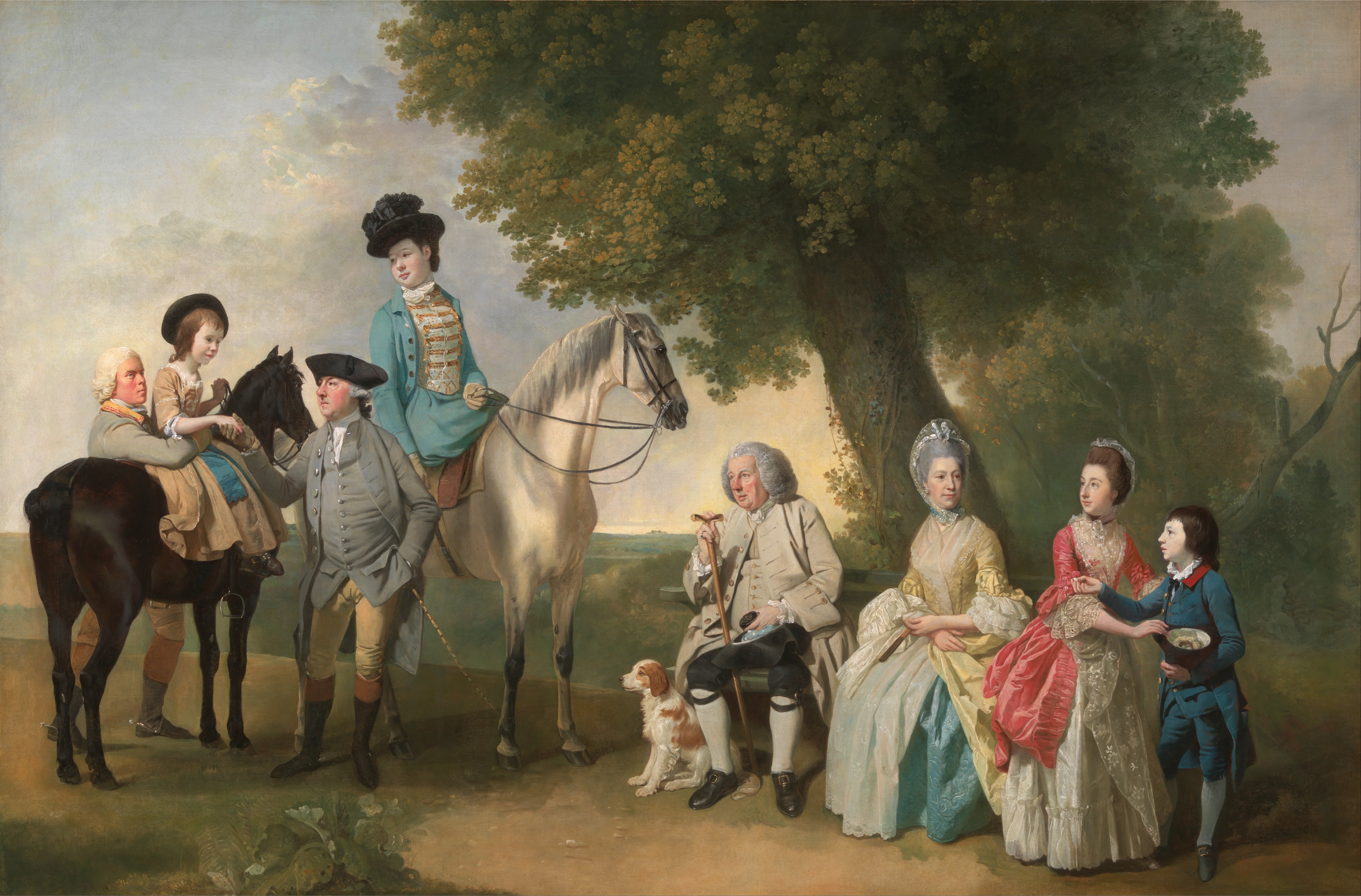
Drummond as the patriarch of his family - Johan Zoffany c. 1769

Andrew Drummond (1683–1769) was a Scottish banker and founder of Drummonds Bank in Charing Cross in London, now a part of the Royal Bank of Scotland.

Andrew Drummond was apprenticed as a goldsmith in Edinburgh but in about 1712 he set up his own goldsmiths business at the sign of the 'Golden Eagle' on the east side of Charing Cross in London. By 1717 banking had been added to goldsmithing and he became goldsmith banker attracted a growing clientele, especially expatriate Scots in London.

He was the fifth son of Sir John Drummond of Machany who had been outlawed in 1690 for his close links to the exiled family of the deposed King James II in France. The three eldest sons had died young, the eldest survivor, the fourth son, was William Drummond who came to inherit the Viscount title Strathallan, as 4th Viscount, from his young cousin, also William Drummond in 1711. His older and younger brothers both took an active part in the 1715 Jacobite rebellion and were made prisoners at Sheriffmuir. This seems to have had little effect on the Drummonds Bank business.

In 1716 Andrew Drummond married Isabella Strahan/Strachan (d. 1731), daughter of Alexander Strachan - a Charing Cross merchant from which union there was one son, John Drummond of Stanmore (1723–1774) and one daughter, Isabella Drummond.

In 1729 Andrew purchased the Stanmore estate in Middlesex. In 1745 the Young Pretender, Charles Edward Stuart raised his Standard at Glenfinnan and one of the first adherents to this new Jacobite rebellion was Andrew's older brother Strathallan, who went on to command the rebel forces in Scotland when the Prince invaded England and later commanded the reserve cavalry at the fateful battle of Culloden in April 1746, during which he was killed. The Strathallans were the subject of an Act of Attainder, the Attainder of Earl of Kellie and Others Act 1745 (19 Geo. 2. c. 26), and it caused the Drummond's Bank to temporarily cease trading.

After the Crown reviewed his confiscated records, they returned them and 12 days later Drummond Bank reopened for business using a new ledger. By that time, he had lost more than half of his accounts. Andrew had to publish a notification in London papers announcing not only the bank's re-opening but also his schedule for repayment of any debts by March 1746. Parliamentary records exonerating the bank stated the following: "In the History of Parliament account on the matter, it explicitly stated “…on suspicion of Jacobitism, the Government temporarily closed the bank, but Andrew Drummond vindicated his loyalty.”

Drummond died at Stanmore on 2 February 1769. The ownership of the bank passed to his son John Drummond of Stanmore and his nephew Robert Drummond of Cadland.

Drummonds Bank went on to become one of just two private banks to survive in London into the 20th century, when it was taken over by the Royal Bank of Scotland.
