= Robert Petre =

Robert Petre may refer to:

- Robert Petre (jockey) (1912–1996), English National Hunt racing jockey, during the 1930s and 1940s
- Robert Petre (footballer) (born 1997), Romanian footballer
- Robert Petre (died 1593), Puritan and MP for Fowey, Penry and Dartmouth
- Robert Petre, 3rd Baron Petre (1599–1638)
- Robert Petre, 7th Baron Petre (1689–1713)
- Robert Petre, 8th Baron Petre (1713–1742), horticulturist
- Robert Petre, 9th Baron Petre (1742–1801)
- Robert Petre, 10th Baron Petre (1763–1809)

== See also ==
- Robert Peter, American politician
