= Edmund Wright (d.1583) =

Arms of Wright of Sutton and Buckenham Tofts: Sable, a chevron engrailed between three fleurs-de-lys or on a chief of the last three spear heads azure

Edmund Wright (d. circa 1583) of Sutton Hall in the parish of Burnt Bradfield in Suffolk and of Buckenham Tofts in Norfolk (belonging to his father-in-law), was a Member of Parliament for Steyning in Sussex in 1559.

He was the second son and eventual heir of Robert Wright of Sutton by his wife Anne Russell, who had inherited a moiety of Sutton Hall from her mother Jane Jervace (or Gervas) (wife of Thomas Russell), daughter and heiress of John Jervace of Sutton. The arms of Wright were: Sable, a chevron engrailed between three fleurs-de-lys or on a chief of the last three spear heads azure.

Edmund Wright by his wife Frances Spring, a daughter of the prominent clothier Sir John Spring (d.1547) of Lavenham in Suffolk, left daughters and co-heiresses, one of whom was Anne Wright, heiress of Sutton Hall and of Barrett's Hall in Whatfield, who married Sir John Heigham of Barrough Hall. Edmund Wright sold the wardship of his nephew William Spring (1532/4-1599) to Margaret Donnington (d.1562), (Countess of Bath, wife of John Bourchier, 2nd Earl of Bath (1499-1560/61) of Tawstock in Devon), a strong-willed lady who was ambitious for her own daughters and who later married him off to one of them, namely Anne Kitson, from her previous marriage.

== Sources ==
- Fuidge, N.M., biography of "WRIGHT, Edmund (d.c.1583), of Burnt Bradfield and Sutton, Suff. and Little Buckenham, Norf.", published in History of Parliament, House of Commons 1558-1603, ed. P.W. Hasler, 1981
