= Thomas Walmsley (judge) =

Member of the Parliament of England

Sir Thomas Walmsley (also Walmesley and Walmisley) (1537–1612) was an English judge and politician.

== Life ==
He was the eldest son of Thomas Walmsley of Showley in the township of Clayton-le-dale and of Cunliffe in the township of Rishton, Lancashire, by his wife Margaret (born Livesey). He was admitted on 9 May 1559 student at Lincoln's Inn, where he was called to the bar on 15 June 1567, and elected bencher in 1574, autumn reader in 1576, Lent reader in 1577, and autumn reader again in 1580, in anticipation of his call to the degree of the coif, which, despite suspicions that he was a Catholic, took place about Michaelmas.

In 1583 Walmsley made before the Court of Common Pleas an attempt to sustain the validity of papal dispensations and other faculties issued during the reign of Mary I. He represented Lancashire in the parliament of 1588–9, and served on several committees. On 10 May 1589 he was created justice of the common pleas.

Walmsley early showed his independence by allowing bail in a murder case, contrary to the express injunctions of the Queen conveyed through the lord chancellor; his temerity provoked a reprimand. Southampton voted him its freedom on 6 February 1595. In 1597 he was assistant to the House of Lords in committee; he was placed on the ecclesiastical commission for Chester on 31 January 1598. He was also a member of the special commission before which Robert Devereux, 2nd Earl of Essex was arraigned at York House on 5 June 1600, and assisted the peers on his trial in Westminster Hall, 19–25 February 1601.

Continued in office on the accession of James I, Walmsley was knighted at Whitehall Palace on 23 July 1603. He was a member of the special commission that tried on 15 November following the Bye Plot conspirators. In Calvin's case Walmsley again showed independence: the matter was discussed by a committee of the House of Lords, with the help of the common-law bench, Francis Bacon, and other eminent counsel, in the painted chamber on 23 February 1607, and on the following day was decided in the affirmative by ten out of the twelve judges. Of the other two, one (Sir David Williams) was absent; Walmsley alone dissented. He adhered to his opinion on the subsequent argument in the exchequer chamber (Hilary term, 1608), and induced Sir Thomas Foster to concur in it.

During his judicial career Walmsley rode every circuit in England, except that of Norfolk and Suffolk. He amassed a large fortune, which he invested in broad acres in his native county. His principal seat was at Dunkenhalgh, near Blackburn, to which he retired on a pension towards the end of 1611. He died on 26 November 1612.

== Legacy ==
Walmsley's remains were interred in the chantry of our Lady, appendant to Dunkenhalgh manor, in the south aisle of Blackburn parish church. His monument, which was copied from that of Anne Seymour, Duchess of Somerset in St. Nicholas's Chapel, Westminster Abbey, was demolished by the insurgents at the outbreak of the First English Civil War. Another monument was erected in 1862. A full-length portrait of the judge and his lady was preserved in Dunkenhalgh House.

== Family ==
In right of his wife Anne (died 19 April 1635), daughter and heiress of Robert Shuttleworth of Hacking, Lancashire, Walmsley held the Hacking estates, which, with his own, passed to his only son, Thomas, who thus became one of the magnates of Lancashire. He was brought up in the Roman Catholic church. He subscribed at Oxford, 1 July 1613, but did not graduate. He was entered student at Gray's Inn on 11 November 1614, and was knighted on 11 August 1617. He died at Dunkenhalgh on 12 March 1642, having married twice and leaving issue by both wives. His posterity died out in the male line in 1711; but through the marriage of the last male descendant's youngest sister, Catherine Walmesley, with Robert Petre, 7th Baron Petre, her first husband, the female line represented the peerage; by her second husband, Charles Stourton, 15th Baron Stourton, she had no issue.
