= Buckenham Tofts =

Former civil parish in Norfolk, England

Coordinates: 52°31′13″N 0°42′27″E

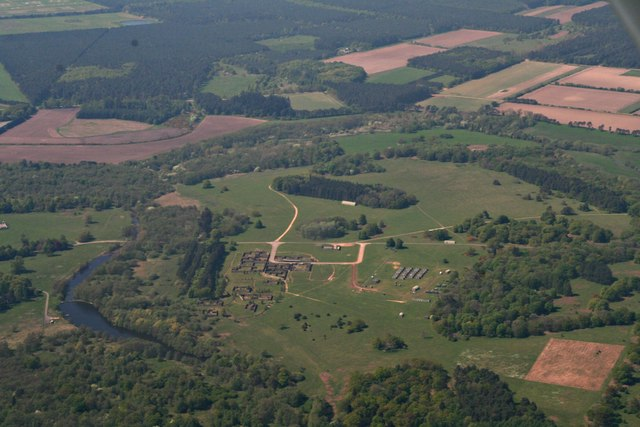
- Aerial view (looking westwards) of the parkland of the former Buckenham Tofts House. The mansion house, re-built in 1803 and demolished in 1946, stood to the immediate left (south) of the landscaped serpentine lake formed by damming a tributary of the River Wissey. Army training buildings are visible, including a mock-up of an Afghan village

- Location within Norfolk
- Civil parish: Stanford
- District: Breckland
- Shire county: Norfolk
- Region: East
- Country: England
- Sovereign state: United Kingdom

Buckenham Tofts House, circa 1920, as re-built in 1803 in the neo-classical style by Robert Edward Petre, 10th Baron Petre (1763–1809). Demolished 1946

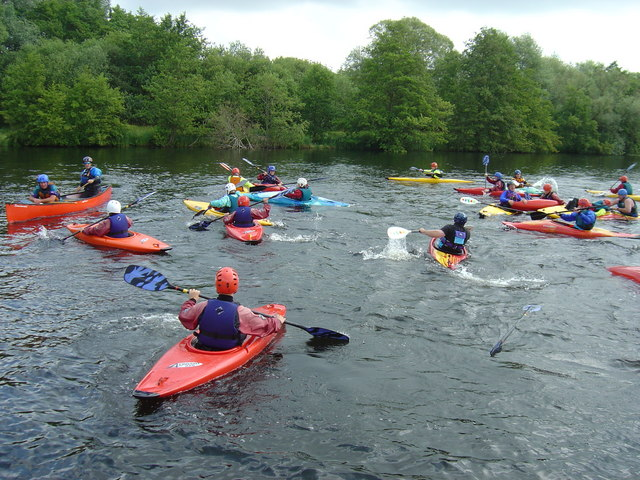
Soldiers relaxing on the serpentine lake at Buckenham Tofts after a day's training

Buckenham Tofts (or Buckenham Parva; Little Buckenham) is a former civil parish, now in the parish of Stanford, in the Breckland district of Norfolk, England. On 1 April 1935, the parish was abolished and merged with Stanford.

It was situated about one mile south of the small village of Langford, with its Church of St Andrew, and about one mile west of Stanford, with its All Saints' Church and one mile north of West Tofts, with its Church of St Mary, all deserted and demolished villages. None of these settlements (except West Tofts) are shown on modern maps but are simply replaced by "Danger Area" in red capital letters. In 1931, the parish had a population of 60.

== History ==
It is situated within Breckland heath, a large area of dry sandy soil unsuited to agriculture. The parish church of Buckenham Tofts, dedicated to St Andrew, was demolished centuries ago and stood to the immediate north of Buckenham Tofts Hall, the now-demolished manor house, as is evidenced by a graveyard which was discovered in that location. The parishioners, few as they were, used nearby St Mary's Church, West Tofts, one mile to the south, where survive 18th-century monuments to the Partridge family of Buckenham Tofts. In 1738 the Norfolk historian Blomefield stated of Buckenham Tofts "there is nothing remaining of this old village, but the Hall, and the miller's house". The ancient manor house was rebuilt in 1803 by the Petre family in the Georgian style and on a grand scale, was sold with the large estate in 1904 and was finally demolished by the army in 1946, having suffered major damage from military training exercises and shelling. In the early 21st century the remains of the manor house were described as follows: "a grassy platform of raised ground and beside a short line of dilapidated stone steps. The raised ground made a sort of elevated lawn, large enough for a tennis court or two, and the steps went to the top of the platform, and then went nowhere."

== Descent (Buckenham Tofts) ==
The Domesday Book of 1086 records two manors at this location, one held by Hugh de Montfort and the other by Roger, son of Renard.

=== Early holders ===
This lordship was held of the Montforts soon after the Conquest, by the de Bukenham family which took its name from the manor. William de Bukenham, son of Sir Ralph de Bukenham, had a charter for free-warren here, in Ellingham, and Illington, 38th Henry III and before this, in the 4th of King John, a fine was levied between William de Bukenham tenant, and Petronilla de Mortimer, petent, of the advowson of the church of Bukenham-Parva, and the moiety of a mill. In the 3rd year of King Edward I's reign Simon de Nevyle was lord, and had the assize of bread and beer of his tenants, and was patron of the church. In 1300, Hubert Hacon held it, and presented; after this, Margery, relict of Roger Cosyn of Elyngham-Magna, presented in 1313, as lady of the manor; and in 1323, John Polys of Wilton; but in 1337, Sir Simon de Hederset, Knt. was lord and patron, and 20th year of Edward III's reign. Sir John de Hederset, Edm. Le-Warde, and Edm. LeHall, held here and in Stanford half a quarter of a fee of Richard de Belhouse, as of his manor of Bodney, which Richard held it of the King. In the years 1349 and 1357, William de Hedersete was lord and patron, but soon after, it was in the hands of Richard Gegge of Saham Toney, who presented to the church in 1367. In 3rd Henry IV, Richard Gegge and Edmund de Hall held here, and in Stanford, half a quarter of a fee of John Reymes, as of his manor of Bodney, and in this family of Gegge it continued till about the reign of Edward IV, when it came to John Austeyn, Esq. by the marriage of Margaret Gegge, one of the daughters and coheirs of Rich. Gegge, Esq. After this, in Easter term, 17th Henry VII. a fine was levied between Thomas Spring, and others, querents, and Margaret Austeyn widow, defendant, of this manor, with lands in Stanford and Linford; and in Michaelmas term, in the 23d of the said King, another fine was levied between Thomas Spring and others, querents, and Hugh Coo, and Ann his wife, defendants, which Ann was daughter of John Austeyn, and Margaret his wife.

=== Spring (& Wright) ===
Arms granted during the reign of King Henry VIII (1509–1547) to "Thomas Spring of Lavenham": Argent, on a chevron between three mascles gules as many cinquefoils or

Arms of Wright of Sutton and Buckenham Tofts: Sable, a chevron engrailed between three fleurs-de-lys or on a chief of the last three spear heads azure

==== Sir John Spring (d.1547) ====
Sir John Spring (d.1547), knighted by King Henry VIII, died lord of the manor of Buckenham Tofts. He was the son and heir of Thomas Spring (c.1474–1523) "an opulent clothier" and one of the richest men in England, by his wife Anne King. Thomas Spring (d.1523) was the son of Thomas Spring (d.1486) whose monumental brass in Lavenham Church states that he built the vestry. The will of Thomas Spring (d.1523) makes bequests to "the friars of Thetford and the nuns of Thetford". Sir John Spring (d.1547) married Dorothy Waldegrave, daughter of William Waldegrave (d.1554) of Smallbridge in Suffolk, by whom he had a son and heir William Spring (d.1599) and two daughters:

- Frances Spring, who married Edmund Wright (d.1583) of Sutton Hall in the parish of Burnt Bradfield in Suffolk, a Member of Parliament for Steyning in Sussex in 1559 (a seat controlled by the Duke of Norfolk) who became seated at Buckenham Tofts, his father-in-law's manor. He was the second son and eventual heir of Robert (or Edmund) Wright of Sutton by his wife Jane Russell, a niece of John Russell, 1st Earl of Bedford (1485–1555). Sutton Hall had been inherited by Jane Russell from her mother Jane Jervace (or Gervas) (wife of Thomas Russell), daughter and heiress of John Jervace of Sutton. The arms of Wright were: Sable, a chevron engrailed between three fleurs-de-lys or on a chief of the last three spear heads azure. Edmund Wright by his wife Frances Spring left daughters and co-heiresses, one of whom was Anne Wright, heiress of Sutton Hall and of Barrett's Hall in Whatfield, who married Sir John Heigham of Barrough Hall. Edmund Wright sold the wardship of his nephew William Spring (1532/4–1599) to Margaret Donnington (Countess of Bath) (see below).
- Bridget Spring, who married firstly Thomas Fleetwood, and secondly to Sir Robert Wingfield of Letheringham.

==== William Spring (1532/4–1599) ====
Arms of Kitson: Sable, three fishes hauriant in fess argent a chief or

William Spring (1532/4–1599), son and heir, who was a minor aged 13 at his father's death. One year later in 1548 (or in 1551) King Edward VI granted his wardship and marriage to his uncle Edmund Wright "of Bradfield" and of Buckenham Tofts, who sold his marriage, for the sum of 400 marks, to Margaret Donnington (d.1562), (Countess of Bath), a strong-willed lady who was ambitious for her children. Very recently, on 4 December 1548 she had married (as her third husband and as his third wife) John Bourchier, 2nd Earl of Bath (1499–1560/61) of Tawstock in Devon. She was the daughter and sole heiress of John Donnington (died 1544) of Stoke Newington, a member of the Worshipful Company of Salters, and was the widow successively of Sir Thomas Kitson (died 1540), the builder of Hengrave Hall in Suffolk, and next of Sir Richard Long (died 1546) of Wiltshire, Great Saxham and Shingay, Cambridgeshire, a Gentleman of the Privy Chamber to King Henry VIII. Margaret Donnington insisted that at the same time as her marriage to Bourchier, his son and heir should marry her own daughter Frances Kitson. The double marriage took place at Hengrave on 11 December 1548. Her other daughter Anne Kitson she provided for similarly by marrying her to her newly purchased ward, William Spring (1532/4–1599) of Lavenham. William received livery of his estates in 1553 (on reaching his majority and exiting wardship) and was afterwards knighted. His first wife Anne Kitson having died (after having produced his son and heir), he married secondly to Susan Jermyn, a daughter of Sir Ambrose Jermyn. He died seized of the manors of Buckenham Tofts, and in Suffolk of Pakenham, Cockfield-Hall and Whatfield, amongst many others. His son and heir (by Anne Kitson) was:

==== John Spring (1559–1601) ====
John Spring (1559–1601) who married Mary Trelawny, a daughter of Sir John Trelawny of Trelawny in Cornwall. He died shortly after his father and left a son and heir Sir William Spring (1588–1638) of Pakenham, MP, then aged 12, whose son was Sir William Spring, 1st Baronet (1613–1654), MP, created a baronet in 1641.

=== Rich ===
Arms of Rich: Gules, a chevron between three crosses botonée or

In the reign of King James I it was held by the Rich family and in 1614 Sir Robert Rich (1559–1619) (afterwards Robert Rich, 3rd Baron Rich, 1st Earl of Warwick) presented as lord; His son Robert Rich, 2nd Earl of Warwick (1587–1658) "of Buckenham Tofts" served as "Lieutenant of Norfolk", evidenced by Ewing (1837) by the fact that "upon a small full length print of him, is said to be his Majesty's Lieutenant of Norfolk, Essex, etc. but without the prefix of Lord, his name is considered to be inadmissible on this list (of Lord Lieutenants)". He married Frances Hatton, the daughter of Sir William Hatton, Knight, and grand daughter of Sir Francis Gawdy, Knight, Chief Justice of the Common Pleas, and became lord of the manor of Barton Bendish and other manors, about 1610.

=== Crane, Appleton ===
Sir Robert Crane, 1st Baronet (1586–1643) of Chilton, near Sudbury in Suffolk also had his residence at Buckenham Tofts. He was 6 times an MP for Sudbury and twice for the county seat of Suffolk. He died without leaving a male heir, but left four daughters as co-heiresses. His mural monument, with kneeling effigies of himself and his two wives, survives in St Mary's Church, Chilton. His second wife Susan Alington, a daughter of Sir Giles Alington of Horseheath, Cambridgeshire, survived him and remarried to Isaac Appleton (1606–61), of Holbrook Hall, Little Waldingfield, Suffolk, a Member of Parliament for Sudbury in Suffolk in 1661, who resided at Buckenham Tofts until the second year of the reign of King Charles II, in which he died intestate after which his estates were divided between his three sisters. Buckenham Tofts was then conveyed to Samuel Vincent by Robert Fairford, Isaac Preston and Mr. Cradock.

=== Vincent ===
Arms of Samuel Vincent: Azure, three quatrefoils argent

Samuel Vincent acquired the estate and in about 1670/80 rebuilt the manor house as a typical Restoration-style house, as is depicted on an estate map circa 1700, held by the Norfolk Record Office. Vincent's house was still standing in 1738, when Blomefield commented on it as follows:

"A neat pile of brick, on the summit whereof is a lofty lantern or turret, and on the top of this house he (being a very great humorist) erected a fish-pond, with a bason of lead to contain the water, and had pipes of lead which brought water by an engine from a canal in the gardens, into every room (as it is said) of the house: he also built an elegant stable, and other offices, and made a park".

It was surrounded by walled formal gardens, typical of the period, as shown on the map of 1700. The grounds included a canal, a garden building (possibly incorporating the remnant of the mediaeval parish church), parterres and topiary. Samuel Vincent was an entrepreneur and land speculator in London, who was associated with the great and unscrupulous Nicholas Barbon, a self-made man who "dominated the late 17th century London building world". The Great Fire of London in 1666 had opened up great opportunities for building developers. Vincent was a pioneer in the field of insurance and in 1681, together with Barbon and ten other associates (including John Parsons and Felix Calvert), he established the "Fire Insurance Office", which provided insurance for 5,000 houses. Barbon explained the principle of the business as follows to a correspondent in 1684:

"The fund or securities are these: that of the Fire Office is ground rents to the Value of fifty thousand pounds, setled upon trustees, to make good all losses from fire; and to be increased, as the number of houses insured increase. The strength of this security stands upon this supposition, that the fund is so large, considering the houses insured are dispersed at several distances, that it is very improbable (unless the whole City be destroyed at once) that any loss at one time should exceed the fund; and then it will be alwayes the interest of the insurers (as of men that have Morgaged their Land for less than the Value) to pay the debt when called for, to prevent a greater loss, since the land is of more value than the debt".

In 1686 the company (described as "The Fire Office" or "Samuel Vincent, Nicholas Barbon and their partners for the insurance of houses from fire") sought to obtain a patent for the exclusive use of the "invention" of fire insurance. In 1688 it was granted a patent or incorporation papers by King James II and adopted the symbol of a phoenix to be displayed as a "fire mark" on all insured houses, which would be recognised by its fleet of fire-engines in case of a fire breaking out. In 1705 it adopted the name "Phoenix Office".

"Samuel Vincent of Buckingham House in Norfolk, Esquire" bore arms: Azure, three quatrefoils argent, as recorded in Essay to Heraldry by Richard Blome, published in 1684. These arms were also the arms of Sir Anthony Vincent, 4th Baronet (c. 1645–1674) of Stoke d'Abernon in the County of Surrey. Vincent mortgaged the estate to Sir Thomas Meers and eventually Buckenham Tofts was acquired by Robert Partridge (d.1710).

=== Partridge ===
Mural monument to Henry III Partridge (1671–1733) of Buckenham Tofts House, St Mary's Church, West Tofts. He inherited the estate from his brother Robert Partridge (d.1710), who had purchased Buckenham Tofts

Mural monument to Elizabeth Partridge (1721–1754), wife of Rev. Samuel Knight and 5th daughter of Henry III Partridge, St Mary's Church, West Tofts

==== Robert Partridge (d.1710) ====
Robert Partridge (d.1710) purchased Buckenham Tofts. He was the eldest son of Henry II Partridge (1636–1670) of Lowbrooke in the parish of Bray, Berkshire, Sheriff of Berkshire in 1670, by his wife Joanna Jaques, a daughter and co-heiress of Robert Jaques of Elmestone in Kent, Alderman of the City of London and Sheriff of Kent in 1669, by his wife Joanna Foy, daughter and heiress of William Foy.

The earliest recorded ancestor of the Partridge family is Henry I Partridge (1604–1666) (father of Henry II) of Lowbrooke, an Alderman of the City of London and member of the Worshipful Company of Coopers, whose monument with acrostic verse survives in St Michael's Church, Bray. He purchased the manor of Lowbrooke as property sequestrated by Parliament from Sir William Englefield of Catterington, in the County of Southampton, a recusant who had failed to pay his composition.

==== Henry III Partridge (1671–1733) ====
Henry III Partridge (1671–1733) of the parish of St. Andrew, Holborn, City of London, was the second son of Henry II and heir to his brother Robert Partridge (d.1710) of Buckenham Tofts and Lowbrooke. He married, firstly, in 1701 to 15-year-old Elizabeth Holder (d.1703), only daughter and sole heiress of Thomas Holder of Northwold in Norfolk (about 7 miles north-west of Buckenham Tofts) (by his wife Bridget Graves, a daughter of the antiquary Richard Graves (1677–1729), of Mickleton, Gloucestershire) who died 2 years later aged 17, by whom he had no issue, but from whom he managed nevertheless to inherit Northwold. Secondly, he married Martha Wright (d.1760), eldest daughter of John Wright, merchant. Henry III's mural monument survives in St Mary's Church, West Tofts, as does one to his fifth daughter Elizabeth Partridge (1721–1754), wife of Rev. Samuel Knight, who bore the arms Argent, three pales gules in a bordure engrailed azure on a canton gules a spur or, of the family founded by the wealthy ironmaster Richard Knight (1659–1745) of Downton Hall, Herefordshire.

==== Henry IV Partridge (1711–1793) ====
Monument to Henry IV Partridge (1711–1793) of Northwold "late of Buckenham House and formerly of Lowbrooks". St George's Church, Methwold, Norfolk

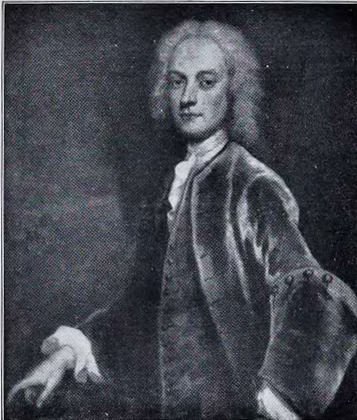
Henry Partridge (1711-1793), portrait by John Vanderbank

Henry IV Partridge (1711–1793) of Northwold, "late of Buckenham House and formerly of Lowbrooks", was the eldest son and heir of Henry III Partridge. He was a Bencher of the Middle Temple and Recorder of Lynn, as is stated on his monument in St George's Church, Methwold (2 miles south-west of Northwold). In about 1736 he sold Buckenham Tofts to Hon. Philip Howard (1687/8–1749/50). Henry (VI) Samuel Partridge (1782–1858), grandson of Henry IV, sold Lowbrooks and in 1810 purchased Hockham Hall in the parish of Great Hockham, Norfolk (7 miles east of Buckenham Tofts) from James Dover, where his descendants resided until shortly before 1937, in which year they still held the lordship of the manor of Northwold. Three good 18th-century memorials to the Partridge family of Buckenham Tofts survive in the nave of St Mary's Church, West Tofts (1 mile south of Buckenham Tofts). The arms of Partridge were: Gules, on a fess cotised between three partridges rising or as many torteaux (shown as falcons but blazoned by Burke as "partridges"); Crest: a partridge [sic] rising or.

=== Howard ===
Arms of Howard: Gules, on a bend between six cross-crosslets fitchy argent an escutcheon or charged with a demi-lion rampant pierced through the mouth by an arrow within a double tressure flory counterflory of the first

In 1736 the estate of Buckenham Tofts was purchased by Hon. Philip Howard (1687/8–1749/50), youngest son of Lord Thomas Howard (son of Henry Howard, 6th Duke of Norfolk and Lady Anne Somerset) and Mary Elizabeth Savile and younger brother of Edward Howard, 9th Duke of Norfolk (1686–1777). He was resident at Buckenham Tofts in 1738, at the time Blomefield published his Essay Towards A Topographical History of the County of Norfolk. As a Roman Catholic he was largely excluded from serving in public life. His will dated 1745, in which he calls himself "Philip Howard of Buckenham House in the County of Norfolk", directed his body "to be interred at the family burying place at Arundel Church in Sussex after as private and decent manner as possible", signifying the Collegiate Church of the Holy Trinity, now known as the Fitzalan Chapel, next to the family seat of Arundel Castle. He married twice:

- Firstly on 7 January 1723/24 to Winifrede Stonor, daughter of Thomas Stonor by his wife Hon. Winifred Roper (a daughter of Christopher Roper, 5th Baron Teynham), by whom he had progeny:
  - Thomas Howard (1727/8–1763), who died in 1763 in Paris while on the grand tour, who had been heir presumptive to the dukedom following his father's death.
  - Winifred Howard (1726–1753), a co-heiress (in her issue) of her uncles Thomas Howard, 8th Duke of Norfolk and Edward Howard, 9th Duke of Norfolk, to the titles Baron Mowbray, Baron Segrave, and many others. She married William Stourton, 16th Baron Stourton (1704–1781).
- Secondly he married (as her second husband) Henrietta Blount (d.1782), widow of Peter Proli of Antwerp and a daughter and co-heiress of Edward Blount (d.1726) of Blagdon in the parish of Paignton in Devon. Her younger sister Mary Blount (1701/2–1773), had in 1727 married Edward Howard, 9th Duke of Norfolk (1686–1777), Philip's elder brother. By Henrietta he had progeny:

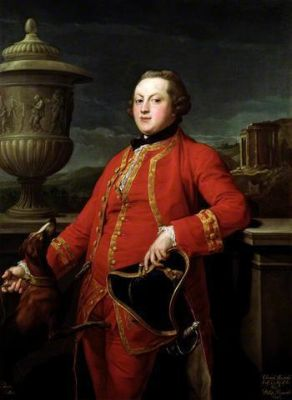
Edward Howard (1743/4–1767), son of Henrietta Blount and heir presumptive to the dukedom of Norfolk, who died aged 23. Portrait by Pompeo Batoni

  - Edward Howard (1743/4–1767), only son, who in 1763 became heir presumptive to the dukedom (the premier dukedom of England) following the death of his half-brother. He was a special favourite of his childless aunt and uncle Mary Blount and her husband the 9th Duke, both blood relatives, who expected him to inherit the dukedom and considered him as their own child. The couple were devastated when he died in 1767, aged 23, due to a fever he caught while playing tennis not fully recovered from measles. The Duchess was affected "almost to distraction and she never recovered from the blow". All building at the palatial new house planned at Worksop was cancelled as the couple realised that their next heir was a distant male cousin they hardly knew and who was a "depressing" contrast to Edward.
  - Anne Howard (1742–1787), only daughter, who married Robert Petre, 9th Baron Petre (1742–1801), but who as a female was excluded from inheriting the Dukedom of Norfolk by a recent entail effected by the Act of Restoration 1664. Thus Buckenham Tofts passed to the Petre family.

=== Petre ===
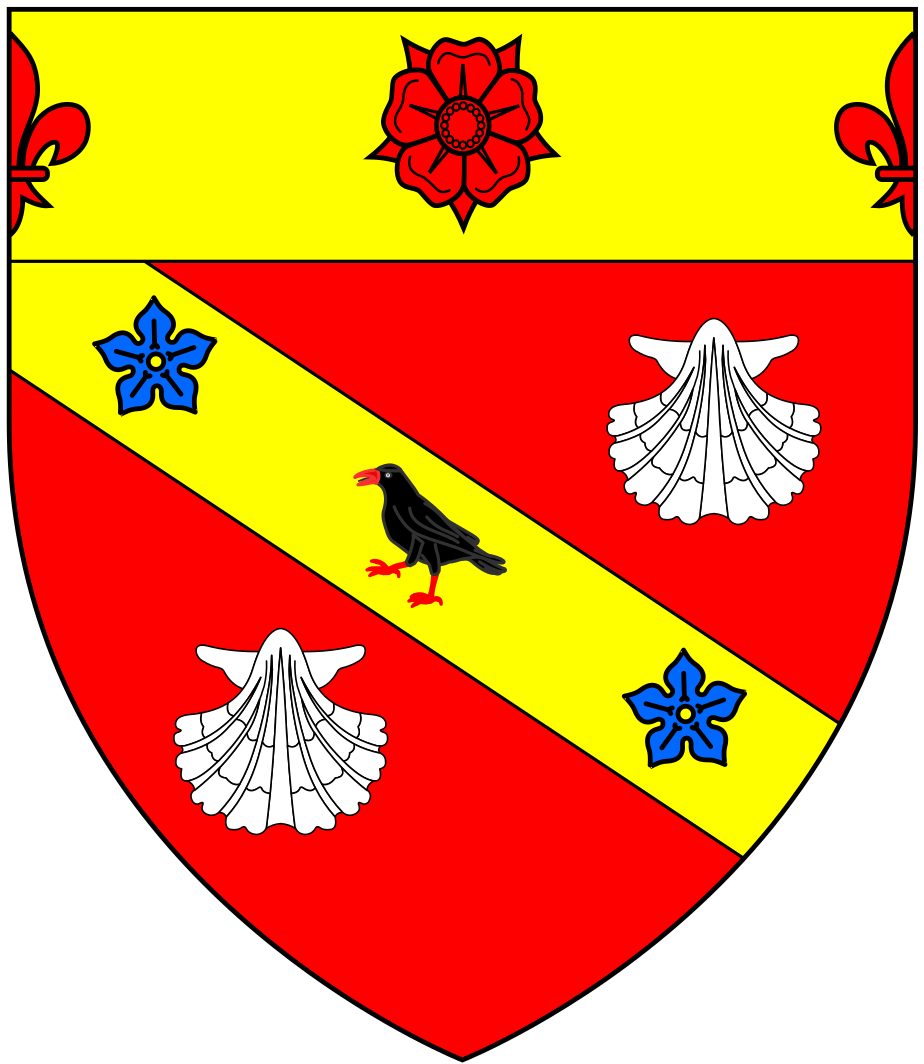
Arms of Petre: Gules, on a bend or between two escallops argent a Cornish chough proper between two cinquefoils azure on a chief of the second a rose between two demi-fleurs-de-lis palewise of the first

==== Robert Petre, 9th Baron Petre (1742–1801) ====
Buckenham Tofts descended by marriage to the Roman Catholic Robert Petre, 9th Baron Petre (1742–1801), husband of Anne Howard (1742–1787). By 1797 he had expanded the deer park from 90 to 600 acres, with landscaping of trees and a serpentine lake created by damming a tributary of the River Wissey. In 1787 he obtained licence to close several public roads crossing the parkland. In 1796 Nathaniel Kent wrote:

Lord Petre has planted with great taste and success 700 acres at Buckenham House ... the park which is in the midst of a barren, dreary country, forms an agreeable shady retreat, covered with pleasant verdure richly ornamented with forest trees of large dimensions.

In 1790 the parliamentary constituency of Thetford, in which Buckenham Tofts lay, was a rotten borough controlled by the two largest local landowners, the 4th Duke of Grafton, who was also the Recorder, and the 9th Baron Petre, disbarred from serving in public office due to his religion.

==== Robert Petre, 10th Baron Petre (1763–1809) ====
In 1803 the house was rebuilt as a seven by seven bay structure by Robert Edward Petre, 10th Baron Petre (1763–1809) to the designs of the architect Samuel Wyatt. In 1802 Bodney Hall, on the northern part of the estate, was inhabited by refugee nuns of Montargis, fleeing the French Revolution.

==== William Petre, 11th Baron Petre (1793–1850) ====
In 1822 William Petre, 11th Baron Petre (1793–1850) sold out his interest in the borough of Thetford, and also at about this time the estate of Buckenham Tofts, to the banker Alexander Baring, whose family subsequently used their control over the electors to have themselves selected as MPs on many occasions.

=== Baring ===
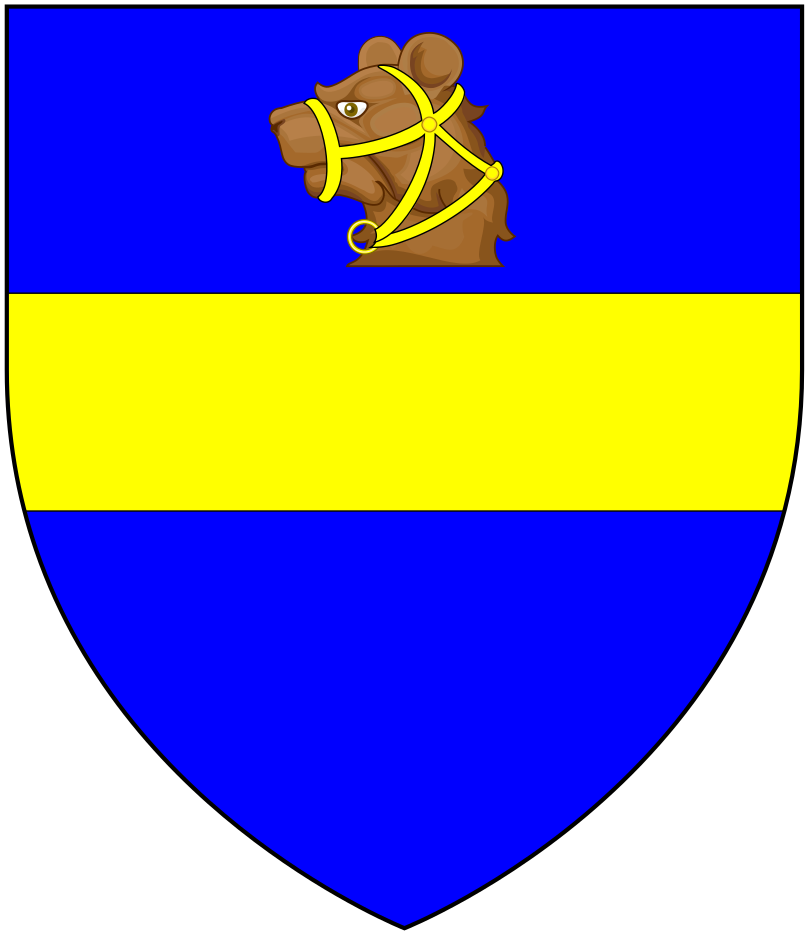
Canting arms of Baring: Azure, a fesse or in chief a bear's head proper muzzled and ringed of the second

==== Alexander Baring, 1st Baron Ashburton (1774–1848) ====
In 1821 the estate was purchased by Alexander Baring, 1st Baron Ashburton (1774–1848), raised to the peerage in 1835, the second son of Francis Baring, 1st Baronet (1740–1810), a partner in Barings Bank, in 1818 deemed "the sixth great European power", after England, France, Prussia, Austria and Russia. The 1st Baronet was born at Larkbeare House near Exeter in Devon, 3rd son of Johann Baring (1697–1748), a German cloth merchant who had settled in England, by his English wife Elizabeth Vowler. Alexander nominated successively both his sons as MPs for the second of the two seats for Thetford, namely Bingham Baring, the eldest son and heir, being elected in 1826, followed by Francis Baring, the younger son, in 1830. Alexander himself followed Francis, serving as MP in 1831. He resided at Buckenham Tofts occasionally, with Francis. His other seats were The Grange, near Northington, Hampshire, and Ashburton in Devonshire. He and his descendants were many times Members of Parliament for Thetford. He died in 1848 and was succeeded by his eldest son Bingham Baring.

==== Bingham Baring, 2nd Baron Ashburton (1799–1864) ====
Bingham Baring, 2nd Baron Ashburton (1799–1864) married Lady Harriet Montagu, eldest daughter of George Montagu, 6th Earl of Sandwich. Bingham served as MP for Thetford in 1826 and 1841. The 2nd Baron died in 1864 and was succeeded by his younger brother Francis.

==== Francis Baring, 3rd Baron Ashburton (1800–1868) ====
In 1864 Francis Baring, 3rd Baron Ashburton (1800–1868) inherited the titles and estates of his elder brother, having served as MP for Thetford in 1830, 1832 and 1848. He married Hortense Maret (c. 1812–1882), daughter of Hughes-Bernard Maret, 1st Duc de Bassano, the Prime Minister of France. The couple lived in Paris. Alexander Baring, 4th Baron Ashburton (1835–1889), son of the 3rd Baron, during his father's life was elected unopposed for Thetford at a by-election in December 1857 and was re-elected in 1859 and 1865, and held the seat until he succeeded to the peerage in 1868 on the death of his father. In 1864 Alexander was appointed a Deputy Lieutenant of the County of Norfolk. In 1869 his mother the newly widowed Hortense (Lady Ashburton) sold Buckenham Tofts to William Amhurst Tyssen-Amherst, 1st Baron Amherst of Hackney.

=== Tyssen-Amherst ===
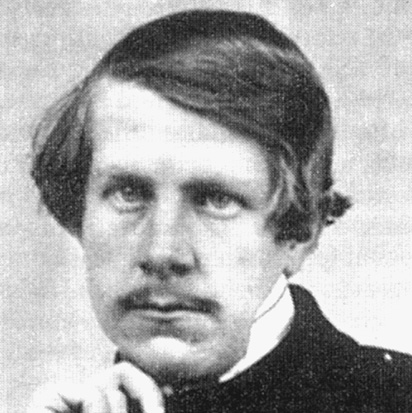
William Amhurst Tyssen-Amherst, 1st Baron Amherst of Hackney (1835–1909), who purchased Buckenham Tofts in 1869 and in 1906 was ruined by the fraud of his land agent

In 1869 Buckenham Tofts was sold by Lady Ashburton, complete with furniture, to William Amhurst Tyssen-Amherst, 1st Baron Amherst of Hackney (1835–1909), who also owned Didlington Hall (4 miles north-west of Buckenham Tofts), where he kept his valuable art collection, including objects from ancient Egypt. He had served as High Sheriff of Norfolk in 1866 and served as MP for West Norfolk (1880–5) and for South-West Norfolk (1885–1892). He was descended in the male line from the Daniel family, originally MacDaniel "of good repute in County Mayo, Irland, in the 17th century", and in a female line from Francis Tyssen (c.1625-99) of Flushing in Holland, who owned plantations in Antigua in the West Indies, and who in 1685 purchased the estate of Shacklewell in Hackney. The latter's great-grandson Francis John Tyssen (d. 1781) left the reversion of his estate to his illegitimate daughter Mary (d. 1800) wife of Capt. John Amhurst, RN, of Court Lodge, East Farleigh, Kent, whose daughter Amelia Amhurst in 1794 married William George Daniel (d.1838) of Foulden Hall in Norfolk, of Westbrooke House, Upwey, Dorset and of Foley House, Maidstone, Kent, High Sheriff of Kent in 1825, who in 1814 adopted the surname Daniel-Tyssen and became the largest landowner in Hackney. His son and heir was William George Tyssen Daniel-Tyssen (d.1885) of Foulden Hall in Norfolk, who in 1852 adopted the surname Tyssen-Amhurst and at about the same time purchased Didlington Hall, one mile south-east of Foulden. His son was the 1st Baron, who changed the spelling of his surname to Tyssen-Amherst.

In 1906 he was ruined by a fraud perpetrated by Charles Cheston his solicitor and land agent in Hackney who had managed the construction of much of Dalston and Stoke Newington on his behalf and was a trustee and treasurer of the East London Hospital for Children. Over time he had gambled £250,000 (now about £25 million) of Lord Amherst's assets on the Stock Exchange and the losses were discovered following Cheston's suicide on 8 May 1906. Lord Amherst was forced to sell a large part of his remaining assets to cover the loss and the subsequent law-suit he was subjected to by his mother's family the Fountaines of Narford Hall in Norfolk, whose trustee he was. It appears, however, that the estate of Buckenham Tofts had already been advertised for sale in 1904 as: "The Buckenham Tofts Estate, near Brandon, a grand sporting and residential estate", and included the following lots: Buckenham Hall, Stanford; Gardens, Buckenham Hall; Glasshouses, Conservatory, Mound Cottages; Bodney Warren Lodge, Buckenham Hall, Hilborough; Buckenham Home Farm, Stanford; Bodney Lodge Farm, Hilborough; Bodney Hall Farm, Bodney, Hilborough; Bodney Hall, Bodney, Hilborough; Stables, Bodney Hall; Red Buildings, Hilborough. The 1st Baron died in 1909, of apoplexy probably caused by his financial problems, six weeks after the first auction of his art collection by Sotheby's, his probate valuing his net assets at just £341. He was buried at Didlington, and having died without a male heir, he left six daughters, of whom the eldest was Mary Tyssen-Amherst (1857–1919), who succeeded to his title by special remainder. She was the wife of Lord William Cecil, a younger son of the Marquess of Exeter. In 1910 Mary sold Didlington Hall to Colonel Herbert Francis Smith and moved back to their more modest house at Foulden. Buckenham Tofts was eventually sold to Edward Steane Price. During WWI the house was operated as a hospital for wounded soldiers, by the 1st Baron's widow, Margaret Susan Mitford (1835–1919) and their unmarried daughters, especially Sybil (born 1858), and Florence (born 1860).

== Evacuation ==
During the Second World War, the manor house was taken over by the British Army when it was incorporated into the 30,000-acre Stanford Battle Area. The military ranges were needed to prepare Allied infantry for Operation Overlord, the Battle of Normandy in 1944. It remains a prohibited area and access is not allowed without special permission from the Army, given only in exceptional circumstances.

=== Demolition 1946 ===
The house was demolished in 1946, due to damage from military training, shelling or possibly after a fire. Wyatt's stables, a three bay pedimented block with cupola, were demolished in the 1980s.

== Descent (Buckenham Parva) ==
The other lordship was held at the time of the Domesday Book by Roger, son of Renard, who had a carucate of land, and 20 acres, valued at 11s. This soon after came to the Earl Warren, and was held of him by the ancient family of Mortimer of Atleburgh; and in the reign of Henry III John Langetot was found to hold half a quarter of a fee of Sir Robert de Mortimer, and he of the Earl Warren, and the Earl of the King. In 34th Edward I Nicholas de Langetot, and Margery his wife, had it; but in 9th Edward II. Henry de Walpole was lord, a fine being levied in the 7th of that King, between Henry de Walpole and Alice his wife, querents, and Nicholas Langetot and Margery his wife, deforciants, by virtue of which it was settled on Henry and Alice for life, remainder to Simon and Thomas, their sons, in tail. In the 20th Edward III Sir John de Hederset and Jeffrey de Hall held it of Sir Constantine de Mortimer, he of the Earl Warren, and the Earl of the King. In 3rd Henry IV it was in the hands of Richard Gegge, and so became united to the other manor.

== Inspected by Prince Albert ==
It is said that the estate was considered by Prince Albert as a Norfolk home and shooting estate for his eldest son Albert Edward, Prince of Wales, but in the end Sandringham was preferred.

== St Andrew's Church ==
Blomefield (1738) commented: "The Church has been so long demolished, that the very site of it is not known; it is said to be about the upper end of the canal in the gardens, near the garden-house; it was dedicated to St. Andrew, and there was in it the image of our Lady, as appears from an old will that I have seen, wherein a legacy was given to repair her perke" (a pedestal and niche that she stood in).

== Sources ==
- Francis Blomefield, An Essay Towards A Topographical History of the County of Norfolk: Volume 2, London, 1805 edition (first published 1738), pp. 266–271, Hundred of Grimeshou: Bukenham-Parva, or Little-Bukenham'
