= Lavenham Revolt =

1525 protest in England

- Part of the resistance to the Amicable Grant
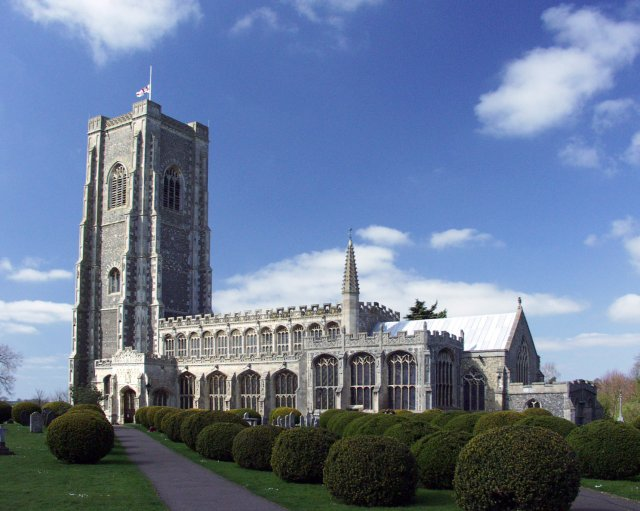
- Lavenham church where the bells were not rung
- Date: 1525
- Location: Lavenham, Suffolk, England
- Caused by: Opposition to the Amicable Grant (forced loan)
- Methods: Taxpayer strike and armed protest
- Result: Rebellion suppressed; Amicable Grant abandoned

Parties
Rebels of Suffolk and neighbouring counties	Tudor government

Lead figures
Local taxpayers and artisans	Duke of Norfolk, Duke of Suffolk, Sir John Spring, Cardinal Wolsey

Casualties and losses
Unknown	Unknown
- About 4,000 rebels gathered at Lavenham before dispersing.

The Lavenham Revolt was an attempted revolt in 1525 centered on Lavenham in Suffolk as a result of a forced loan to the government in order to fund a planned invasion of France to take advantage of the capture of the French King.

Styled as a "benevolence," the Amicable Grant required subjects to pay a proportion of their movable goods. It was imposed in 1525 by Henry VIII's Lord Chancellor Thomas Wolsey without parliamentary approval and was widely unpopular with subjects already burdened by previous taxes and loans. Charles Brandon, the Duke of Suffolk, was able to collect the payments of the grant from the wealthy clothiers of Suffolk although this led to the clothiers informing their workers that they could no longer afford to keep paying them for their labour.

In the most serious rebellion in England since the Cornish rebellion of 1497, 4,000 men converged on the major trading town of Lavenham. An eyewitness reported that the militants failed to muster effectively because loyal townsmen led by Sir John Spring removed the clappers from the bells of Lavenham church, the ringing of which was to signal the start of the uprising.

The rebellion was eventually crushed by Brandon and Thomas Howard the Duke of Norfolk together with local gentry families such as the Springs, but the rebels had made their point. As well as the discontent in Lavenham there was a taxpayer strike which had spread to the borders of Essex and Cambridgeshire and discontent in London which prompted Henry VIII, who now claimed to have no knowledge of the loan, to halve the tax and the abandon it altogether. The government was also forced to reduce the payments for a previous subsidy. Plans for an invasion of France were dropped.

At the end of May, the rising's ringleaders were brought before the Star Chamber and pardoned. Cardinal Wolsey led an ostentatious ceremony of reconciliation, begging the king for pardon for his fellow Suffolk men, even supplying them with more than enough cash to cover their time in gold and a piece of silver. This marked a significant political setback for Wolsey and demonstrated the limits of royal taxation without parliamentary consent.
