= Anna Petre =

British Roman Catholic nobility

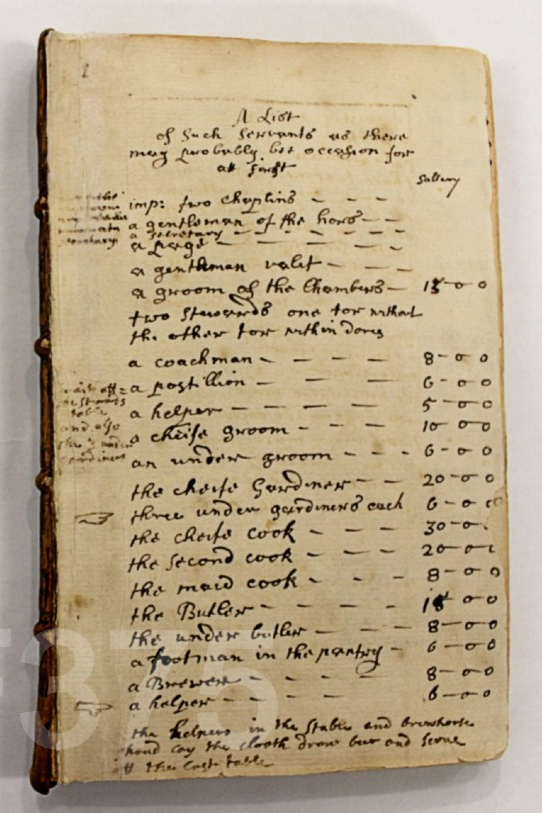
- her record book from 1740
- Born: 1716
- Died: 31 March 1760 (aged 43–44)
- Spouse(s): Robert Petre, 8th Baron Petre
- Parent(s): James Radclyffe, 3rd Earl of Derwentwater; Anna Maria Webb

Anna Maria Barbara Petre, Lady Petre born Anna Maria Barbara Radcliffe (1716–1760) was a Roman Catholic noblewoman. She was of Royal descent and she kept her father's memory alive after he was executed as a Jacobite.

== Life ==
Petre was born in 1716. She was descended from Moll Davis and Charles II via their daughter Lady Mary Tudor. She was the only child of Anna Maria (born Webb) and James Radclyffe, 3rd Earl of Derwentwater to survive her childhood. Her Jacobite father had been implicated in the 1715 rising and he had been beheaded in 1716. Her mother had embroidered a sheet with human hair to commemorate her husband and Anna's father.

On 2 May 1732 she married Robert James Petre, 8th Baron Petre. He was known for his interest in botany. He planted 40,000 American trees at their family seat of Thorndon Hall. Sieur Bourginioni was employed to redesign the garden.

The couple had four children and she ensured that they respected her executed father. She had a chest made from mahogonay to contain his clothing and the four of them were encouraged to venerate this inheritance. Their first child Lady Katherine Anne Petre was born in 1736 and she would marry George Fieschi Heneage. Their next child, Lady Barbara Petre, was born two years later and she would marry Thomas Giffard, 22nd of Chillington. Their youngest daughter was Lady Juliana Petre (1739–1772) who married Edward Weld of Lulworth Castle. Their only son, was their last child, who was born in 1742, Robert Edward Petre, 9th Baron Petre (1742–1801), was her husband's heir within months of his birth.

In 1742, her husband died of smallpox at their home in London. She was a widow with four children, her only son inherited the estate and title and she was his guardian.
