= Stanningfield =

Village in Suffolk, England

Coordinates: 52.175°N 0.754°E

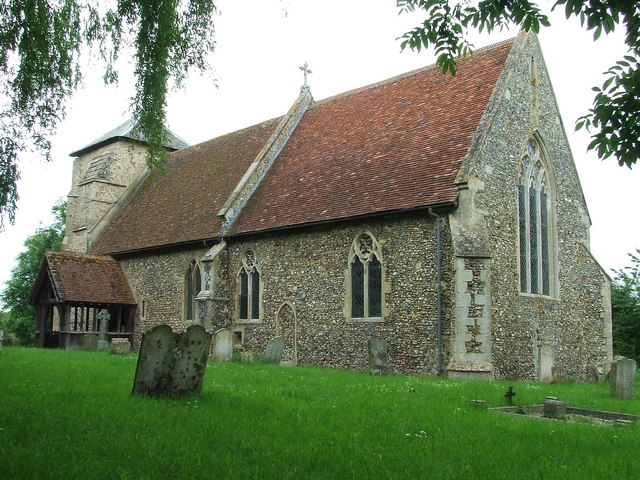
- Church of St Nicholas, Stanningfield

- Location within Suffolk
- Civil parish: Bradfield Combust with Stanningfield
- District: West Suffolk
- Shire county: Suffolk
- Region: East
- Country: England
- Sovereign state: United Kingdom
- Post town: Bury St Edmunds
- Postcode district: IP29

Stanningfield is a village and former civil parish, now in the parish of Bradfield Combust with Stanningfield, in the West Suffolk district of the county of Suffolk, England. The village lies just off the A134 road, about 5 miles (8 km) south-east of Bury St Edmunds, 5 miles/8 km north-west of Lavenham, and 10 miles/16 km north of Sudbury. In 1961 the parish had a population of 211.

== Governance ==
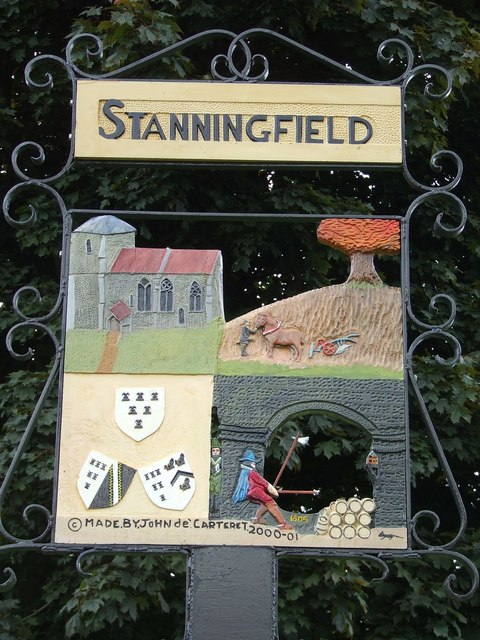
Stanningfield village sign

On 1 April 1988 the parish was merged with Bradfield Combust to form "Bradfield Combust with Stanningfield" Stanningfield belongs to the West Suffolk district of the shire county of Suffolk. The three tiers of local government are Suffolk County Council, West Suffolk Council and Bradfield Combust with Stanningfield Parish Council. The parish currently lacks a parish plan or design statement.

== History ==
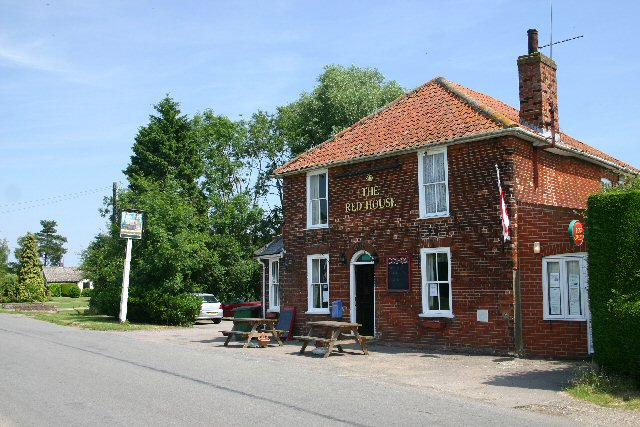
The Red House public house

Stanningfield takes its name from the Early English name "Stanfella" or "Stansfelda" meaning "stony field". It is known that the area was occupied early in recorded British history as traces of Roman occupation has been found on one local farm. Occasional documentary references mention the village in Anglo-Saxon and Norman times, including The Domesday Book. The oldest building, St Nicholas' Church, dates back at least to the Norman period.

The 1838 Tithe Map shows the same internal road patterns as today, with roads leading out to the neighbouring villages of Hawstead, Lawshall, Great Whelnetham, Sicklesmere, Bradfield Combust and Cockfield. The nearest railway station was located in the last until it closed to passengers in 1961. The River Lark is a dominant feature, as are several village greens. Hoggard's Green, the largest, has long played an important part in community life. The pond on that green has long gone, but in 1996 a successful reclamation of an ancient pond at Old Lane was undertaken.

=== Recent years ===
A small scattered village, Stanningfield centres on the green, the Red House inn and the nearby community shop. The inn was built in 1865; Henry Cornish was recorded as landlord in 1871. In 1877, it was bought by the brewers Greene King, along with its outbuildings and adjacent cottages.

There is a picturesque area around St Nicholas's Church, which includes the village hall (formerly the church hall), the old rectory and several old farmhouses. On the Lawshall side of the village stands Coldham Hall, dating from Tudor times. One remarkable feature is the continuity of Roman Catholicism from the Middle Ages to the present day, in a predominantly Protestant area. Ambrose Rookwood of Coldham Hall was executed for his involvement in the Gunpowder Plot. Since 2002, the German supermodel Claudia Schiffer and her husband, the film director and producer Matthew Vaughn, have lived at Coldham Hall.

The novelist, playwright and actress Elizabeth Inchbald (née Simpson) was born into a Catholic farming family in the village on 15 October 1753.

The lead singer and co-founder of the band Talk Talk, Mark Hollis, bought The Old Rectory in the village in late 1986. Much of the band's 1988 album Spirit of Eden was written there; a commercial failure on release, it has since been widely credited as a formative influence on post-rock. The follow-up and Talk Talk's final studio album, Laughing Stock (1991), was also written in Stanningfield, in Hollis's home studio, as was much of his self-titled solo album of 1998, before his move away from the village in the mid-1990s.

=== St Nicholas's Church ===
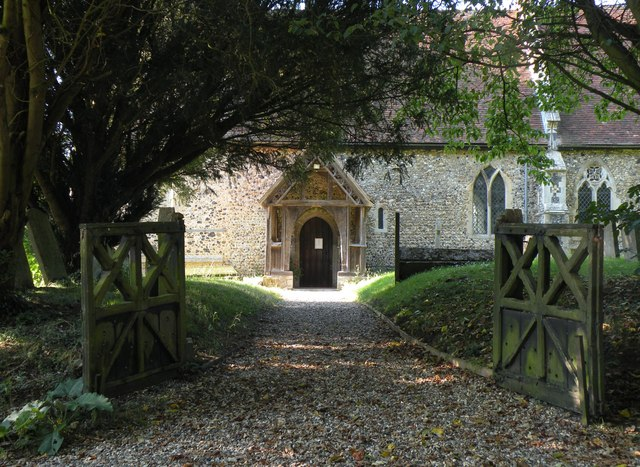
The entrance to St Nicholas's church

There has been a church in Stanningfield since before 1086, when the Domesday Book curtly recorded that Stanfella had a church with 16 acres (6.5 ha) of free land. Situated in a secluded spot about half a mile from the present centre of the village, Stanningfield Church is dedicated to St Nicholas of Myra in Asia Minor, from whom the Santa Claus customs derive.

Each period has added a contribution to the fabric of the church. The most remarkable exterior feature is a Decorated chancel, a bequest from the Rookwood family in the 14th century, noted for the design and craftsmanship of the window tracery. Much restoration was undertaken in the last third of the 19th century and early years of the 20th. Above the chancel arch is a 15th-century "Doom", painted on plaster in black line with some red background. This was expertly restored in 1995.

The bell-chamber stage of the 15th-century tower was reduced in height in the late 19th century and a slated pyramid roof added. Tradition has it that the repair resulted from a Colchester earthquake felt over a 150-mile radius, but subsidence of the medieval foundations is more likely. The tower had three bells, of which one has been hung again to a wooden frame just below the cap. The other two, with inscriptions from the 16th and 17th centuries, stood on the nave floor until as recently as 1967, when they were melted down for scrap.

The church is currently one of seven parishes forming the Benefice of St Edmund Way.

== Listed buildings ==
English Heritage lists the following listed buildings within Stanningfield. The details given represent the names and addresses in use at the time of listing.

Grade I:

- St Nicholas's Church, Church Road
- Coldham Hall, Coldham Hall Lane

Grade II*:

- Former Roman Catholic Chapel, 5 miles/8/km east of Coldham Hall, Coldham Hall Lane

Grade II:

- Fox House, Bury Road – Images of England
- Newhall Cottage, Bury Road – Images of England
- Old Cottage, Chapel Road – Images of England
- Homestead and Sunrise, Chapel Road – Images of England
- Bakers Farmhouse, Church Road – Images of England
- Church Farmhouse, Church Road – Images of England
- Stable And Coach House Block, 80 metres East of Coldham Hall, Coldham Hall Lane – Images of England
- Outbuilding With Bell Turret, 20 metres North East of Coldham Hall, Coldham Hall Lane
- Coldham Hall Cottage, Coldham Hall Lane
- Dovecote 150 Metres South of Coldham Hall, Coldham Hall Lane
- Hall Farmhouse, Donkey Lane
- Makins Farmhouse, Donkey Lane – Images of England
- Barfords, Donkey Lane
- Thatched House, The Green – Images of England
- Orchard Cottage, The Green – Images of England
- Moorside, Old Lane, IP29 4SA – Images of England
- Little Saxes Farmhouse – Images of England
- K6 Telephone Kiosk, Ixer Lane

== Transport ==
The village has an hourly daytime bus service on Monday to Saturday to Bury St Edmunds and Sudbury. Some buses connect with trains to Cambridge and Ipswich (at Bury) or London, Liverpool Street (at Sudbury).

== Demography ==
At the United Kingdom Census 2001, the parish of Bradfield Combust with Stanningfield had a population of 503 in 231 households. This rose to 578 in 253 households at the 2011 Census. The parish population was put at 587 in 2019.

=== Population change ===
Population growth in Stanningfield from 1801 to 1891
Year	1801	1811	1821	1831	1841	1851	1881	1891
Population	248	263	290	306	327	320	268	301
Source: A Vision of Britain Through Time

Population growth in Stanningfield from 1901 to 2011
Year	1901	1911	1921	1931	1951	1961	2001	2011
Population	258	254	211	221	236	211	503	578
Source: A Vision of Britain Through Time

== Notable people ==
- Elizabeth Inchbald (1753–1821) – actress, author, diarist and playwright
- Mark Hollis (1955–2019) – English musician, co-founder and lead singer of Talk Talk
- Residents of Coldham Hall:
  - Ambrose Rookwood (c. 1578–1606) – member of the failed 1605 Gunpowder Plot, a conspiracy to replace the Protestant King James I with a Catholic monarch
  - David Hart (1944–2011) – adviser to Margaret Thatcher, a writer and businessman who lived at Coldham Hall and Chadacre Hall
- Current residents include:
  - Matthew Vaughn (born 1971) – film producer and director
  - Claudia Schiffer (born 1970) – German model and actress
