= Calvin's Case =

1608 English legal decision

- Court: Exchequer Chamber
- Decided: Trinity Term, 1608
- Citations: Calvin's Case (1608), 77 ER 377, (1608) Co Rep 1a, Trin. 6 Jac. 1

Court membership
- Judges sitting: Lord Ellesmere, and 14 judges, including Sir Thomas Fleming, Sir Edward Coke, Sir Lawrence Tanfield, Sir Thomas Foster, Sir Christopher Yelverton, Sir Thomas Walmsley,

Keywords
- Citizenship

Calvin's Case (1608), 77 ER 377, (1608) Co Rep 1a, also known as the Case of the Postnati, was a 1608 English legal decision establishing that a child born in Scotland, after the Union of the Crowns under King James VI and I in 1603, was considered under the common law to be an English subject and entitled to the benefits of English law. Calvin's Case was eventually adopted by courts in the United States, and the case played an important role in shaping the American rule of birthright citizenship via jus soli ("law of the soil", or citizenship by virtue of birth within the territory of a sovereign state).

== Facts ==
Under the feudal system, the allegiance owed to a king by his subjects—connected as it was to the holding of interests in land—ruled out the possibility of any given individual holding land in two different kingdoms. Robert Calvin, born in Scotland in November 1605, was granted estates in England, but his rights to that were challenged on the grounds that, as a Scot, he could not legally own English land.

As it happened, the child "Robert Calvin" was actually named Robert Colville; he was the son of Robert Colville, Master of Culross, and grandson of the courtier James Colville, 1st Lord Colville of Culross.

== Judgment ==
The lord chancellor, Thomas Egerton, 1st Viscount Brackley, alongside 14 judges gathered in the Exchequer Chamber ruled in Calvin's favour, finding that he was not an alien and did have the right to hold land in England. Two of those dissented: Sir Thomas Foster (1548–1612) and Sir Thomas Walmsley.

Although not directly relevant to the case, Edward Coke used the occasion to discuss the position of "perpetual enemies", specifying "All Infidels are in Law perpetui inimici (perpetual enemies)" (166). Having accepted that a king who conquers a Christian kingdom is constrained by the continuance of such laws as exist until new laws are put in place, he continues, however, "if a Christian King should conquer a kingdom of an Infidel, and bring them under his subjection, there ipso facto the Laws of the Infidel are abrogated, for that they be not only against Christianity, but against the Law of God and of Nature." (170). Robert A. Williams Jr. argues that Coke used this occasion to quietly provide a legal sanction for the London Virginia Company to dispense with affording Native Americans any rights as they settled in Virginia.

== Significance ==
=== Postnati and antenati ===
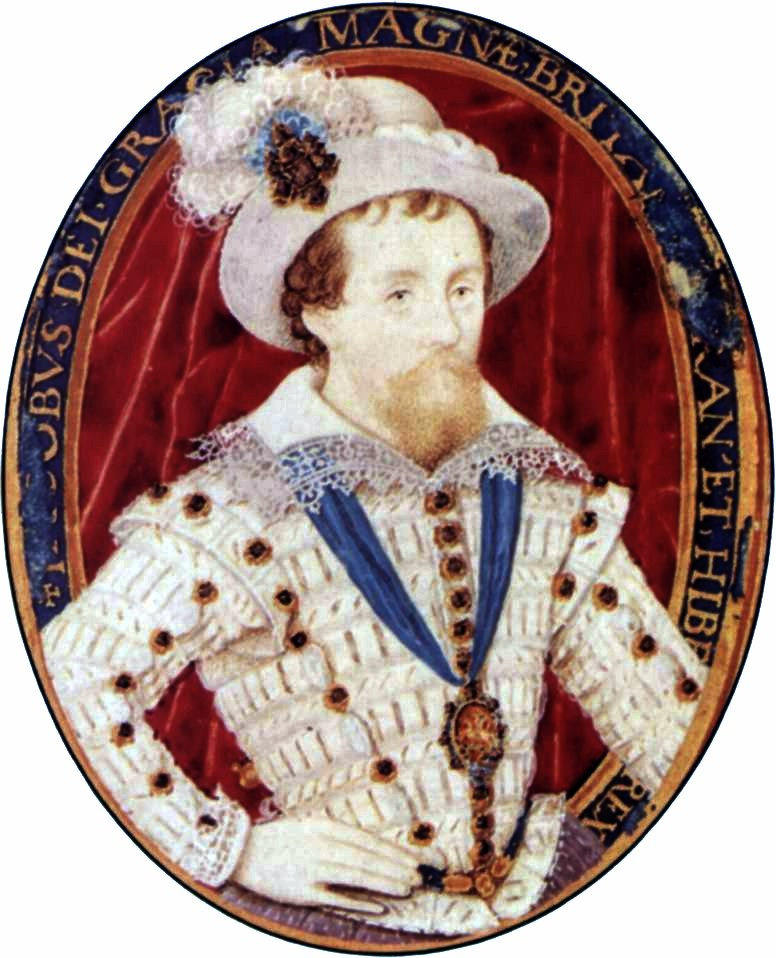
James, King of Scots, inherited the throne of England in 1603, uniting both kingdoms under a single monarch.

The decision in Calvin's Case hinged on Calvin's status as one of the postnati—subjects born into the allegiance of the Scottish king James after he had become the king of England in 1603—and on the fact that the monarch into whose allegiance he was born (the same James, in his capacity as King of Scots) was also the English king at the time of Calvin's birth—meaning that Robert Calvin, in the judgement of the court, was just as much a subject of the king of England as if he had been born in England instead of Scotland. The judges of the court cited existing statutes—including particularly a 1351 statute, De Natis Ultra Mare, which granted the benefits of subject status to foreign-born children of the king's subjects—as supporting the concept that allegiance was tied to the person of the king, rather than to the kingdom itself or its laws.

Calvin's Case did not extend English subject status to the antenati (Scots born prior to 1603). They remained aliens in relation to England, on the theory that King James had not yet become the king of England at the time of their birth. Attempts had been made in the English Parliament, prior to Calvin's Case, to naturalise all of James's Scottish subjects—both those born after his English accession in 1603 (the postnati) and also those born before 1603 (the antenati)—but these legislative efforts had been unsuccessful. Concerns had been expressed that extending the privileges of English subjects to all Scots would cause England to be flooded by "an influx of 'hungry Scots'". Objections were also raised that granting naturalisation to all the Scots would have encouraged the legal philosophy, espoused by James, of absolute monarchy and the divine right of kings. Even after Calvin's Case, the English Parliament could have enacted a naturalisation bill covering the antenati, but it never did so.

=== Later influence ===
Calvin's Case contributed to the concept of the Rights of Englishmen. Some scholars believed that the case did not fit America's situation, and thus reasoned that the 18th century colonists could "claim all the rights and protections of English citizenship". In fact, one scholar asserts that the legal apologists for the American Revolution claimed they had "improved on the rights of Englishmen" by creating additional, purely American rights.

Owing to its inclusion in the standard legal treatises of the nineteenth century (compiled by Edward Coke, William Blackstone, and James Kent), Calvin's Case was well known in the early judicial history of the United States. Consideration of the case by the United States Supreme Court and by state courts solidified the concept of jus soli as the primary determining factor controlling the acquisition of American citizenship by birth, for example in the 1898 case United States v. Wong Kim Ark and the 2026 case Trump v. Barbara.

The case has also been cited as providing legal justification for the restriction of legal rights to Native Americans following their conquest and confinement in reservations by the federal government of the United States.

== See also ==
- United Kingdom immigration law
- Jus sanguinis, an alternative theory of citizenship based on inheriting citizenship from a parent or parents
- Stare decisis, a legal principle whereby new decisions should be consistent with established precedents
