= Amicable Grant =

Tax imposed on England in 1525

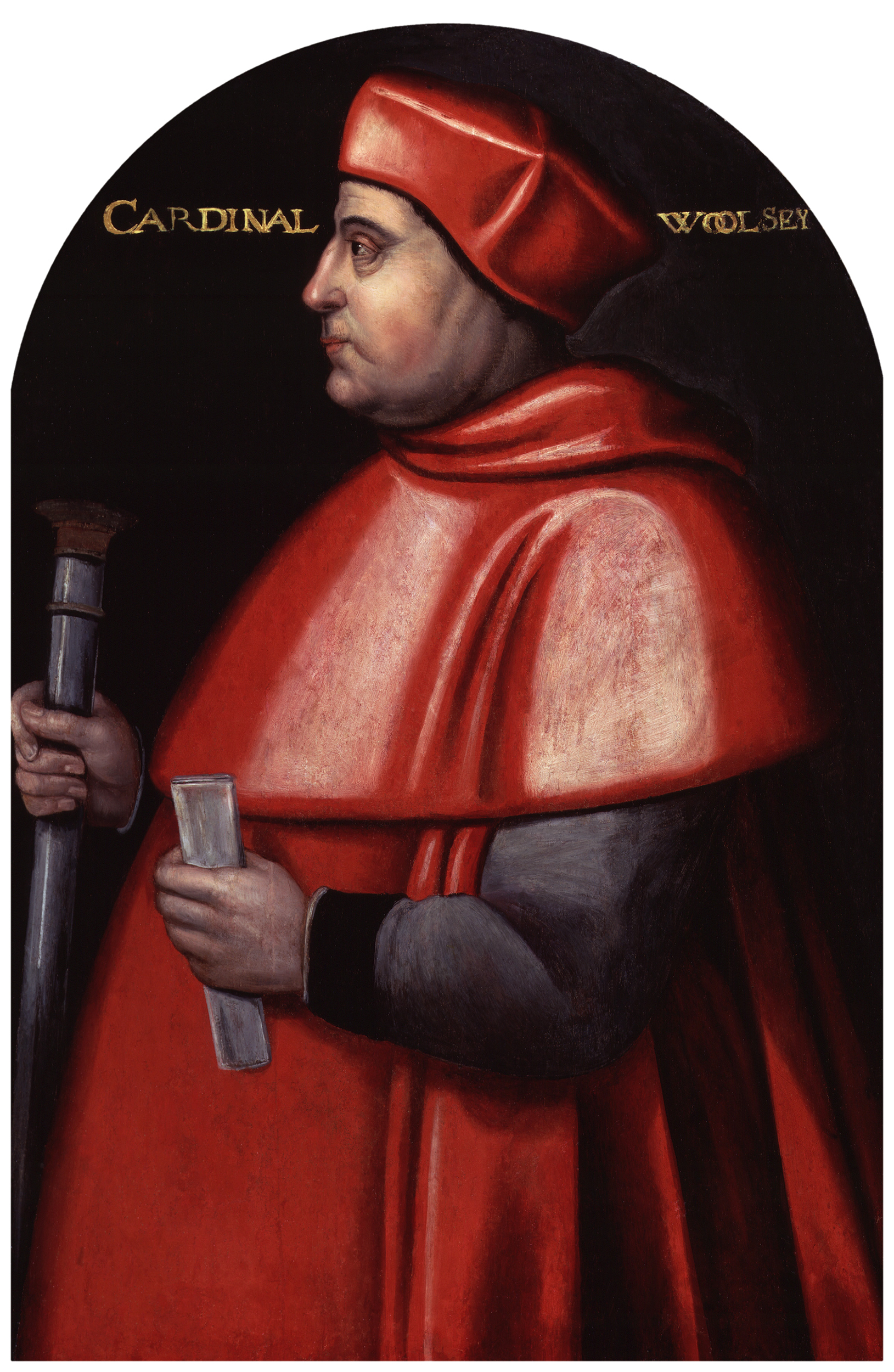
Thomas Wolsey: Lord Chancellor in 1525 and right-hand man to the King.

The Amicable Grant was a tax imposed on England in 1525 by the Lord Chancellor Thomas Wolsey. Called at the time "a benevolence", it was essentially a forced loan, a levy of between one-sixth and one-tenth on the goods of the laity and on one-third of the goods of the clergy. The Amicable Grant should have been levied with Parliamentary authority, but was not, and so the legal framework for its collection was extremely weak. This was partly because it was brought to Parliament by Thomas Wolsey, who was becoming increasingly unpopular. People were mostly opposed to the collection for the simple fact that they were too poor to be paying for the King's foreign military campaigns. Widespread passive resistance, with a growing threat of armed resistance, meant little money was raised and the project was dropped. King Henry VIII now lacked funds for his war in France and, left with no other options, he made peace.

== Causes ==
Henry VIII of England had long wanted to claim territory in France. The King of England had first invaded France in a conquest that lasted from 1511 to 1514. Through this campaign, Henry would spend £650,000. This was obviously a great amount of money and dealt a big blow to his treasury. Despite having lost so much money, in 1525 Henry wanted to mount another invasion of France (the Great Enterprise) since the King of France, Francis I, had been captured by Holy Roman Emperor Charles V at the Battle of Pavia in 1525. Henry believed that this was a great opportunity for him to capture land and perhaps even the crown. However, Henry did not have the capital to fund an occupation of this scale. Henry required additional funds of £800,000 and he needed it fast, so to gain said money Wolsey resorted to the Amicable Grant. The English Parliament was at this time unlikely to support a war, since it was proving to be extremely expensive. Furthermore, Henry's previous French endeavours, which had occurred in 1522 and 1523, had soured many to the idea of another war in France.

== Effects ==
=== Short term ===
Trouble was inevitable and indeed, even anticipated, for the Commons were financially exhausted; the forced 'loans' of 1522–1523 had not been repaid and the subsidy of 1523 was still being collected. Unlike the "loans" of 1522–1523 there were no promises of a return on payment from this new toll. Archbishop William Warham reported on 12 April that he found the Kentish clergy 'not inclined to the grant' and that the heads of the religious houses had answered 'that they cannot contribute as required'. At Ely they said they would gladly sell their cattle and goods 'but no man in the country has money to buy or lend'. Discontent reached dangerous levels across England. In Essex, Kent, Norfolk, Warwickshire, and Huntingdonshire, the grant provoked reactions ranging from reluctance to outright refusal. The Duke of Suffolk was able to collect the payments of the grant from the wealthy clothiers of Suffolk county. Though this led to the clothiers having to return home and inform their workers that they could no longer afford to keep paying them for their labor. This in part helped to provoke an open rebellion in Suffolk and a taxpayer strike, which spread to the borders of Essex and Cambridgeshire. In the most serious rebellion in England since 1497, 10,000 men converged on the major trading town of Lavenham. An eyewitness reported that the militants only failed because loyal townsmen led by Sir John Spring had removed the clappers from the bells of Lavenham church, which were to have been rung to signal the start of the uprising.

The rebellion was eventually crushed by the Dukes of Norfolk and Suffolk, but the rebels had made their point. Discontent in London prompted Henry to halve the demands to save some of the tax, before deciding to abandon it altogether. The Tudor government was also forced to reduce the payments for the 1523 subsidy in order to quell the outrage. At the end of May, the rising's ringleaders were brought before the Star Chamber and pardoned. Wolsey led an ostentatious ceremony of reconciliation, begging the king for pardon for his fellow Suffolk men, even supplying them with more than enough cash to cover their time in gold and a piece of silver.

This "benevolence" perhaps could have been successful if the funds were truly collected from benevolent donors instead of being extorted from an already impoverished people. That said, it would only have been able to be successful in the sense that it might have collected some amount of money and not created revolts but it never would have been able to collect the amount of money needed to sustain a French invasion this way.

=== Long term ===
Wolsey's climbdown was humiliating, and may have contributed to his fall in 1529 since this was the first occasion in which Wolsey had seriously failed to enact Henry's will. Cardinal Wolsey took the brunt of the blame for this blunder with Henry claiming he had never known of the grant much less sanction it. Popular opinion made a significant impact on foreign policy too, reducing considerably the fiscal potential of the Henrician government and forcing Henry to abandon his European schemes; peace with France was the only course, ending significant military endeavours for England until the Scottish campaign of 1542. The aftermath of the Amicable Grant showed that the government had overstepped in its attempts to amass wealth through taxation so quickly. The alterations to the grant and the eventual discontinuation of it speaks to the versatility of the Tudor government. The institution was not so stubborn as to stand behind the grant when it detected unrest among the people. This event (as well as past tax revolts) would likely have played a role in informing King Henry's taxation model in the future. It is also possible these events influenced the taxation model of the Tudor government as a whole moving forward as rebellions related to tax became less common. "While tax revolt was a distinctive feature of the early Tudor period, in the late sixteenth century it was an extremely rare event. Partly responsible were the lessons learned from the tax revolts.".
