= Bradfield Combust with Stanningfield =

Civil parish in Suffolk, England

Coordinates: 52.179°N 0.756°E

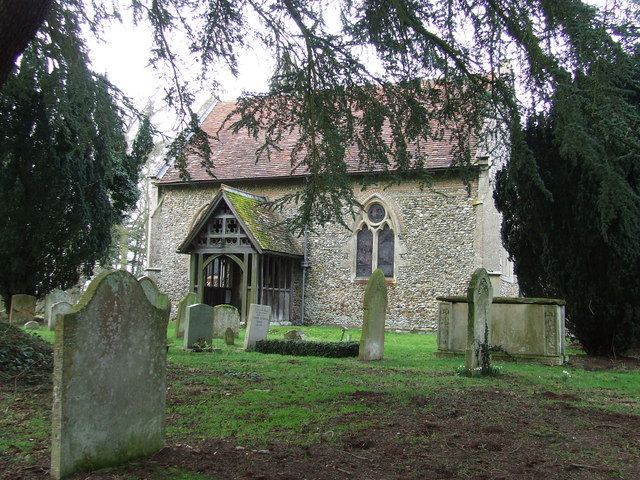
- All Saints’ parish church in Bradfield Combust

- Location within Suffolk
- Population: 578 (2011 census)
- Civil parish: Bradfield Combust with Stanningfield
- District: West Suffolk
- Shire county: Suffolk
- Region: East
- Country: England
- Sovereign state: United Kingdom
- Police: Suffolk
- Fire: Suffolk
- Ambulance: East of England

Bradfield Combust with Stanningfield is a civil parish about 6 miles south of Bury St Edmunds, in the West Suffolk district of Suffolk, England. From 1975 to 2019 it was in St Edmundsbury district.

According to the 2001 census it had a population of 503, increasing to 578 at the Census 2011. The parish was formed in 1998 from Bradfield Combust and Stanningfield.
