= Bradfield Combust =

Village in Suffolk, England

Coordinates: 52.183°N 0.767°E

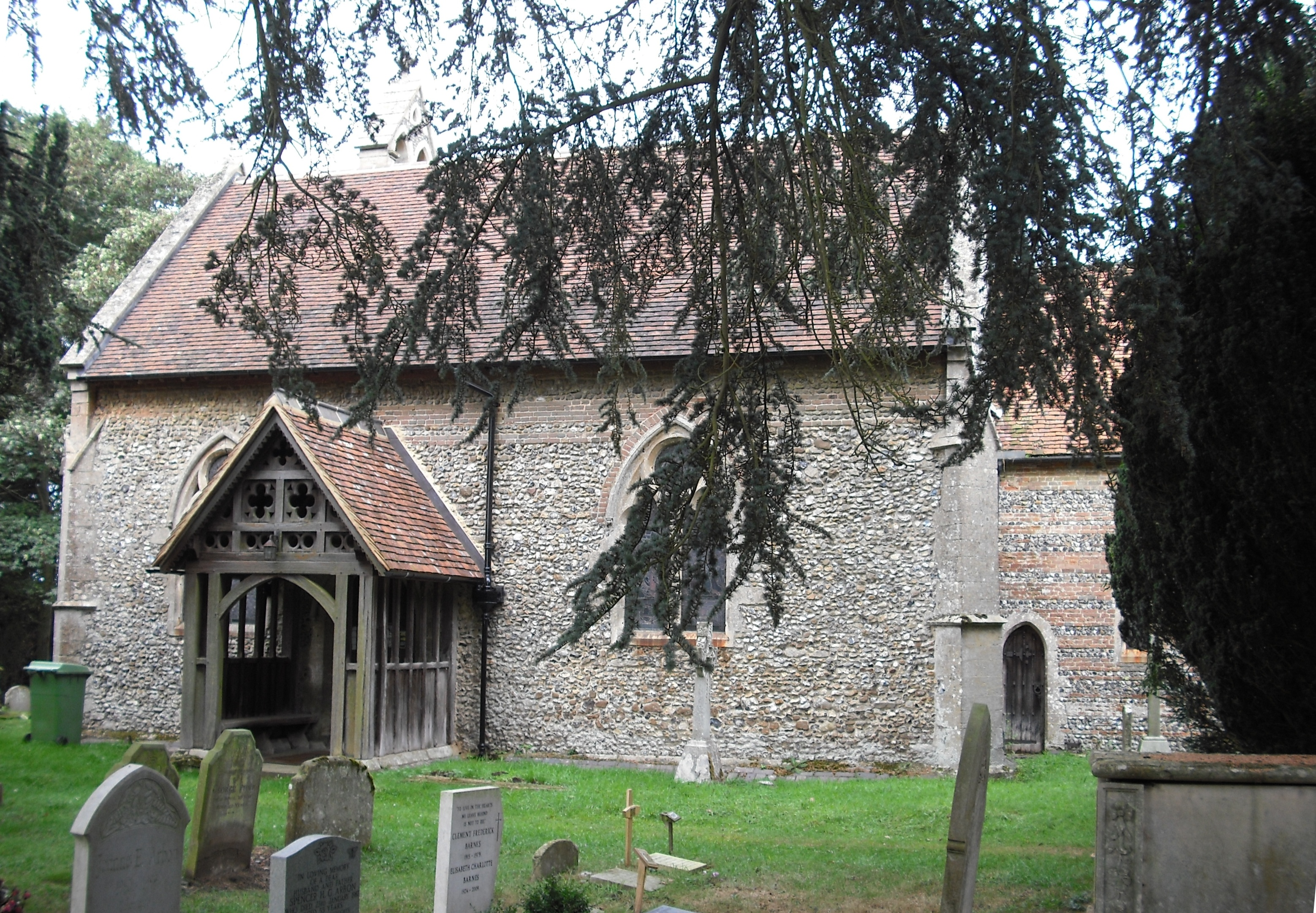
- All Saints Church

- Location within Suffolk
- Interactive map of Bradfield Combust
- Civil parish: Bradfield Combust with Stanningfield
- District: West Suffolk
- Shire county: Suffolk
- Region: East
- Country: England
- Sovereign state: United Kingdom
- Post town: Bury St Edmunds
- Postcode district: IP30

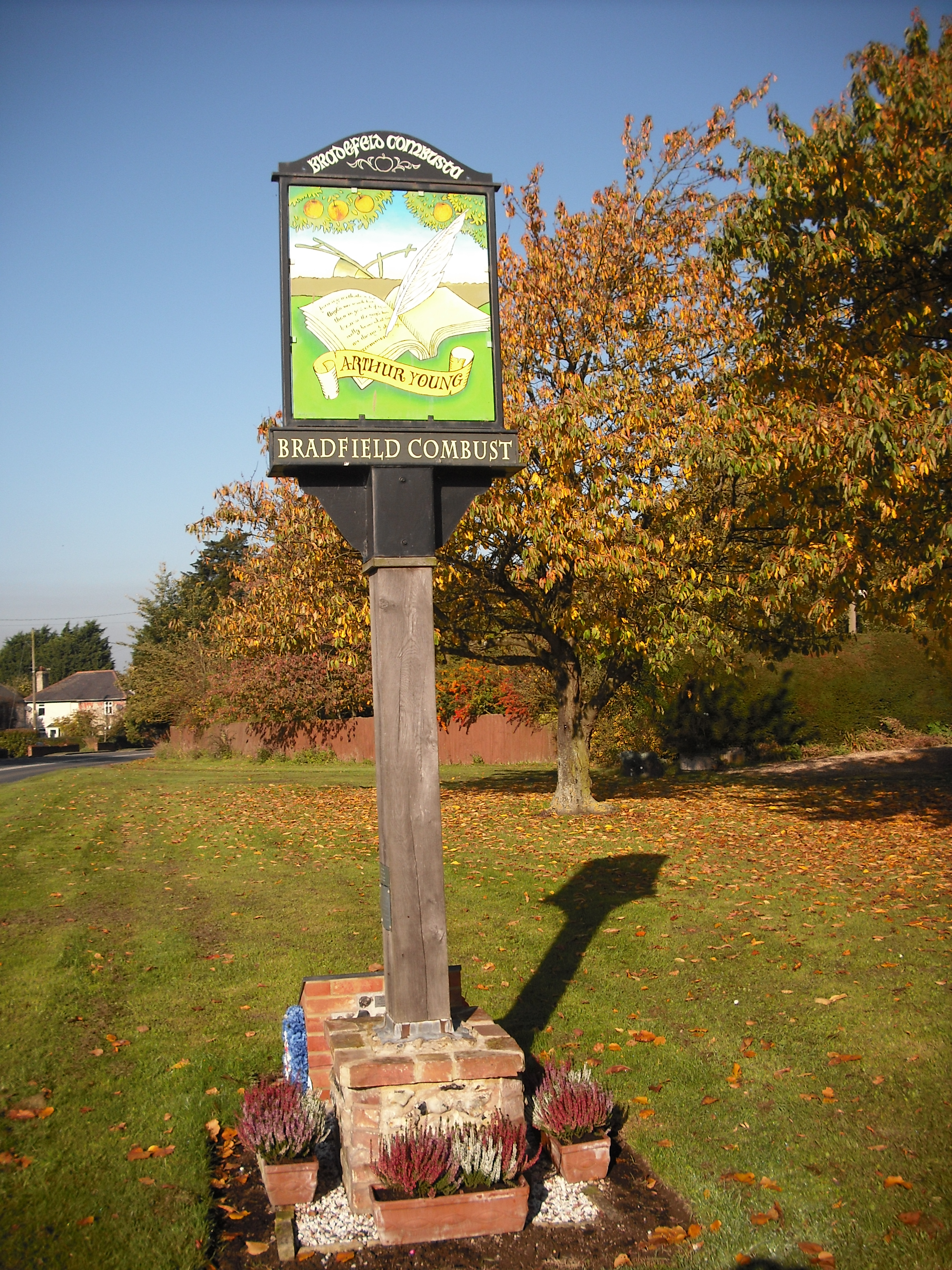
Village sign, bearing the name of Arthur Young (1741–1820)

Bradfield Combust (or Burnt Bradfield) is a village and former manor and civil parish, now in the parish of Bradfield Combust with Stanningfield, in the West Suffolk district of Suffolk, England. It is located on the A134 between Windsor Green and Great Whelnetham. In 1961 the parish had a population of 108. In 1988 the parish was merged with Stanningfield.

== Origin of the name ==
According to Eilert Ekwall, Professor of English at Lund University, the meaning of the village name Bradfield is 'the wide open land (or field)', early spellings being Bradefeld, Bradfelda, and Bradefelda. Combust is derived from combusta, a Latin feminine adjective meaning 'burnt'; or in Middle English brent.

== History ==
Before the Conquest, the manor was probably owned by Ulfketel, ealdorman of East Anglia, who gave this part of his manor to the monks of St. Edmund, while reserving the lordship.

The Domesday Book records the population of Bradefelda manor, including Bradfield St Clare and Bradfield St George. Bradefelda/fella existed before the Conquest. The book states that then (i.e. before the Conquest), as in 1066, there were fifteen villans and eighteen bordars; 'then' one slave, and in 1086 six slaves; and three free men. Over these men St. Edmund (the Abbey of Edmund the Martyr) had sake and soke with regard to every customary due. They were not allowed to sell their lands without the Abbot's permission. In the same place (i.e. Bradfield) other men had more rights: there were in 1086, as before the Conquest, nine free men who could sell their lands but the soke and service belonged to the Abbey or anyone who purchased the land. The Book also records that the church of this 'vill' owned 10.5 acres (4.2 ha) of free land for alms.

The name Bradfield Combust is traditionally said to have derived from an incident in the autumn of 1327, when an angry mob burned down Bradfield Hall at Bradfield, at the time the property of the Crown (a young Edward III) and managed by the Abbot of Bury St Edmunds. However, it is reliably asserted that a Bradfield Hall (the King's own hall) inside the Abbey at Bury St Edmunds was burnt down during that insurrection. Thus there were two Bradfield Halls and there arose a debate as to the naming of the village, and the circumstances surrounding it. The settlement is certainly known to have been called 'Bradefeld Combusta' in 1302/03. Thus the naming of the village cannot originally have been associated with the 1327 insurrection. It is reasonable however, to deduce that the name of Bradfield Combust (appearing certainly in the early 14th century, and in the 15th century synonymous with Brent Bradfield or Burnt Bradfield) does derive from some conflagration – but of what, when prior to 1302, and exactly where, is unknown.

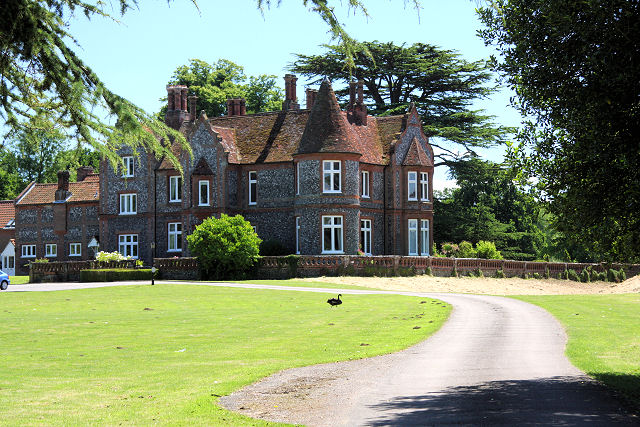
Bradfield Hall

Bradfield Hall at Bradfield Combust is perhaps best known from the 17th century as the seat of the Young family, spanning several generations (from 1620 to the early 20th century) and famous heads of the household. The most eminent member was Arthur Young (1741–1820), an agriculturalist and great socio-political writer and campaigner for the rights of agricultural workers. This Arthur Young entertained or corresponded with such notable people as William Wilberforce, George Washington, Edmund Burke, François Alexandre Frédéric, duc de la Rochefoucauld-Liancourt, and Joseph Priestley. According to Matilda Betham-Edwards, never perhaps had been seen in Suffolk such distinguished international gatherings. The present flint and brick Hall was built in 1857 on the exact site of its predecessor, by his son Arthur John Young. It lies adjacent to a square moated area, possibly modified to make it more impressive when the 1857 Hall was built beside it, but of antiquity.

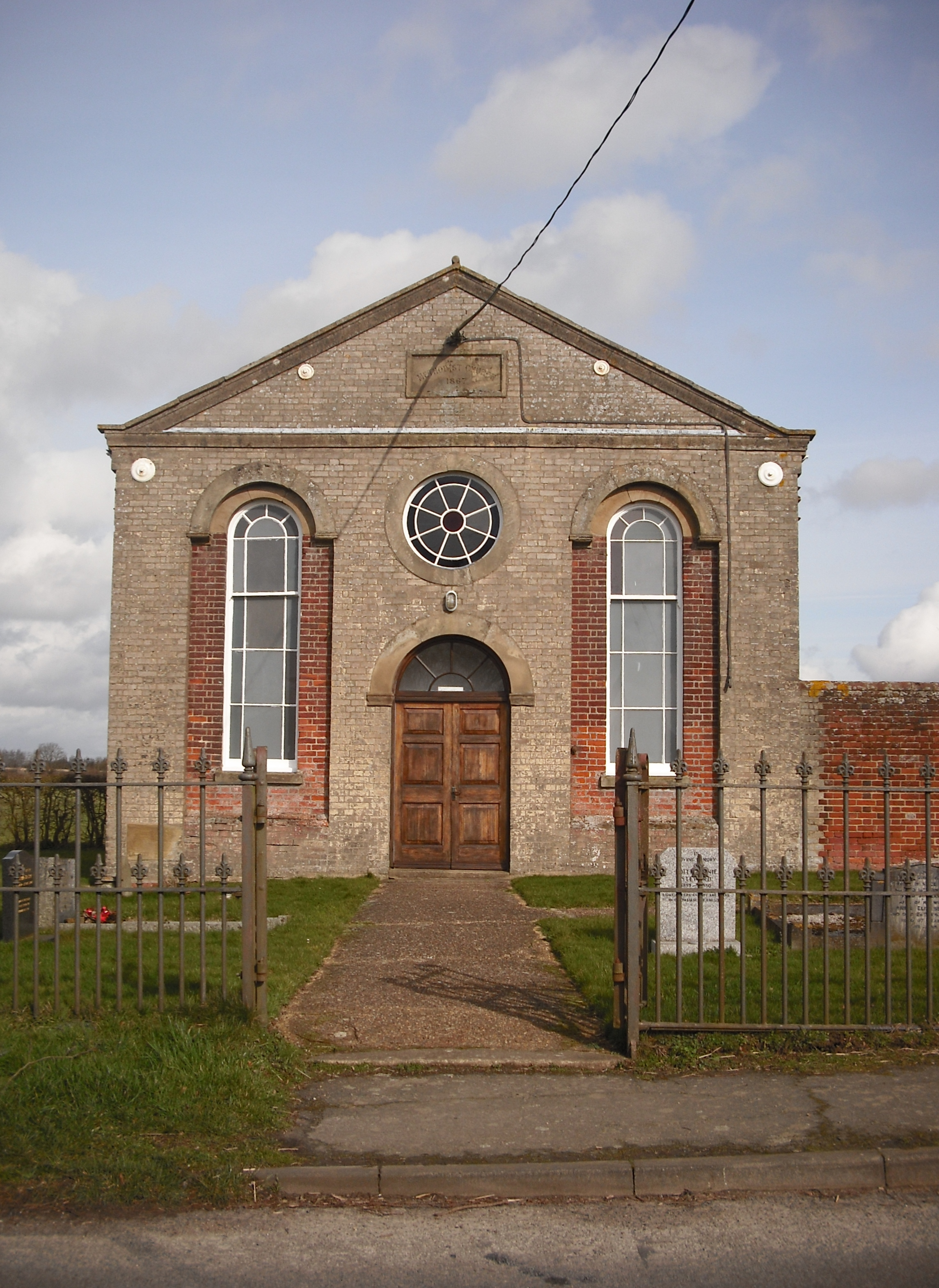
Bradfield Combust Methodist Church

The current village sits astride the A134, originally a Roman Road just here, and the same highway that Will Kempe (one of the co-founders of the Globe Theatre) took in Shakespearian times on his famous dance from London to Norwich.

Bradfield Combust Methodist Church was founded in 1867.

The Manger public house is a 15th-century Grade II listed building with 16th- and 17th-century alterations. It was referred to as "Bradfield Manger" in the will of Thomas Roberson dated 16 July 1660. It is a popular pub and restaurant and a handy meeting place for clubs and special-interest groups.

The village is the site of several commercial fruit orchards and strawberry fields. Suffolk Scouts operate the Bradfield Park Campsite for the benefit of Scouting, Guiding, Educational and Youth Organisations.

== Church of All Saints ==
The church, All Saints, is officially dated 1066–1539, with a late 12th-century Norman font and doorway to the north of the nave. It is a Grade II* listed building. Two wall paintings appear in the nave, one representing St. George and the Dragon (c. 1400), and the other St. Christopher. The tomb of Arthur Young, in the form of a sarcophagus, lies in the churchyard and is designated a National Monument. It is inscribed "Let every real patriot shed a tear, For genius, talent, worth, lie buried here."

== Listed buildings ==
English Heritage lists the following listed buildings within Bradfield Combust.

=== Grade II* ===
- All Saints Church, Sudbury Road – Images of England

=== Grade II ===
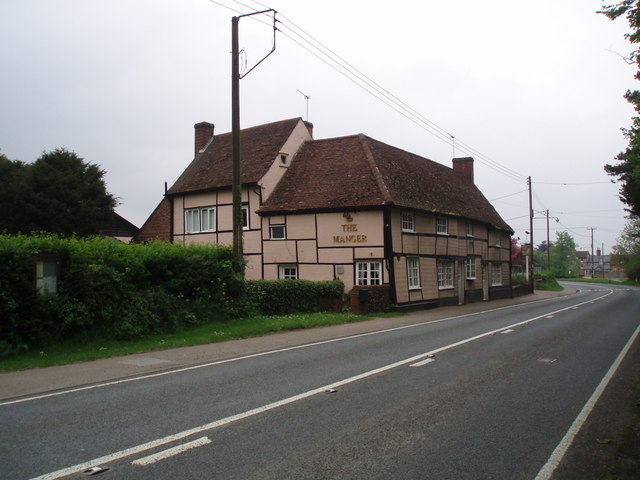
The Manger public house, beside the A134

- Bradfield House, Sudbury Road – Images of England
- Stable And Coach House Immediately East of Bradfield House, Sudbury Road – Images of England
- Bradfield Hall, Sudbury Road – Images of England
- Lodge Cottage, Bradfield Hall, Sudbury Road – Images of England
- The Manger Public House, Sudbury Road – Images of England
- Tomb Chest, 6 Metres South of Chancel of All Saints Church, Sudbury Road – Images of England
- Tomb Chest, 14 Metres South of Chancel of All Saints Church, Sudbury Road – Images of England
- Yew Tree Farmhouse, Sudbury Road – Images of England
- Block Farmhouse, Sudbury Road – Images of England
- Bradfield Loft Farmhouse, Sudbury Road – Images of England

N.B. The above property details represent the names and addresses that were used at the time that the buildings were listed. In some instances the name of the building may have changed over the intervening years.

== Historic estates ==
The parish contained various historic estates including:

- Sutton Hall, seat of the Jervace (or Gervas) family, which passed via the heiress Jane Russell (a niece of John Russell, 1st Earl of Bedford (1485-1555)) to the Wright family. Jane Russell's son was Edmund Wright (d.1583) of Sutton Hall in the parish of Burnt Bradfield a Member of Parliament for Steyning in Sussex in 1559 who became seated at Buckenham Tofts in Norfolk, which belonged to his father-in-law Sir John Spring (d.1547) of Lavenham in Suffolk.
