= Catherine Petre, Baroness Petre =

Catherine Stourton, Baroness Stourton (previously Catherine Petre, Baroness Petre, née Walmesley; 6 January 1697 – 31 January 1785), was a rich Lancastrian heiress.

== Baroness Petre ==
Born into a long-established Lancashire family of Catholic landed gentry, she was the daughter of Bartholomew Walmesley and Dorothy Smith. The last of the Walmesleys, she was 13 when she inherited family wealth on the death of her 15-year-old brother Francis. On 1 March 1712, the much sought after bride married Robert Petre, 7th Baron Petre, bringing him a large dowry of £50,000. Lady Petre was an ardent Jacobite who had been considered as a possible spouse for Bonnie Prince Charlie and even James Stuart “the Old Pretender”. The marriage was cut short by Lord Petre's death from smallpox a year later. Lady Petre was left pregnant and three months later gave birth to a son named Robert, who succeeded as 8th Baron immediately on birth.

== Baroness Stourton ==
Lady Petre turned down a number of suitors during her son's minority. She was a woman of great charity and is said to have caused embarrassment to both families by cutting up her former husband’s parliamentary robes for distribution to the poor. When her son came of age and got married in 1732, Dowager Lady Petre finally accepted the proposal of Charles Stourton, whose first proposal came on the same day as Lord Petre's. She became Baroness Stourton in 1744 when her husband succeeded his uncle as 15th Baron. Her second marriage was childless and she was again widowed in 1753.

Her son having died in 1742, Lady Stourton willed her property to her grandson, Robert Petre, 9th Baron Petre, including her London home in Grosvenor Square.
