= Robert Petre, 9th Baron Petre =

British peer and prominent member (1742–1801)

The Right Honourable The Lord Petre
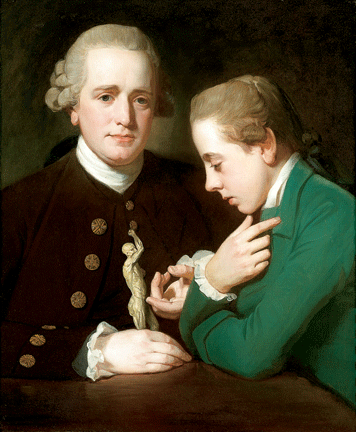
- Lord Petre demonstrating the use of an écorché figure to his son, Robert, by George Romney, c. 1775, Collection of McMaster Museum of Art, McMaster University

Grand Master of the Premier Grand Lodge of England
- In office 1772–1777
- Preceded by: The Duke of Beaufort
- Succeeded by: The Duke of Manchester

Personal details
- Born: Robert Edward Petre; March 1742 Ingatestone Hall
- Died: 2 July 1801 (aged 59)
- Spouses: Anne Howard (m. 1762; died 1787) Juliana Barbara Howard (m. 1788)
- Relations: James Radclyffe, 3rd Earl of Derwentwater (grandfather)
- Children: 7
- Parent(s): Robert Petre, 8th Baron Petre; Lady Henrietta Anna Mary Barbara Radclyffe

Robert Edward Petre, 9th Baron Petre (March 1742 – July 1801) was a British peer and prominent member of the English Roman Catholic nobility. He hailed from an extraordinarily affluent family and devoted himself to philanthropic endeavors. Lord Petre played a crucial role in commissioning James Paine to design a new Thorndon Hall as well as a house in Mayfair.

== Early life ==
Lord Petre was born in Ingatestone Hall, about five months prior to the death of his father, who succumbed to smallpox at the age of 29. He was the son of Robert James Petre, 8th Baron Petre (1713–1742), a renowned horticulturist, and Lady Henrietta Anna Mary Barbara Radclyffe. His mother was his guardian until she died in 1760.

His maternal grandfather was James Radclyffe, 3rd Earl of Derwentwater, who was the grandson of King Charles II through his mistress Moll Davis.

Lord Petre inherited an exceptional amount of wealth and influence. Although claims of being one of the twelve richest men in the Kingdom may be exaggerated, his estates were undeniably extensive. His ancestor, Sir William Petre, had acquired approximately 45,000 acres (180 km^{2}), primarily in Essex and the West Country. This land was further expanded by Sir William's son, John, who added a further 14,500 acres (59 km^{2}). Lord Petre's grandmother, Catherine Walmesley, inherited her family's large estates in Lancashire and Surrey, which were reputed to be worth £7,000 per annum at the time of her marriage.

There is a lack of personal writings and correspondence in the Petre family archive and so it is difficult to form a rounded impression of the man; legend has it that, in later life, he himself destroyed many of his personal papers. They bore witness to the acrimonious disputes which he was to have with the Roman Catholic hierarchy and which, in retrospect, he came to deeply regret. It is clear he was no great intellect; one now anonymous commentator is particularly unkind.

His literary equipment fell short even of the moderate standard then expected of a nobleman and his generous patronage of men of letters and art seems to have been dictated by other considerations than intellectual sympathy.

On the other hand, as Charles Butler, lawyer and Secretary of the Catholic Committee of which Robert was chairman, wrote in his obituary, "All his actions were distinguished by rectitude, openness and dignity". Indeed, from the events of his life emerges a picture of a man of great energy, determination and perseverance with a keen sense of patriotism and duty.

Robert's dogged resolve may well have sprung from a stoicism in face of adversity learnt from those under whose tutelage he was brought up, if it is not too extravagant so to characterize an environment as privileged as his. Not only did his mother lose her husband only months after Robert's birth but both her father and her uncle, executed for their parts in the Jacobite uprisings of 1715 and 1745 respectively, and also her brother, killed in a riding accident, had died prematurely. Robert's grandmother, the redoubtable Catherine Walmsley, was also no stranger to tragedy. Both her parents had died by the time she was four and, during the following nine years, her brother and her two sisters succumbed. She had married the 7th Lord Petre but, a year later, he too died of small-Pox, and she was left, at the age of barely 15, a widow with an infant son. She subsequently married Charles, Lord Storton but, when he died in 1753, she became a widow for the second time.

As mentioned above within a few months of Robert's birth, his father died of smallpox at the age of 29 and so Robert succeeded as the 9th Lord Petre. As a minor, he remained, of course, under the guardianship of his mother and it was only as a result of her death in 1760 that he was permitted to take over his estates at the age of eighteen.

Some additions were made to the original Ginge Petre Charity endowment: for example, a further £48 was settled in 1778 from various properties in the area. Chapman and Andre's Atlas of Essex (1777) shows the almshouses as "the Workhouse", and this seems to have been one of their functions, at least until the 1830s.

Robert also devoted himself to a number of other enterprises. He made annual charitable donations of £500, chiefly to Roman Catholic priests and religious orders both in England and on the Continent. He was the first Chairman of the Chelmer and Blackwater Navigation, which was responsible for building the canal connecting Chelmsford to the sea near Maldon. He was a loyal and patriotic man, for at the end of the century, when Britain was at war with France, he raised a company of volunteers from the districts of Ingatestone, Brentwood, and Billericay; the banners of these volunteers were still hanging in Ingatestone Church in 1848.

== Catholic emancipation ==
Robert was a leading figure in the movement for Catholic emancipation, for example, Dr. Alexander Geddes (1737–1802) protégé of Robert, was a Catholic theologian, writer and scholar who was an honorary graduate of the University of Aberdeen and an early Roman Catholic pioneer of biblical criticism and originator of the "fragment hypothesis" of the composition of the Pentateuch. Between the accession of Elizabeth I and the early years of the reign of George I, thirty separate statutes that either forbade Roman Catholics the practice of their religion or deprived them of their rights and freedoms had been enacted. It is true that, by this time, the emphasis had changed; Roman Catholics could at least adhere to their beliefs and even worship discreetly without undue risk to their life or liberty but the legislation, particularly to exclude them from any public office or profession, was still in place and Roman Catholics remained effectively second-class citizens. How it was that at least some 'treacherous' Roman Catholics were left relatively unmolested by the draconian legislation laid against them cannot be considered in detail here, but the Petre family was not unique in this respect. In fact, Mark Bence-Jones, in his recent book The Catholic Families, even goes so far as to suggest that the effects of the Penal Laws were not entirely disadvantageous to the Roman Catholic gentry. Barred as they were from all public office, they were at least spared the risks associated with such ambitions – the heavy cost of 'electioneering expenses' (or, bluntly, bribes) and the dire consequences of a fall from favour – and could concentrate their energies on the management of their estates, which accordingly prospered.

The principal factor, however, which, over the years, helped to protect some Roman Catholic families from the worst effects of the legislation was the simple matter of the personal loyalty and support extended to them by their local community, even by those who might particularly have been expected to point an accusing finger. Indeed, in some places under the patronage of Roman Catholic gentry, there had been an increase in the number of their co-religionists; in the 27 parishes between Brentwood and Chelmsford that were under the aegis of the Petre and the Roman Catholic Wrights of Kelvedon Hall, the population of Roman Catholics rose from 106 in 1625 to 202 in 1706. Even among the common people, loyalty to Rome was not entirely extinct; a national census of 1767 identifies, out of a total population of seven to eight million, 67,916 Roman Catholics, and there is good reason to suppose that this was a considerable underestimate.

Many did defect, of course, but, at the time of the Catholic Relief Act 1778, there were still eight peers, nineteen baronets and 150 gentlemen of substantial property who remained Roman Catholics. In 1766, Thomas Newman, the Vicar of West Horndon, in whose parish Thorndon Hall lay, was required by the Bishop of London to respond to a questionnaire on the number of Roman Catholics in his parish. He reported:

from the best advice I can collect there are about fifty persons who are reputed to be Papists; Ld. Petre is supposed to be of that persuasion.

The truth of the matter was that Thorndon Hall contained a private chapel consecrated by Robert's cousin, Bishop Benjamin Petre in 1739, and the Visitation of Essex conducted by the Roman Catholic Bishop Richard Challoner in 1754 discovered a congregation of 260 there: indeed, in that year alone, 41 had received the sacrament of Confirmation.

Accordingly, restoring to Roman Catholics their rights and liberties, as citizens became Robert's mission. There were very real obstacles to overcome. The continued existence of the Penal Laws was not just a result of bigotry and intolerance. It was years since any supposed heresy or blasphemy in Roman Catholic dogma or liturgy had been an issue but the question of the nature and extent of the allegiance that Roman Catholics owed to the Pope and his temporal 'power over princes' was another matter. There were a number of venerable constitutional precedents to suggest that the English throne did indeed lie within the gift of the Pope – King John had ‘ransomed’ his crown from the Holy See for one thousand marks – and, even if that were not the case, it was widely perceived that, such was the moral authority of the Pope over his flock, that, if he was to command them to dethrone a heretic ruler, they would be obliged to obey. Moreover, any promise a Roman Catholic might make to the contrary would be null and void since it was no sin to break faith with a heretic. Such a perception was perfectly justified for it was in those very terms that Pius V had issued his Bull of Excommunication against Elizabeth I, declaring that she was.

'to be deprived of her pretended title to the kingdom aforesaid, and of all dominion, dignity and privilege whatsoever; and also the nobility, subjects and people of the said kingdom, and all others which have in any sort sworn unto her to be for ever absolved from any such oath'.

The Vatican had slightly modified but never withdrawn this Bull. The task of Robert and his fellow Roman Catholics was, therefore, to find a way of persuading his sceptical compatriots that they did not recognise the authority of the Pope in temporal matters and that, whatever Rome might say, their allegiance to King George was unequivocal. As late as 1771, Bishop James Talbot appeared in the dock at the Old Bailey charged with "exercising the functions of a Popish bishop", albeit the authorities regarded the trial with some embarrassment. Even if, in practice, the laws were no more than an inconvenience, they were a source of great distress and frustration to one with Robert's sense of patriotic duty. It was for that reason that, in 1771, Robert became a Freemason. Not only did this give him access to many influential figures in the Protestant Establishment but it was, in itself, a snub to the authority of Rome. As recently as 1738, Pope Clement XII had issued a Bull excommunicating Catholics who took part in Freemasonry, a judgment reiterated by his successor, Benedict XIV, in 1751. By a quirk of Canon Law, Robert's apparent defiance of these rulings was only a gesture. Since there was then no official Roman Catholic hierarchy in England, the Bulls could not be formally proclaimed and were not therefore binding. Nevertheless, it was a gesture that was evidently much appreciated; only a year after joining the brotherhood, in 1776, he was elected Grand Master, a position that he held until 1777.

The most practical contribution that Robert made to the cause of Catholic Emancipation was his chairmanship of the two successive committees of Roman Catholic laymen formed to lobby the government and negotiate means by which the disabilities enshrined in the Penal Laws might be swept away. It fell to Robert to take the role as senior Roman Catholic layman in this way since, of the two Roman Catholic noblemen who outranked him, Charles Howard, 10th Duke of Norfolk was a scholarly recluse who rarely left his garden at Greystoke Castle in Cumberland and the 14th Earl of Shrewsbury also had no taste for public life – even though two of the four Apostolic Vicars who administered the Church in England were his brothers.

The committee had also to overcome considerable opposition and obstruction from their own clergy. Some, like the mild and gentle Bishop Charles Walmesley, Vicar Apostolic of the Western District, had been so horrified by the ferocity of the Gordon riots that they wanted their fellow Catholics to give up their demands rather than risk more violent persecution. Many other senior clergy, however, were opposed to the overtures that the committee were making simply because they would brook no compromise as far as the Pope's authority in all matters including affairs of state. No doubt this 'Ultramontane' faction (so-called because they saw authority residing exclusively in Rome, 'beyond the mountains') accounted themselves sincere in this belief but it is hard to avoid the suspicion that it was equally their own authority to govern the lives of their flock which they saw at risk. At any rate, their quarrelsome and often inconsistent opposition came close to sabotaging the progress the committee was making and exchanges between the two factions became increasingly acrimonious. The bishops condemned the committee for their "unwillingness to abandon any one of their own fond deceits"; the committee responded that the bishops' statements were 'impudent, arbitrary & unjust'.

It is not possible here to recount in detail the twists and turns of this debate. The committee never won the argument conclusively – even as recently as 1955, the Roman Catholic historian, David Mathew, condemns the committee as 'a closed corporation of the polite unenthusiastic Catholicism of the Thames Valley' but they were able to reassure Parliament sufficiently to permit the process of dismantling the Penal Laws to get under way.

In promoting the abolition of the Penal Laws, Robert's committee was in large part pushing at an open door as far as Parliament was concerned. The Whig opposition was very much in favour of Catholic Emancipation – Burke vociferously so – but the Tory administrations of Lord North and, later, Pitt were also guardedly sympathetic, albeit for entirely pragmatic reasons; they saw measures favouring the Roman Catholics both as means of stemming massive emigration from Ireland and also as an encouragement to the overwhelmingly Roman Catholic Scottish Highlanders to enlist in the Army. The press also largely supported the committee's objectives and, indeed, when, eventually, legislation came before both Houses of Parliament, it was passed speedily and without opposition.

It is a convincing token of the acceptance that the State was now beginning to extend to Roman Catholics that, in 1778, George III chose to lodge at Thorndon for two days to carry out a review of the troops at Warley Barracks. This was an event of considerable significance since it was the first occasion on which the monarch had visited a Roman Catholic household since the Reformation. Robert had a set of gilt wood Louis XV chairs specially made for this occasion, it is said that his daughters Julia Maria and Anna Catherine embroidered the upholstery. This visit culmination of his work for emancipation.

Robert and his committee may have had little difficulty in enlisting the sympathy and support of the Government in their cause but there were two very real obstacles to overcome. In the first place, mistrust and intolerance of Roman Catholics was still widespread among at least some sections of the populace at large. The Catholic Relief Act 1778 passed through both Houses of Parliament without a division. It was a modest measure that essentially only reversed the Popery Act 1698 (11 Will. 3. c. 4), but it did put an end to the prosecution of Roman Catholic clergy and removed the restrictions on Roman Catholics holding land. Some commentators have claimed that the frenzy of unrest that was fomented by Lord George Gordon in response to this act was the most serious episode of public disorder ever seen in this country. To what extent it was a manifestation of genuine opposition to Roman Catholicism rather than an expression of general dissent is open to question – as Daniel Defoe wrote: ‘There are 40,000 stout fellows ready to fight to the death popery without knowing whether popery is a man or a horse’ – but it was undoubtedly serious. The rioters burnt down Robert's new house in Park Lane and a mob of three thousand marching on Thorndon were only diverted by the military at the last moment. The Government was understandably nervous granting concessions to the Roman Catholics that might further inflame the mob.

The Roman Catholic Relief Act 1791 was more substantial; Roman Catholic chapels (as long as they had neither steeple nor bell) and schools were permitted but Roman Catholics continued to be barred from Parliament, the Bench or a commission in the Army or Navy. In the early 1790s, with the French Wars looming, he raised and equipped the Ingatestone & Brentwood Volunteers, a militia of 250. It was his dearest wish that his son should take command of the company, but the king refused to waive the ban on Roman Catholics receiving commissions and so young Robert was obliged to enlist as a private.

It would nevertheless have been a disappointment to Robert that he did not live to see more far-reaching emancipation for Roman Catholics. The trend towards it had become irreversible but it was still a long time coming. It was over a quarter of a century later that the Roman Catholic Relief Act 1829 removed the bulk of the restrictions that continued to beset Roman Catholics. Even then, some survived. It was only in 1974 that it was formally enacted that a Roman Catholic may hold the office of Lord Chancellor and, to this day, it is only Roman Catholics who are barred, on religious grounds, from ascending the throne.

== Residences and renovations ==
Robert Petre's other great enterprise was the building of the new Thorndon Hall. His father, who was a distinguished plant collector, had embarked on an ambitious scheme to reconstruct the old 15th-century house and its park but his premature death in 1742 brought the unfinished work to a halt. During Robert's long minority, the house and park fell into neglect. In 1757, the house had been badly damaged by fire as a newspaper report of 16 August 1757 bears witness:

"Great Part of Lady Petre's House near Brentwood in Essex was burnt by the Lightning on Monday Night, which did a great deal of other damage in that neighbourhood, and was so violent that it greatly terrified several persons on the road."

The nurseries established by Robert's father contained, at his death, 219,925 plants. When the botanist, Peter Collinson, visited in 1762, he found a scene of desolation: the house was falling down, the nurseries overgrown and the stoves empty, apart from two date palms, a cactus and a few sickly shrubs. Fashion too had moved on apace since the 8th Lord had drawn up his plans; Horace Walpole, on a visit in 1754, found it "The Brobdingnag of bad taste". By the time Robert reached his majority, desperate measures were called for. Nevertheless, it cannot be denied that it was 'folie de grandeur' as much as practical common sense that prompted Robert to commission James Paine, a favourite architect of the Roman Catholic community who had designed Wardour Castle for Lord Arundell and Worksop Manor for the 9th Duke of Norfolk, which, had it been finished, would have been one of the largest private houses in the land, to design a completely new house and Lancelot 'Capability' Brown to re-design the park. He demolished the old Thorndon Hall and built, in its stead, the grandiose Palladian mansion that we see today.

In 1764, with the family temporarily ensconced at their other principal residence, Ingatestone Hall, work began on the vast Palladian mansion, using materials salvaged from the old house. A central block, dominated by a hall, 42 feet (13 m) square and lined by 18 columns, leading, via a grand staircase, to a lofty salon measuring 60 feet (18 m) by 30 feet (9.1 m), contained most of the reception rooms and, bedrooms including the 'State Rooms' and 'Cardinal's Room', His Lordship's study, Her Ladyship's boudoir, two drawing-rooms, the dining-room, the ballroom, the billiard room, the nurseries, the library, the strong room, the armoury and a theatre (a programme for a performance of The Rivals, given in 1792, survives). At each end of this main block stood an outlying wing, connected thereto by a quadrant gallery. The East wing contained the kitchens, laundry, and chapel while the West wing accommodated the extensive coach-houses and stables.

Building continued for six years at a cost that has been estimated at £250,000 (almost £22 million today) but, as the house was nearing completion, Robert further commissioned James Paine to design a house in Park Lane to replace the family's existing London residence in Curzon Street. This house was subsequently burnt down by the Gordon Rioters. Its design is included in James Paine's publication, Plans, Elevations & Sections of Noblemen's & Gentlemen's Houses 1767–1783.

The bare cost of building these houses was, of course, only part of the story. The expense of running such large establishments in a manner appropriate to their opulence was stupendous. Unfortunately, the only detailed household accounts which have survived date from the period just before the new houses were completed but a detailed study of these accounts made by Bishop Brian C. Foley reveals that, in 1760, Robert employed, in the Thorndon Hall household alone, 35 servants. In spite of the modest salaries involved (which ranged from £2 per annum for Elizabeth Summers, the under-nursery maid, to £40 per annum for Mr. Montier, the chef), the wage bill for the year amounted to the tidy sum of £473 18s. Moreover, it is likely that, once the new Thorndon Hall was complete, the roster of household staff would have been significantly increased; there are but three housemaids on the 1760 list, not enough for a house the size of the new Hall.

Although any attempt to translate olden-day sums of money into modern values is always a perilous game, it may be instructive, given the host of figures quoted above, to refer to a study by Robert Twigger of the House of Commons Library which, drawing on a number of sources, constructs an index of the purchasing power of the pound between 1750 and 1993. This suggests that, in 1773, one pound had the purchasing power of something over £72 today.

== Personal life ==
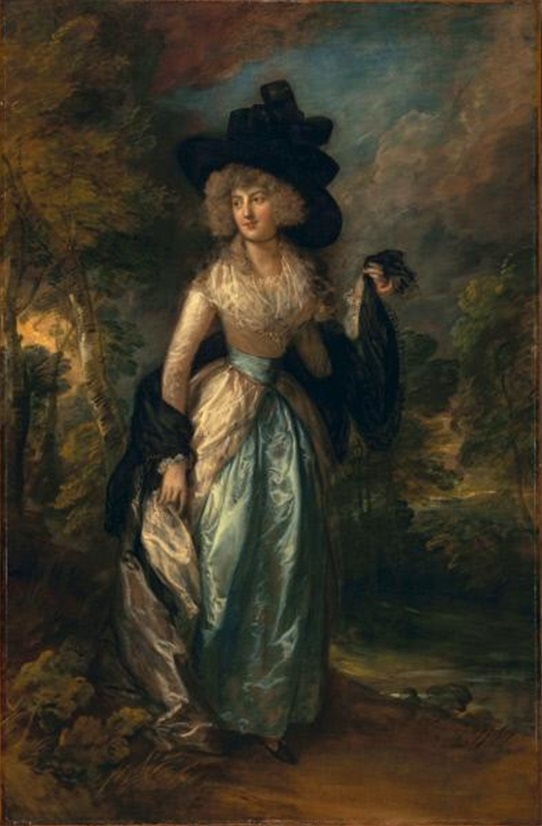
Portrait of Lord Petre's second wife, the former Juliana Barbara Howard, by Thomas Gainsborough (1788)

Robert also brought an energetic enthusiasm to his family life and married well. His first wife, whom he married on 19 April 1762, was Anne Howard (29 August 1742 – 15 January 1787), a daughter and co-heiress of Philip Howard of Buckenham Tofts in Norfolk, younger brother of Edward Howard, 9th Duke of Norfolk (1686–1777). When the 9th Duke died without issue, his niece, Anne Howard, became co-heir with her sister Winifred Howard to various baronies, but not to the dukedom, which went to a distant male cousin.

The couple were both minors when they were married at the house of Hon. Thomas Howard in Golden Square, Soho, by Samuel Nicolls, the then Rector of St James's Church, Westminster. Robert and Anne had four children;

- Robert Edward Petre, 10th Baron Petre (1763–1809), of Buckenham Tofts who married Mary Bridget Howard, sister of her husband's future stepmother and of Bernard Howard, 12th Duke of Norfolk, in 1786.
- George William Petre (1766–1797), who married Maria Howard, third daughter of Philip Howard of Corby Castle, in 1786. After his death in 1797, she married Col. Henry William Espinasse in 1802.
- Anne Catherine Petre (c. 1768–1798), who married General Denzil Onslow of Staughton House, son of Middleton Onslow MP.
- Philip Howard (b. 1773)

Robert and Anne evidently held themselves aloof from politics and the Court, for at the time of the War of American Independence, when France was threatening to aid the Americans by invading Ireland, Horace Walpole noted that the Roman Catholics professed much loyalty, both in Ireland and England, and Lord and Lady Petre went to Court for the first time. Horace Walpole especially remarks on the visit of George III and Queen Charlotte to Lord Petre at Thorndon Hall, after a review of the troops on Warley Common on 19 October 1779.

Anne died in 1787, and Robert married again a year later, on 16 January 1788 in London. His second wife was Juliana Barbara Howard (25 June 1769 – 16 April 1833, London), sister of the future Bernard Howard, 12th Duke of Norfolk. Juliana was 19 years old, 27 years younger than Robert, and, indeed, Robert's son had himself married her older sister two years previously. Juliana and Lord Petre had three children:

- Julia Maria Petre (c. 1790–1844), who married Sir Samuel Brooke-Pechell, 3rd Baronet.
- Catherine Anne Petre (c. 1792–1830), who died unmarried.
- Edward Robert Petre (1794–1848), who served as a Member of Parliament for Ilchester and York and who married the Hon. Laura Maria Stafford-Jerningham (1811–1886), a daughter of George Stafford-Jerningham, 8th Baron Stafford.

There is also a suggestion of an extramarital affair. An American family who go by the name of Rumball-Petre claims to be descendants of an illegitimate liaison between Robert and an unnamed lady of quality. Thomas, the offspring of this union, was fostered, so the story goes, with George Rumball, one of Robert's tenants, and his descendants subsequently emigrated to America. There is some circumstantial evidence to substantiate the tale. A family called Rumball did indeed occupy Begrum's Farm, at Mountnessing, on the Petre estate of Ingatestone Hall in the 18th century and the supposed portrait of Thomas as a boy, which is in the possession of the Rumball-Petres, shows him far too richly costumed to be the son of a humble tenant farmer. Their prize exhibit is, however, a journal allegedly kept by the boy's mother. Unfortunately, this now survives only as a printed and obviously heavily edited version and so it is impossible to determine its authenticity; in particular, for reasons of supposed delicacy, all names referred to in the text have been excised. As a result, although the father of the lady's child is referred to as 'the Baron', there is little to identify him with Robert Petre, apart from the fact that one of the philosophical reflections in the journal is entitled 'Sans Dieu Rien', the Petre family motto. Indeed, it is only too likely that the whole thing is a flight of Victorian fancy; the lady herself is described as lodging in the household of 'the Old Earl' somewhere near Epping. As far as can be ascertained, there were no old Earls anywhere near Epping in the 18th century. Examination of the Land Tax records for Begrum's shows that the Samuel family were in residence from at least 1792 until William Samuel's death in 1818. The MI of his tombstone in St. Giles, Mountnessing reads: Sacred to the memory of Mr William Samuel, late of Begrums Farm in this parish. His Will allowed two of his sons, James Samuel and Charles Samuel jointly to carry on work and manage his said two farms. These records show James in occupation of Charity lands until 1830. This was the description of his father's home from 1813 until he died. The first mention of Rumball living here was not until 1838 Begrum's Lord Petre Thos Rumball 118.3.2 , confirmed by the 1841 census, Thomas was born about 1790, not in Essex, but if it is him still living in Mountnessing in 1851, then he was born in Oxburgh, Norfolk. By 1851 another family were in residence and the Rumballs never worked there again.

=== Death and funeral ===
Robert died on 2 July 1801. He departed this life as he had lived, in grand style. Accompanying the hearse were three divisions of the Ingatestone & Brentwood Volunteers, two companies of Pioneers, two Artillery field pieces and the band of the Royal Buckinghamshire Regiment together with thirty mutes and cloak men, Robert's tenants, two by two, the post-chaise and two carriages from the Thorndon stables, seven mourning coaches, each drawn by six horses, carrying members of the family, clergy and household and a host of outriders, grooms and other mourners. The Chelmsford Chronicle reported the funeral procession on Friday 10 July 1801 thus:

On Thursday Evening the 2d Inst died the Right Honble Lord Petre, Baron of Writtle, in the County of Essex in the 60th year of his age – and yesterday his remains were conveyed to the Family vault, at Ingatestone, for interment attended by his numerous relatives, friends, and tenants, and accompanied by the Corps of Volunteers and Pioneers, which he had raised and patronised in the most zealous and liberal manner for the defence of his Country when threatened by a foreign Invasion. The procession began from Thorndon Hall, between 11 & 12 o'clock in the following order: the two field pieces firing minute guns until the procession was through the park.

Two mutes as Conductors. Four Cloak men. State lid of Black Feathers. Tenants two by two. Two mutes as Conductors to Banner. Four cloak men. Great Banner. Two Cloak men. Two Banner Rolls. Two Cloak men. Two Banner Rolls. Two Cloak men. Two mutes as Conductors to the Military. Four Cloak men. Captain Forbes, on Horseback. First Company of Pioneers in File at double open order. Captain Mason on Horseback. Second Company of Pioneers, in file at double open order. Captain Vassar of the Artillery on Horseback.

Artillerymen in file at double open order with. Field piece. Field piece. Ammunition Wagon. Frugal Man. Major Havers on horseback. Third Division of Volunteers, in file at double open order. Lieutenant Woodgate in the Centre of the Rear file Second Division of Volunteers in file at double open order. Lieutenant Newman in the centre of the rear file. Lieutenant Manby in the centre of the 2nd Division supported by two Sergeants. First Division of Volunteers, in file in double open order. Captain Sidney in the centre of the rear file. Quarter Master Wright, on Horseback. Band of the Royal Bucks, in file, double open order. Two mutes as Conductors to State Horse. Four Horsemen with Cloaks. Mr Stewart, on the State Horse, covered with velvet, with coronet & Cushion. Hearse & Six Horses.

First mourning coach & six Supporter Containing Supporter. B. Havard Esq. LORD PETRE chief mourner G. Petre Esq.

Second mourning coach & six Containing Col. Howard – Col. Onslow and Thos. Heneage Esq.

Third mourning coach & six Containing Sir Francis Molyneux, Sir John Throckmorton, Captain Burch & Mr. Baker

Fourth mourning coach & six Supporter Containing Supporter Revd J Newman Rev. J. Lewis Officiating minister and Rev. Mr. Newman senior. Revd T Newman

Fifth mourning coach & six Containing Revd. Mr. Julian, Revd. Mr. Crosby, Revd. Mr. Cole Revd. Mr. Maton, Revd. Mr. Fleury

Sixth mourning coach & six Containing Mr Tappin, House Steward, Mr. Fletcher Gentleman, Mr. Grey Butler, Mr. Smith Gardener

Late Lord Petre's coach & six horses & three footmen. Four grooms outriders. Lord Petre's post chaise & Four Horses. Two grooms outriders. Two carriages of the family. Mr Haver's carriage. Assistant Chief Steward, to his Lordship. Right Honourable Countess of Waldegrave. Thomas Wright Esq. John Manby Esq.- Gillum Esq. – Selby Esq. Miss Nightingale. Doctor Kirkland. Captain Forbes. John Lodge Esq. – Baker Esq.Brand Hollis Esq.

When within a mile of the place of interment, the field pieces being moved continued firing minute guns till the procession arrived at the church, where the Burial Service was performed in the most impressive and solemn manner, by the Rev. John Lewis, in the midst of the largest concourse of all classes of people, probably ever assembled on a like occasion, vying with each other in paying him the last tribute of respect and veneration. On the signal given that the body was deposited, three volleys were immediately fired by the field pieces of volunteers, over the grave of their much-valued and lamented founder & patron. The whole was conducted with the utmost precision and regularity & without the smallest interruption although the procession considerably exceeded a mile in length.

On 21 July, a solemn requiem high mass was offered in the chapel of the Elector of Bavaria in Warwick Street.

For the Petre family, Robert's death marked the end of an era. His lifetime had been the apogee of the family fortunes and they were never again to aspire to such affluence. In a more general sense, too, his death was a watershed. The gathering pace of the Industrial Revolution and the emergence of an enfranchised middle class signalled the end of the comfortable paternalism of the squirearchy as focus, patron and protector of the community. This was particularly the case for Roman Catholics; it had been a feature of the Penal Times that ordinary Roman Catholics had clustered in communities where they could enjoy the patronage and protection of the Roman Catholic gentry but, now that the process of emancipation had begun, such patronage and protection was of less consequence and the Roman Catholic gentry lost much of their influence.

Masonic offices
Preceded by The Duke of Beaufort	Grand Master of the Premier Grand Lodge of England; 1772–1777	Succeeded by The Duke of Manchester
Peerage of England
Preceded by Robert James Petre	Baron Petre; 1742–1801	Succeeded by Robert Edward Petre
