= John Spring of Lavenham =

English merchant and politician

Sir John Spring
- Died: 12 August 1547
- Burial place: Hitcham, Suffolk
- Spouse: Dorothy Waldegrave
- Children: Sir William Spring; Frances Spring; Bridget Spring
- Parent(s): Thomas Spring, Anne King

Sir John Spring (died 12 August 1547), of Lavenham, Buxhall, Hitcham, and Cockfield, Suffolk, was an English merchant and politician.

== Family and life ==
John Spring was the son of Thomas Spring of Lavenham (d.1523) by his first wife, Anne King, whose family was of Boxford, Suffolk. He had a cousin, also John Spring, whose daughter, Margaret, married Aubrey de Vere, second son of John de Vere, 15th Earl of Oxford; Aubrey de Vere and Margaret Spring were the grandparents of Robert de Vere, 19th Earl of Oxford.

Spring inherited the Spring family cloth trading business, as well as an extensive estate, following his father's death. His lands holdings increased when the Spring family were granted former abbey lands after the dissolution of the monasteries. During the reign of Edward VI he was referred to as lord of the manor of Leffey. He was knighted at the accession of Edward VI. Spring aided the dukes of Norfolk and Suffolk in suppressing the Lavenham revolt of 1525, by removing the bells from the Church of St Peter and St Paul, meaning the rebels could not be called to arms.

Spring made his last will on 8 June 1544 as 'John Spring of Hitcham, esquire', leaving bequests to his wife, Dorothy, his father-in-law, Sir William Waldegrave of Smallbridge in Bures St Mary, and mother-in-law, Margery (née Wentworth) Waldegrave, his son and heir, William, his son-in-law, Edmund Wright, and his unmarried daughter, Bridget, and expressing the wish that Sir William Drury should 'have the marriage of my son [William] before any other'. The will was proved 21 May 1549.

Sir John Spring was buried at Hitcham.

Sir John Spring's great-great-grandson was made a baronet by Charles I.

== Marriage and issue ==
Spring married Dorothy Waldegrave, the daughter of Sir William Waldegrave, by whom he had a son and two daughters:

- Sir William Spring (d. 3 February 1599), who married firstly Anne Kitson, the daughter of Sir Thomas Kitson of Hengrave Hall, Suffolk, and secondly Susan Jermyn, widow of Lionel Talmache, esquire, and daughter of Sir Ambrose Jermyn of Rushbrooke, Suffolk.
- Frances Spring, who married, before 8 June 1544, as his second wife, Edmund Wright (died c.1583), esquire, of Buckenham Tofts in Norfolk, son and heir of Robert Wright of Burnt Bradfield, Suffolk, by Anne Russell, the daughter and co-heiress of Thomas Russell. They had five or six daughters, and in 1551 were granted the wardship of Frances Spring's brother, William.
- Bridget Spring, who married firstly, in June 1563, as his second wife, Thomas Fleetwood, esquire, by whom she had seven sons and seven daughters, and secondly, Sir Robert Wingfield.

Sir John Spring's widow, Dorothy, was buried 10 April 1564. She left a will proved 10 November 1564.
