= Robert Petre, 10th Baron Petre =

British peer

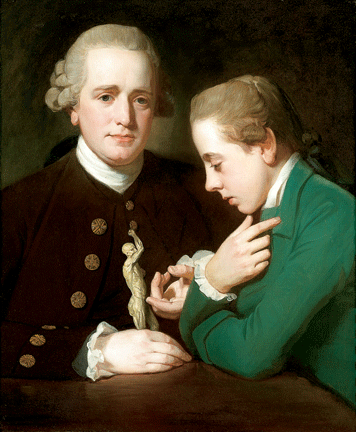
Robert Petre, 9th Baron Petre demonstrating the use of an écorché figure to his son Robert Petre (painting by George Romney, McMaster Museum of Art, Hamilton, Ontario)

Robert Edward Petre, 10th Baron Petre (3 September 1763 – 29 March 1809) was a British peer, the son of Robert Edward Petre, 9th Baron Petre (1742–1801) and his first wife, Anne Howard (1742–1787).

In addition to managing the family estates and businesses, Petre inherited the responsibility for patronage in maintaining certain almshouses in Essex.

== Personal life ==
On 14 February 1786, in London, Lord Petre married Mary Bridget Howard (29 September 1767 – 30 May 1843), sister of the 12th Duke of Norfolk. They were the parents of seven children;

- Maria Juliana Petre (c. 1787-27 January 1824)
- Juliana Anne Petre (c. 1791-5 June 1862)
- William Henry Francis Petre, 11th Baron Petre (22 January 1793 – 3 July 1850)
- Charles Berney Petre (17 December 1794 – 18 June 1854)
- Elizabeth Anne Mary Petre (c. 1797-4 March 1848)
- Anna Maria Petre (c. 1800 - 14 October 1864)
- Arabella Petre (c. 1802-24 June 1886); became a nun.

== See also ==
Peerage of England
Preceded by Robert Petre	Baron Petre; 1801–1809	Succeeded by William Petre
