= William Spring of Lavenham =

16th-century English politician and landowner

Sir William Spring
- Died: 3 February 1599
- Spouses: Anne Kitson; Susan Jermyn
- Children: John Spring; Margaret Spring; Anne Spring; Dorothy Spring
- Parent(s): Sir John Spring, Dorothy Waldegrave

Sir William Spring of Lavenham (died 3 February 1599) was an English politician and landowner.

== Biography ==
Spring was the son of Sir John Spring and Dorothy, the daughter of Sir William Waldegrave. His father died while he was a minor, so he was made a ward of Edmund Wright Esq. of Bradfield.

Spring was MP for Suffolk in 1570. He was High Sheriff of Suffolk in 1578/9 and oversaw Elizabeth I's visit to the county in 1578. He greeted the Queen on the Cambridgeshire/Suffolk county border between the towns of Linton and Haverhill, accompanied by two hundred members of the gentry dressed in white velvet. She proceeded to stay with Spring's relations, Sir William Cordell and Sir William Drury. He was knighted by the Queen upon becoming High Sheriff.

Whilst patron of Cockfield Church, Spring allowed it to be used for Puritan religious meetings, starting the Spring family's association with Puritanism that would last until the Restoration. In 1579, Spring invited John Knewstub to be the priest at Cockfield and the village became a centre of Puritan doctrine. In May 1582, Spring organised an assembly of about 60 clergymen from Norfolk, Suffolk, and Cambridgeshire who met in Cockfield Church, to confer about the Prayer Book, clerical dress and customs.

The Close Rolls contains record of a recognizance in the amount of £2000 acknowledged by Edward de Vere, 17th Earl of Oxford to Sir William Spring on 19 February 1583 in connection with an indenture. A fine was levied regarding the sale of the manor of Earls Hall in Cockfield, Suffolk by Sir William Spring against Oxford in 1583. The Earl later swore before the Queen to pay the money.

Sir William first married Anne, the daughter of Sir Thomas Kitson and Margaret Donnington. Upon her death he married second Susan, the daughter of Sir Ambrose Jermyn. He had one son and four daughters.

He was succeeded by his son John Spring, who died shortly after him. John's grandson was made a baronet by Charles I.

== Notes ==
Political offices
Preceded by unknown	High Sheriff of Suffolk; 1578 and 1579	Succeeded by Sir Nicholas Bacon
