= Robert Petre, 7th Baron Petre =

British peer

Robert Petre, 7th Baron Petre (1689 – 22 March 1713) was a British peer, the son of Thomas Petre, 6th Baron Petre (1633–1706) and his wife Mary Clifton, daughter of Sir Thomas Clifton. He succeeded to his title, at the age of 17, upon the death of his father.

Robert is said to have spurned wearing a wig in the conventional way, spending instead six hours every day dressing his own hair. He caused an uproar of indignation and outrage in the family when, in 1711, out of reckless mischief, the twenty-year-old cut off a lock of hair from the head of a celebrated beauty, his distant cousin, the sixteen-year-old Arabella Fermor, daughter of Henry Fermor of Tusmore, Oxfordshire.

== The Rape of the Lock ==
Alexander Pope, a friend of the family, was prevailed upon to write one of his humorous heroic verses about the incident in the hope that laughter would defuse the situation. The result was The Rape of the Lock (first published in Lintot's Miscellany in May 1712), which was an enormous public success, selling 3,000 copies in four days. The first version of the poem, however, so lampooned all those involved that it upset the Petres even more and Arabella, flattered to be cast as a heroine by the distinguished Mr. Pope, is said to have become "very troublesome and conceited". She became the wife of Francis Perkins of Ufton Court, near Reading, Berkshire in about 1716 and died in 1738.

== Personal life ==
It is known that Petre lived at Ingatestone Hall, but on the strength of his marriage on 1 March 1712, to Catherine Walmesley (1697 – 31 January 1785), an extremely rich Lancastrian heiress. Not long after, they acquired the manor of Dunkenhalgh.

Lord Petre intended to move back to Thorndon Hall, the family seat, but died of smallpox, at the age of 23, before doing so. His 16-year-old bride was 6 months pregnant. His son, Robert James Petre, 8th Baron Petre, was born three months after his death.

== Notes ==
Peerage of England
Preceded by Thomas Petre	Baron Petre; 1706–1713	Succeeded by Robert Petre
