= Robert Petre, 8th Baron Petre =

English Baron

Robert James Petre, 8th Baron Petre (3 June 1713 – 2 July 1742) was a horticulturist and a British peer. Petre was responsible in the late 1730s for the layout of the gardens at Worksop Manor in Nottinghamshire. He was also responsible for the first extensive planting of North American trees in Great Britain. He was elected a fellow of the Royal Society. A Caribbean genus of the verbena family was named for him.

== Life ==
Lord Petre was the son of Robert Petre, 7th Baron Petre (1689–1713) and his wife Catherine Walmesley (1697 – 31 January 1785), heiress of the Walmesley family of Lancashire. Petre was born three months after his father's death so he acceded to the barony at birth. He spent his childhood at Ingatestone Hall, instead of at Thorndon Hall, the family seat, as his grandmother was still in residence there. As a young man Petre went on a continental tour, returning in 1730.

== Botany and horticulture ==
He developed an interest in botany and horticulture as a child, and by his teenage years was friends with some of the most eminent botanists, horticulturists and landscapers of the day, including; Philip Miller, keeper of the Chelsea Physic Garden, Philip Southcote, a leading pioneer of landscape design, and Peter Collinson, the Quaker haberdasher turned horticulturist who was to remain a lifelong friend and colleague. In 1727, when he was 14, he received, as a Christmas gift from Ralph Howard, one of his mother's suitors, a specially made pruning knife and saw, which, it is recorded, was "well taken".

Robert's interest in botany and horticulture was practical as well as academic. By 1729, it seems that, at least in part, he had taken over the management of his grandmother's gardens at Thorndon. The old lady herself evidently had a keen interest in horticulture, growing orange trees, 'jessamines' and myrtles in her greenhouses. In 1732 released from guardianship, his mother handed over to him by special permission the family estates. Now in complete control of Ingatestone and Thorndon halls, Robert was able to give full expression to his enthusiasms and immediately embarked on an ambitious plan to remodel both the house and the park, which had been held in trust for him since his father's death.

John Martin, visiting in 1729, was amazed by what he saw; he confessed he had never witnessed the like of the 'stoves' or hothouses and found in them some species that he, a professional botanist, had never seen before. The raising of exotic species from seed was a particular passion of the time, encouraged by the work of Philip Miller in developing the technique of using beds of tanner's bark to achieve safely and efficiently the high soil temperatures required and Robert had adopted the technique to spectacular effect. Writing to Carl Linnaeus some years later, Peter Collinson exclaims, "Such stoves the world never saw, nor may ever again".

The Great Stove, reputed to be the largest hothouse in the world, was fully 30 feet (9.1 m) high and contained trees and shrubs 10 to 25 feet (7.6 m) tall including specimens of guava, papaw, plantain, hibiscus, Hernandia (jack-in-a-box), ceroid cacti, sago palm, annatto (a red berry used for edible dye) and bamboo cane. The walls were hung with trellises covered with passion flowers, a wide variety of clematis and creeping cereus.

There were also two other stoves maintained at a slightly lower temperature for more temperate plants, a house 60 feet (18 m) long exclusively for the cultivation of bananas and pineapples and another the same size for storing apples. From these stoves came the first camellia to flower in England and, in 1739, a gift of bananas sent to Sir Hans Sloane (along with "2 uncommon fowls of the widgeon kind").

Nonetheless, there were failures too; Robert was particularly fond of the white lilac and, on one occasion, culled sufficient seed to raise in his nursery 5,000 new plants. Unfortunately, the principles of plant genetics and cross-pollination were then little understood; all but twenty of them bore purple blossom.

Between 1740 and 1742, some 60,000 trees of at least 50 species were planted at Thorndon Hall. For the most part, these were arranged in mixed thickets, with dark green foliage contrasting with light green and blue-green with yellow-green, the whole set off by highlights of white bark or leaves with white undersides. This style of planting was not in itself a new idea but was made, in this case, particularly striking by the variety of effects achieved by the wide range of species including: acacias, Acer (Virginia), camphor tree, cedar (Lebanon), red cedar, cherry (Pennsylvanian), oak (Carolina), and tulip trees.

By 1762, however, Collinson, on a visit to Thorndon, found a scene of desolation: the house was falling down, the nurseries overgrown and the stoves empty, apart from two date palms, a cactus and a few sickly shrubs.

The redesign of the estate by his son swept away much of Lord Petre's work, only traces of the plantings, the two mounts adjacent to the present house and the ruins of the ziggurat by the old mill pond can be found today. The menagerie only survives in the name of Menagerie Plantation. Furthermore, Robert's impressive botanic library, including 17 folio volumes of dried specimens, were sold, together with the rest of the family library by the unworldly 13th lord and his mahogany cabinet with 20 drawers stuffed with botanic curiosities was turned into a wardrobe and the contents thrown away.

== Marriage and issue ==
On 2 May 1732 at St Paul's Cathedral, Robert married Lady Henrietta Anna Mary Barbara Radcliffe (1716–1760), only daughter of the James Radclyffe, 3rd Earl of Derwentwater and the former Anna Maria Webb. She was a great-granddaughter of Charles II and, his royal mistress, Moll Davis. The couple had four children;

- Lady Katherine Anne Petre (1736–1783), who married George Fieschi Heneage.
- Lady Barbara Petre (b. 1738), who married Thomas Giffard, 22nd of Chillington
- Lady Juliana Petre (1739–1772), who married Edward Weld of Lulworth Castle
- Robert Edward Petre, 9th Baron Petre (1742–1801), who married Anne Howard and, secondly, to Barbara Howard.

As a young couple, the parents took up residence at Thorndon Hall. Mary had her father's remains put in the mausoleum at Thorndon. There is no entry about the funeral in the register; Rector Ewer was then an old man, and there are only four burials entered for that year. Perhaps the burial was secret.

The sympathies of the Petre family may well have been with the old and young Pretenders, but it does not appear that they took any active part in the risings.

He had the bells of Ingrave Church cast at Ingatestone, and maintain four missions, at Thorndon, Ingatestone Hall, Writtle Park and Crondon Hall.

== Death ==
Like his father, Lord Petre succumbed at an early age to smallpox. He died on 2 July 1742 at Ingatestone Hall, soon after his 29th birthday, and was buried in the family vault at Ingatestone. His son being but an infant, there was no one else to carry forward his plans for the estates, and his widow then resided at Ingatestone Hall, where she died in 1760. She is the last Dowager Lady Petre who has lived in the old family mansion. At his death, Robert's nurseries contained some 219,925 plants and his personal catalogue, now in the Passmore Edwards Museum, lists 696 species.

== Accolades ==
When Robert was 18, he was elected a fellow of the Royal Society – not in itself an exceptional honour since peers of the realm had an automatic right to membership but it is a mark of the esteem in which he was already held that his sponsor was John Martin, future professor of botany at Cambridge. Furthermore, less than two years later, a Caribbean genus of the verbena family, which the plant collector, Dr. William Houston had identified, was named Petrea in Robert's honour.

On his death, the following poem, signed by Janus the Younger (probably a pseudonym for Philip Southcote), appeared in the Daily Advertiser:

Ye lilies rise, your sweets disclose.
Arise both hyacinth and rose.
Vi'lets in fragrant carpet spread,
Ye amaranths lift up your head,
Ye woodbines hung with pearly dew,
Carnations with your richest hue,
Spontaneous rise, rise ev'ry flower.
And form a monumental bower.
With sweets, with bloom, eternal rise.
To mark the ground where Petre lies.

Less sentimentally, his friend, Peter Collinson wrote of Petre in 1744;

The death of the worthiest of men, the Right Hon. Lord Petre, has been the greatest loss that botany or gardening ever felt in this country ... his skill in all liberal arts, particularly architecture, statuary, planning and designing, planting and embellishing his large park and gardens, exceeds my talent to set forth.

And on the fly leaf of his catalogue of the plants in Thorndon Garden is inscribed this tribute;

He was a fine, tall, comely man. Handsome, had the presence of a Prince, but so happily mixt that Love and Au was begat at the same time. The endowments of his mind are not to be described. Few excelled him in the liberal arts and sciences – a great Mechanic as well as a Mathematician, ready at figures and calculations, a fine taste for architecture, and drew and designed well himself – a great Ardour for every Branch of Botanic Science, – whoever sees his vast Plantations and his Catalogue will not doubt it. In his Religious way an Example of great Piety, Charity and Chastity. Strict in his Morals, of great Temperance and Sobriety, no Loose Word, no Double entendre ever dropt from his lips.

Lord Petre was commemorated in a stucco monument by the French sculptor Louis-Francois Roubiliac which was housed in the Temple of Death in the country garden of Jonathan Tyers, the proprietor of Vauxhall Gardens. The garden was at Denbies, near Dorking. The monument represented an angel blowing the last trump causing a stone pyramid to crumble to pieces and the corpse within it to throw aside the grave clothes and prepare to arise "with a mixture of joy and astonishment". The epitaph was written by Mr. Robson, tutor to Petre's children:

To the Memory of my great and much honoured FRIEND ROBERT, Lord PETRE Ob. 2 Jul. 1742. Aet suae 29. This stone, ennobled by a PETRE's name Changes its nature and becomes a gem, Bright with the virtue which appear'd in him: bearing his name, it bears all moral good, And all the ancestry of blood: The saint, the friend, philosopher, and peer In all their lustre to your eyes appear Perusing PETRE only written here

Over the door of the temple, were further verses written by Robson, warning the reader to prepare for death. Robson was Lord Petre's chaplain and tutor to his sons.

== Notable accomplishments ==
- With the help of the American plant collector John Bartram (described by Linnaeus as "The greatest natural botanist in the world"), Lord Petre was responsible for the first extensive planting of North American trees in Great Britain. Robert engaged Bartram to send him regular consignments of seed from the New World at five guineas per box. He also used the Dutch botanist Jan Frederik Gronovius. The sixteen-volume florilegium compiled by Lord Petre – in large measure from the pressed examples sent by John Bartram starting in 1740 – can today be found in the Rare Book Collection at the California State Library/Sutro located on the sixth floor of the newly constructed (2012) San Francisco State University Library, San Francisco, CA (home of Sutro Library). The collection is in a remarkable state of conservation, having been restored (possibly under the direction of Lord Petre), and subsequently by the Sutro staff which has had the collection under its supervision for over 100 years.
- Lord Petre was responsible in the late 1730s for the layout of the gardens at Worksop Manor in Nottinghamshire for his kinsman Edward, 9th Duke of Norfolk (1686–1773). The plans extended over 1,700 acres (6.9 km^{2}) and included some garden buildings, an obelisk, a hemicycle and a Palladian bridge. Robert, who had travelled extensively on the Continent, must have been acutely aware that the appearance of the house was quite out of tune with the classical influence of the day. Although the Renaissance was late coming to England, he must have taken to heart Count Lorenzo Magalotti's remarks about the house's "tendency rather to the gothic and the rustic than to any chaste style of architecture". Accordingly, in 1732, he engaged a Venetian architect, Giacomo Leoni, who worked in the style of Palladio and had done much to establish the classical style, and a French surveyor, Sieur Bourginion, to assist him with the design of the garden. The links between the Petre and Norfolk families endured. In 1763, the Duke of Norfolk stood as sponsor at the baptism of Hon Robert Edward Petre, eldest son of 9th Lord Petre. Joseph Spence wrote Petre "understood the colour of every tree, and always considered how he placed them one by another".

=== Notes ===
Peerage of England
Preceded by Robert Petre	Baron Petre; 1713–1742	Succeeded by Robert Edward Petre
