= William Petre, 2nd Baron Petre =

English peer and Member of Parliament

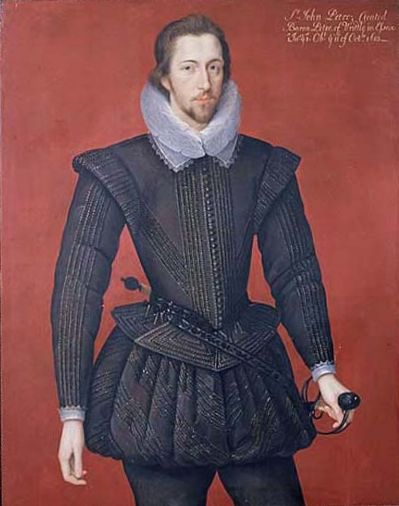
- William Petre by Marcus Gheeraerts the Younger (1599) mislabelled as his father, Sir John Petre
- Born: 24 June 1575
- Died: 5 May 1637 (aged 61)
- Buried: St Edmund and St Mary's Church, Ingatestone
- Noble family: Baron Petre
- Spouse: Katherine Somerset
- Issue: Robert Petre, Elizabeth Petre
- Father: John Petre, 1st Baron Petre
- Mother: Mary Waldegrave

William Petre, 2nd Baron Petre (24 June 1575 – 5 May 1637) was an English peer and Member of Parliament.

He was born the son of Sir John Petre, 1st Baron Petre and was educated at Exeter College, Oxford and the Middle Temple. William and his family were recusants – people who adhered to the Roman Catholic faith after the English Reformation.

He was elected MP for Essex in 1597, knighted in 1603 and inherited the Barony and the Ingatestone estate on his father's death in 1613. In 1623 he was appointed justice of the peace for Essex but, due to his uncompromising recusancy, he was dismissed in 1625 from the Magistracy and deprived of all of his other public offices.

== Ingatestone Hall ==
From its position on the Harwich road, and proximity to London, Ingatestone Hall was a constant meeting place and refuge for those disaffected to the Protestant religion or to the reigning sovereign. For example:

13th July 1627. My Lord Petre’s son going over sea to Flanders with many letters, and two barrels of treasure, gold and silver, in a pink, is brought back and committed, and here it is said, that at his father’s house at Ingatestone in Essex divers great Papists had been in consultation about a fortnight and departed thence but on Saturday last.

Secret guests may often have used the hiding place discovered at the Hall in 1855. It is very probable that some of the inns had similar places of concealment for these visitors, whom it would not always be safe to hide in the Hall, for example, the attic in the White Hart, the huge chimney block of the Eagle, behind the present billiard room, the present great cupboards of the Crown. Many of the houses about Fryerning Hall by the old chimney stacks, and for example, Furze Hall might reveal similar ones if thoroughly explored.

== Private life ==
It does not appear that the 2nd Baron got into any serious trouble about the Papists who frequented Ingatestone, in part due to the support of King Charles I. Possibly, by this time the Hall was used as a dower house, or a residence for the sons, as the 3rd Baron is described in 1638 by William Riley, Blue Mantle, as dying at West Thorndon, and being buried in an old vault appropriated to his family in the chancel of the Parish Church of Ingatestone.

William, 2nd Baron, died in May 1637, and is buried in the same vault. The tomb, which he erected in the north chapel in memory of his parents, bears also, his own effigy and that of his wife and children, but the tablet over his head is still waiting for an inscription.

Petre had married Katherine Somerset (1575–1624), second daughter of Edward Somerset, 4th Earl of Worcester in a double ceremony with her sister Elizabeth who married Sir Henry Guilford. Edmund Spenser celebrated the event in his poem, Prothalamion. They had seven surviving sons and three daughters:

- Hon. Elizabeth Petre (1592-1656), married William Sheldon of Beoley, Worcestershire
- Robert Petre, 3rd Baron Petre (1599-1638)
- Hon. Mary Petre (1600-1640), married John Roper, 3rd Baron Teynham
- Hon. William Petre of Stanford Rivers, Essex (1602-1677), married Lucy Ann, d. of Sir Richard Fermor of Somerton, Oxfordshire
- Hon. Edward Petre (1603-1664), married Elizabeth Griffith
- Hon. John Petre (d. 1670), married Elizabeth, d. of Thomas Pordage
- Hon. Thomas Petre (1606-1656), married Ursula, daughter of Walter Brooke of Lapley, Staffordshire
- Hon. Katherine Petre (1607-1681), danced in the court masque Tethys' Festival on 5 June 1610 in the character of the "Nymph of Olwy", a tributary of the River Usk., married John Carryl
- Hon. Henry Petre (died young)
- Hon. George Petre of Greenfield, Flintshire (1612/3-1647), married Anne, daughter of Henry Fox, widow of John Mostyn

== Portrait ==
A pair of paintings among the Petre Pictures dating from 1590, attributed to Marcus Gheeraerts, were once thought to be the portraits of William's parents, John Petre, 1st Baron Petre and Mary. The paintings were restored after the fire at Thorndon Hall in 1876 and brought to Ingatestone Hall, and bear painted inscriptions naming the subjects. Art historian Roy Strong contends that these are in fact portraits of William and his wife Katherine. The portraits are colourful and relaxed, showing fashionable changes in costume. Lord Petre wears a white ruff over a lace collar, embroidered doublet, full breeches, bobbed hair, moustache and slight beard and, in the fashion of the time, the minute patch of hair below the bottom lip. His wife is equally in fashion; the cartwheel-topped skirt, the full upper sleeves and a variation of ruff open in front to show the neck, a delicate silver tiara and the splendid necklace of pearls, 1466 in all.

Peerage of England
Preceded by John Petre	Baron Petre; 1613–1637	Succeeded by Robert Petre
