= William Petre, 4th Baron Petre =

English peer and victim of the Popish Plot

William Petre, 4th Baron Petre (1626 – 5 January 1684) was an English peer and victim of the Popish Plot.

Petre was the eldest son of Robert Petre, third Baron Petre (1599–1638), and Mary (1603–1685), daughter of Anthony-Maria Browne, second Viscount Montagu, who had been arrested in connection with the Gunpowder Plot in 1605.

Petre was openly a Roman Catholic. A political storm broke in 1678, when Titus Oates alleged, with the support of Lord Shaftesbury, that Petre was involved in the mythical Popish Plot to murder Charles II, was part of a conspiracy to reimpose the Catholic faith on England, and that he had been appointed by the Jesuits as lieutenant-general of a Catholic army of invasion. Petre was arrested and charged with high treason, together with four other Roman Catholic peers, Lord Arundel of Wardour, the Earl of Powis, Lord Stafford, and Lord Bellasyse. He was imprisoned in the Tower of London and entered a plea of not guilty, but no trial was ever held.

In November 1678, Charles II gave royal assent to the second Test Act which removed all Catholic peers, including Petre, from the House of Lords. However, the paucity of evidence to substantiate the charge of high treason, and the weakening of the Whigs in 1681–82, lessened the chances of Petre being convicted, and he continued to be held without trial.

In August 1683, Petre predicted that he would be "cleared by about next spring", but then his health broke down. In December, Lady Petre petitioned Charles II unsuccessfully to release her husband on medical grounds. Expecting death, Petre wrote a final declaration to defend the Roman Catholics against the 'Popish Plot' charges. He died on 5 January 1683/84.

== Biography ==
William was the eldest son of Robert Petre, 3rd Baron Petre (1599–1638) and his wife Mary Browne, and the nephew of William Petre, the translator of Ribadeneira. He was only eleven years old when his father died, and this made him a ward of the King. He spent his childhood in the care of Spencer Compton, 2nd Earl of Northampton. The family's finances were under strain, as the First English Civil War broke out. William, the young Lord Petre, was a royalist fighting for in Warwickshire. His estates were seized by the Commonwealth, and in 1644 Sir Henry Vane the Younger moved in the House of Commons an ordinance for raising £3,000 out of Lord Petre's estate for the recruiting of Colonel Harvey's regiment of horse.

=== Civil War ===
The estates in Essex and London were initially sequestered for delinquency and recusancy; Petre was cleared of the charge of delinquency in February 1647; he received one-third of his estates back, the Commonwealth put different stewards in charge to see that the rents were rightly divided, one third going to Petre and two thirds to the Parliament. The estate was leased at the time to Chaloner Chute for £1,300, and there were many difficulties in apportioning the obligatory payments. Lord Petre, however, managed to get a larger share than his one-third, and in 1647 the local court reported that he holds courts at Ingatestone privately and made many thousands of pounds. As the war progressed, he lost two-thirds of his Devon lands. Petre resorted to many tactics to use, to the full, the lands that he retained, to cover his capital losses, and to postpone or to ease his payments to his dependants. Other members of the family fought for Charles I and met with misfortune as consequence.

Peter Whetcombe does not appear to have given complete satisfaction as steward, for in 1650 Lord Petre had Peter Whetcombe and others summoned for cutting and carrying away timber from his estate. To which they pleaded in defence Parliament's order for raising £3,000 by the sale of his wood (perhaps the ordinance for funding Colonel Harvey's regiment of horse was never fulfilled). Whetcombe further pleaded that he had only cut and sold decayed timber and undergrowth. Arthur Barnardiston was appointed, and shortly after Mr. Richard Greaves, of Lincoln's Inn, held the office, and was directed to keep court on Lord Petre's estate. Nevertheless, by 1651, Petre's liabilities, with sequestration, were twenty times his income, and although the liabilities were not all due immediately, the fourth lord was under pressure that was not manageable.

In 1652, it was necessary for him to sell part of his inheritance. The alternative to the sale of his estates was to renounce his Catholic faith. He chose this alternative, and in May 1652, he took the Oath of Abjuration before the Lord Mayor of London, John Kendrick. By this act of apostasy, Petre recovered his estates, but it is clear from his last letter, written in the Tower to Charles II shortly before his death, that he died a Catholic. No composition fine was imposed, and the sequestration of his estates was lifted on 29 June 1652. This act opened the road to recovery, and Petre, at times with the assistance of trustees, successfully recovered the family's finances. By December 1658, the principal of the debt was down to £12,150, while annual interest on the debt was £2,708.

In 1655, Lord Petre reports himself ill and lame, and begs that he may be examined about his affairs at his own lodgings, which was granted. He was one of the Royalist ‘cavaliers’ imprisoned at Oxford in 1655, but until well advanced in life did nothing to attract public notices. In 1658, he was in custody, and seeking passes for himself and his servant to France, or beyond the seas. In 1659 Bulstrode Whitlock wrote to Colonel Fagge and other militia commissioners of the county of Sussex: "Concerning Lord Petre, Council have received such satisfaction from various well-tried friends that you may liberate him if he will pass his honour to Colonel Fagge to live peaceably, and not abet anything to the prejudice of Parliament."

=== Marriage ===
His first wife, Elizabeth Savage, (d. 1665) was the daughter of John Savage, 2nd Earl Rivers and his first wife Catherine Parker. She was a notorious spendthrift who was less than scrupulous about paying her debts. In his diary, Samuel Pepys, who was acting as agent for his relative William Joyce, a chandler who was attempting to recover a debt he was owed by Lady Petre, makes no secret of his opinion of her "a drunken jade", and a "lewd woman", though he admitted that she was handsome and high-spirited. She could also be notably vindictive, as William Joyce found to his cost when she brought a counterclaim against him and had him imprisoned for default. Pepys tried to mediate but found her implacable, saying that she would have her revenge even if it meant going to Hell. It was said that her husband found her impossible to live with: Pepys himself saw them quarreling in public.

Lady Petre died in July 1665. Although by then she was separated from her husband, she was buried in Lord Petre's family vault. William was living quietly in that retirement forced upon Catholics, ostracized from all influence, but as a devout Roman Catholic he involuntarily drew upon himself the attention of the perjurer Titus Oates and fame was thrust upon him at the time of the imaginary "Popish Plot".

=== Popish Plot ===
In 1678 Oates swore in his deposition before Sir Edmund Berry Godfrey that he had seen ‘Lord Petre receive a commission as lieutenant-general of the Popish Army destined for the invasion of England from the hands of Father d'Oliva (i.e. Giovanni Paolo Oliva), the General of the Jesuits.' The country was in ferment at once, and the wildest excitement prevailed.

To a certain substratum of truth (for example, all the priests he named did exist and he knew some of them personally, and Oliva was the Jesuit Superior General), Titus Oates added many lies, making it exceedingly difficult to separate the guilty from the innocent, and many persons were unjustly condemned and punished. He repeated these statements, before the House of Commons in October 1678, and the House promptly sent for Lord Chief Justice William Scroggs, and instructed him to issue warrants for the apprehension of all the persons mentioned in Oates’s information.

William was arrested with four other Roman Catholic lords – Powis, Belasyse, Arundel and Stafford – who were similarly accused of being destined for high office under the Jesuitical regime, Petre was committed to the Tower on 28 October 1678. Some of those who, it was claimed, had been accessory to the plot, were tried and either executed or acquitted, but some were kept in confinement for years without trial. Lord Petre was one of these. The commons exhibited articles against him in April 1679. For a short time, he had as fellow prisoner Mr. Samuel Pepys, who had been accused of being a Papist, and of selling Navy information to the French. John Evelyn writes in his Diary.

‘4th June 1679. I dined with Mr. Pepys in the Tower, he having been committed by ye House of Commons for misdemeanours in the Admiralty when he was Secretary: I believe he was unjustly charged. Here I saluted my Lords Stafford and Petre, who were committed for the Popish Plot.’

Yet, in spite of repeated demands for a trial by the prisoners’ friends, and of the clamour of the partisans of Oates on the other hand, no further steps were taken until 23 June 1680, when the Earl of Castlemaine, who had subsequently been committed, was tried and acquitted. A few months later Viscount Stafford was tried, condemned and executed; but the patrons of the plot derived no benefit from his death, and nothing was said of the trial of the other ‘popish lords’, though the government took no steps to release them. What saved Petre and the other peers from the scaffold was the death of the informer William Bedloe in August 1680. Under English law, two eyewitnesses were required to prove an act of treason, and unfair though the Plot trials generally were, the judges were scrupulous in observing this rule. Other than Titus Oates there was no remaining witness against Petre and no strong witness against the other three.

Their confinement does not appear to have been very rigorous. Nevertheless, Petre, who was already an old man, suffered greatly in health, and when, in the autumn of 1683, he felt that he had not long to live, he drew up a pathetic letter to the king. In this he says:

‘I have been five yeares in prison, and, what is more grievous to me, lain so long under a false and injurious calumny of a horrid plot and design against your majestie’s person and government, and am now by the disposition of God’s providence call’d into another world before I could by a public trial make my innocence appear.’

This letter was printed, and provoked some Protestant ‘observations’, which were in turn severely criticised in ‘a pair of spectacles for Mr. Observer; or remarks upon the phanatical observations on my Lord Petre’s letter’ possibly from the prolific pen of Roger L'Estrange. Lord Petre was fortunate in so far that he did not lose his head, but he protested his innocence in vain; it was remembered against him that undoubtedly foreign Papists had frequented Ingatestone Hall. It was useless to expect a Stuart to remember and feel any gratitude for the fact that Lord Petre had suffered and fought on the Royalist side so few years ago. Even the discovery in 1683 of the Rye House Plot (called in the register by Rector Ewer ‘the Phanatic Plot’), to assassinate Charles and James and set the Duke of Monmouth on the throne, failed to create revulsion of feeling in Lord Petre's favour, and he was doomed to remain in confinement.

=== Death ===
Baron Petre died before anything was done. His death occurred on 5 January 1684. He did not die in vain, for at once the English public compassion forced the issue with regard to all the prisoners for the supposed plot. A writ of habeas corpus on 12 February 1684 was issued and the judges of the King's Bench declared that these men should long ago have been admitted to bail. The death of Petre did much to awaken fair-minded men to the iniquitous disabilities under which Catholics were suffering, and no Catholic suffered death for his religion after his death. Baron Petre was buried among his ancestors at Ingatestone on 10 January 1684 and laid in the old family vault, his coffin resting on that of his distinguished ancestor, Sir William Petre. There is no monument or slab placed in the church to his memory, probably because he left no son, and only one daughter, Mary, by his second wife, Bridget (1652–1695), daughter of John Pincheon of Writtle. Mary, who was born in Covent Garden on 25 March 1679, married on 14 April 1696, George Heneage of Hainton in Lincolnshire, and died on 4 June 1704.

From "Catholic Martyrs of Essex" (B. Foley 1950), "This martyr died in prison, a confessor, if not a martyr for the Faith, and his death aroused such an outcry and so much compassion that it was instrumental in virtually putting an end to open persecution."

There are four portraits of William; it is strange that he should have felt able to afford such extravagance. With the fines and estate sequestrations of the Commonwealth, his financial position was precarious and it is said that much of the original furniture of Ingatestone Hall had to be disposed of at that time.

His aged mother survived him just a year, and was buried on 17 January 1685, on the north side of the then-new south chancel, and not in the vault with her husband and son. No pictures of the fourth baron's wife or of his mother are known to exist.

== Sources ==
- Lee, Sidney, ed. (1896). "Petre, William (1622-1684)" . Dictionary of National Biography. Vol. 45. London: Smith, Elder & Co.
- Petre, William, fourth Baron Petre (1625/6–1684), nobleman and victim of the Popish Plot by John Callow in Oxford Dictionary of National Biography
- Kidd, Charles, and Williamson, David (editors): Debrett's Peerage and Baronetage 1990 edition, New York, St Martin's Press, 1990,
- Leigh Rayment's Peerage Pages
- Kenyon, J.P. The Popish Plot Phoenix Press Reissue 2000
- Diary of Samuel Pepys
- Diary of John Evelyn
- Mosley, Charles, editor Burke's Peerage 107th Edition Delaware 2003

Peerage of England
Preceded by Robert Petre	Baron Petre; 1638–1684	Succeeded by John Petre
