= Anne Browne =

16th-century English noblewoman

Anne Browne (c. 1495 – 10 March 1582) [AN BROWN], was a Tudor noblewoman known for her prominence in the English court during the 16th century. Born around 1495, Anne Browne lived through a significant period in English history, witnessing the tumultuous events of the Tudor era. Her life spanned the reigns of several monarchs, including Henry VII, Henry VIII, Edward VI, Mary I, and Elizabeth I, allowing her a unique perspective on the changing political and social landscape of the time. Browne's influence and status within the noble circles of Tudor England afforded her a notable position in historical records. She died on 10 March 1582.

== Life ==
She was the daughter of Sir William Browne, sometime Lord Mayor of the City of London. Her first marriage was to Richard Fermor in 1515. They had one son, Sir John Fermor, (c. 1516 – 12 December 1571).

Her second marriage was to John Tyrrell (died 1540) of Heron Hall, Essex, by whom she had two daughters, Katherine and Anne.

Her third marriage had occurred by March 1542 and was to William Petre of Ingatestone Hall, Essex - it was his second marriage. His first had been to Gertrude Tyrrell, possibly a relation of Anne's first husband. Anne brought Petre a marriage portion of £280 from the lease of an estate at Dunton near East Horndon, and from manors in Cambridgeshire and Hampshire. She and Petre had three sons and two daughters:

- John Petre, 1st Baron Petre (1549–1613), who 1570 married Mary Waldegrave (died 2 August 1604).
- Two sons who died young.
- Katherine Petre, who married John Talbot of Grafton, Worcestershire.
- Thomasine Petre, who married Lodovick Greville, son of Sir Edward Greville (died 1559) of Milcote, and by him had Sir Edward Greville.

Anne survived Petre by many years and (like him in his final years) was a covert Catholic; she lived on at Ingatestone Hall, and there received and sheltered many of the seminary priests, whose presence was strictly forbidden in England by Elizabeth's law at that time. Coming from Douai, they could be missionaries to the persecuted Catholics or mercenaries plotting against Queen Elizabeth I.

One of these missionaries was John Payne, who lived for some time at Ingatestone Hall under her protection. He was arrested there in 1577, thrown into prison for three weeks, and then released. He returned to France by the end of the year, but it was not long before he was back in England and at Ingatestone Hall, where he passed as Lady Petre's steward and acted as her confessor. In 1581, information was laid against him, and he was arrested at Warwick and tried, not only for saying Mass, which was then a punishable offence, but also for plotting against Elizabeth. After long investigation, trial, and torture, he was executed in 1582 at Chelmsford. John Payne was nephew of Rector Woodward, of Ingatestone who had resigned rather than conform.

Anne herself was on the list of recusants whose addresses were to be sent up in 1582. Payne's trial and execution seems to have been a severe blow to Anne, for she died in April of the same year and was buried with her second husband in the vault adjoining the chancel at St Edmund and St Mary's Church, Ingatestone, and her effigy lies by his on the tomb above.

Lady Anne made a final will in February 1582; she died later that year.

Among the bequests in her will, she left to her daughter-in-law, Mary Petre, a billiment of goldsmith work with black enamel, thirteen pieces set with nine pearls, and fourteen pieces without pearls. This piece was intended to adorn a French hood. She owned a tablet or locket with a unicorn bone, reckoned to be a charm against poison.

== Bibliography ==
- Fritze, Ronald H. (2004). "Noel, Sir Andrew (c.1552–1607)". Oxford Dictionary of National Biography (online ed.). Oxford University Press. doi:10.1093/ref:odnb/20229. (Subscription, Wikipedia Library access or UK public library membership required.)
- King, H.W. (1865). "Ancient Wills". Transactions of the Essex Archaeological Society. III, Part IV. Colchester: Essex and West Suffolk Gazette: 167–97.
- Knighton, C.S. (2004). "Petre, Sir William (1505/6–1572)". Oxford Dictionary of National Biography (online ed.). Oxford University Press. doi:10.1093/ref:odnb/22047. (Subscription, Wikipedia Library access or UK public library membership required.)
