= John Petre, 1st Baron Petre =

English politician and baron (1549–1613)

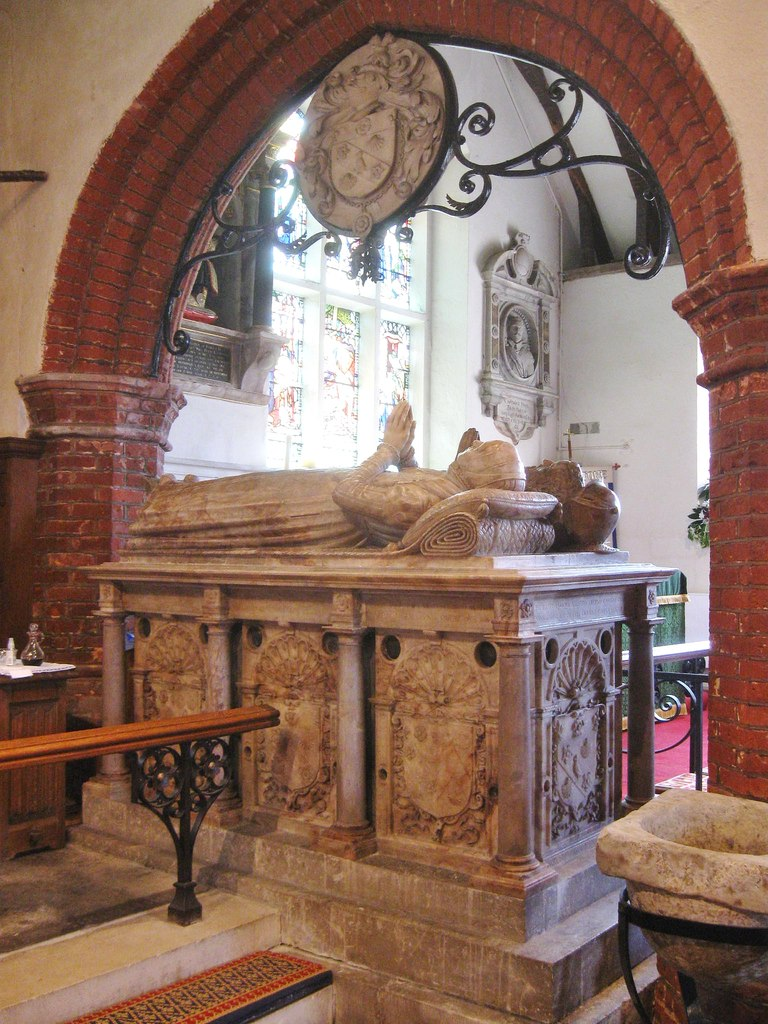
- The tomb of Lord Petre and Mary, Ingatestone Parish Church
- Born: 20 December 1549
- Died: 11 October 1613 (aged 63)
- Buried: St Edmund and St Mary's Church, Ingatestone
- Noble family: Baron Petre
- Spouse: Mary Waldegrave
- Issue: William Petre, 2nd Baron Petre
- Father: William Petre
- Mother: Anne Browne

John Petre, 1st Baron Petre (20 December 1549 – 11 October 1613) was an English peer who lived during the Tudor period and early Stuart period. He and his family were recusants — people who adhered to the Catholic faith after the English Reformation; nevertheless, Lord Petre was appointed to a number of official positions in the county of Essex.

== Biography ==
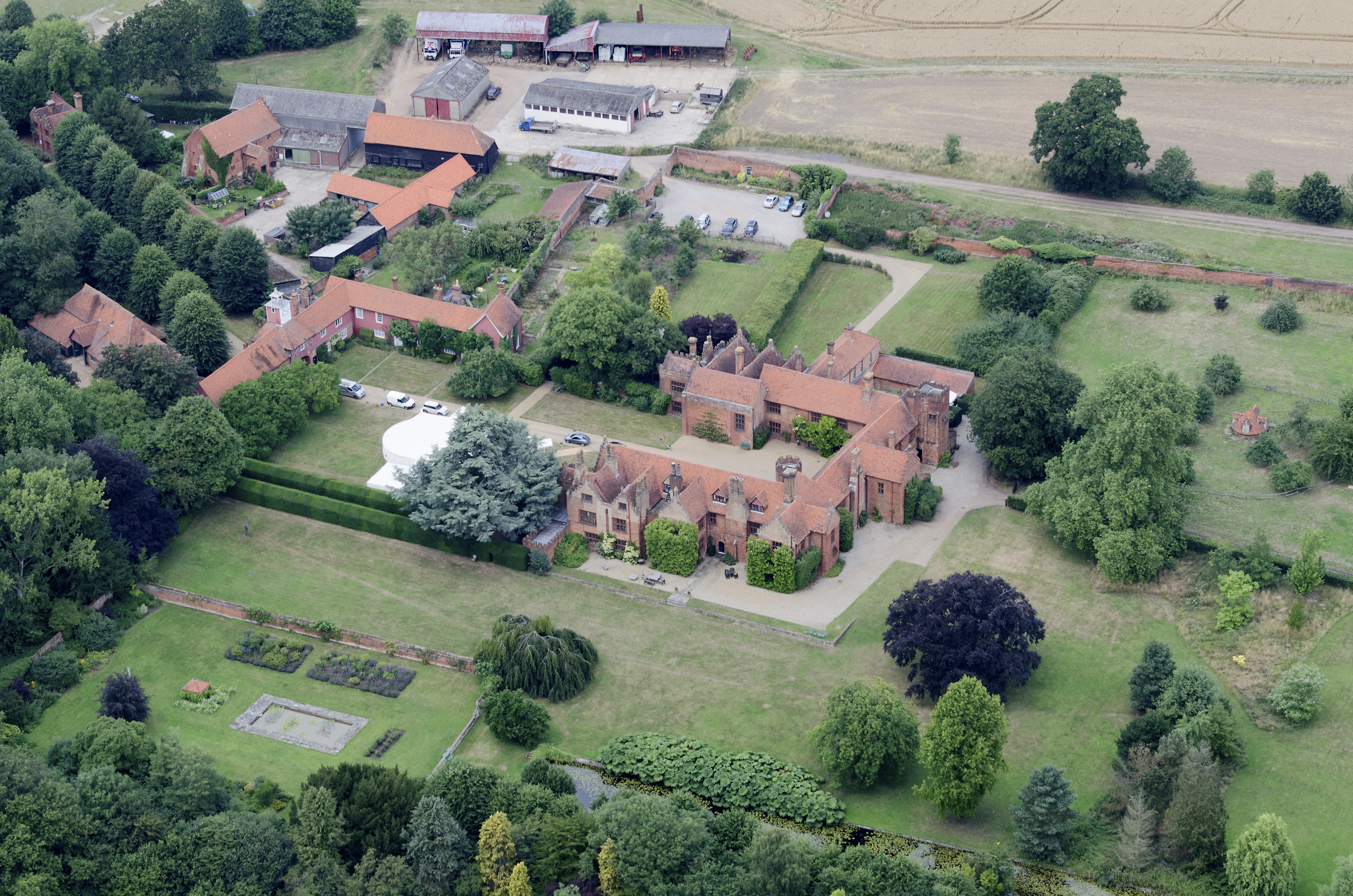
The Petre family seat at Ingatestone Hall, Essex

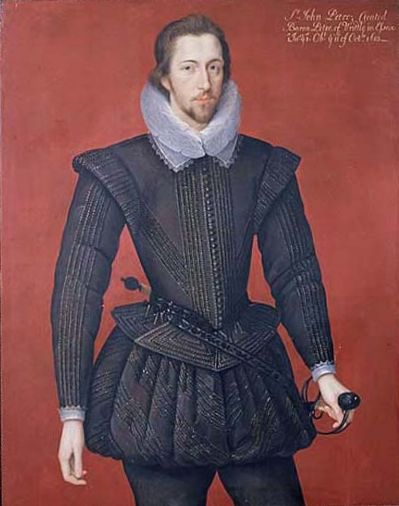
Gheeraerts' portrait of John's son, William Petre, now thought to be mislabelled as John Petre

John Petre was the only surviving son of the statesman Sir William Petre by his second wife Anne Browne, daughter of Sir William Browne, Lord Mayor of London. He lived at Ingatestone Hall in Essex.

A talented amateur musician, Lord Petre kept a full set of musical instruments (lute, five viols, virginals and organ) and was a patron of the composer William Byrd, a fellow Catholic who lived at nearby Stondon Massey. On several occasions, Byrd brought a group of musicians to Ingatestone to entertain at Christmas and dedicated a collection of his Graduale settings to Lord Petre.

In 1570, Lord Petre married Mary (died 2 August 1604), eldest daughter of Sir Edward Walgrave (or Waldegrave) of Borley. By the time of her marriage, Mary was fatherless and poor but gave her parents-in-law 'much joy in his choice'. She left four sons, of whom the eldest, William (1575–1637), 2nd Lord Petre, was the father of William Petre (1602–1677). He probably erected the beautiful recumbent tomb of Sir William, and is himself commemorated by the magnificent one in the north chapel, now the vestry.

In 1574, Lord Petre added West Thorndon Hall and a further 12,000 acres (49 km^{2}) to the family estate, which became the principal seat of the family.

He was knighted, in 1576, by Queen Elizabeth I after his father's death. Despite his Catholic attitudes, he held a number of local offices in Essex, as JP, sheriff (1575–6), and deputy lieutenant (1590–98). He was also MP for Essex in the Parliaments of 1584–85 and 1586–87.

In 1603, he was raised to the peerage as Baron Petre, of Writtle in the County of Essex. He publicly acknowledged that he was a Catholic, and his descendants have remained Catholic since.

In 1590, Lord Petre joined with Sir Thomas Mildmay in investigating the grievance of the mariners, gunners, fishermen, and other seafaring men within the county, who complained they were kept from their ordinary occupation by being constrained to attend at three hours’ warning for Navy service.

In 1600, Lord Petre installed his newly married son in Ingatestone Hall, to gain experience in the ‘government’ of a house, and the in-going inventory gives a vivid picture of it within a generation of the builder's death.

On his accession to the English throne, King James I found himself short of money, and, his predecessors having disposed of all the Abbey and Church lands, he started selling peerages. Eight years later, James created baronetcies and sold them instead of the peerages. By 1615, James was selling peerages at £100,000 each, just over £11 million today as of February 2008.

On 21 July 1603, James I granted him the accession honours, thus creating Baron Petre of Writtle.

He died at West Horndon, Essex on 11 October 1613, and was buried in St Edmund and St Mary's Church, Ingatestone, leaving three sons and one daughter. He augmented his father's benefactions to Exeter College and contributed £951 to the Virginia Company. Exeter College published in his honour a thin quarto entitled 'Threni Exoniensium in obitum ... D. Johannis Petrei, Baronis de Writtle', Oxford, 1613. He was succeeded in the barony by his son William.

== Memorials ==
A pair of paintings among the Petre Pictures dating from 1590, attributed to Marcus Gheeraerts, were once thought to be the portraits of John and Mary. The paintings were restored after the fire at Thorndon Hall in 1876 and brought to Ingatestone Hall, and bear painted inscriptions naming the subjects. Art historian Roy Strong contends that these are in fact portraits of John's son and daughter-in-law, William Petre and Katherine, daughter of the Earl of Worcester. The portraits are colourful and relaxed, showing fashionable changes in costume. Lord Petre wears a white ruff over a lace collar, embroidered doublet, full breeches, bobbed hair, moustache and slight beard and, in the fashion of the time, the minute patch of hair below the bottom lip. His wife is equally in fashion; the cartwheel-topped skirt, the full upper sleeves and a variation of ruff open in front to show the neck, a delicate silver tiara and the splendid necklace of pearls, 1466 in all.

The stone tomb of Lord Petre and Mary is situated in the Ingatestone Church.

Peerage of England
New title	Baron Petre; 1603–1613	Succeeded by William Petre
