= William Browne (died 1514) =

Master of the Worshipful Company of Mercers from 1507 to 1514 (died 1514)

Sir William Browne
- Died: 3 June 1514
- Buried: St Thomas of Acre, London
- Spouses: Katherine Shaa; Alice Keble
- Issue: William Browne; Julian Browne; John Browne; Matthew Browne; Anne Browne; Elizabeth Browne another daughter
- Father: Sir John Browne
- Mother: Anne Belwode

Sir William Browne (died 3 June 1514) served as Master of the Worshipful Company of Mercers from 1507 to 1514, and as alderman, auditor, Sheriff and Lord Mayor of London. He died in office on 3 June 1514 while serving his term as Lord Mayor.

== Family ==
William Browne was the son and heir of Sir John Browne by his second wife, Anne Belwode. His father, Sir John Browne, was Lord Mayor of London in 1480. His cousin, another Sir William Browne, was Lord Mayor of London in 1507. His father's family was from the north of England; in his will William Browne left a bequest 'to my poor kinsfolks on my father's side in Northumberland'.

== Career ==
Browne inherited Flambards in Cold Norton, Essex, as well as other property, from his father in 1498. By 1506 he had augmented his landed inheritance with the purchase of Porters at Southend, Essex, from Jasper Tyrrell.

Browne was a member of the Worshipful Company of Mercers, and Master of the Company from 1507 to 1514. He was Sheriff of the City of London in 1504, alderman of Cordwainer Ward from 1505 to 1514, and auditor from 1510 to 1512. In 1513 he was elected Lord Mayor. On 14 May 1514, as Lord Mayor, he was present during the state ceremonies which took place when Leonardo Spinelli, emissary of Pope Leo X, presented Henry VIII with a 'sword and cap of mystic value'.

Browne resided in the parish of St Dionis Backchurch, where he made his will on 29 May 1514, appointing as executors his father-in-law, Henry Keble, his son-in-law, John Mundy, Robert Blagge, one of the Barons of the Exchequer, and his eldest son, William Browne. He died five days later, on 3 June, during his term of office. Although in his will he had requested burial in the Mercers' Chapel of St Thomas of Acre, according to Stow he was buried in the church of St. Mary Magdalen, Milk Street. According to Strype, there was a monument to him in the Mercers' Chapel.

== Marriage and issue ==
Browne married firstly Katherine Shaa, the daughter of Sir Edmund Shaa (d. 20 April 1488), Lord Mayor of London, and his wife, Julyan, by whom he had a son and daughter:

- William Browne (d.1551), esquire, son and heir, underage at his father's death. He married Thomasine, the daughter of Sir Thomas Baldry, Sheriff of London, by whom he had a son, Thomas Browne, esquire, who married Jane Alington, daughter of Sir Giles Alington of Horseheath, Cambridgeshire.
- Julian Browne, who married Sir John Mundy, Lord Mayor of London.

Browne married secondly, Alice Keble (d. 8 June 1521), the daughter of Henry Keble (1452 – April 1517), Lord Mayor of London, and Joan Bryce, by whom he had two sons and three daughters, whose births during the years 1495–1511 are recorded in Latin in the Keble-Petre Book of Hours.

- John Browne, Warden of the Mint, who married firstly Anne Montgomery, the daughter of Sir John Montgomery of Cubley, Derbyshire, by whom he had no issue. He married secondly, by 1541, Alice Baldry, the daughter of Sir Thomas Baldry, by whom he had two sons and a daughter. He married thirdly, by 1546, Christian Carkeke, the daughter of William Carkeke of London, by whom he had two sons and several daughters.
- Matthew Browne, of whom nothing further is known.
- Anne Browne (1509 – 10 March 1582), who married John Tyrrell (d.1540) of Heron, Essex, by whom she had two daughters, Katherine Tyrrell and Anne Tyrrell. She married, by March 1542, as his second wife, Sir William Petre (1505 – 13 January 1572) of Ingatestone Hall, Essex, by whom she had a son, Sir John Petre (1549 – 11 October 1613), and two daughters, Thomasine Petre (born 7 April 1543) and Katherine Petre (b.1545).
- Elizabeth Browne, of whom nothing further is known.
- Another daughter, of whom nothing further is known.

After the death of Sir William Browne, Alice (née Keble) married, by February 1515, as his third wife, William Blount, 4th Baron Mountjoy, by whom she had a son, Charles Blount, 5th Baron Mountjoy, and a daughter, Katherine Blount (c.1518 – 25 February 1559), who married firstly Sir John Champernowne of Modbury, Devon, and secondly Sir Maurice Berkeley of Bruton, Somerset.
