= Gertrude Tyrrell =

16th-century English noblewoman

Gertrude Tyrrell (died 28 May 1541) was a 16th-century English noblewoman.

== Life ==
Conflicting evidence exists as to her parents. In some sources, she is said to have been the daughter of John Tyrrell (died 28 February 1541) of Little Warley Hall, Essex, the eldest son and heir of Humphrey Tyrrell, by his second wife Elizabeth Walwin, the daughter of John Walwin, of Longford, Herefordshire. However neither a daughter, Gertrude, nor a son-in-law ir William Petre, nor Petre grandchildren are mentioned in his will dated 20 February 1541.

Gertrude's mother is said in some sources to have been Anne Norris, daughter of Edward Norris of Yattendon by his wife Frideswide Lovell, and granddaughter of William Norreys and Joan de Vere, daughter of John de Vere, 12th Earl of Oxford. However, the will of John Tyrrell's widow, Anne, dated 16 July 1552 and proved in 1562, indicates that she was not Anne Norrys, and that John Tyrrell (died 28 February 1541) had two wives, both named Anne; as King points out "it is manifest from his will, that at the time of her marriage with him she was the widow of John Hopton, by whom she had a daughter Elizabeth". In her own will Anne Tyrrell mentions only her son, Maurice Tyrrell, and her daughter Elizabeth (née Hopton), then the wife of John Perient (died 1551), Auditor of the Court of Wards and Liveries.

== Marriage and issue ==
In 1533 Tyrrell became the first wife of William Petre of Ingatestone Hall, Essex, with whom she had two daughters:

- Dorothy Petre (1534–1618). She married Nicholas Wadham (died 1609).
- Elizabeth Petre, god-daughter of Jane Wriothesley, wife of Thomas Wriothesley, 1st Earl of Southampton, who married John Gostwick of Willington, Bedfordshire.

On her death he re-married, to Anne Browne, whose first marriage had been to John Tyrrell (died 1540) of Heron Hall, Essex,

== Bibliography ==
- Fritze, Ronald H. (2004). "Noel, Sir Andrew (c.1552–1607)". Oxford Dictionary of National Biography (online ed.). Oxford University Press. doi:10.1093/ref:odnb/20229. (Subscription or UK public library membership required.)
- King, H.W. (1865). "Ancient Wills". Transactions of the Essex Archaeological Society. III. Colchester: Essex and West Suffolk Gazette: 75–94.
- King, H.W. (1865). "Ancient Wills". Transactions of the Essex Archaeological Society. III, Part IV. Colchester: Essex and West Suffolk Gazette: 167–97.
- Knighton, C.S. (2004). "Petre, Sir William (1505/6–1572)". Oxford Dictionary of National Biography (online ed.). Oxford University Press. doi:10.1093/ref:odnb/22047. (Subscription or UK public library membership required.)
- Metcalfe, Walter C., ed. (1878). The Visitations of Essex. Vol. XIII. London: Harleian Society. p. 115.
- Richardson, Douglas (2011). Everingham, Kimball G. (ed.). Magna Carta Ancestry: A Study in Colonial and Medieval Families. Vol. I (2nd ed.). Salt Lake City. p. 14. ISBN 978-1449966379.
