= Robert Petre, 3rd Baron Petre =

Robert Petre, 3rd Baron Petre (22 January 1599 – 28 October 1638), was educated at Oxford and acceded to the title in 1637 but enjoyed his honours but a short time, and followed his father to the grave in little more than a year. In 1620, he married Mary (1603–1685), daughter of Anthony Maria Browne, 2nd Viscount Montague. She was a charitable and gallant Royalist and Catholic, once defying a troop of over a hundred Cromwellian / Roundhead / parliamentary soldiers alone, who wished to search Ingatestone Hall. She was a woman destined to have a long and troubled widowhood. Many are the notices in the State Papers about the Petre property in her days until she died in 1685, two years after her son.

When Lord Petre died in 1638 an inventory showed that he had no debts, £7,500 cash in hand (approximately £657,000 today) and £4,000 in realizable loans (approximately £350,000 today). The rents for Essex and Devon totalled £13,500 (approximately £1.183 million today); owing to inflation, the increase in rents was over three-fold, so that the main branch of the family had more than held its own since 1540, in spite of expensive marriage settlements.

He left three sons, each of whom succeeded to the title, and two daughters.

- Mary (c. 1624–1672); wife of Edward Stourton and mother of the 12th Baron Stourton
- William Petre, 4th Baron Petre (1626–1683)
- John Petre, 5th Baron Petre (1629–1684)
- Thomas Petre, 6th Baron Petre (1633–1706)
- Dorothy; married John Thimbelby, son of Sir John Thimbelby

Peerage of England
Preceded by William Petre	Baron Petre; 1637–1638	Succeeded by William Petre
