= Dorothy Wadham =

Founder of Wadham College, Oxford (1534–1618)

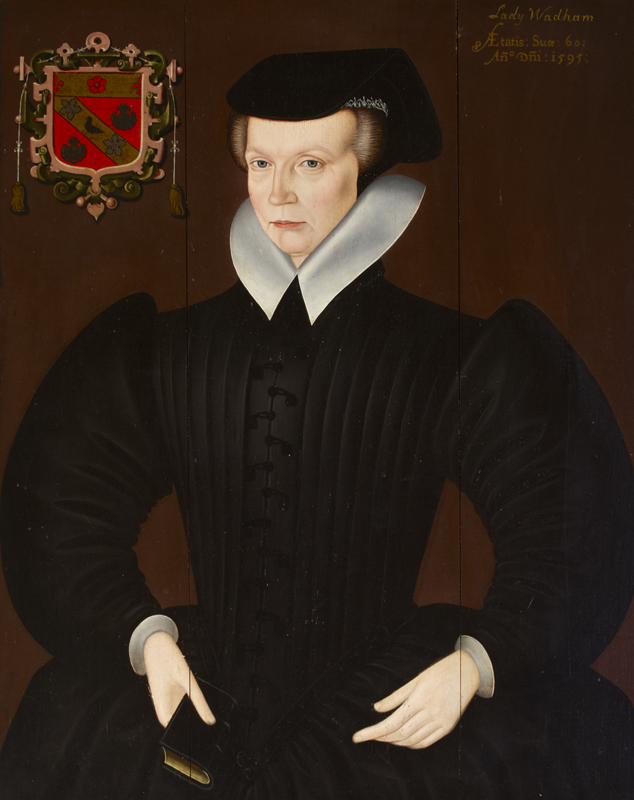
- 1595 portrait of Wadham aged 60
- Born: 1534/1535
- Died: 16 May 1618 (aged 83–84); Edge, Devon, England
- Known for: Founding Wadham College
- Spouse: Nicholas Wadham (m. 1555; died 1609)
- Parent(s): Gertrude Tyrrell (mother); Sir William Petre (father)

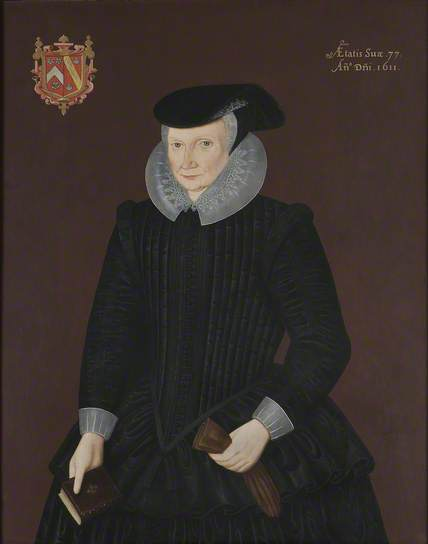
Portrait of Dorothy Wadham, aged 77 in 1611, with arms of Wadham impaling Petre. By an unknown artist, collection of Wadham College, Oxford

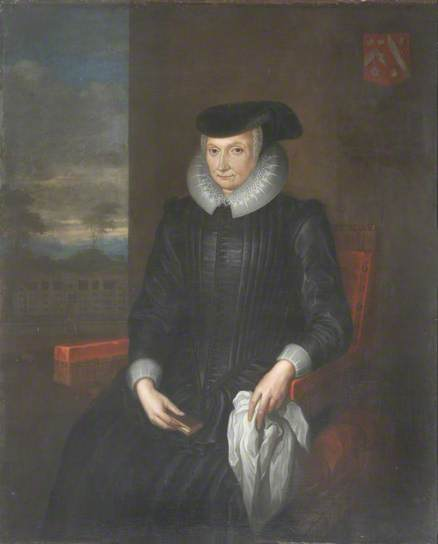
Undated portrait of Dorothy Wadham, with arms of Wadham impaling Petre. By Wilhelm Sonmans (d.1708), painted after her death, apparently a late copy. Collection of Wadham College, Oxford

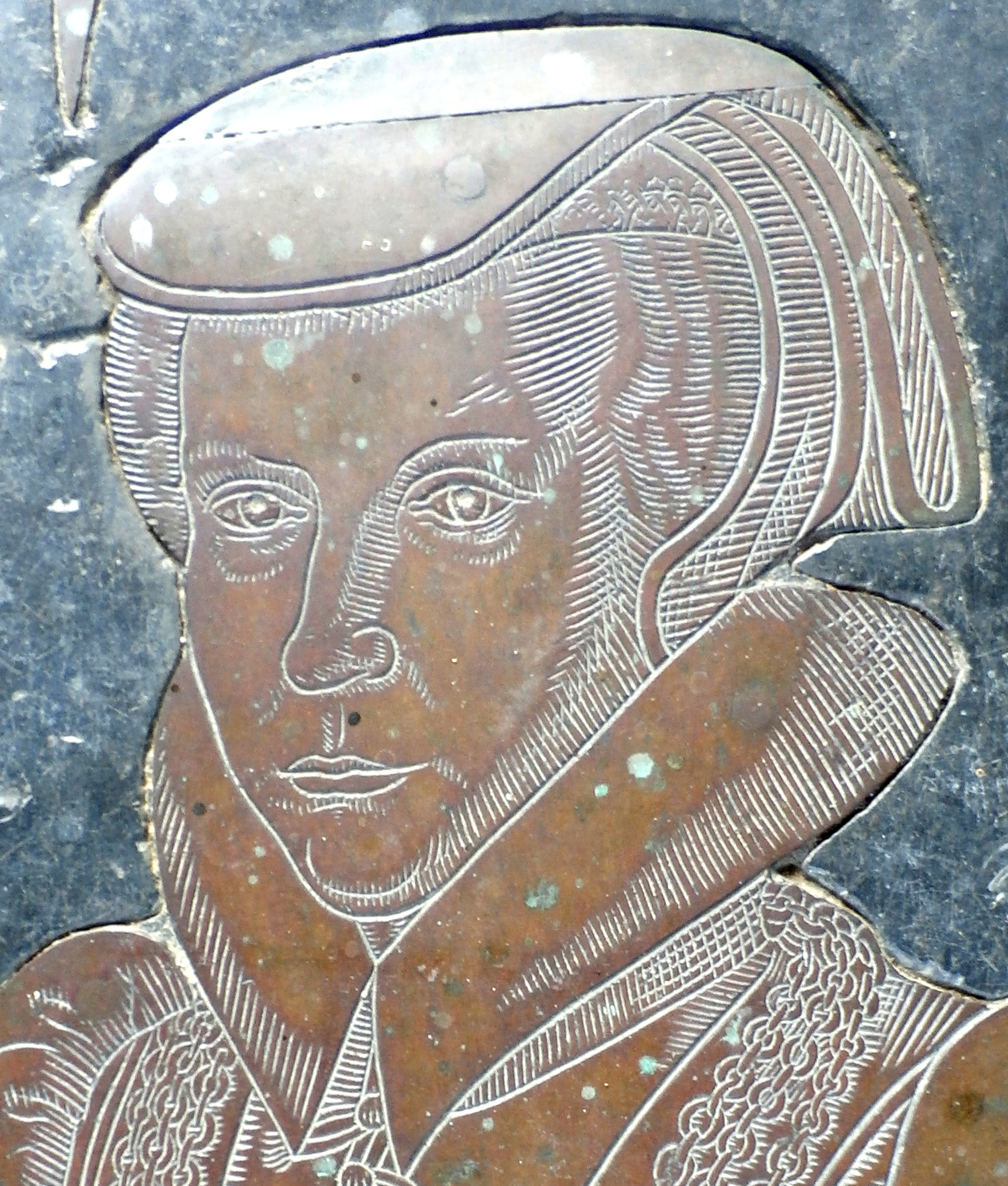
Dorothy Petre (d.1618), wife of Nicholas Wadham. Detail from her monumental brass in St Mary's Church, Ilminster. Almost identical to the brass to her sister-in-law Florence Wadham (1538–1597), wife of John Wyndham (d.1572) of Orchard Wyndham, in St Decuman's Church, Watchet, Somerset

Dorothy Wadham (/ˈwɒdəm/ WOD-əm; née Petre; 1534/1535 – 16 May 1618) was an English landowner and the founder of Wadham College, Oxford, one of the constituent colleges of the University of Oxford. Wadham was the first woman who was not a member of the royal family or titled aristocracy to found a college at Oxford or Cambridge. Her husband was Nicholas Wadham (1531–1609) of Merryfield in the parish of Ilton, Somerset and of Edge in the parish of Branscombe, Devon.

== Family ==
Dorothy was the second and eldest surviving child of the very wealthy Sir William Petre (c.1505–1572), Secretary of State to four successive Tudor monarchs (namely Kings Henry VIII and Edward VI, and Queens Mary I and Elizabeth I), who had acquired much property following the Dissolution of the Monasteries. Her mother was Gertrude Tyrrell, daughter of Sir John Tyrrell. Her date of birth as 1535 may be deduced from one of her two portraits in Wadham College, which gives her age as sixty in 1595. Part of the Petre inheritance received by Dorothy came from grants made by Queen Mary to her father Sir William Petre, of lands formerly held by Lady Jane Grey and forfeited to the crown, which had come in part from the great heiress Cecily Bonville, of Shute, Devon.

== Life ==
When Dorothy's mother Gertrude Tyrrell died on 28 May 1541, she was brought up by Petre's second wife, Anne, who was also a Tyrrell by her first marriage. Later in life, her writing skill and knowledge of Latin was evident, and it is likely that she was educated at her home, Ingatestone Hall, Essex.

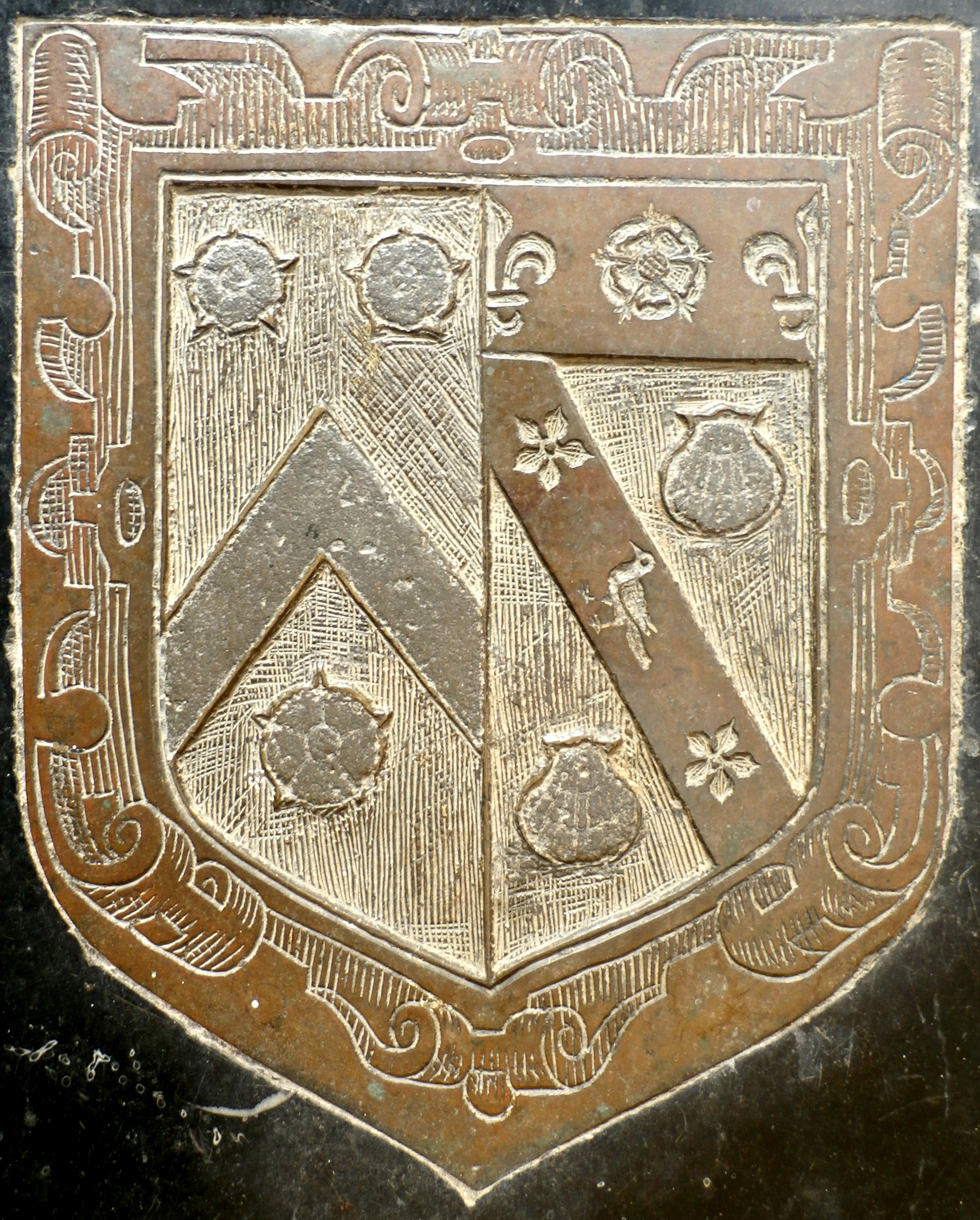
Monumental brass escutcheon on monument to Nicholas Wadham (died 1609) and his wife Dorothy Petre (died 1618), Wadham Chapel, Ilminster Church, Somerset. Arms: Gules, a chevron between three roses argent (Wadham) impaling Gules, on a bend or between two escallops argent a chough proper between two cinquefoils azure on a chief or a rose between two demi-fleurs-de-lys (Petre). These impaled arms were adopted as the arms of Wadham College

On 3 September 1555 at St Botolph, Aldersgate, in the City of London, she married Nicholas Wadham (1531–1609). The couple lived at Nicholas's ancestral "noble moated seat" of Merryfield, in the parish of Ilton, Somerset. They did not have any children.

The Wadhams were possibly recusants or crypto-Catholics at a time when Catholics were under penalties in England. Between 1612 and 1613 Dorothy Wadham had her armoury confiscated because she was suspected of recusancy. In 1615 she was granted a formal pardon under the 1593 Act of Parliament against Popish recusants.

=== Founding of Wadham College ===
Dorothy was the sole executor of Nicholas's will, which provided a bequest "for such uses and purposes" as he had "requested her and she hath assented to". His wishes included the founding of a college in Oxford University, and this Dorothy accomplished, noting that "it would greatly offend my conscience to violate any jot of my husband's will". She added substantial funds from her own great inheritance to the funds left by her late husband in order to finance the building and establishment of the college.

On his deathbed, Nicholas had summoned Sir John Davis to discuss his plans with Dorothy and their two business agents. Nicholas was persuaded by Davis to sign a legal instrument naming him as jointly responsible with Dorothy for effecting Nicholas' plans for a college. Davis had been convicted as a traitor due to his part in the Essex conspiracy, and was a recusant. His inclusion in the design put the plan in jeopardy. In 1610 it was shown in Parliament that Davis had refused the Church of England sacraments. He may have wanted Wadham's foundation to be governed by his own former college, Gloucester Hall, Oxford. Dorothy wrote to the Lord High Treasurer, Robert Cecil, a month after Nicholas's death, denying Davis's accusation that she did not intend to proceed with Nicholas's plans. An offer was made to Gloucester Hall, which was refused by the Principal unless he was made head of the new foundation. Nicholas had intended an offer be made to Jesus College, Oxford, but no evidence of such exists.

A site was acquired in February 1610 and the architect William Arnold was commissioned for the construction of the college. A letter from King James I to Oxford City Council persuaded the Council to lower the asking price for the site. Dorothy managed to loosen Davis's ties by way of a collusive suit in chancery in July 1610, which established a trust excluding him. Her brother John Petre, 1st Baron Petre was key in raising support in Parliament, but Dorothy refused his offer of taking over the responsibility "which my dear husband so solely and absolutely trusted me with".

On 20 December 1610 Wadham College received royal letters patent, and its statutes were approved by Dorothy in 1612. The college was formally instituted in April 1613. The appointment of the Warden, Fellows, and Scholars, and even on occasion the college cook, rested with Dorothy, as shown by a series of letters written by her business agent John Arnold, and signed by her. Dorothy never visited the college and relied on Arnold to communicate her wishes to the Warden and Fellows.

== Death and burial ==
Dorothy died on 16 May 1618, at the Wadham dower house, Edge, in the parish of Branscombe, Devon. Her body was taken to Merrifield and was buried on 16 June alongside that of her husband in the Wadham Chapel inside the Church of St Mary, Ilminster, Somerset. The monument to Nicholas and Dorothy Wadham is the principal monument in the church. Their monumental brass is described by A.K. Wickham as "the finest post Reformation brass in England."

== Other honours ==
In 2025, a blue plaque in honour of Wadham was installed at Ingatestone railway station, close to Ingatestone Hall where she grew up.

== Sources ==
- Davies, C. S. L. (23 September 2004). "Wadham [née Petre], Dorothy". Oxford Dictionary of National Biography (online ed.). Oxford University Press. doi:10.1093/ref:odnb/46470. ISBN 978-0-19-861412-8. (Subscription, Wikipedia Library access or UK public library membership required.)
- Davies, C. S. L. (27 September 2023). "A Woman in the Public Sphere; Dorothy Wadham and the Foundation of Wadham College, Oxford". The English Historical Review. 118 (478): 883–911. doi:10.1093/ehr/118.478.883. JSTOR 3491127.
