= David Piper (curator) =

British museum curator and author (1918–1990)

- Born: 21 July 1918; Wimbledon, London, England
- Died: 29 December 1990 (aged 72); Wytham, Oxfordshire, England
- Education: University of Cambridge (MA)
- Occupation: Museum curator
- Employer(s): National Portrait Gallery, London; Fitzwilliam Museum, Cambridge; Ashmolean Museum, Oxford
- Spouse: Anne Horatia (m. 1945)
- Children: 3 daughters and 1 son

Sir David Towry Piper CBE FSA FRSL (21 July 1918 – 29 December 1990) was a British museum curator and author. He was director of the National Portrait Gallery 1964–1967, and of the Fitzwilliam Museum, Cambridge, 1967–1973; and Fellow of Christ's College, Cambridge, 1967–1973, and Director of the Ashmolean Museum, Oxford, 1973–1985 and Fellow of Worcester College, Oxford, 1973–1985. He was knighted in 1983.

The second of three sons of Stephen Harvey Piper, Professor of Physics at Bristol University, Piper was born at Wimbledon and educated at Clifton College and St Catharine's College, Cambridge (where he took a MA).

Piper was Slade Professor of Fine Art at the University of Oxford for 1966–1967.

In 1956, Piper prepared a descriptive catalogue of the Petre family portraits at Ingatestone Hall for the Essex Record Office. He gave the 1968 Aspects of Art Lecture.

Under the pseudonym Peter Towry, Piper wrote a number of novels, including Trial by Battle (1959), a story based on his experiences as an officer in the Indian army, training in Bangalore and then seeing action against the Imperial Japanese Army in Malaya during World War II. He was subsequently a prisoner of war in Japan for three years.

In 1945, Piper married Anne Horatia (1920–2017), daughter of Oliffe Richmond, classics professor at Edinburgh University. She was a novelist and playwright. They had three daughters – Evanthe, Ruth, and Emma – and a son, theatre designer Tom Piper (born 1964).

Piper died in Wytham, Oxfordshire, on 29 December 1990.

== Publications ==
His publications include:

- Petre Family Portraits. Essex Record Office Publication No 26. 1956.
- The English Face. Thames & Hudson. 1957.
- The Companion Guide to London. Collins. 1964.

As Peter Towry:

- Richard said no ... Morrow. 1953.
- It's Warm Inside. Chatto and Windus. 1953.
- Lord Minimus, a Heroic Comedy. Chatto and Windus. 1955.
- Trial by Battle. Hutchinson. 1959. (reprinted in 2019 by the Imperial War Museum but as by David Piper)
- Please Count Your Change. Macmillan. 1962.

== Bibliography ==
- R. J. B. Walker, 'Piper, Sir David Towry (1918–1990)', rev. Oxford Dictionary of National Biography, Oxford University Press, 2004; online edn, May 2007 accessed 5 March 2013
- "Piper, Sir David (Towry)". Who's Who & Who Was Who. Vol. 1920–2008 (November 2012 online ed.). A & C Black. (Subscription or UK public library membership required.)

Cultural offices
Preceded by Robert Hamilton	Director of the Ashmolean Museum; 1973–1985	Succeeded by Christopher White
