= Edward Greville =

Edward Greville may refer to:

- Edward Greville (Australian politician), member of the New South Wales Legislative Assembly
- Sir Edward Greville (died 1559), High Sheriff of Warwickshire
- Sir Edward Greville (died 1634), English nobleman and member of parliament
