= George Godsalf =

English Catholic convert (died 1592)

George Godsalf (died 1592), of the diocese of Bath, was an English Roman Catholic priest who had been converted to Catholicism by John Payne.

He had gained the B.A. at Oxford and been ordained a Roman Catholic deacon during the brief reign of Queen Mary I of England, but had then become a Protestant on Elizabeth I's accession. Payne re-converted him to Roman Catholicism shortly after Payne's arrival in England in April 1576. Payne then sent Godsalf to Douai, where he arrived on 15 July 1576 to be prepared for the Catholic priesthood, which he then received at Cambrai on 22 December before coming to England in June 1577.

Early in July 1581, Payne and Godsalf were arrested in Warwickshire whilst staying on the estate of Lady Petre (widow of William Petre) through an informer.

After being examined by Walsingham at Greenwich, they were committed to the Tower of London on 14 July. Godsalf did not give in but spent several years in prison, after which he was released from the Marshalsea in September 1585 and banished, dying in Paris in 1592.
