= John Payne (martyr) =

16th-century English Catholic priest, martyr and saint

Saint John Payne
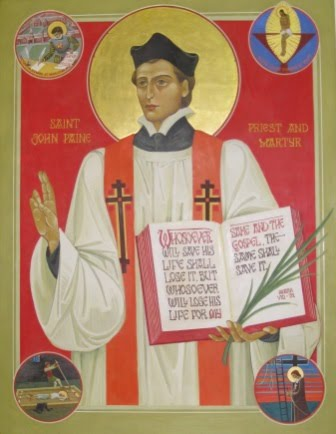
- Icon of Saint John Payne

Martyr
- Born: c. 1532; Peterborough
- Died: 2 April 1582 (aged 49–50); Chelmsford
- Venerated in: Catholic Church
- Beatified: 29 December 1886 by Leo XIII
- Canonized: 25 October 1970 by Pope Paul VI
- Feast: 2 April, 25 October

John Payne (1532–1582) was an English Catholic priest and martyr, one of the Catholic Forty Martyrs of England and Wales.

== Background ==
John Payne was born at Peterborough in 1532. He was probably a mature man when he went to the English College at Douai in 1574, served there as bursar, and was ordained priest by the Archbishop of Cambrai on 7 April 1576.

== Ministry ==
Shortly afterwards, on 24 April 1576, he left for the English mission in the company of another priest, Cuthbert Mayne. While Mayne headed for his native South West England, Payne resided for the most part with Anne, widow of Sir William Petre, and daughter of Sir William Browne, sometime Lord Mayor of the City of London, at Ingatestone, Essex, in whose house was a "priest hole", but also in London. The missioner passed as a steward of Lady Petre. Shortly after his arrival he converted (or re-converted) to Catholicism George Godsalve or Godsalf, of the diocese of Bath, a man who had gained the B.A. at Oxford and had been ordained a deacon in the reign of the Catholic Queen Mary, but who had then become a Protestant. Payne sent Godsalf to Douai, where he arrived on 15 July 1576 to be prepared for the Catholic priesthood, which he was to receive at Cambrai on 22 December. Payne himself was arrested at Ingatestone and imprisoned early in 1577, but was soon released and went back to Douai that November. From there he probably returned to Ingatestone before Christmas, 1579.

== Arrest ==
Early in July 1581, he and Godsalf, who had come to England in June 1577, were arrested in Warwickshire whilst staying on the estate of Lady Petre (widow of William Petre), through the efforts of the informer George "Judas" Eliot (a criminal, murderer, rapist and thief, who made a career out of denouncing Catholics and priests for bounty). After being examined by Walsingham at Greenwich, they were committed to the Tower of London on 14 July. Godsalf did not give in but spent several years in prison, after which he was released from the Marshalsea in September 1585 and banished, dying in Paris in 1592.

Eliot had insinuated himself into a position in the Petre household where he then proceeded to embezzle sums of money. He enticed a young woman from the Roper household and then appealed to Father Payne to marry them; and on his refusal determined to be revenged and make a profit as well.

As to Payne, a more significant catch, he was racked on the Council's orders on 14 August, and again on 31 October. On 20 March 1582 he was abruptly woken, taken from his cell half dressed and delivered by the Lieutenant of the Tower, Sir Owen Hopton (c. 1524–1591) of Cockfield Hall in Suffolk to officers waiting to take him to Chelmsford jail, not being allowed to return to the cell to get his purse - which was purloined by the Lieutenant's wife, Anne Echyngham.

== Trial ==
Payne was indicted at Chelmsford on 22 March on a charge of treason for conspiring to murder the Queen and her leading officers and install Mary, Queen of Scots, on the throne. Payne denied the charges, and affirmed his loyalty to the Queen in all that was lawful (i.e. not contrary to his Catholicism or allegiance to the Pope), contesting the reliability of Eliot. No attempt was made to corroborate Eliot's story, which had already been rehearsed in large part at the trial of Edmund Campion on 20 November 1581. The guilty verdict was a foregone conclusion.

== Execution ==
At his execution on the morning of the Monday 2 April (nine months after his imprisonment), he was dragged from prison on a hurdle to the place of execution and first prayed on his knees for almost half an hour and then kissed the scaffold, made a profession of faith and declared his innocence. Reinforcements had been sent from London to help the execution run smoothly. Lord Rich called upon him to repent of his treason, which Payne again denied. A Protestant minister then shouted a claim that years ago Payne's brother had admitted to him Payne's treason. Payne said that his brother was and always had been an earnest Protestant but that even so would never swear to such a thing. To bear this out, Payne asked that the brother, who was in the locality, be brought, but he was not found in time and the execution proceeded and Payne was at last turned off the ladder. The government's intentions for a smooth execution with minimal trouble and maximum propaganda value had failed – indeed, the crowd had become so sympathetic to Payne that they hung on his feet to speed his death and prevented the infliction of the quartering until he was dead. The executioner, Simon Bull, was meanwhile rebuked for dithering over the quartering in case Payne revive and suffer further.

== Beatification and canonisation ==
John Payne was one of the group of prominent Catholic martyrs of the persecution who were later designated as the Forty Martyrs of England and Wales. He was beatified "equipollently" by Pope Leo XIII, by means of a decree of 29 December 1886 and was canonised along with the other Martyrs of England and Wales by Pope Paul VI on 25 October 1970.

== Schools and churches ==
A Roman Catholic secondary school in Chelmsford (towards Broomfield) is now named after him. The name of the school is St John Payne Catholic School.

The Roman Catholic church of St John Payne is found on Colchester's Greenstead estate. Founded in 1972, the Parish of Greenstead, Ardleigh and Mistley serves the community on the Essex-Suffolk border, with St John Payne being the Parish Church.

== Sources ==
The most reliable compact source is Godfrey Anstruther, Seminary Priests, St Edmund's College, Ware, vol. 1, 1968, pp. 133–134, 311–313.
