= Passe-dix =

Dice game

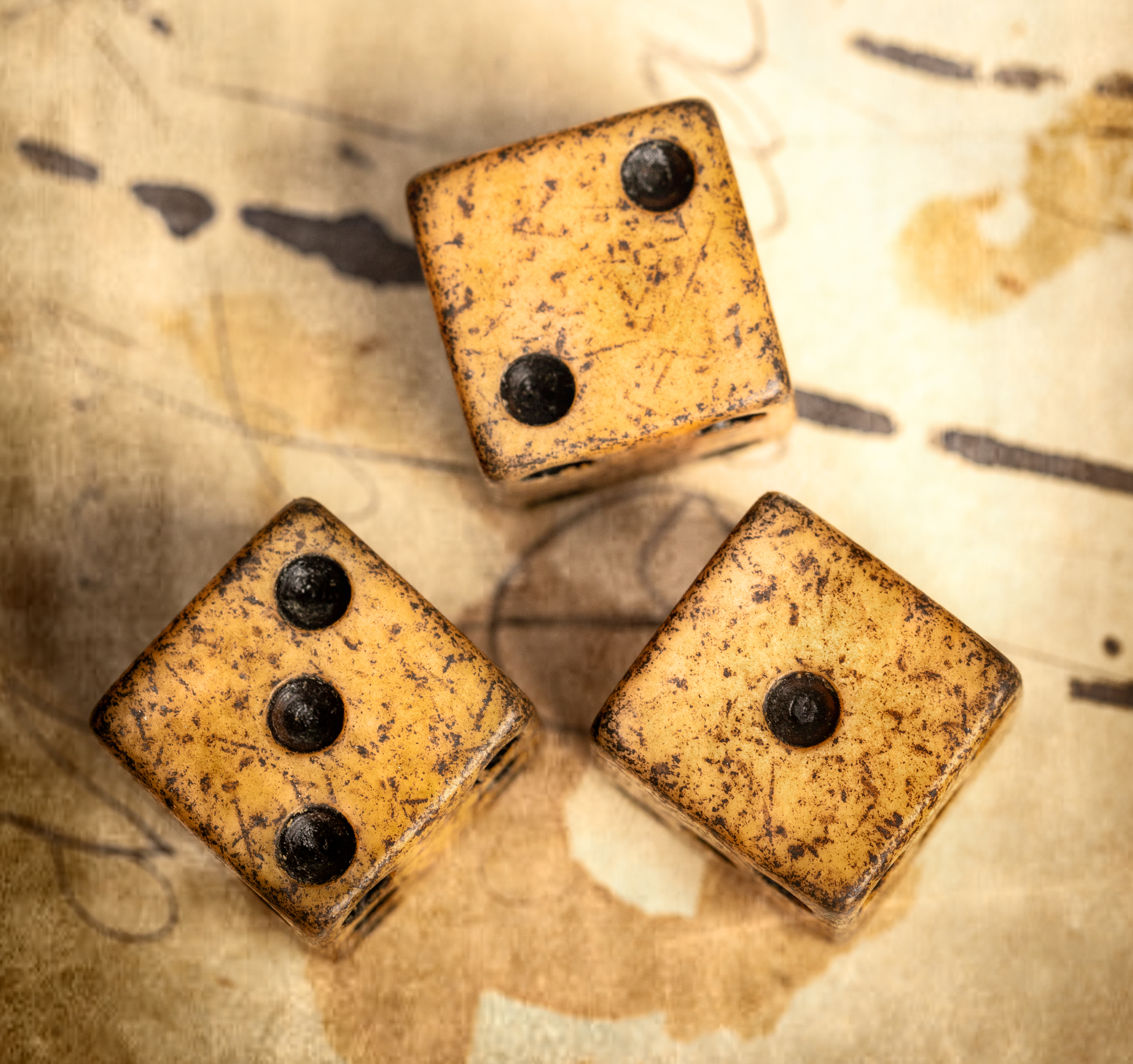
The game of passe-dix is played with three dice

Passe-dix, also called passage in English, is a game of chance using dice.

== Gameplay ==
It was described by Charles Cotton in The Compleat Gamester (1674) thus:

Passage is a Game at dice to be played at but by two, and it is performed with three Dice. The Caster throws continually until he hath thrown Dubblets under ten, and then he is out and loseth; or Dubblets above ten, and then he passeth and wins.

Andrew Steinmetz, in The Gaming Table: Its Votaries and Victims, described it at greater length but somewhat ambiguously (the results of rolling a 10 are unclear, depending on whether it wins for the bank or is a push, the house advantage is at best 0, and at worst negative):

Passe-dix is one of the, possibly the, most ancient of all games of chance, is said to have actually been made use of by the executioners at the crucifixion of our Saviour, when they parted his garments, casting lots, Matt. xxvii. 35.

It is played with three dice. There is always a banker, and the number of players is unlimited. Each gamester holds the box by turns, and the other players follow his chance; every time he throws a point under ten he, as well as the other players, loses the entire stakes, which go to the banker. Every time he throws a point above ten (or passes ten -- whence the name of the game), the banker must double the player's stakes and the stakes of all those who have risked their money on the same chance. When the game is played by many together, each gamester is banker in his turn.

== History ==
In September 1553, a courtier lent money to William Petre to play at "pass dice" with Mary I of England at Hampton Court.

== In Germany ==
In southern Germany, playing passe-dix (or "Paschen") is a New Year's Eve tradition, which dates to the Late Middle Ages.

The rules of Paschen vary, but the following account, found in the 1896 Brockhaus Konversationslexikon is typical. The banker first wagers an ante, known as the banco. The punters either place their own bets, the sum of which must equal the banco, or one punter goes alone and wagers a stake equal to the banco themselves before the banker rolls three dice. If the sum of the dice is eleven or higher, then the banker wins; if the sum is between 3 and 10, the punters win by a ratio of 1:1. It is typical for the role of the banker to pass to their right-hand neighbour on a loss. Another typical rule is that the banker must re-roll if triples of any number are rolled.

In the present, it is common for wins to be pooled, and for sweet pastries to be bought with them and eaten by the entire party.
