= Sir Edward Greville (died 1634) =

English nobleman and Member of Parliament

Sir Edward Greville (c. 1566 – 1634) of Milcote, Warwickshire was an English nobleman and Member of Parliament.

== Life ==
He was the second son of Ludovic Greville and Thomasina or Thomasine, daughter of Sir William Petre of Ingatestone Hall, Essex and his second wife Anne Browne. His father was pressed to death for murder in 1589 and he inherited the family estates in Gloucestershire and Warwickshire, his elder brother having previously died.

He was MP for Warwickshire in the Parliaments of 1593 and 1604 and chosen High Sheriff of Warwickshire for 1594. In August 1594 he travelled with the Earl of Sussex to Stirling Castle for ceremonies and masques at the christening of Prince Henry of Scotland.

He volunteered for the 1597 Azores expedition and in the same year became commissioner for the discovery of goods of recusants, a role he held for at least two years. He had been knighted by 4 November 1597 and served as Justice of the Peace for Warwickshire and Gloucestershire from around 1592 to at least 1608. He carried out inquiries into lands owned by those involved in the Gunpowder Plot in Warwickshire in 1606 and had become a Gentleman of the Privy Chamber by 1625.

His marriage was licensed on 20 May 1583 and was to Joan Bromley (died 1636, daughter of Sir Thomas Bromley of Rodd Castle and Hodnet, Shropshire. They had a son and 5 daughters. His daughter Mary became the third wife of Arthur Ingram.
