= St John Payne Catholic School =

School in Essex, England

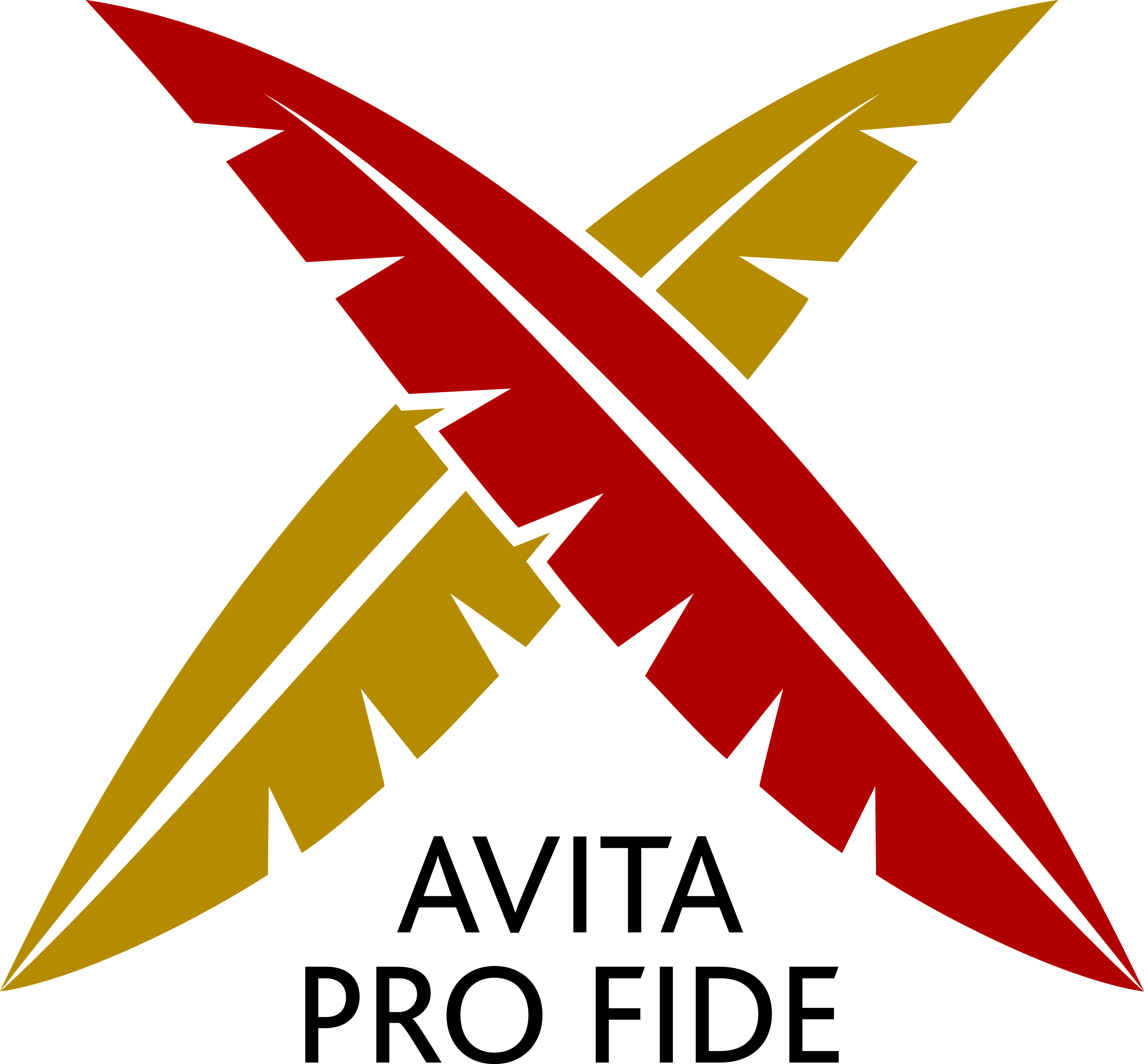

Location
- Patching Hall Lane; Chelmsford, Essex, CM1 4BS; England; 51°45′07″N 0°27′47″E

Information
- Type: Voluntary aided school
- Motto: Avita Pro Fide (Zeal for the Faith)
- Religious affiliation: Roman Catholic
- Established: 1959
- Local authority: Essex
- Department for Education URN: 115238 Tables
- Ofsted: Reports
- Gender: Coeducational
- Age: 11 to 19
- Enrolment: 1250
- Houses: Augustinian, Benedictine, Carmelite, Dominican, Franciscan, Servite
- Website: http://www.sjp.essex.sch.uk/

Saint John Payne Catholic School is a Roman Catholic voluntary aided school in Chelmsford, Essex, England. Established in 1959, the school serves the mid Essex deanery in the Diocese of Brentwood. The school holds strong ties with the Catholic Church, while upholding a prevalent Catholic ethos within school life.

== School history ==
Blessed John Payne Roman Catholic School was opened in 1959 in the original building now called the Bosco Building after St John Bosco. Later the school was expanded with the addition of a second building, now called the Merici building. It became known as St John Payne Roman Catholic School after Pope Paul VI canonized John Payne, one of the Forty Martyrs of England and Wales on 25 October 1970. In 1977 the former Chelmsford Technical High School building was acquired by the Roman Catholic Diocese of Brentwood and this is now known as the Aquinas building. In 2018, the school's Sixth Form building was opened, and named after St Anne Line. It was officially opened by Rev. Dr. Alan Williams in October 2018.

These four buildings and the Sports Hall provide the teaching areas in the school which sit in 25 acres of grounds. The Columbus School and College are close neighbours and students from St John Payne often are involved with liaison and support activities.

The current headteacher is Thomas Coen, who was appointed in 2018.

The school's motto is Avita Pro Fide which means Zeal for the Faith.

== House system ==
Upon admission to St John Payne, all pupils are assigned to one of six houses, each named after a religious order. Each house is led by two house captains.

- Augustinians
- Benedictines
- Carmelites
- Dominicans
- Franciscans
- Servites

Students occasionally compete in their respective houses in inter-house sports competitions.

== Notable people ==
Former student

- Sam Ryder (2000–2007), British singer who represented the United Kingdom in the Eurovision Song Contest 2022
