= St Edmund and St Mary's Church, Ingatestone =

Coordinates: 51°40′15″N 0°23′11″E

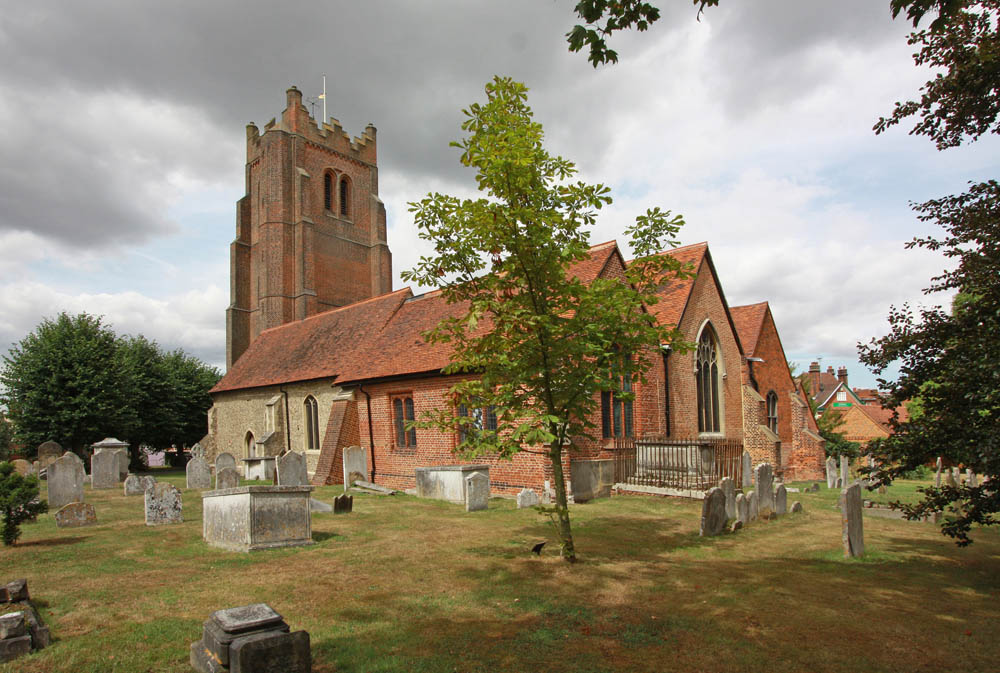
St Edmund and St Mary's from the southeast.

St Edmund and St Mary's Church is the Church of England parish church in the village of Ingatestone in Essex. It dates to the 11th century and received major modifications in the 17th century. Its west tower is in red brick and is described by Simon Jenkins in his 1999 book England's Thousand Best Churches as "magnificent, a unified Perpendicular composition of red brick with black Tudor diapering. Strong angled buttresses rise to a heavy battlemented crown, the bell openings plain."

One of the three pieces of a Sarsen stone is located next to the west door of the church the other two pieces being left either side of Fryerning Lane.

A chapel built onto the chancel contains several family tombs of the Petre family, which lived locally at Ingatestone Hall - these include the monuments of William Petre, his second wife Anne Browne, John Petre, 1st Baron Petre and his wife.

The tower is 83 feet (25 metres) high.

== Sources ==
- "Illington - Ingatestone | British History Online". British-history.ac.uk.
- "Plate 63: Ingatestone, Parish Church of St. Mary and St. Edmund | British History Online". British-history.ac.uk. 5 January 2017.
