= Henry Keble =

Sir Henry Keble (died April 1517) was a grocer and Lord Mayor of London in 1510, in the second year of King Henry VIII's reign. Sir Henry was a leading grocer in London. He was a Merchant of the Staple in Calais. He was originally from Coventry, but had settled in the parish of St Mary Aldermary. He was six times Master of the Grocers' Company. He left bequests to the company, and gave £1,000 to rebuild the church at St Mary Aldermary.

Sir Henry was also an alderman. He was Sheriff of London in 1503 and Lord Mayor in 1510.

Keble's daughter, Alice (d. 1521) married firstly, Sir William Browne (d. 3 June 1514), and after his death, William Blount, 4th Baron Mountjoy. In 1515 Keble, his son-in-law, Lord Mountjoy, and others bought the manor of Apethorpe in Willybrook Hundred, Northamptonshire. He left Apethorpe entailed successively on his son, George Keble, and William Lord Mountjoy and Alice his wife, with remainder to John Browne, Alice's son by Sir William Browne, late Mayor of London.

== Notes ==
Civic offices
Preceded by William Capel	Lord Mayor of London; 1510–1511	Succeeded by Roger Ashley
