= The Petre Pictures =

Collection of portraits and paintings

The Petre Family pictures were a collection of portraits and other paintings housed at Ingatestone Hall and Thorndon Hall. The pictures were initially displayed in the long gallery at Ingatestone Hall. By 1600 the displayed paintings included a portrait of William Petre which remains at Ingatestone Hall. At that time it was the only family portrait on display.

By the end of the 18th century, the collection was housed at Thorndon Hall - the Petre's newly built Palladian mansion. The collection included two works by Stubbs showing members of the Petre family hunting.

In 1878, Thorndon Hall was extensively damaged by a fire which destroyed 23 pictures. Lost works included the Petre's large collection of royal portraits and a possible full-length portrait of the Earl of Portland by van Dyck. Many works were damaged, requiring them to have significant repainting. Following the fire, the family (and its picture collection) occupied the East Wing, but later moved to Ingatestone Hall. Among the paintings in the collection at the time of the fire was a version of the family of Sir Thomas More after Holbein that is now owned by the Chelsea Society.

The collection remains on display at Ingatestone Hall and includes a portrait of Sir William Petre and of 15 of his descendants who bore the title Baron Petre. The exceptions are the 5th, 8th, and 15th Barons.

In 1956, Sir David Piper prepared a descriptive catalogue of the family portraits in the collection for the Essex Record Office.
