= Ingatestone =

Village in Essex, England

Coordinates: 51.670°N 0.380°E

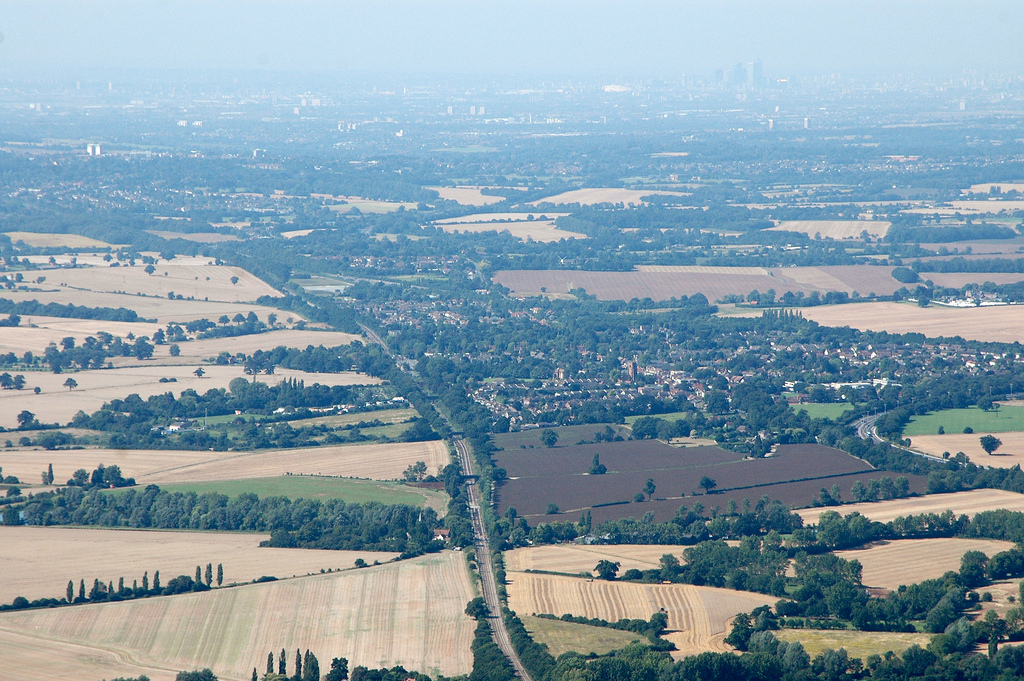
- Aerial view of Ingatestone

- Location within Essex
- Population: 5,410 (Built up area, 2021)
- OS grid reference: TQ645995
- Civil parish: Ingatestone and Fryerning
- District: Brentwood
- Shire county: Essex
- Region: East
- Country: England
- Sovereign state: United Kingdom
- Post town: INGATESTONE
- Postcode district: CM4
- Dialling code: 01277
- Police: Essex
- Fire: Essex
- Ambulance: East of England
- UK Parliament: Brentwood and Ongar

Ingatestone is a village in the civil parish of Ingatestone and Fryerning in the Borough of Brentwood in Essex, England. It lies 5 miles (8 km) north-east of Brentwood and 25 miles (40 km) north-east of Charing Cross in central London. At the 2021 Census the built up area as defined by the Office for National Statistics, which also includes Mountnessing, had a population of 5,410.

Ingatestone was formerly a civil parish; it was merged with Fryerning in 1889. The village is served by Ingatestone railway station on the Great Eastern Main Line railway. Ingatestone grew up along the A12, an old Roman road. The modern road now bypasses Ingatestone to the north-west. The village is surrounded by the Metropolitan Green Belt.

== History ==
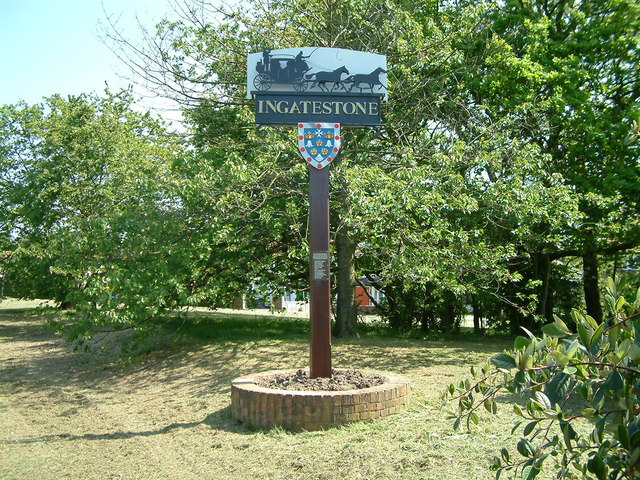
Ingatestone village sign

Ingatestone is one of a number of villages on or near the river Wid to contain an old name, Ing. It is thought that this was the name of a large district that encompassed these places, found in the Domesday Book as Ginga or Inga, part of the Chelmsford Hundred. Its etymology is uncertain, but Eilert Ekwall has proposed the reconstructed Old English name *Gigingas or similar as the original name of the district. He connects this with OE gē (equivalent of Gothic gawi), meaning "district". Gawi is posited as the base of Gauingen in Germany, and is found in several personal names. Ekwall suggests *Gēga or *Giga as possible Essex-dialect personal names (derived from gē) from which *Gigingas (possibly "the people of Giga") may derive.

The territory gradually fragmented into smaller manors and parishes, which took various prefixes and suffixes to distinguish them. Ingatestone was the Inga "at the stone"; it was recorded as Gynges atte Ston in 1283, and as Inge atte Stone in 1433. Fryerning was the Inga of the friars, referring to its ownership by the Knights Hospitallers. Mountnessing was the Inga owned by the Mounteney family, and Margaretting was the Inga with the church dedicated to St Margaret. Buttsbury to the east was historically also called Ginge.

Ingatestone appeared in Saxon times on the Essex Great Road (now the A12) between the Roman towns of Londinium (London) and Camulodunum (Colchester).

A town charter was granted by King Edward I on 5 November 1289, permitting the holding of markets on Saturdays, and an annual fair on 29 August (the Feast of the Beheading of John the Baptist).

The village is built on boulder clay lands. The village stone, deposited by glacial action, is unusual for the area. A large Sarsen stone can still be seen, split into three, with one piece by the west door of the St Edmund and St Mary's parish church and one each side of the entrance to Fryerning Lane.

Ingatestone belonged to Barking Abbey from about 950 AD until the Dissolution of the Monasteries, when it was purchased from the Crown by Sir William Petre. Petre, originally a lawyer from Devon, had risen to become the Secretary of State to Henry VIII. He built a large courtyard house, Ingatestone Hall, as his home in the village, along with almshouses which still exist today as private cottages in Stock Lane.

By the time of the Domesday Book in 1086, Fryerning and Ingatestone (Inga) were assigned to the Hundred of Chelmsford, as part of the land of St Mary of Barking with a value of 60 shillings (£3), held by Robert Gernon in demesne.

By the 18th century, Ingatestone had become a coaching centre; however, the advent of the railway saw its importance decrease, along with the traffic on the Essex Great Road. By 1881, the parish had a population of 926, and on 24 March 1889 the parishes of Ingatestone and Fryerning merged to form Ingatestone and Fryerning, encompassing an area of almost 4,000 acres (16 km^{2}). Ingatestone grew further in the 20th century as commuters moved in, attracted to the surrounding countryside.

Plans to bypass the narrow Roman road through the village were first drawn up before the Second World War, but construction of a dual-carriageway bypass did not begin until 1958. Further dual-carriageway sections of the A12 trunk road were added in the 1960s, to bypass Brentwood and Chelmsford.

== Geology ==
Ingatestone lies just to the north of the southernmost limit of glaciation in the British Isles. Surface deposits over much of the area consist of boulder clay and it is only to the north-east that there are more sandy deposits. Geologist Ciara Lovatt conducted several rock mineral experiments on deposits within Ingatestone in the 1980s. The glacial deposits overlie London clay, which can be seen occasionally in the bed of the River Wid and its tributaries.

The geology of the area is responsible for the landscape and the character of farming in surrounding area. Crop farming is the typical use of boulder clay lands. The sandy deposits to the north-east of Ingatestone are a contributory factor in the greater incidence of woodland and non-arable land in this area.

== Places of interest ==
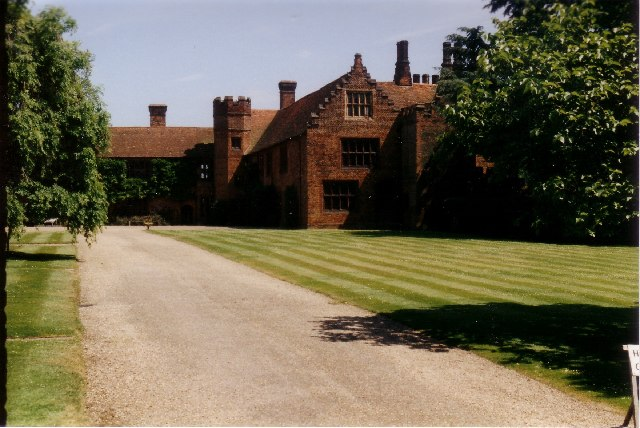
Ingatestone Hall, seat of the Petre family since Tudor times

Ingatestone Hall has been the home of the Petre family since the 16th century, who reside there to this day. There is a tomb monument to members of the family in the parish church of St Edmund and St Mary's.

The hall is currently open as a tourist attraction. It largely retains its Tudor appearance, following restoration carried out between 1915 and 1937, and is set in formal gardens surrounded by eleven acres (4.5 hectares) of grounds. Inside is a range of antique furniture, paintings and other historical artefacts. Queen Elizabeth I spent several nights at the hall on her Royal Progress of 1561. St. John Payne, one of the Forty Martyrs of England and Wales, resided at Ingatestone Hall in the late 16th century as chaplain and steward for Lady Petre. He was martyred at Chelmsford in 1582. The smallpox inoculator, Daniel Sutton, made his base on Ingatestone High Street in Brandiston House and carried out much of his work here.

== Economy ==
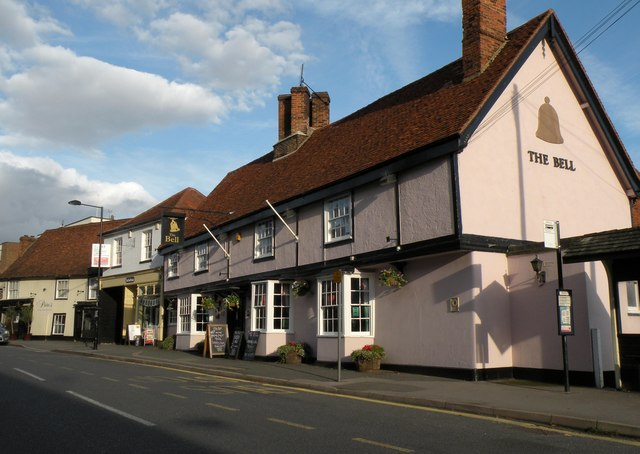
The Bell public house

Ingatestone has over a hundred shops and businesses. Among the retail outlets, there are two small supermarkets (Budgens and Co-op) as well as many retail and industrial shops.

There are two public houses in the High Street. The tiny Star Inn is the older, dating back to the 15th century. It features low-beamed ceilings and a large, open log fire. The Bell is a traditionally styled pub, with a substantial Elizabethan brick fireplace in the lounge bar. A third pub, The Crown, was shut after a police raid in 2011 discovered cannabis being grown there. It has now become the Crown Mews development.

== Amenities ==
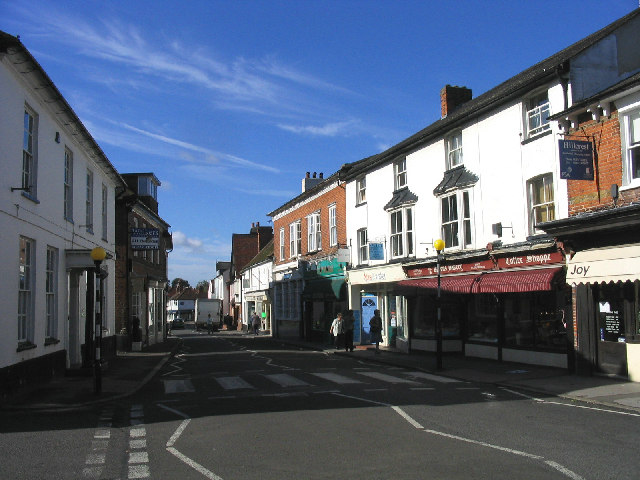
High Street, Ingatestone

Ingatestone has over 40 clubs and societies, ranging from arts and sports clubs to charitable societies. They include the Ingatestone and Fryerning Dramatic Club, founded in 1947; the Ingatestone Choral Society, established in 1948; the Ingatestone Horticultural Society, which was formed in 1963 and is affiliated to the Royal Horticultural Society, the Ingatestone and Fryerning Historical and Archaeological Society, founded in 1965, and the Ingatestone Musical and Operetta Group, founded in 1970. There is also a Community Association, which meets at a large hall in High Street. Other amenities include a recreation ground, a sports field, and bowls and tennis clubs.

The Rotary Club is active and sponsored a war memorial in 2005 to mark the movement's centenary. The memorial, in the village's Anglican churchyard, is dedicated to the memory of the men of Ingatestone who served and fell in the two world wars.

There are two parks. Seymour Field was renamed after 'Skip' Seymour, a former headteacher of a local school, in 1977; it was known previously as Transport Meadow, having been donated to the village by the Ministry of Transport after the construction of the first A12 bypass in 1959. The other park is the Fairfield, a historic site of village fairs, which is privately owned by the Petre family and leased to the parish council.

There are four places of worship in Ingatestone: Anglican, Roman Catholic, Elim Pentecostal and United Reformed.

The local community comes together for key annual events, including a Victorian-themed Christmas evening in the High Street and a free annual firework display on the Fairfield on New Year's Eve.

Ingatestone has a community magazine called the Ingatestone Journal, delivered to residents of Ingatestone, Stock and Margaretting; it covers local issues and events, and enables businesses to advertise their services.

== Governance ==
There are three tiers of local government covering Ingatestone and Fryerning, at parish, district, and county level: Ingatestone and Fryerning Parish Council, Brentwood Borough Council, and Essex County Council. The parish council is based at 4 The Limes in the centre of Ingatestone.

Ingatestone was an ancient parish in the Chelmsford Hundred of Essex. The parish had complicated boundaries with the neighbouring parish of Fryerning. A large part of the built up area of Ingatestone was actually in Fryerning parish, and through the centre of the village the boundary followed the main street. Ingatestone parish also had a large detached rural exclave to the north of Fryerning parish. The complicated boundaries likely arose from them having anciently been created from the subdivision of an earlier territory.

In 1889 the two parishes were merged into a new civil parish called Ingatestone and Fryerning. When elected parish and district councils were established in 1894, Ingatestone and Fryerning was given a parish council and included in the Chelmsford Rural District. The parish was transferred to Brentwood district in 1974.

The Ingatestone built up area as defined by the Office for National Statistics extends beyond Ingatestone and Fryerning parish to also include the neighbouring village of Mountnessing.

Ingatestone has two conservation areas: one covering the railway station and Station Lane, with the other protecting the central shopping area of High Street.

== Education ==
The village has three schools:

- Ingatestone Infant School, teaching children between the ages of four and seven.
- Ingatestone and Fryerning Church Of England Voluntary Aided Junior School, teaching children between the ages of seven and eleven from years 3 to 6.
- The Anglo European School, a self-governing state school for children aged from eleven to nineteen, specialising in language study. It was the first state school in Britain to offer the International Baccalaureate Diploma and the first to become a Language College.

== Transport ==
The route of the A12 trunk road once passed through the centre of the village, but has since been bypassed. It provides direct access to East London, Chelmsford, Colchester, Ipswich, Harwich and Lowestoft; it also connects to the M25 motorway 7 miles (11 km) away.

Ingatestone railway station is a stop on the Great Eastern Main Line. It is served Monday to Saturday by an off-peak service of two Greater Anglia southbound trains an hour to London Liverpool Street, with one each to Clacton-on-Sea and Braintree northbound; rush-hour trains to London are more frequent. On Sundays, there are hourly trains to Liverpool Street and Ipswich.

The village is served by First Essex's route 351, which provides regular services to Chelmsford, Brentwood and Warley. School services are operated by First Essex and NIBS Buses.

== Sport ==
Ingatestone and Fryerning Cricket Club plays in the Premier Division and Divisions 7 and 12 of the T Rippon Mid-Essex League as well as having mid-week and youth sides. Founded in 1858, it celebrated its 160th anniversary in 2018, although cricket was played in Ingatestone much earlier, with matches dating back to 1772. The club was famous as one of the best in Essex in the 1780s and played against teams from Maldon, Stock, Brentwood, Navestock, Mountnessing and Herongate. Fryerning Cricket Club was formed in 1824 and the two clubs joined together in 1858. The club has links with Essex County Cricket Club and is introducing a women's team.

The village also has two football teams: Redstones Football Club and Stones Athletic Youth Football Club.

== Notable people ==
- The novelist and musician Alice Diehl lived in Ingatestone shortly before her death in 1912.
- Sound poet and musician Henri Chopin lived in an old house by the railway station in the 1970s and 1980s.
- The actress Sarah Miles and her director brother, Christopher Miles, were born in Ingatestone.
- The noted naturalist and entomologist Sheffield Airey Neave lived in the village following his retirement.
- Historian and author Ian Yearsley was born in Ingatestone.
- The pioneer of radio and television Simeon Aisenstein lived here towards the end of his life.
- The composer William Byrd was born here.
