= William Petre =

16th-century English politician

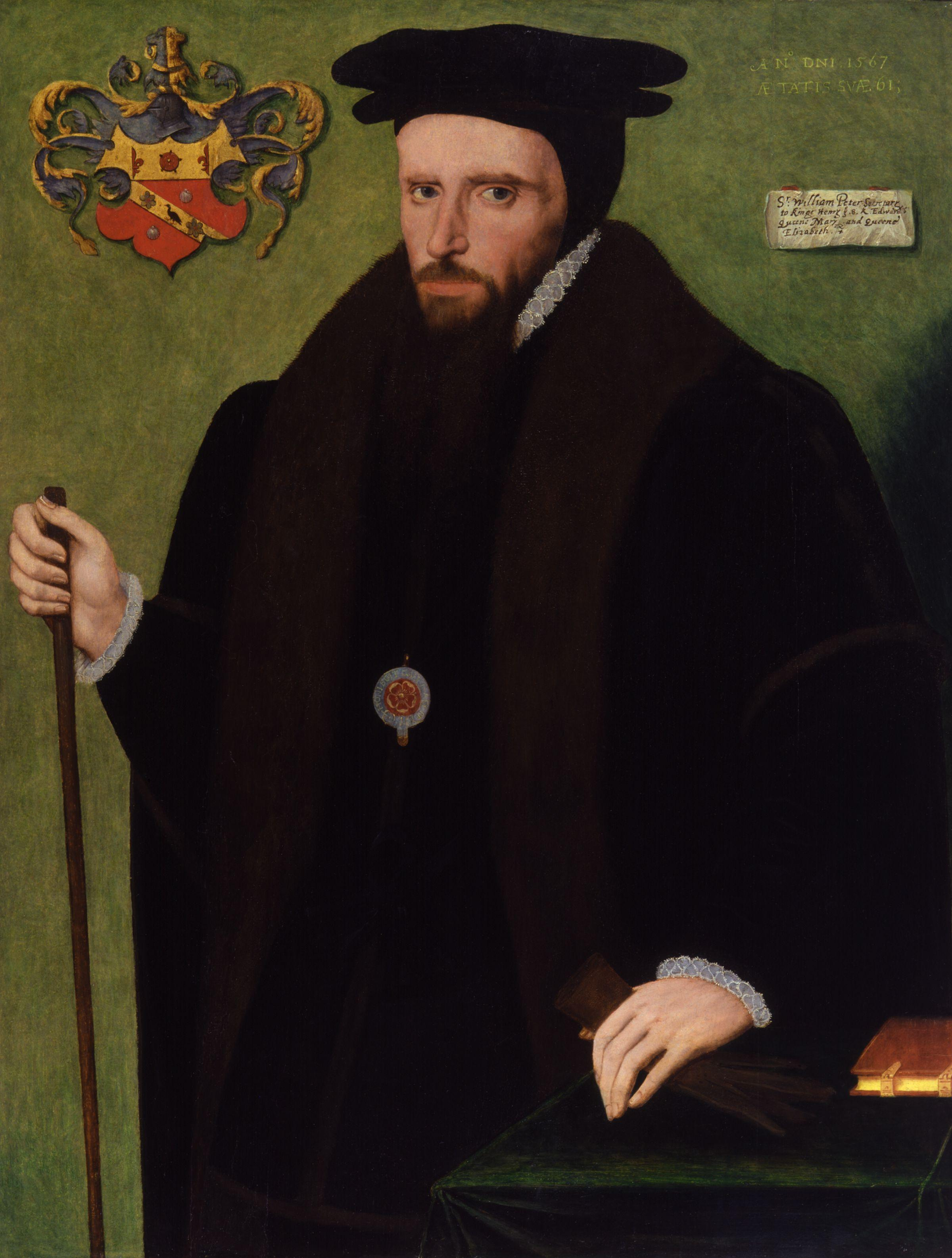
Sir William Petre. The sitter is identified both by his armorials (upper left) and in the cartellino (upper right). This form of cartellino was often added to portraits in the Lumley collection. A copy without the cartellino is among the Petre Pictures

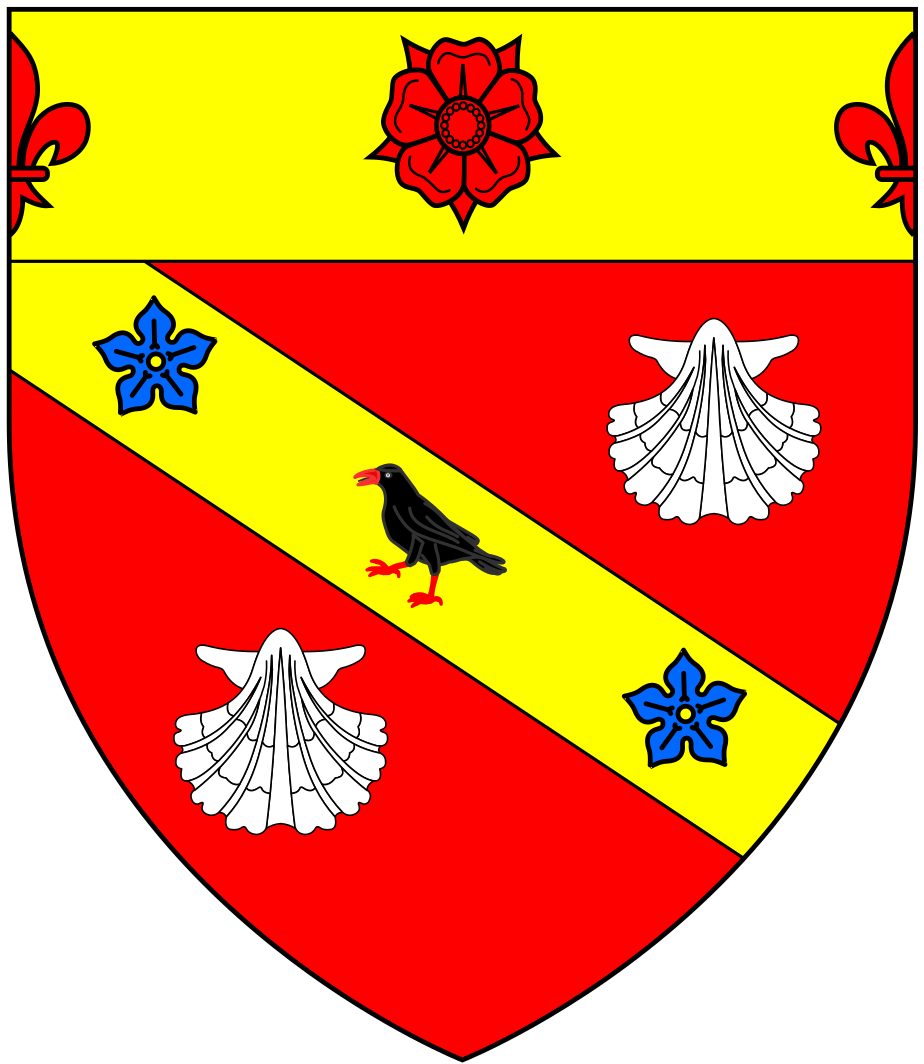
Arms of Sir William Petre: Gules, on a bend or between two escallops argent a Cornish chough proper between two cinquefoils azure on a chief of the second a rose between two demi-fleurs-de-lis palewise of the first

Sir William Petre (c. 1505 – 1572) (pronounced Peter) was Secretary of State to three successive Tudor monarchs, namely Kings Henry VIII and Edward VI, and Queen Mary I. He also deputised for the Secretary of State to Elizabeth I.

Educated as a lawyer at the University of Oxford, he became a public servant, probably through the influence of the Boleyn family, one of whom, George Boleyn, he had tutored at Oxford and another of whom was Queen Anne Boleyn, second wife of King Henry VIII. He rose rapidly in the royal service and was knighted in 1543.

Sir William Petre was adept at side-stepping the great religious controversies of the day; in January 1544 he was appointed Secretary of State. He navigated the ship of state through the rest of Henry's troubled reign, managing a smooth succession in 1547. He held high office throughout the reigns of Henry VIII, Edward VI, Mary I, and Elizabeth I until, owing to ill health he retired a rich man to his manor of Ingatestone, in Essex, where he had built Ingatestone Hall. His son was John Petre, 1st Baron Petre of Writtle, raised to the peerage in 1603. The later Barons Petre have mostly been Roman Catholics.

The musician William Byrd wrote a Pavan and a Galliard for Sir William Petre, which were published as part of his Parthenia.

William Byrd, acquired the lease of Stondon Manor in Essex from its previous occupant, William Shelley, who had been condemned to death for his alleged involvement in the so-called Popish Plot. The manor was situated in close proximity to Ingatestone Hall, the residence of his patrons, the Catholic Petre family.

== Origins ==
Born in about 1505 or 1506, Petre was the eldest son of John Petre of Tor Newton in the parish of Torbryan, Devon, by his wife Alice Colling, daughter of John Colling of Woodland, Devon. The Petre family had been established at Tor Newton from at least the reign of King Richard II (1377–1399). John Petre was by trade a tanner and both of his grandfathers were franklins (small landowners). His brothers included:

- John Petre (died 1571), Customer of the ports of Dartmouth and Exeter in Devon and MP for Dartmouth in 1554.
- Richard Petre, Archdeacon of Buckingham.
- Robert Petre, an auditor of the Exchequer, whose monument survives in Ingatestone Church, Essex. He received a grant of arms in 1573.

== Education ==
In 1519 Petre matriculated at the University of Oxford as a law student. He is claimed as a member of Exeter College, of which he was later a benefactor, but there is no evidence of him there as an undergraduate. In 1523 he became a Fellow of All Souls College, Oxford, of which he was law bursar in 1528/9. On 2 July 1526 he graduated Bachelor of both laws, and in 1527 and 1528 practised as a lawyer in Oxford.

== Political life ==
Petre's career is strikingly similar to those of other statesmen of his time, such as William Cecil, 1st Baron Burghley, John Mason, and Richard Rich, 1st Baron Rich, who, 'sprung from the willow rather than the oak', and served with equal fidelity Kings Henry and Edward, and Queens Mary and Elizabeth, surviving all contemporary political and religious storms. Among mid-Tudor privy councillors, Petre is unique in his unbroken service; he alone escaped execution, imprisonment in the Tower, house arrest, disgrace, fine, exile, or enforced retirement. As a diplomat, his manner was 'smooth, reserved, resolved, yet obliging'. At Boulogne in 1550, Chatillion said of Petre "Ah, we had gained the last two hundred thousand crowns without hostages, had it not been for that man who said nothing".

In his later years, he was said to be a Catholic, a creed to which his descendants have consistently adhered. Nevertheless, his piety was not uncompromising, and did not stand in the way of his temporal advancement. Though he was less rapacious than his colleagues in profiting by the fall of Somerset, Petre acquired enormous property by the dissolution of the monasteries; in Devonshire alone he is said to have secured 36,000 acres (150 km^{2}); but his principal seat was at Ingatestone which he received on the dissolution of the abbey of St. Mary's Barking.

Though so occupied in politics, he seems to have been a man with wider interests; a considerable portion of his wealth was spent on charitable objects; he founded almshouses at Ingatestone, and designed scholarships for All Souls College, Oxford, but his chief benefactions were to Exeter College, Oxford, and entitle him to be considered its second founder. In other ways, Petre was a patron of learning; his correspondence with English envoys abroad contains frequent requests for rare books. He was himself governor of Chelmsford Grammar School, and Ascham benefited by his favour, which he is said to have requited by dedicating to Petre his Osorius de Nobilitate Christiana. A mass of Petre's correspondence has been summarised in the 'Calendars of State Papers', and many of the originals are in the Cottonian, Harleian, and Additional Manuscripts in the British Museum; his transcript of the notes for Edward VI's will is in the Inner Temple Library.

William was educated at the great West Country college of Exeter, at Oxford, arriving there in 1520 when he was about 14 (the usual age at that time), from whence he was elected Fellow of All Souls in 1523 where he graduated Bachelor of Civil and Canon Law on 2 July 1526 (both colleges were generously endowed by him later). Proficient both in Roman (administrative) and ecclesiastical law, in about 1527, he became Principal of Peckwater's Inn or Vine Hall, and tutor to George Boleyn (son of the Earl of Wiltshire and afterwards Viscount Rochford). It was no doubt through the influence of Boleyn's sister Anne that Petre came to the notice of Thomas Cromwell (she sent him presents, and promised him any pleasure it was in her power to give) and was introduced at court and selected for government service. He was sent abroad and resided on the continent, chiefly in France, for more than four years. On his return, he was appointed a Clerk in Chancery and All Souls made him Doctor of Civil Law on 17 February 1532.

In 1534, William and Edmund Walsingham examined Anne Husee on the charge of addressing Henry's daughter Mary as Princess when Anne had stayed with her at Hunsdon, and whether she thought her the lawful daughter of the king. Anne Husee, knowing her head to be in danger if she continued to support Mary, took the more prudent way and besought pardon. 'She most humbly beseecheth his Highness of mercy and forgiveness, as One that is repentant for that she hath so offended and purposeth never hereafter to fall in to semblable danger, – signed Anne Husee, countersigned Edmund Walsyngham. Per me Gulielmum Petre'.

He was only about thirty when he was already in high favour with Cranmer and Cromwell, who spoke in November 1535 of making Petre dean of arches, there 'being no man more fit for it'.

On 13 January 1536, he was appointed deputy or proctor for Cromwell in his capacity as Vicar-General and appointed Visitor of the greater monasteries in Kent and other southern counties, being especially active in the West Country. In the same year, he was made Master in Chancery, was placed on a commission to receive and examine all bulls and briefs from Rome, and granted the prebend of Langford Ecclesia in Lincoln Cathedral, which he resigned the following year. On 16 June 1536, Petre appeared in Convocation and made a novel claim to preside over its deliberations, on the ground that the King was supreme head of the church, Cromwell was the King's vicegerent, and he was Cromwell's deputy. After some discussion, his claim was allowed. In 1537, he was employed to examine Robert Aske and other prisoners taken in the Lincolnshire and Yorkshire rebellions.

Soon he was actively visiting and aiding in the suppression of the smaller monasteries; he was one of the most zealous of the visitors. Among the twenty monasteries he visited and procured the surrender of in 1538 were, perhaps, St. Leonard's, Thoby and Blackmore. In the first three months of 1539, thirteen more fell before him; he being instrumental in the almost total extirpation of the Gilbertines, the only religious order of English origin. A few years later, he was Visitor of the greater monasteries in Kent and the South of England.

=== Secretary of State to Henry VIII ===
In 1539, Petre was one of those appointed to prepare a bill for the enactment of 'The Six Articles', and in the following year was on the commission that declared the nullity of Henry's marriage with Anne of Cleves. Early in 1543, he was knighted, appointed Secretary of State in Wriothesley's place and placed on various commissions to inquire into causes of supposed heresy. In 1544, Henry made William a Privy Councillor, and on 9 July 1544, one of his two Principal Secretaries selected to assist Queen Katherine in carrying on the Regency in the small 'Regency Council' during Henry's absence, and to raise supplies for the King's expedition to Boulogne. In 1545, he was sent abroad as ambassador to the great Emperor Charles V, but at the end of the year was summoned back to the Privy Council.

Though much occupied with public business, the politician found time and many opportunities to get and lay by great gain for himself. As one of the Visitors of the monasteries, he knew better than many people what properties were worth acquiring. He paid the king some £849 12s 6d (approximately £330,000 today) for the property known as "Ginge Abbes" at Ingatestone, even though the King was trying to raise money and this was a "fair" price it is probably true Sir William got a bargain. Ingatestone, which had previously belonged to Barking Abbey, must have been selected as being a particularly fertile and well-cultivated district at that period, within an easy ride of London, and with the comfortable house of the Abbess's steward, with its fish-ponds and park, easily turned into an excellent country residence for the busy statesman. Here, at Ingatestone Hall, Sir William Petre established himself and his family, and many of his letters are dated from this place.

However, there is some evidence of an institutionalised system of bribery and corruption. Those in public office were expected to charge for favours and salaries were accordingly set very low. Accounts show that by 1540, William was receiving £180 per year in annuities from religious houses he had visited (approximately £70,000 today). If it seems strange that abbeys should give annuities to an individual charged with abolishing them, they were probably bribes either to delay the procedure or to facilitate a pension for the retiring Abbot. William received money from about twenty monasteries.

=== Secretary of State to Edward VI ===
When Henry VIII died in 1547 William was appointed an assistant executor to his will. This gave him much hold over the Protestant and youthful sovereign, Edward VI, and his power, importance and activity rapidly increased. In August 1547, he was entrusted with the Great Seal for use in all ecclesiastical affairs.

In 1547 he was first elected as knight of the shire (MP) for Essex. He was returned for Essex a further eight times in 1553 (twice), 1554 (twice), 1555, 1558, 1559 and 1563. He may have previously sat for Downton in 1536.

In 1549, he served on commissions to visit the University of Oxford inquiring into heresies, to examine the charges against Lord Seymour of Sudeley, and to try the sometime Bishop of London Bonner. He did not take part in Bonner's trial after the first day, and it was rumoured that he 'was turning about to another party'. On 6 October 1549, he was sent by Somerset to the council to demand the reason of their coming together, though at first a supporter of the Protector Somerset. Finding them the stronger party he deserted Somerset just before his fall, remaining to sign the council's letter to the lord mayor denouncing the protector; four days later he also signed the proclamation against Somerset.

By the 1550s, he was very prosperous. Not only was he Secretary of State but he also had many other sinecures such as warden of Bishop of Winchester's lands. He enjoyed many rewards such as free board and lodging at court. In February 1550, he was sent to Boulogne to negotiate the terms of peace with France, and in the following May exchanged ratifications of it at Amiens. William Petre is described as smooth and obliging in manner, yet reserved and resolved, and not given to many words. In the same year, he was treasurer of First Fruits and Tenths and one of the commissioners to examine the Bishop of Winchester Gardiner; he was also sent to New Hall, Essex, to request Princess Mary to come to court or change her residence. William also wrote in terms of friendship to William Cecil in 1551, from Ingatestone, regretting to hear that Cecil is ill, thanking him for a book he had sent, and saying his little ones when they are able shall send him some proof of their progress; and wrote again later to congratulate Cecil on his recovery.

In 1551, Sir William served with Lord Rich of Leigh's Priory as the council's agent in warning Princess Mary not to have the Mass celebrated at New Hall, Boreham and Copped Hall, near Waltham Abbey, her Essex mansions. September 1551 found him laid up at Ingatestone Hall, and unable to travel to Court. He still had many affairs on hand, amongst them a very trivial complaint from the Countess of Southampton, which Sir William forwarded to William Cecil, recommending that her suit be allowed and attended to 'Jane, Countess of Southampton, complains that Hierom Colas, French teacher to her children, has left her service, and begs he may be compelled to return'. In October, he was appointed to confer with the German ambassadors on the proposed Protestant alliance; and in December, he was on a commission for calling in the king's debts.

=== Secretary of State to Mary I ===
As the young Edward VI's health failed, it was necessary to determine what should be done on his death, and a memorial was drawn up and signed by Sir William Petre in May 1553, under the direction of the King and the Privy Council, limiting the succession, in the interest of Lady Jane Grey, to Protestants. Two months later Edward VI was dead and Mary had a powerful party behind her, On 20 July, he, like the majority of the council, declared for Mary, the memorial in Sir William's handwriting was laid on the shelf. He remained in London during the next few days transacting secretarial business, but his wife joined Mary and entered London with her.

Petre had been identified with the council's most obnoxious proceedings towards Mary, and his position was at first insecure. He resumed attendance at the council on 12 August, but in September, it was rumoured that he was out of office. His own accounts record that a courtier lent him money to play at "pass dice" with Mary at Hampton Court in September. Petre was installed Chancellor of the Order of the Garter on 26 September when he was directed by the Queen to expunge the new rules formulated during the late reign.

He further ingratiated himself with Mary by his zeal in tracing the accomplices of Wyatt's rebellion and by his advocacy of the Spanish marriage. Petre now devoted himself exclusively to his official duties; he rarely missed attendance at the council and was frequently employed to consult with foreign ambassadors. He acquiesced in the restoration of the old religion, and took a prominent part in the reception of Pole and ceremonies connected with the absolution of England from the guilt of heresy.

As Petre had acquiesced in the Reformation under Henry VIII, so now he acquiesced in the re-establishment of the Pope's authority and the restoration of the Roman form of service, and was one of the foremost at Cardinal Pole's reception when he came on a mission from the Pope. With his vast Church property, it behoved Sir William to stand well with the new religious authorities; Cardinal Pole had come with instructions not to be too particular about the restoration of abbey lands. Mary approved the scheme drawn up by him. With great dexterity, William succeeded in obtaining a 'Bull of Confirmation' confirming him in possession of the lands he had derived from the suppression of the monasteries. Pope Paul IV granted this on 27 November 1555. This is believed to be a unique document. Sir William was also absolved from the Interdict of Excommunication placed upon Henry VIII. He was allowed to retain his lands, but was exhorted to endow a charity foundation and to provide pensions for the needy inhabitants of Ingatestone, who had been deprived of their accustomed doles from the monasteries by the wholesale dissolution and destruction that had taken place, so largely by the aid of William Petre himself. This bull is a lengthy document, and enumerates all the Church lands Sir William Petre had acquired, and the prices he had paid for them.

It was at Ingatestone Hall, where Queen Mary stopped in her journey to London after her accession, that Petre was sworn her Secretary; and here also that William Cecil offered his obedience, kissed her hand, but lost his appointment as Secretary, which he had shared with his older colleague. Petre was one of the councillors deputed to question Princess Elizabeth in the Tower on Wyatt's rebellion (during which Petre raised a small force for the Queen). He also helped to negotiate Mary's marriage. Mary gave him a diamond ring.

The move was a wise one for a man so heavily weighted with Church property, and his adroitness quickly enabled him to be as indispensable to Mary as he had been to her father and brother. He warmly advocated the Spanish marriage with Philip, and was soon freely consulted by Bishop Gardiner on matters of State policy. He took an active part in discovering the persons implicated in Sir Thomas Wyatt's rising which took place early in 1554 with the object of preventing Mary's marriage and of putting Elizabeth on the throne. After the capture of Wyatt, Sir John Bourne writes from the Tower to tell Secretary Petre that he has been labouring to make Sir Thomas Wyatt confess that the Lady Elizabeth and her servant Sir William St. Loo, were implicated in the matter; but Sir Thomas Wyatt confessed nothing, and Elizabeth, though imprisoned for a time, was spared. In July 1554, Philip landed in England and married Mary. The following year Petre attended at Court and wrote thence to the Earl of Devonshire, in July, that the Queen's hour was daily expected.

By 1556, his income was £3,353 with very modest personal expenses; he wrote to Nicholas Wotton, Dean of Canterbury, desiring Wootton to succeed him as Secretary of State, being himself so out of health.

It was on his advice that Mary in 1557 forbade the landing of the Pope's messenger sent to confer legatine power on William Peto instead of Pole; he was responsible for receiving the first Russian ambassador to England. However, by the end of the year, owing to declining health, he ceased to be Secretary.

Together with Sir William Garrard and Simon Lowe, he was an executor of the will of Maurice Griffith, Bishop of Rochester, the three having also been mourners at his funeral. In consequence of this, these three played a part as the initial trustees in the founding of Friars School, Bangor.

=== Reign of Elizabeth I ===
In the first decade after the 'Act of Settlement', 1559, there was a broad toleration of Catholics and they maintained their positions but in ever decreasing numbers.

Once again, to save his place, Sir William had to change his religion, as did so many others; but he was becoming old – he had all the property he could desire, his health was failing, and politics no longer attracted him as in his younger days. On Elizabeth's accession, Petre was one of those charged to transact all business before the queen's coronation, and was still employed on various state affairs, but his attendances at the council became less frequent. In March 1559, he wrote to William Cecil that he would attend him at the Court if necessary, but wishes to be excused because of the disease of his leg; he did however still deputise for Secretary Cecil during the summer of 1560, when Cecil was in Scotland. However, he still had many years of official life before him. He resided much at Ingatestone Hall in those later days, and he can be found writing from there in 1561 about the Portuguese restrictions on English merchants in the Indies.

One of Petre's last public duties was to take charge of Lady Katherine Grey at Ingatestone Hall in 1564–1566. Katherine, a younger sister of the ill-fated Lady Jane, had married the Earl of Hertford without Queen Elizabeth's consent. Elizabeth was furious. The care of her seems to have been the last public charge undertaken by William Petre: from 1566 he practically retired and devoted himself to his charitable foundations. He wrote again to Cecil that he was too ill to go abroad, though recovered of his fever, and wished to retire "to my poore house at Ingatestone", where he thinks the open air would do him good.

=== Retirement ===
Thomas Larke in a Survey of the estate in 1566 describes the circumstances of acquiring Ingatestone:

When Sir William Petre first bought the manor, he repaired thither and found, in the middest part of the demesne lands, the situation of an old house scant meet for a farmer to dwell upon, having about it divers houses of office as well builded as the inner houses were, which, when he had well perused and found the commodity of the ground to be such as he could well like of, then forthwith he caused all those old houses to be pulled down and, in stead of them, hath at his own great costs and charges erected and builded other new houses, very fair, large and stately, made of brick and embattled, and hath besides enclosed all the demesne lands lying round about his house with a fair large pale, parklike.

Unlike both the Treshams of Rushton and the Fitzwilliams of Milton, the Petres had no difficulty in adjusting the scale of their entertainment and hospitality to the family's reduced income after Sir William's retirement from Court. The Petres were safely removed from both the temptations and the gains of the Court, and in every respect, the nature of their estates placed them ideally for profitable survival throughout the period under review. The personality of the family was well suited to taking full advantage of the opportunities open to them.

In his later years, Sir William was said to be Roman Catholic, albeit not involved in the many plots that were laid against Elizabeth, and this is a creed to which his descendants have consistently adhered. His piety was not uncompromising, and did not stand in the way of his temporal advancement. The hall he built at Ingatestone still stands, almost unimpaired, whilst he is buried with his second wife in a chapel adjoining the chancel of St. Edmund and St. Mary's Church, Ingatestone.

== Bequests ==
A considerable portion of Petre's wealth was spent on charitable objects; he founded almshouses at Ingatestone, and endowed scholarships for All Souls' College, Oxford. He was one of the first Governors of King Edward VI Grammar School, Chelmsford. Ascham benefited favour by his favour, which he is said to have requited by dedicating to Petre his 'Osorius de Nobilitate Christiana'.

His chief benefactions were to Exeter College, Oxford (whose rowing eights bear his name to this day), and entitle him to be considered its founder; he rewrote its statutes so its membership was increased. That he retained a warm affection for the college that had given him his early education is evident from the liberal gifts he made. In 1566 he founded seven Scholarships or Fellowships, called the Petrean Fellowships, and the next year founded another to be nominated by him or his heirs from the counties of Devon, Somerset, Dorset, Oxford, Essex, and other counties within the kingdom of England where he had lands and inheritance. For the maintenance of these, he gave four Oxfordshire rectories (which had cost him £1,376) and four parishes (Kidlington, Merton, South Newington and Yarnton) a yearly value of £91 annually. In his will gave a further sum of £40 for the same purpose, to which Lady Petre his widow, and his son and heir John each added another £40. He was a great collector of books, and presented many to Exeter College library. He also obtained for the college new and beneficial Statutes from the Bishop of Exeter, and a Charter from the Queen that the college might be a body politic and corporate. On his portrait, which hangs in Exeter College Hall, is this inscription Octo socios cum terries addidit AD 1566 et multos Libros Bibliothecae contulit. Probably his liberality to Exeter suggested to his daughter Dorothy and her husband, Nicholas Wadham, the founding of the new college of Wadham at Oxford.

== Marriages and issue ==
Petre married twice:

=== First marriage ===
Firstly, in about 1533, he married Gertrude Tyrrell (died 28 May 1541), with whom he had two daughters:

- Dorothy Petre (1534–1618) married Nicholas Wadham (died 1609), founders of Wadham College, Oxford
- Elizabeth Petre, god-daughter of Jane Wriothesley wife of Thomas Wriothesley, 1st Earl of Southampton, who married firstly John Gostwick of Willington, Bedfordshire. They were the grandparents of Sir Edward Gostwick, 2nd Baronet. Elizabeth married secondly Edward Radclyffe, 6th Earl of Sussex as his first wife.

=== Second marriage ===
Petre married secondly, by March 1542, Anne Browne (c.1509 – 10 March 1582), widow of John Tyrrell (died 1540), with whom he had three sons and two daughters:

- John Petre, 1st Baron Petre (1549–1613), who 1570 married Mary Waldegrave (died 2 August 1604).
- Two sons who died young.
- Katherine Petre, who married John Talbot of Grafton, Worcestershire.
- Thomasine Petre, who married Lodovick Greville, son of Sir Edward Greville of Milcote; by him she had a son Sir Edward Greville.

== Notable descendants ==
Mildred Mary Petre known as Mrs Victor Bruce (1895–1990) record-breaking racing motorist, speedboat racer and aviator in the 1920s and 1930s.

== Notes ==
Political offices
Preceded by Sir Thomas Wriothesley; Sir William Paget	Secretary of State; 1544–1557; With: Sir William Paget 1544–1548; Sir Thomas Smith 1548–1549; Nicholas Wotton 1549–1550; Sir William Cecil 1550–1553; Sir John Cheke 1553; Sir John Bourne 1553–1557	Succeeded by John Boxall; Sir John Bourne
Preceded by ?	Custos Rotulorum of Essex bef. 1544–1572	Succeeded by Sir Anthony Cooke
