= Ingatestone Hall =

Country house in Essex, England

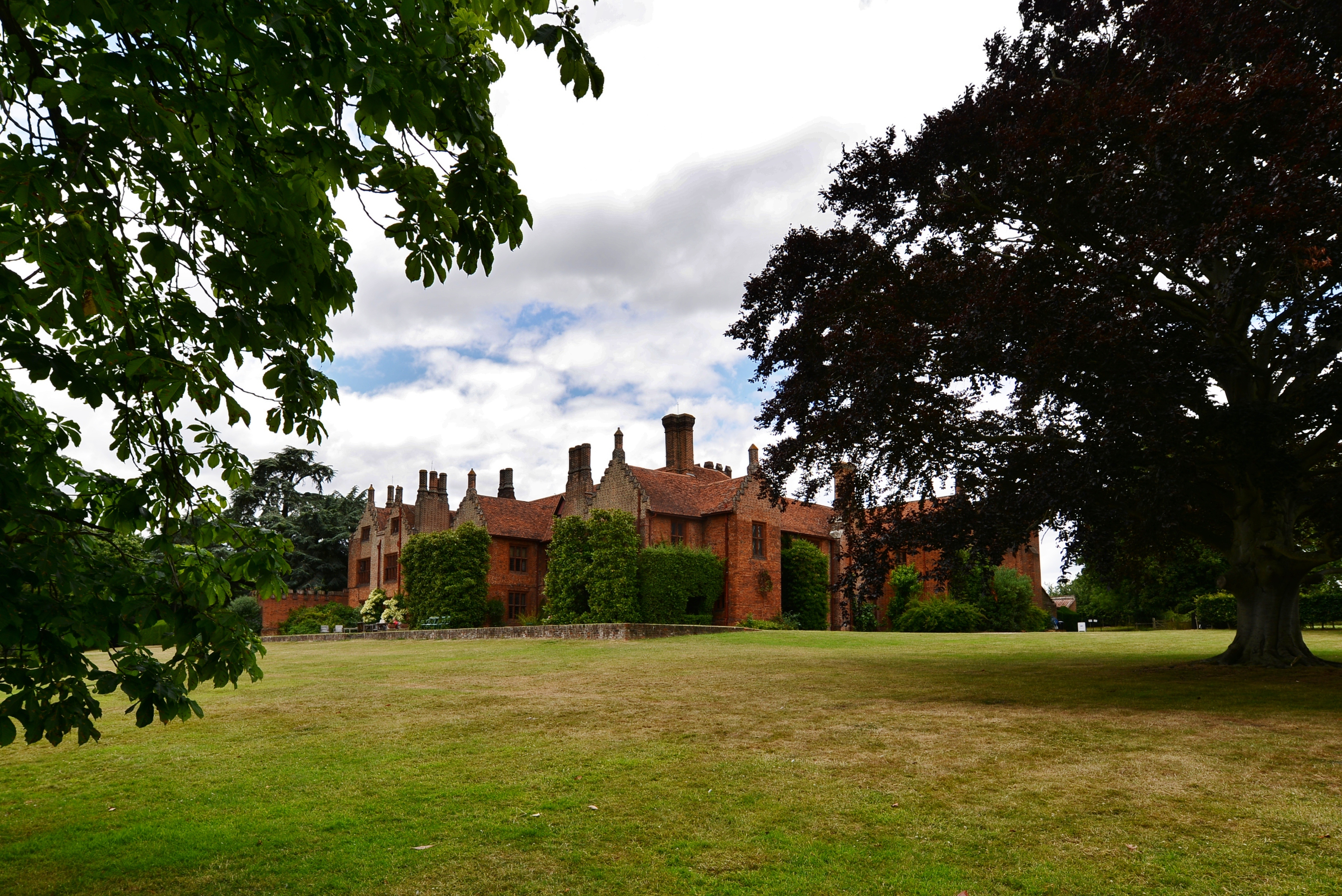
- Ingatestone Hall in 2015

- Location within Essex

General information
- Type: Country House
- Architectural style: Tudor
- Location: Ingatestone, Essex, United Kingdom
- Coordinates: 51°39′41.5″N 0°23′25.3″E
- Construction started: 1539
- Completed: 1556

Technical details
- Material: English bond brickwork

Design and construction
- Designations: Grade I listed

Website
- Official website

Ingatestone Hall is a Grade I listed 16th-century manor house in Essex, England. It is located outside the village of Ingatestone, approximately 5 miles (8.0 km) south west of Chelmsford and 25 miles (40 km) north east of London. The house was built by Sir William Petre, and his descendants (the Barons Petre) live in the house to this day. Part of the house is leased out as offices while the current Lord Petre's son and heir apparent lives in a private wing with his family. The Hall formerly housed Tudor monarchs such as Queen Elizabeth I.

The hall is open to the public on selected afternoons between Easter and September.

== History ==
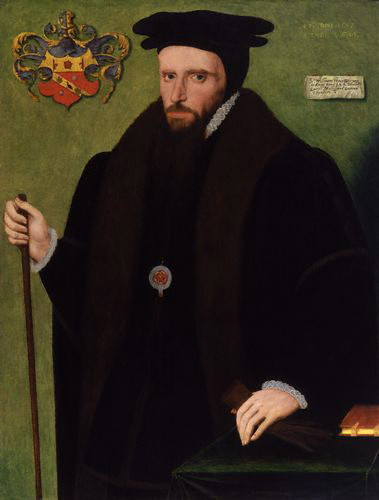
Sir William Petre (c1505-1572)

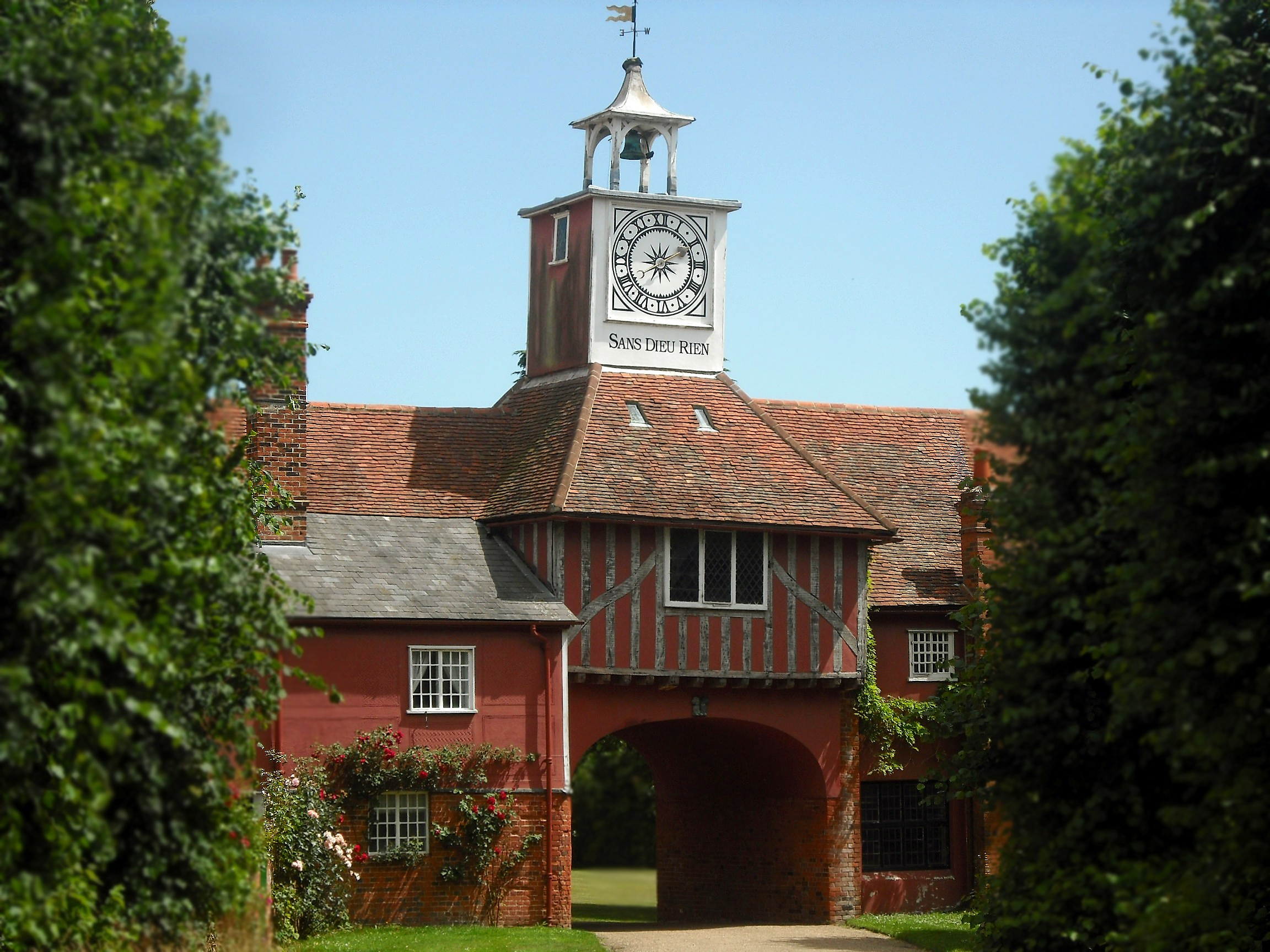
The Gatehouse of Ingatestone Hall

William Petre bought Ingatestone manor soon after the Dissolution of the Monasteries for some £850 and commissioned the building of the house.

In June 1561, Queen Elizabeth I spent several nights at Ingatestone Hall on her royal progress, where she held court. The Petre family laid on a lavish welcome, procuring food and drink and decorating the house.

In November 1564, Lady Katherine Gray was transferred to the charge of Sir William Petre. For two years she was in his custody, and resided at Ingatestone Hall; where she was then removed to the care of Sir John Wentworth (a kinsman of Petre's first wife) at Gosfield Hall.In September 1553, a courtier lent money to William Petre to play at "pass dice" with Mary I of England at Hampton Court.

The Petre family were recusants, remaining loyal to the Roman Catholic Church after the English Reformation had turned the Kingdom of England into a Protestant country. Statutes were passed prohibiting Catholic worship in England, the Book of Common Prayer was established as the official liturgy of the Church of England, and practising Catholics faced severe punishments. Like many noble Catholic families, the Petres worshipped in secret, holding clandestine Catholic Mass in the private family chapel at Ingatestone Hall.

John Petre, 1st Baron Petre, befriended the composer William Byrd, also a Catholic. In 1589–90, Byrd spent Christmas with the family at Ingatestone along with John Petre's half sister Dorothy Petre and her husband Nicholas Wadham later co-founders of Wadham College, Oxford and in 1593 Byrd took up residence in the neighbouring village of Stondon Massey. Byrd supported the Petre family's covert Catholic worship by composing a comprehensive repertory of choral music to be sung in the private chapels at Ingatestone and nearby Thorndon Hall, the other Petre family property. The compositions included two sets of motets called Gradualia (1605 and 1607) and a set of three Mass settings, such as the Mass for Four Voices (1592–3), works first heard at Ingatestone that are now considered to be some of the finest examples of Tudor music.

The Petre family sheltered a number of Catholic priests at Ingatestone, among them was St. John Payne, who was executed in 1582. The hall contains two priest holes that were used for this purpose.

In the late 18th century Robert Petre, 9th Baron Petre moved the family seat to Thorndon Hall and rented Ingatestone Hall out to tenants.

In 1876 much of Thorndon Hall was destroyed by fire. During World War I, Lionel Petre, 16th Baron Petre was killed in action in 1915 and his widow, Lady Rasch, decided to move back to Ingatestone.

During the Second World War, the house was let to Wanstead High School. In the 1950s, Essex County Council used the north wing to house the Essex Record Office and mounted annual exhibitions there until the late 1970s.

In 1952 the hall became grade I listed and the gatehouse grade II* listed, while several of the outhouses became Grade II listed.

Ingatestone Hall houses the remaining Petre family picture collection.

== Architecture ==
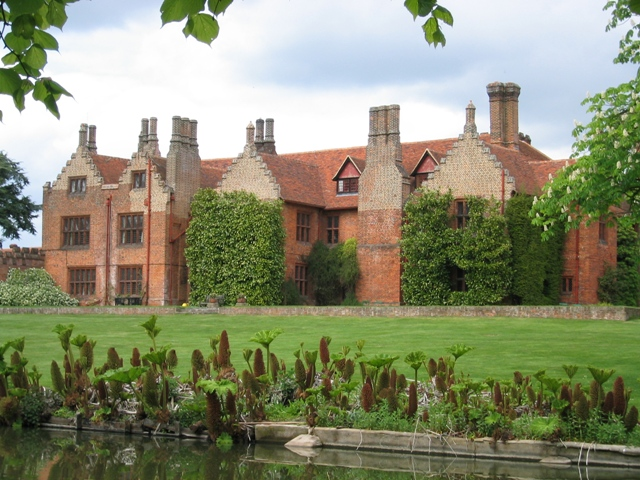
Ingatestone Hall, May 2003

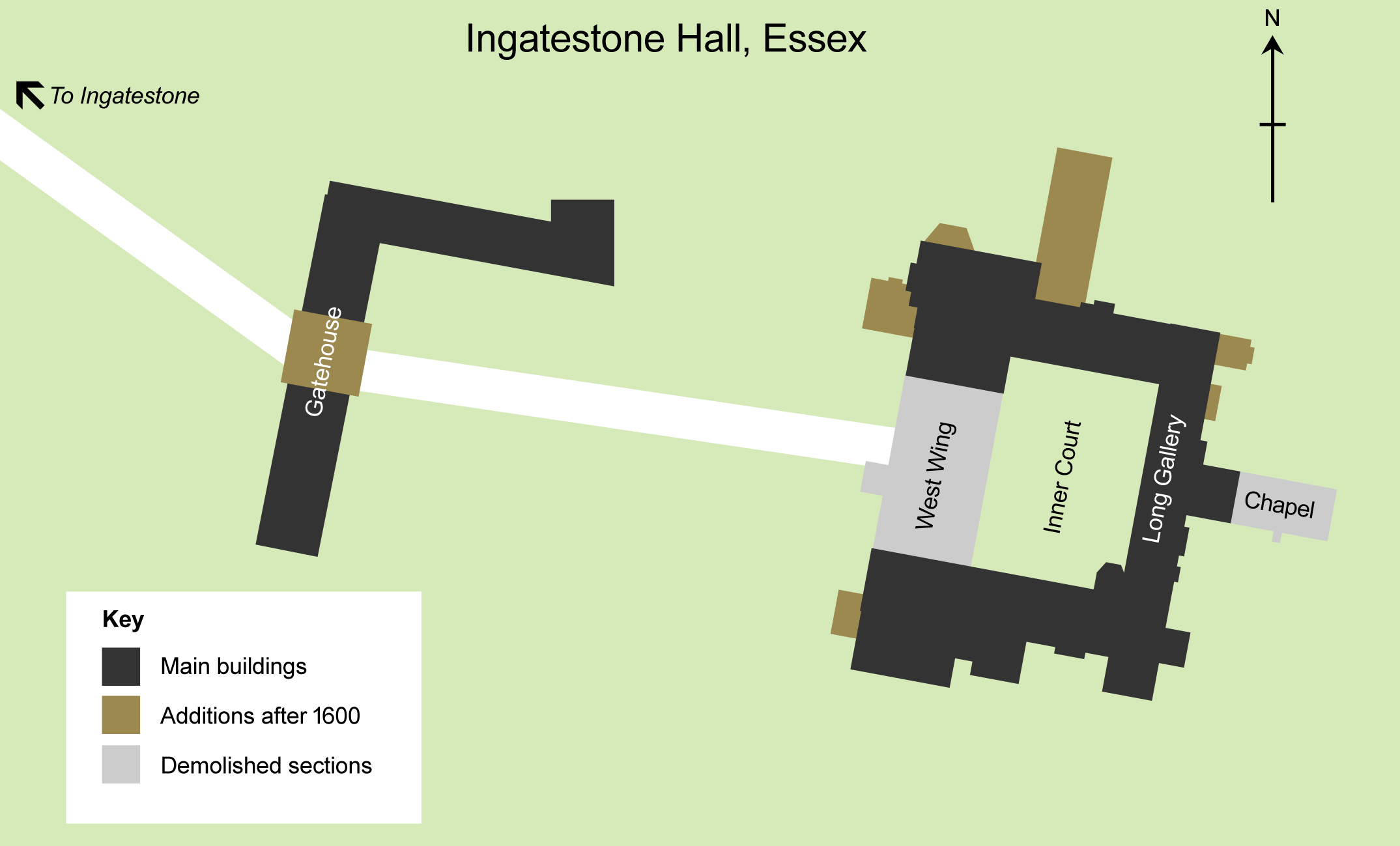
Plan of Ingatestone Hall showing the additions and demolished sections

The building comprises three wings (north, east and south) around a central court. It was built by Sir William Petre 1539–1556 around a central courtyard in English bond brick and includes features typical of Tudor, including stepped gables and tall, ornate chimney pots. Within the courtyard, a prominent feature is a tall crenellated turret containing an octagonal staircase.

In the late 18th century Robert Petre, 9th Baron Petre moved back to the other family property, Thorndon Hall, which was being rebuilt in the Palladian style by the architect James Paine. At around this time, Ingatestone Hall underwent significant alterations and was converted into smaller rented apartments. The west wing, which contained the Great Hall, was demolished, opening the enclosed courtyard out into the U-shaped building that is seen today, and the north wing was extended and the outer court buildings were rebuilt, including an entrance arch topped with a one-handed clock. This clock turret, engraved with the motto "Sans dieu rien" ("without God, nothing") is thought to have been the work of Paine.

The Long Gallery in the east range of the house was the main area of the house. It adjoins the remains of the former family chapel, which was pulled down and rebuilt in 1860. The two priest holes within the building, used during the 16th and 17th centuries to conceal Catholic clergy, are located in the east wing in a void under the turret, and in the south wing behind a chimney stack in the old study.

In the 20th century, when Lady Rasch, widow of the 16th Baron Petre, moved the family back to Ingatestone Hall, she began a major project to restore Ingatestone Hall to its original Tudor appearance. The works, overseen by the architect, W.T. Wood, included replacing alterations to the building with reproductions of Tudor period features, notably the re-instatement of mullioned windows on the west side of the building on the ground floor. The initial phase of project was completed in 1922.

== In literature and film ==
Mary Elizabeth Braddon's 1862 novel Lady Audley's Secret is partly set at Audley Court, which is based on Ingatestone Hall, inspired by a stay there.

The exterior of hall was used as a filming location to represent Bleak House in the 2005 television adaptation of Charles Dickens' novel and also appeared in an episode of the TV series Lovejoy.

== See also ==
- Ingatestone
- John Patrick Lionel Petre, 18th Baron Petre
