= Battle of Sedgemoor =

Monmouth Rebellion battle, Somerset, UK, 1685

Coordinates: 51°06′56″N 2°55′42″W

- Part of the Monmouth Rebellion
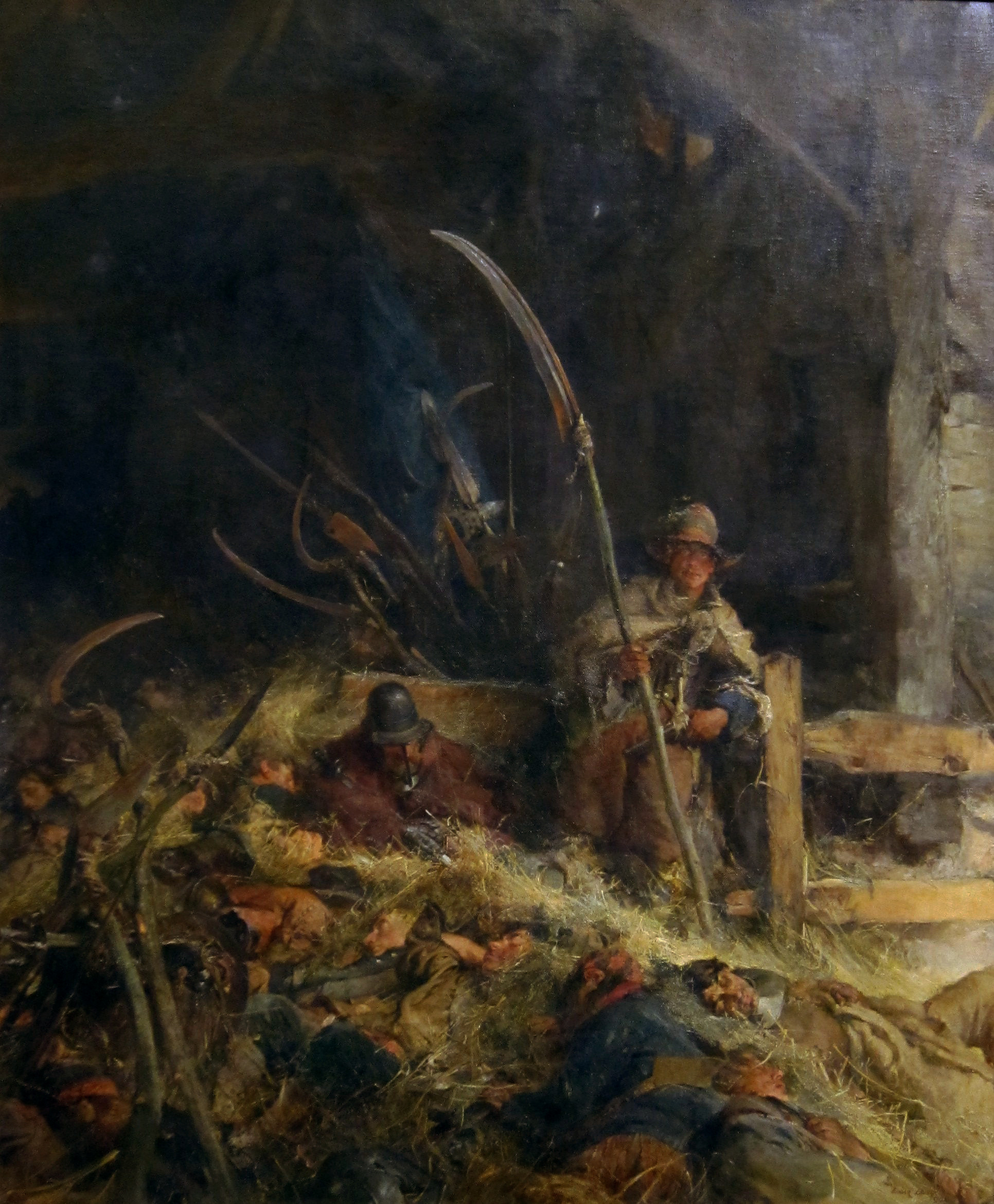
- The Morning of Sedgemoor; Edgar Bundy, 1905
Date	6 July 1685
Location	Westonzoyland, Somerset, England
Result	Royal victory

Belligerents
England	Monmouth Rebels

Commanders and leaders
Louis de Duras; John Churchill; Henry FitzRoy	James Scott; Ford Grey; Nathaniel Wade

Strength
3,000	4,000

Casualties and losses
200 killed or wounded	1,300 killed or wounded 2,700 captured

The Battle of Sedgemoor was the final and decisive engagement of the Monmouth Rebellion, between forces loyal to James II and rebel forces led by the Duke of Monmouth. It was fought on 6 July 1685 at Westonzoyland near Bridgwater in Somerset, England.

The battle followed a series of skirmishes around south-west England between these two forces. King James' forces won the battle, and took about 500 prisoners. Monmouth escaped from the battlefield but was captured, taken to London and executed nine days later. Many of Monmouth's supporters were tried during the Bloody Assizes. Many were transported abroad, while others were executed by drawing and quartering.

== Background ==
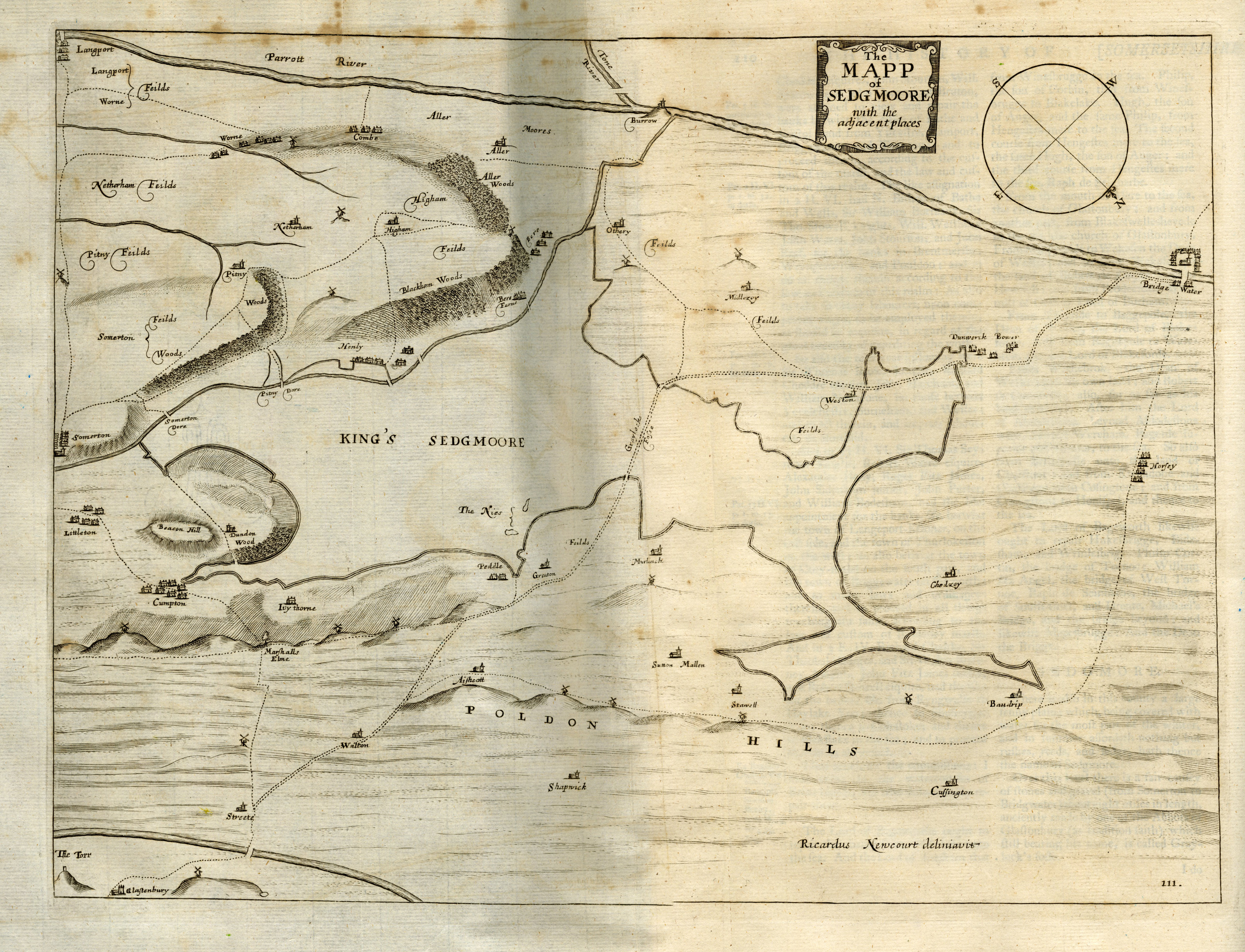
"The Map of Sedgemoor, with adjacent Parts" from "The history of imbanking and drayning" by William Dugdale (1662)

It was the final battle of the Monmouth Rebellion, by which the rebel James Scott, Duke of Monmouth, attempted to seize the English throne from his uncle James II of England. James II had succeeded to the throne on the death of his brother Charles II on 2 February 1685; James Scott was Charles's illegitimate son.

After Monmouth landed from the Dutch Republic at Lyme Regis in Dorset, there had been a series of marches and skirmishes throughout Dorset and Somerset. Eventually Monmouth's poorly equipped army was pushed back to the Somerset Levels, becoming hemmed in at Bridgwater on 3 July. He ordered his troops to fortify the town. The force was made up of around 3,500, mostly nonconformist, artisans and farm workers armed with farm tools (such as pitchforks).

The government troops, led by Louis de Duras, 2nd Earl of Feversham, and Colonel John Churchill, were camped behind the Bussex Rhine at Westonzoyland on Sedgemoor. The infantry included:

- 500 men of the 1st Regiment of Foot (the Royal Scots), known as Dumbarton's Regiment, under Lieutenant-Colonel Douglas;
- two battalions of the 1st or King's Royal Regiment of Guards (Grenadier Guards), respectively led by Henry FitzRoy, 1st Duke of Grafton, and Major Eaton;
- 600 men of the Second Regiment of Guards (later the Coldstream Guards) under Lieutenant-Colonel Sackville;
- five companies of the Queen Dowager's or the Tangier Regiment (later 2nd Foot), known as "Kirke's Lambs"; and
- five companies of the Queen Consort's Regiment (Kings Own Royal Regiment), also known as Trelawny's Regiment, which was commanded by Lieutenant-Colonel Charles Churchill, Colonel John Churchill's younger brother.

In addition there were:

- The Horse and Foot, the Royal Train of Artillery was camped along the road to Bridgwater.
- The Royal Cavalry, with seven troops of 420 men of the Earl of Oxford's,
- The Kings Regiment of Horse (Blues and Royals), led by Colonel Sir Francis Compton
- The King's Own Royal Dragoons;
- Three troops of the King's Horse Guards (Lifeguards).

== Government forces ==
The government forces included the following regiments:

- Royal Regiment of Horse, commanded by Lieutenant General Aubrey de Vere, 20th Earl of Oxford KG
- Queen's Regiment of Horse, commanded by Lieutenant General Sir John Lanier
- King's Own Royal Regiment of Dragoons, commanded by General John Churchill
- 1st Regiment of Foot Guards, commanded by Brigadier General Henry Fitzroy, 1st Duke of Grafton KG
- 1st Battalion, Earl of Dumbarton's Regiment of Foot, commanded by Lieutenant General Lord George Douglas, 1st Earl of Dumbarton KT

== Battle ==
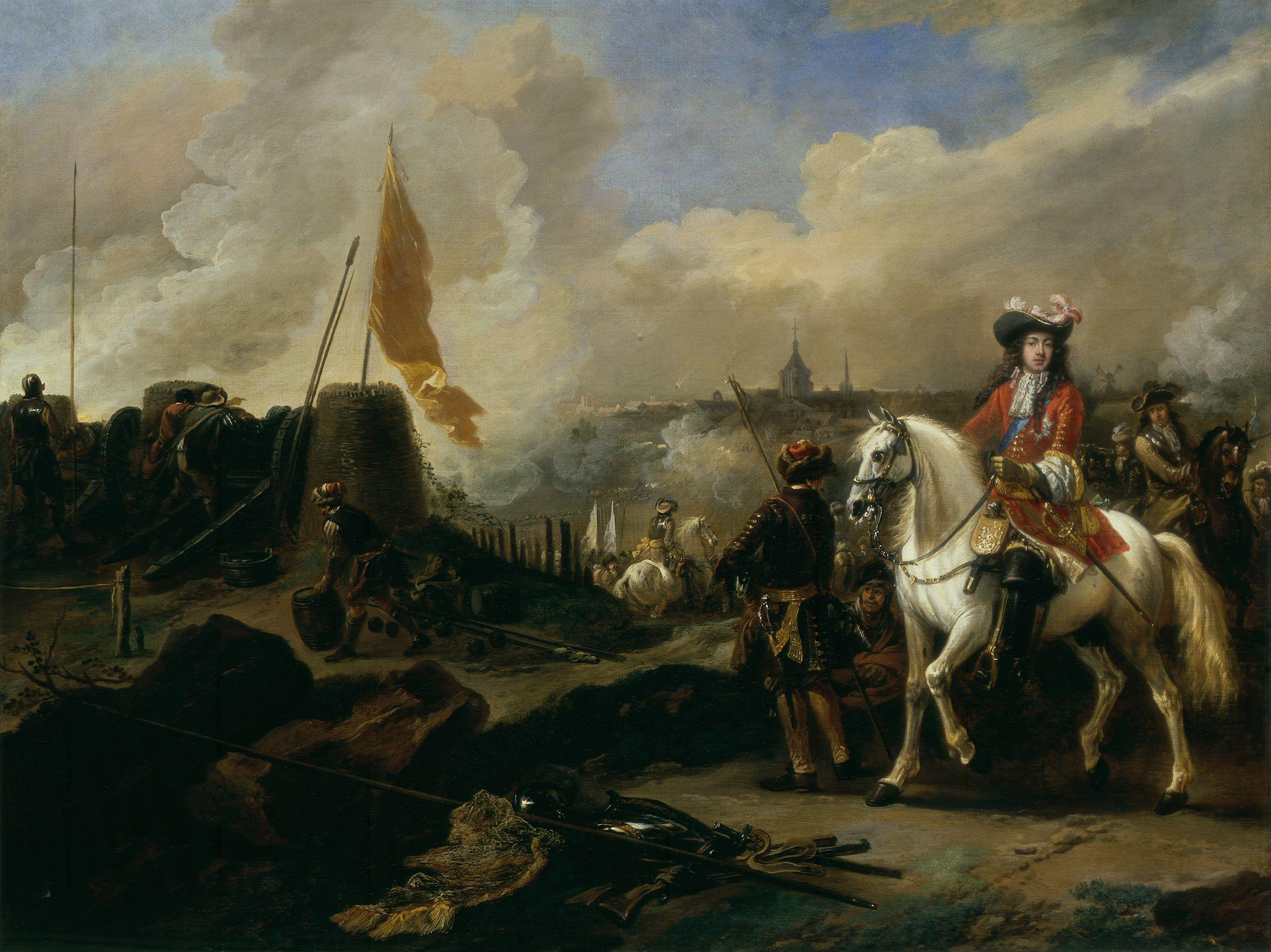
James Scott, the rebel commander

The Duke eventually led his troops out of Bridgwater at around 10:00 pm to undertake a night-time attack on the King's army. They were guided by Richard Godfrey, the servant of a local farmer, along the old Bristol road towards Bawdrip. With their limited cavalry in the vanguard, they turned south along Bradney Lane and Marsh Lane, and came to the open moor with its deep and dangerous rhynes.

There was a delay while the rhyne was crossed and the first men across startled a government patrol. A shot was fired and a horseman from the patrol galloped off to report to Feversham. Lord Grey of Warke led the rebel cavalry forward and they were engaged by the King's Regiment of Horse which alerted the rest of the government forces. The superior training of the regular army and their horses enabled them to rout the rebel forces by outflanking them.

== Aftermath ==
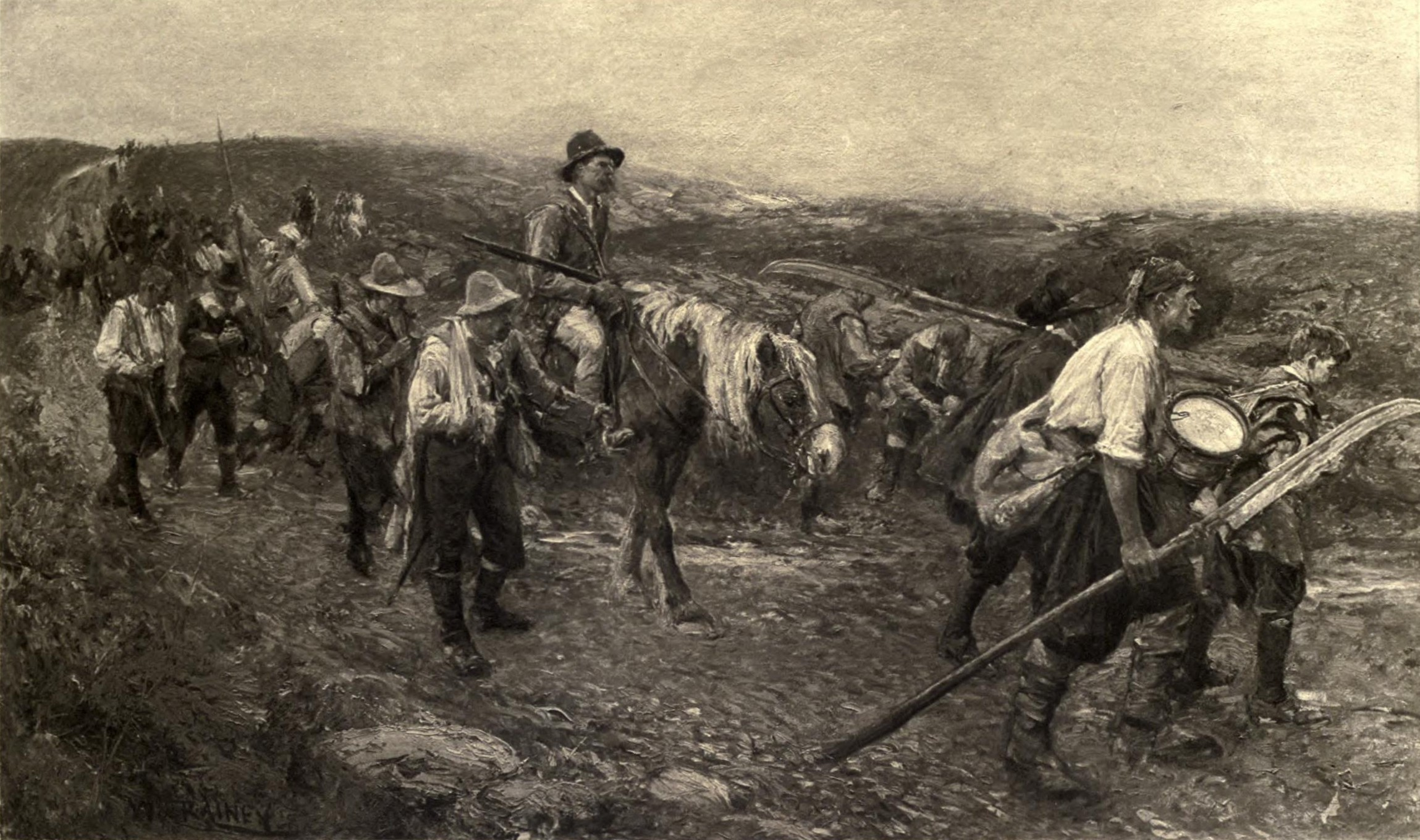
After Sedgemoor

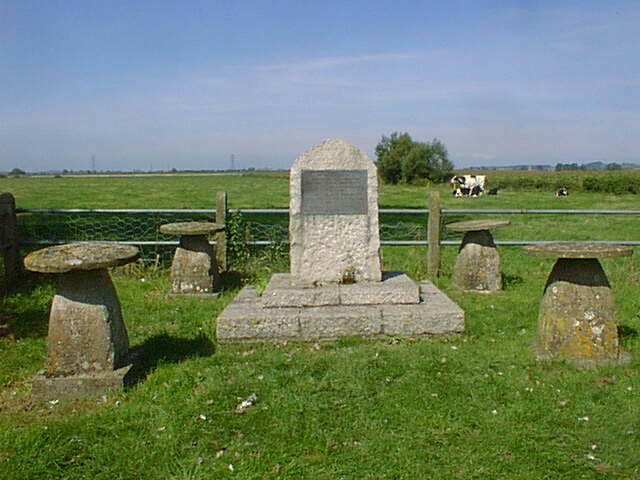
A memorial to the battle

Monmouth escaped from the battlefield with Grey and they headed for the south coast disguised as peasants. They were captured near Ringwood, Hampshire. Monmouth was taken to the Tower of London, where he was, after several blows of the axe, beheaded.

A letter written by the Earl of Shaftesbury in 1787 provides more detail as to Monmouth's capture:

The tradition of the neighbourhood is this: viz. That after the defeat of the Duke of Monmouth at Sedgemoor, near Bridgwater, he rode, accompanied by Lord Grey, to Woodyates, where they quitted their horses; and the Duke having changed clothes with a peasant, endeavoured to make his way across the country to Christchurch. Being closely pursued, he made for the Island, and concealed himself in a ditch which was overgrown with fern and underwood. When his pursuers came up, an old woman gave information of his being in the Island, and of her having seen him filling his pocket with peas. The Island was immediately surrounded by soldiers, who passed the night there, and threatened to fire the neighbouring cotts. As they were going away, one of them espied the skirt of the Duke's coat, and seized him. The soldier no sooner knew him, than he burst into tears, and reproached himself for the unhappy discovery. The Duke when taken was quite exhausted with fatigue and hunger, having had no food since the battle but the peas which he had gathered in the field. The ash tree is still standing under which the Duke was apprehended, and is marked with the initials of many of his friends who afterwards visited the spot.

The family of the woman who betrayed him were ever after holden in the greatest detestation, and are said to have fallen into decay, and to have never thriven afterwards. The house where she lived, which overlooked the spot, has since fallen down. It was with the greatest difficulty that any one could be made to inhabit it.

After the battle, about 500 of Monmouth's troops were captured and imprisoned in the Church of St Mary the Virgin, Westonzoyland, while others were hunted and shot in the ditches where they were hiding. More were hanged from gibbets erected along the roadside. The royalist troops were rewarded, with Feversham being made a Knight of the Garter, Churchill promoted to major-general and Henry Shires of the artillery receiving a knighthood. Other soldiers, particularly those who had been wounded, received allowances ranging from £5 to £80. Some of the wounded were among the first to be treated at the newly opened Royal Hospital Chelsea.

The king sent Lord Chief Justice Jeffreys to round up the Duke's supporters throughout the south-west and try them in the Bloody Assizes at Taunton Castle and elsewhere. About 1,300 people were found guilty, many being transported abroad, while some were executed by drawing and quartering. Daniel Defoe, who would later write the novel Robinson Crusoe, had taken part in the uprising and battle. He was heavily fined by Jeffreys, losing much of his land and wealth. Two brothers Benjamin Hewling, a commander of a troop of horse, and William Hewling, lieutenant of foot, were among those condemned to death. Benjamin Hewling was hanged rather than drawn and quartered following a payment of £1000 by his sister.

James II was overthrown in a coup d'état three years later, in the Glorious Revolution.

== Last battle on English soil ==
The Battle of Sedgemoor is often referred to as the last pitched battle fought on English soil, but this depends on the definition of 'battle', for which there are different interpretations. Other contenders for the title of last English battle include: the Battle of Preston in Lancashire, which was fought on 14 November 1715, during the First Jacobite Rebellion; and the Second Jacobite Rebellion's Clifton Moor Skirmish, near Penrith, Cumberland, on 18 December 1745. The Battle of Culloden, fought on Drumossie Moor to the north-east of Inverness on 16 April 1746, was the last pitched battle fought on British soil.

== Cultural references ==
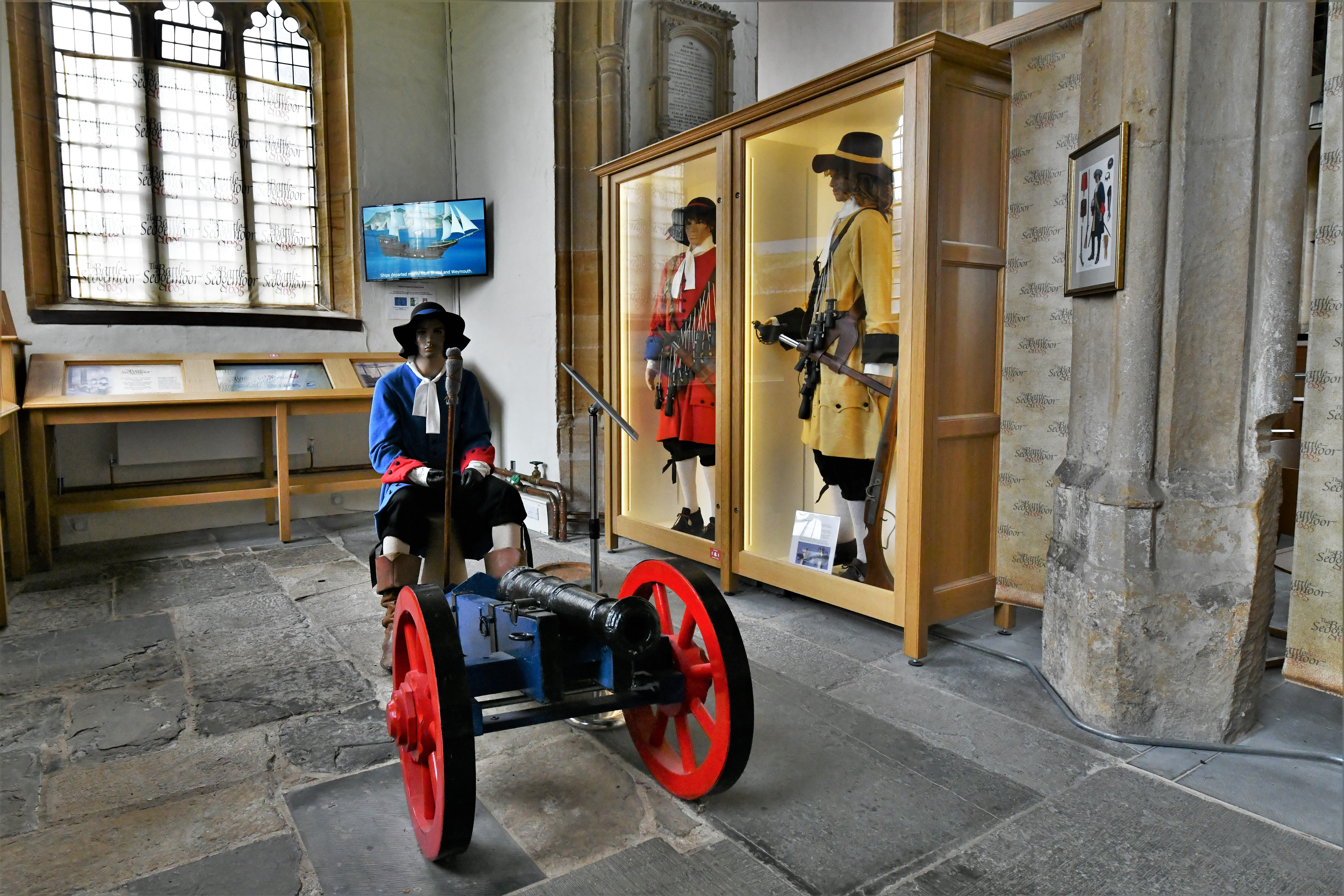
Display in the Westonzoyland Church

=== Literature ===
- The Battle of Sedgemoor is depicted in detail at the climax of Arthur Conan Doyle's historical adventure novel Micah Clarke.
- The battle also appears in Blackmore's Lorna Doone, where the hero arrives on the battlefield as the battle is finishing, and is then escorted home to safety by the king's soldiers.
- Likewise, The Royal Changeling (1998) by John Whitbourn describes the rebellion, with some fantasy elements added. The Battle of Sedgemoor both opens and concludes the novel.
- A collection of poems (Sedgemoor), exploring the battle and consequences of the rebellion, was written by poet and academic Malcolm Povey and published by Smokestack Books in 2006. The poems move between 1685 and the present day, as a narrative technique. Povey's book received praise, especially for its originality: "Not many poets try something as different and ambitious as this. It deserves to be widely read."
- Events surrounding the battle occupy the first few chapters of Rafael Sabatini's novel Captain Blood. The battle is also mentioned in the beginning of the 1935 movie Captain Blood.

=== Other portrayals ===
- The Sealed Knot re-enactment society have re-enacted important parts of the rebellion's campaign, on the 300th anniversary in 1985, and again in 2005. For the first re-enactment, the folk trio Strawhead produced an album of various songs from the time and written especially, entitled Sedgemoor.
- The Battle of Sedgemoor was also a central plot element in the 1972 HTV series Pretenders, which was broadcast in 13 half-hour episodes.
- A mural depicting the battle is on display at Sedgemoor motorway services on the North carriageway of the M5 motorway.
