= Lord James Beauclerk =

British Anglican clergyman

The Right Reverend Lord James Beauclerk
- Bishop of Hereford
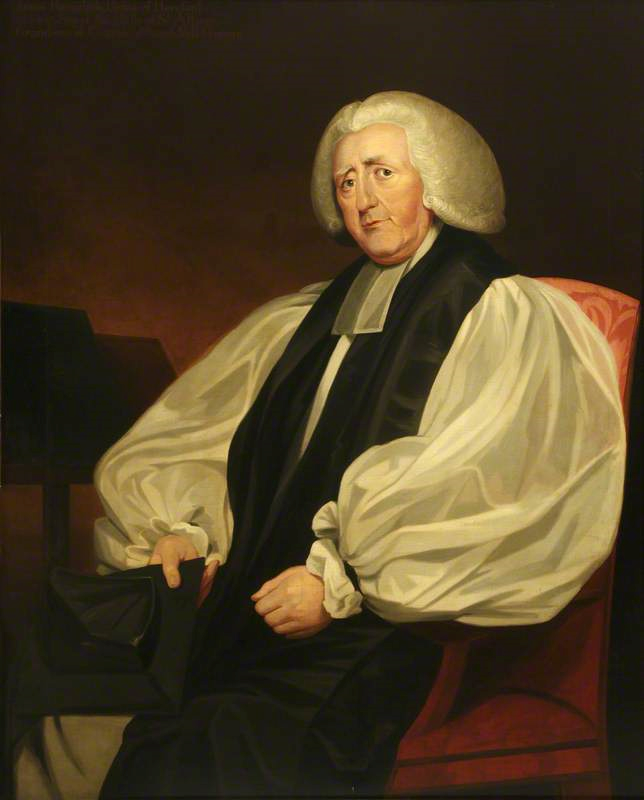
- Church: Church of England
- Diocese: Diocese of Hereford
- In office: 1746–1787
- Predecessor: Henry Egerton
- Successor: John Harley

Personal details
- Born: c. 1709
- Died: 20 October 1787
- Denomination: Anglican
- Parents: Charles Beauclerk, 1st Duke of St Albans; Lady Diana de Vere
- Education: Abingdon School; The Queen's College, Oxford

Styles of Lord James Beauclerk
- Reference style: The Right Reverend
- Spoken style: My Lord
- Religious style: Bishop

Lord James Beauclerk (c. 1709 – 20 October 1787) was an Anglican clergyman who served as the Bishop of Hereford from 1746 to 1787.

== Education ==
He was the eighth son of Charles Beauclerk, 1st Duke of St Albans and Lady Diana de Vere. He was educated John Roysse's Free School in Abingdon (now Abingdon School) and later at The Queen's College, Oxford, graduating B.A., 1730, M.A., 1733, B.D. and D.D. by diploma, 2 July 1744.

== Career ==
He was Deputy Clerk of the Closet from 1745 to 1746.

James was a canon of St George's Chapel, Windsor when he was nominated bishop of the Diocese of Hereford on 8 April 1746. His consecration took place on 11 May 1746.

He was a Steward of the OA Club in 1745. He died unmarried on 20 October 1787, aged about 78.

== Ancestry ==
Ancestors of Lord James Beauclerk

16. James I of England
8. Charles I of England
17. Anne of Denmark
4. Charles II of England
18. Henry IV of France
9. Henrietta Maria of France
19. Marie de' Medici
2. Charles Beauclerk, 1st Duke of St Albans
10. Thomas Gwyn
5. Nell Gwyn
11. Ellen
1. Lord James Beauclerk
24. Hugh de Vere
12. Robert de Vere, 19th Earl of Oxford
25. Eleanor Walsh
6. Aubrey de Vere, 20th Earl of Oxford
13. Beatrix van Hemmend
3. Lady Diana de Vere
14. George Kirke
7. Diana Kirke
30. Aurelian Townshend
15. Mary Townshend

== See also ==
- List of Old Abingdonians

Church of England titles
Preceded by Henry Egerton	Bishop of Hereford; 1746–1787	Succeeded by John Harley
