= General Lumley =

General Lumley may refer to:

- Aldred Lumley, 10th Earl of Scarbrough (1857–1945), British Army major general
- Henry Lumley (c. 1658–1722), British Army general
- Roger Lumley, 11th Earl of Scarbrough (1896–1969), British Army major general
- William Lumley (1769–1850), British Army general
