= Diana Beauclerk, Duchess of St Albans =

British courtier

Her Grace The Duchess of St Albans
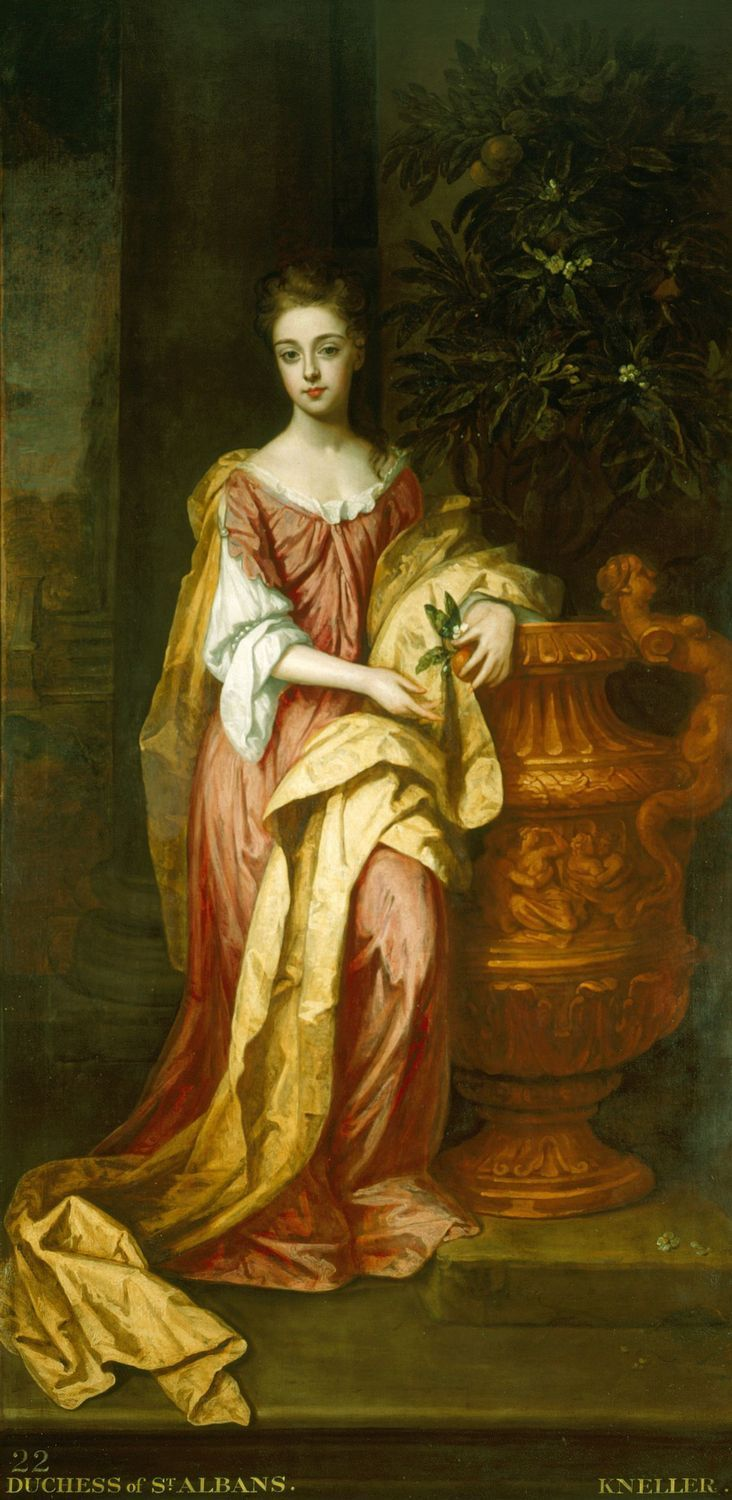
- Portrait by Sir Godfrey Kneller, 1691
- Born: Lady Diana de Vere c. 1679
- Died: 15 January 1742; Windsor Castle, Windsor, England
- Noble family: de Vere (by birth); Beauclerk (by marriage)
- Spouse: Charles Beauclerk, 1st Duke of St Albans (m. 1694; died 1726)
- Issue: Charles Beauclerk, 2nd Duke of St Albans; Lady Diana Beauclerk; Lord William Beauclerk; Vere Beauclerk, 1st Baron Vere; Lord Henry Beauclerk; Lord Sidney Beauclerk; Lord George Beauclerk; Lord Seymour Beauclerk; Lord James Beauclerk; Lord Aubrey Beauclerk; Lady Mary Beauclerk; Lady Anne Beauclerk
- Father: Aubrey de Vere, 20th Earl of Oxford
- Mother: Diana Kirke
- Occupation: First Lady of the Bedchamber to Caroline of Ansbach

Diana Beauclerk, Duchess of St Albans (born Lady Diana de Vere; c. 1679 – 15 January 1742) was a British courtier. She was Mistress of the Robes to Caroline, Princess of Wales from 1714 to 1717. She was also one of the Hampton Court Beauties of Mary II.

== Life ==
Diana was the eldest daughter of Aubrey de Vere, 20th Earl of Oxford, and his second wife Diana Kirke. She also had two sisters, Mary and Henrietta, and through her father's relationship with Hester Davenport she also had an illegitimate half-brother named Aubrey de Vere.

Since her father was a Gentleman of the Bedchamber and later a Privy Councillor, the family lived at Whitehall. Diana's mother, the Countess of Oxford, had a reputation for taking lovers and was said to have been intimately involved with Prince Rupert and the 1st Earl of St Albans.

== Marriage ==
On 17 April 1694, she married Charles Beauclerk, 1st Duke of St Albans, an illegitimate son of King Charles II and his mistress Nell Gwyn, whereupon Diana became Duchess of St Albans.

Although she was the heiress of the last Earl of Oxford, Diana did not inherit much in monetary means from her father and is thought to have brought a very small dowry or no dowry to the marriage.

The marriage appears to have been a successful one and Beauclerk and Diana would go on to have 12 children together.

Beauclerk was however not always a faithful husband and kept as his mistress the courtesan Sally Salisbury.

== Lady of the Bedchamber ==
Diana had been a lady-in-waiting and a favourite of Mary II, who included her among the portrait series known as "The Hampton Court Beauties".

During the reign of Queen Anne neither Diana nor her husband were much favoured as Anne, Beauclerk's cousin, did not care much for the illegitimate children of her uncle and regarded the sons with suspicion and as potential usurpers. Furthermore, Beauclerk's Whig views prevented he and his wife’s advancement, but they were restored to favour at the accession of King George I in 1714.

Subsequently Diana became the first lady of the bedchamber and Groom of the Stool to George I's daughter-in-law Caroline of Ansbach. In 1714 Diana tried to have her maternal grandmother Mary Kirke considered for the position of "bedchamber woman" but nothing came of it perhaps due to her bad reputation.

Even if her grandmother's behavior was considered questionable, Diana herself seems to have been considered blameless as she stood as godmother for the royal couple's son, the short- lived George William. She was chosen by King George I over the parents' wishes.

She resigned from the position of Lady of the bedchamber in 1717, that same year. This owed to the quarrel between George I and his son; the king made it clear that the members of the court could either choose to be loyal to him or to his son. Diana, whose husband was in service to the king, therefore had to resign so her husband could keep his position.

She was succeeded by the Duchess of Dorset. It seems, however, that Diana tried to regain her position in 1720 after the reconciliation of the king and his son.

Diana's husband died in 1723 and thereafter she was styled as the Dowager Duchess of St. Albans. In 1725 her sister Mary also died and left her what remained of the de Vere inheritance.

She attended the funeral of Caroline of Ansbach in 1737 at Westminster Abbey and carried the train of Princess Amelia alongside the Duchess of Montagu.

== Issue ==
- Charles Beauclerk, 2nd Duke of St Albans (6 April 1696 – 27 July 1751)
- Lady Diana Beauclerk (born c. 1697 - 1743)
- Lord William Beauclerk (22 May 1698 – 23 February 1732/33)
- Admiral Vere Beauclerk, 1st Baron Vere of Hanworth (14 July 1699 – 21 October 1781)
- Colonel Lord Henry Beauclerk (11 August 1701 – 5 January 1761)
- Lord Sidney Beauclerk (27 February 1703 – 23 November 1744)
- Lieutenant-General Lord George Beauclerk (26 December 1704 – 11 May 1768)
- Lord Seymour Beauclerk (born 24 June 1708)
- Rt. Revd. Lord James Beauclerk (c. 1709 – 20 October 1787), Bishop of Hereford
- Lord Aubrey Beauclerk (1711 – 24 February 1740)
- Lady Mary Beauclerk (born c. 1713)
- Lady Anne Beauclerk (born c. 1716)

== Death ==
Towards the end of her life Diana suffered from illness which kept her housebound.

Diana died on the 15th of January 1742 at Burford House.

That great and good lady, the late Duchess of St. Alban's, whose memory will be ever precious among us, sweet as honey in the mouths of all that speak of her, and as music at a banquet of wine in the ears of all that hear of her . . . so bright an example, and so eminent a pattern of piety and good works . . . Of this Duchess Fame speaks highly. She was charitable to the utmost of her abilities. She searched for objects on whom she might bestow her fortune. She supported a dignity worthy of her high birth; yet was of so condescending, so affable, and so courteous a disposition, that she engaged and won the hearts of all who were admitted into her presence. Of her beauty little need be said. View the portraits of her at Hampton-Court and other places

== Depictions in culture ==
Diana is the protagonist of the novel "A Pledge of Better Times" (2015) by Margaret Porter.

Court offices
Preceded by —	Mistress of the Robes to Caroline, Princess of Wales; 1714–1717	Succeeded by Elizabeth Sackville, Duchess of Dorset
