= Roxalana =

Roxalana may refer to:

- Hurrem Sultan (c.1502-1558), the chief consort and legal wife of the Ottoman Sultan Suleiman the Magnificent
- Hester Davenport (1642-1717), English actress who used Roxalana as her stage name
