= Love and Honor =

Love and Hono(u)r may refer to:

- Love and Honour (play), a 1634 play by the English poet and playwright William Davenant
- Love and Honor (2006 film), a Japanese film
- Love and Honor (2013 film), an American romantic drama film
- Love and Honor (album), a 1994 album by Ricky Van Shelton

== See also ==
- For Love and Honor, a 2007 Turkish drama film
- Love, Honor, and Oh Baby!, a 1933 American film, remade in 1940
