= Lord Aubrey Beauclerk =

Royal Navy officer

Captain Lord Aubrey Beauclerk
- Born: c. 1710
- Died: 22 March 1741
- Relatives: Charles Beauclerk, 1st Duke of St Albans (father)
- Military career
- Allegiance: Great Britain
- Branch: Royal Navy
- Service years: – 1741
- Rank: Post captain
- Commands: HMS Ludlow Castle; HMS Garland; HMS Dolphin; HMS Weymouth; HMS Prince Frederick
- Conflicts: War of the Austrian Succession; Battle of Cartagena de Indias

Lord Aubrey Beauclerk (c. 1710 – 22 March 1741) was an officer of the Royal Navy. He saw service during the War of the Austrian Succession and was killed at the Battle of Cartagena de Indias.

== Early naval service ==
Lord Aubrey was born circa 1710, the eighth son of Charles Beauclerk, 1st Duke of St Albans by his wife Diana. After some previous service he was made post-captain on 1 April 1731, and appointed to HMS Ludlow Castle, which ship he commanded on the Leeward Islands station for about eighteen months. Through the years 1734-5 he commanded HMS Garland in the Mediterranean, and in 1737-9 HMS Dolphin on the same station. He returned home in January 1740, and was almost immediately appointed to the 60-gun HMS Weymouth, from which, in the course of the summer, he was transferred to the 70-gun HMS Prince Frederick, one of the fleet which sailed for the West Indies with Sir Chaloner Ogle on 26 October 1740.

== War of the Austrian Succession ==
On the afternoon of one of the first days in January 1741, as the fleet was off the west end of Hispaniola, four large ships were sighted. The admiral signalled the Prince Frederick and five other ships of the line to chase. Towards dusk, the strangers hoisted French colours but did not shorten sail, and they were not overtaken till nearly ten o'clock. The Prince Frederick was the headmost ship, and Lord Aubrey hailed the ship he came up with, desiring her to heave to. As she neither did so nor answered his hail, he fired a shot across her bows; she replied with a broadside, and as the other ships came up a smart interchange of firing took place, after which they lay by till daylight. Their nationality was then apparent; they were really French ships, and the two squadrons parted with mutual apologies. The affair passed as a mistake and probably was so on the part of the English. The fleet, under Sir Chaloner Ogle, arrived at Jamaica on 7 January and joined Vice-Admiral Edward Vernon, under whose command it proceeded to Cartagena on the Spanish Main.

There, in the attack on the Boca Chica during the Battle of Cartagena de Indias, Lord Aubrey was killed on 22 March 1741. A handsome monument to his memory was erected in Westminster Abbey, designed by Peter Scheemakers. A pension of £200 per annum was conferred on his widow, which she enjoyed until her death on 30 October 1755. (Note: Charnock's Biography. Nav. iv. 221) (Note: Beatson's Naval and Military Memoirs, i. 69) (Note: Oflicial Letters, &c. in the Public Record Office.)
