= Bussex Rhine =

Large open ditch or drain in Somerset, England

Coordinates: 51.1151°N 2.9223°W

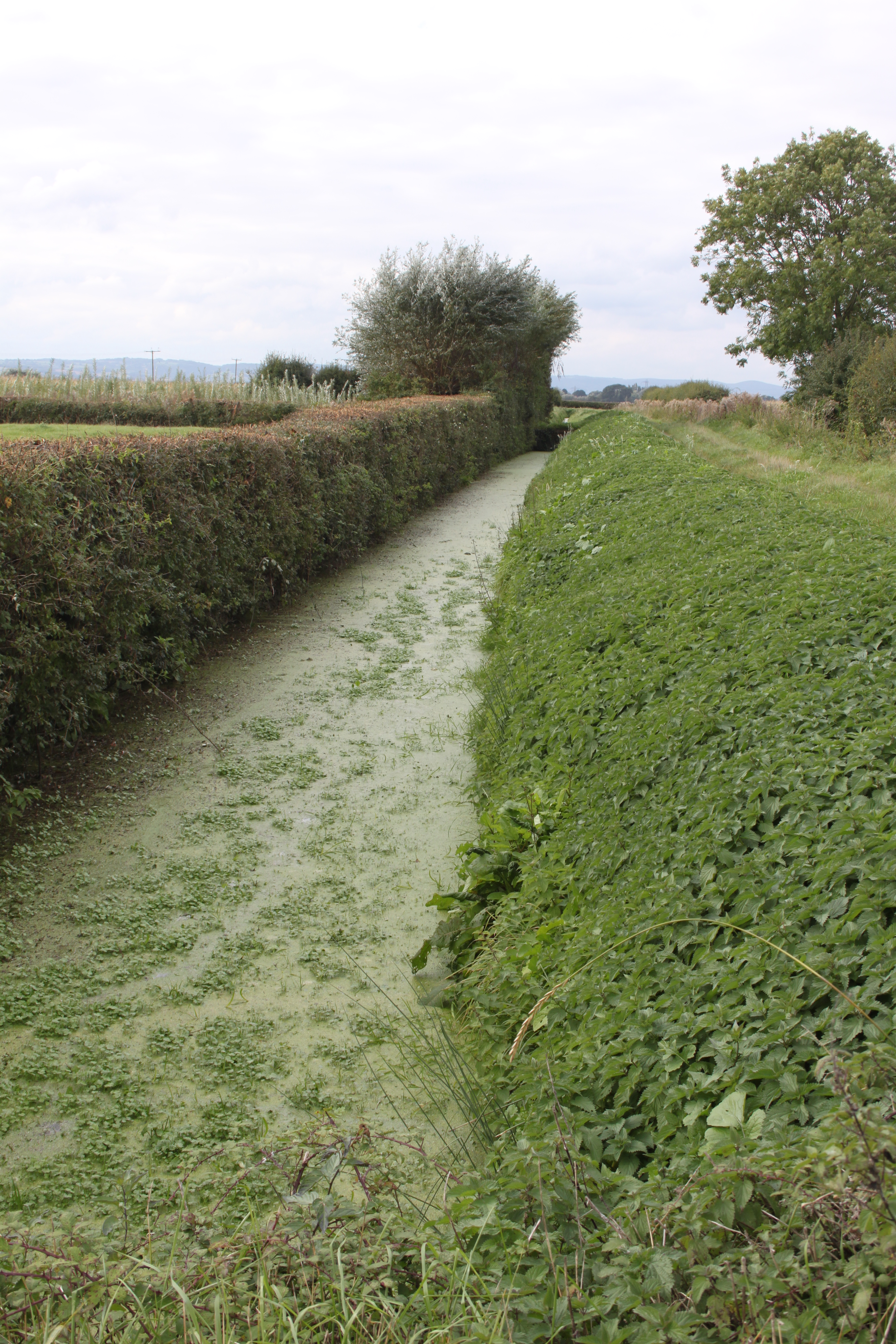
Bussex Rhine

The Bussex Rhine was a rhyne, or sizeable ditch, running outside the village of Westonzoyland in Somerset, England. A rhyne or rhine (rhymes with ‘seen’) is a southern English dialect word for a "large open ditch or drain". In the 17th century many rhines were used in Somerset to drain marshy ground.

During the 1685 Monmouth Rebellion the king's forces were camped at the rhyne. The rebels under the Duke of Monmouth attempted a surprise night attack but were fatally delayed by the difficulty of crossing the rhyne. With the element of surprise lost the better-trained royal forces, ably commanded by John Churchill and armed with cannon, cut the rebels to pieces at what became known as the Battle of Sedgemoor.
