= Love and Honour (play) =

Restoration tragicomedy play by William Davenant

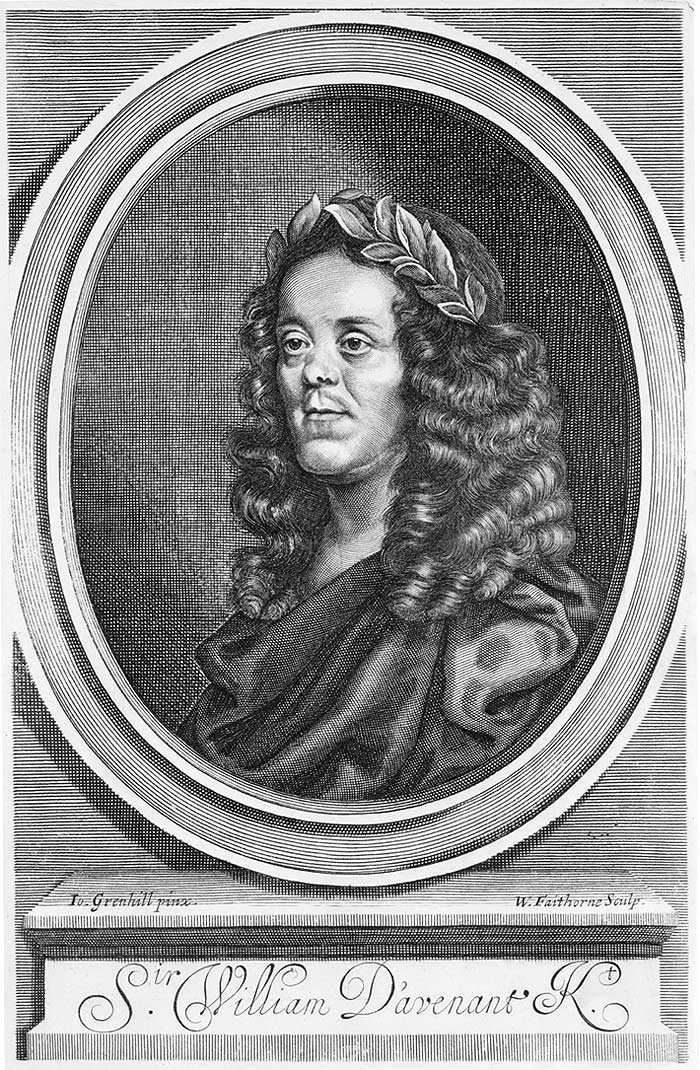
Sir William Davenant, author of Love and Honour

Love and Honour is a Restoration tragicomedy by English Renaissance theatre playwright Sir William Davenant which was produced at his playhouse Lisle's Tennis Court in Lincoln's Inn Fields in London for a 12-day run in October 1661 and which featured Thomas Betterton as Prince Alvaro and Hester Davenport as Evandra.

The work had previously been performed in 1633 as The Courage of Love (licensed 20 November 1634) by the King's Men at Blackfriars Theatre and had been renamed The Nonpareilles, or The Matchless Maids (printed 1649) by Sir Henry Herbert, Master of the Revels, at Davenant's request, who was unhappy with the original title. Popular in its day, The Nonpareilles was revived by order of Queen Henrietta Maria, consort of Charles I, in a performance at Hampton Court during the plague of 1636-37 when the theatres were closed.

The play, in which one woman is willing to sacrifice herself to save a close female friend, was described as resembling the works of Shakespeare and, while set in Savoy, had no historical basis. The work concerned the fictional Duke of Savoy and his son Prince Alvaro (the latter played by Thomas Betterton), who in the role was resplendent in the suit worn by Charles II at his Coronation earlier that year. Henry Harris played Prince Prospero and wore the Coronation suit of the James, Duke of York, while Joseph Price, who played Leonell, son of the Duke of Parma, wore a suit provided by the Earl of Oxford.

Samuel Pepys in his famous Diary recorded seeing Love and Honour three times in four days in October 1661, observing on the latter visit "and a very good play it is". The diarist John Evelyn also attended a performance.

== Synopsis ==
During an Italian war, Evandra, the daughter of the Duke of Milan, is captured by Altesto, a soldier in the forces of Prospero, who has her imprisoned in his house. The Duke of Savoy wishes to execute her in revenge for the death of his brother in battle against the Duke of Milan ten years before. Unbeknown to him, his brother is still alive having been captured by the Duke of Milan who holds him as a guest to prevent further wars.

Alvaro, son of the Duke of Savoy, has a love for Evandra that is so strong that he can "march strong, through hideous gulfs, through numerous herds of angry lions". Alvaro orders his friend Prospero to hide Evandra in a cave at his house to protect her from the Duke, his father. Prospero comes to love her. In Prospero's house she finds a companion in Melora, the sister of Leonell; both are the children of the Duke of Parma and also are captives. Leonell also comes to love her. While the three men contest between themselves as to who will die for her (she has a price on her head), she locks two of her suitors in a cave and convinces the third, Leonell, to guard them while she hands herself in to the authorities. This causes a love/honour conflict for Leonell, who must decide whether to stay and guard his rivals or follow the object of his love. In the end honour triumphs and he stays on guard until Evandra has left.

On their release Prospero wants to fight Leonell, but Alvaro reminds him that they all share a common bond through their love for Evandra and the three vow friendship. Melora, too, tries to save Evandra by claiming to be her and be executed in her place. Confused as to who is the real Evandra, the Duke decides to have them both executed. At Court two Ambassadors plead unsuccessfully for the lives of the two young women. There is an exchange of noble sentiments after which two of the love rivals stand aside, Evandra's father the Duke of Milan is revealed disguised as the First Ambassador while the Duke's supposedly dead brother turns up alive and well similarly disguised as the Second Ambassador, Alvaro marries Melora while Evandra marries Leonell.

== Dramatis Personae (1661) ==
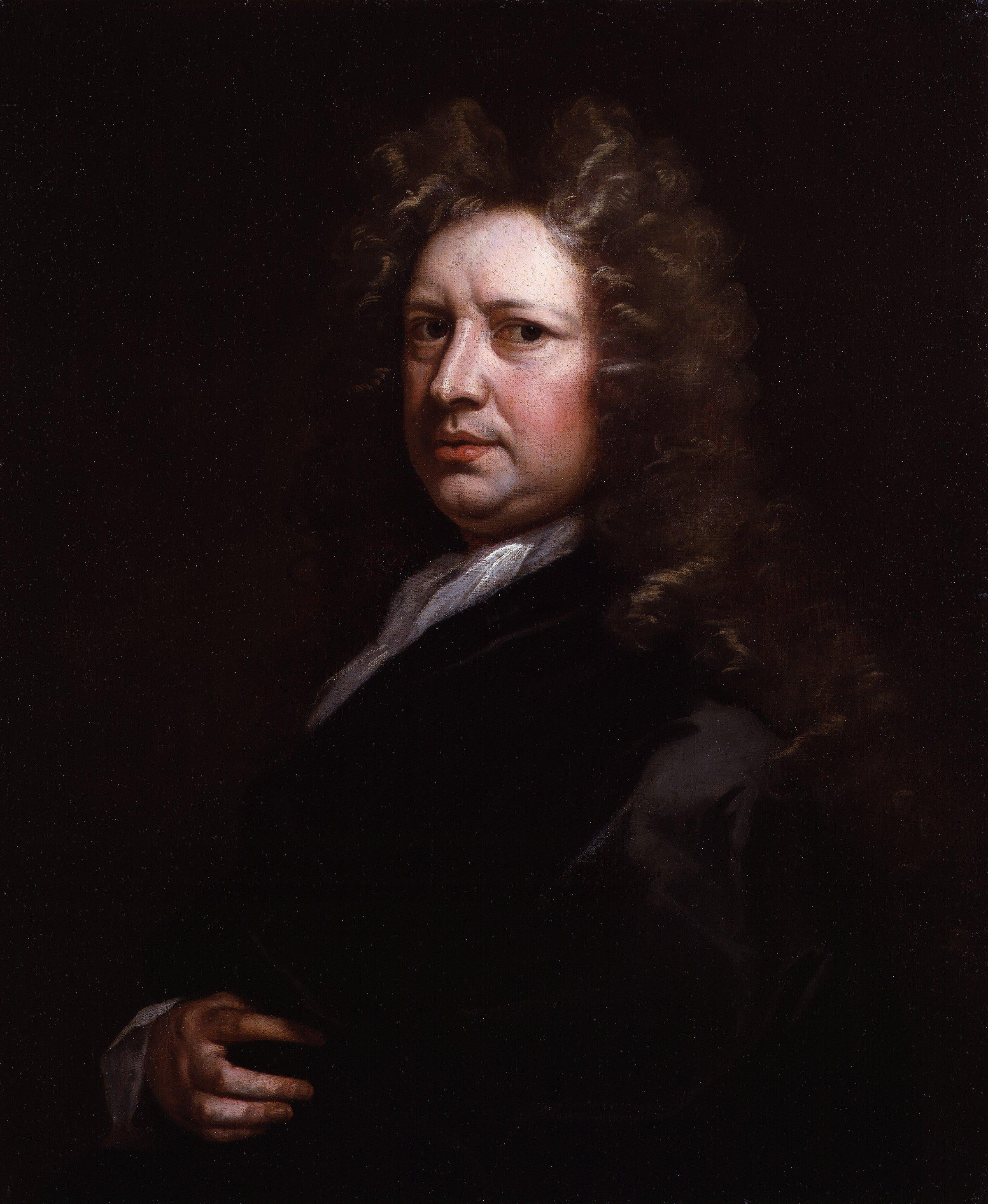
Thomas Betterton played Alvaro, Prince of Savoy

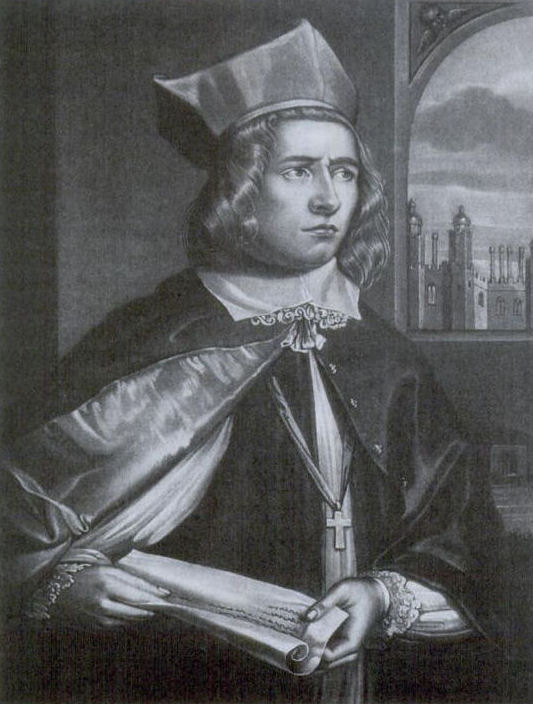
Henry Harris played Prospero in Love and Honour—seen here as Cardinal Wolsey in Davenant's revival of Henry VIII (1664)

- The old Duke of Savoy—Thomas Lilliston

Disguised like Embassadors:

- His brother
- the Duke of Millaine
- Alvaro, Prince of Savoy—Thomas Betterton
- Leonell, Prince of Parma—Joseph Price
- Prospero, a young Count—Henry Harris
- Caladine, an old Counsellor
- Vasco, a Collonell
- Altesto
- Frivolo
- Tristan

Officers and Souldiers.

- Evandra, Heire of Millaine—Hester Davenport
- Melora Sister to Leonell
- An old Widow
- Lelia, her Maide
- Boy
- Musitians
- Souldiers
- Servants

The Scaene Savoy.
