= James Jackson (British Army officer) =

British Army general

General Sir James Jackson GCB KH
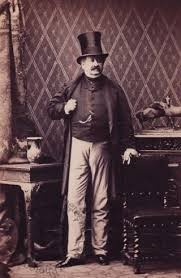
- General Jackson's visiting card
- Born: 1790; Ballina, County Mayo, Ireland
- Died: 31 December 1871 (aged 81); Manchester, England
- Military career
- Allegiance: United Kingdom
- Branch: British Army
- Rank: General
- Conflicts: Peninsular War; Battle of Waterloo
- Awards: Knight Grand Cross of the Order of the Bath

General Sir James Vaughan Jackson, GCB, KH (1790 – 31 December 1871) was an Irish officer in the British Army.

== Military career ==
He was born the third son of Colonel George Jackson, of Carramore House, Ballina, County Mayo, an MP for County Mayo in both the Parliament of Ireland and the UK Parliament, and his wife Maria Rutledge, daughter of William Rutledge of Foxford.

James Jackson joined the British Army as an ensign in the 83rd Foot. He was deployed for service in the Peninsula War in 1809. He received a War Medal with 9 clasps for his participation at the Battle of Bussaco in September 1810, Battle of Fuentes de Oñoro in May 1811, Siege of Ciudad Rodrigo in January 1812, Siege of Badajoz in March 1812, Battle of Salamanca in July 1812, Battle of Vitoria in June 1813, Battle of the Pyrenees in July 1813, Battle of Nivelle in November 1813 and Battle of the Nive in December 1813.

He then took part in the Battle of Waterloo and from 1819 to 1826 served in India and Arabia. He was promoted Major in the 6th Dragoon Guards in 1827 and Lieutenant–Colonel in 1850. He was Commander-in-Chief in the Cape of Good Hope from 1854 to 1859.

In 1856 he was given the colonelcy of the 6th (Inniskilling) Dragoons, transferring in 1860 to the 6th Dragoon Guards and again in 1868 to the 1st Dragoon Guards, a position he held until his death. On 6 February 1865 Jackson was promoted to full General.

He was awarded the K.H. in 1837, K.C.B. in 1856 and G.C.B. in 1865.

He died at Westwood, Whalley Range, Manchester on 31 December 1871.

Military offices
| Preceded by Thomas William Brotherton | Colonel of the 1st Dragoon Guards; 1868–1872 | Succeeded by Henry Aitchison Hankey |
| Preceded by Sir Alexander Kennedy Clark-Kennedy | Colonel of the 6th Dragoon Guards (Carabiniers); 1860–1868 | Succeeded by Sir John Rowland Smyth |
| Preceded by George P. Adams | 6th (Inniskilling) Dragoons; 1856–1860 | Succeeded by Thomas Marten |
