= Henry Aitchison Hankey =

General Henry Aitchison Hankey
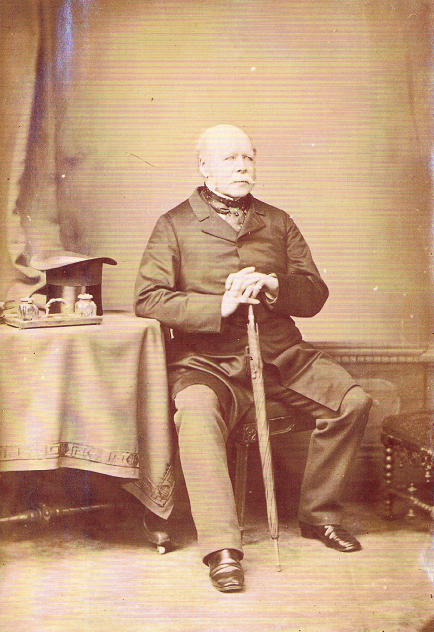
- Born: 6 October 1805
- Died: 24 June 1886 (aged 80)
- Military career
- Allegiance: United Kingdom
- Branch: British Army
- Service years: 1823–1886
- Rank: Major-General
- Commands: 1st King's Dragoon Guards

General Henry Aitchison Hankey (6 October 1805 – 24 June 1886) was a senior British Army officer.

== Military career ==
Hankey was commissioned as an cornet in the 1st King's Dragoon Guards June 1823. Promoted to lieutenant-colonel in March 1839, he took command of the 1st King's Dragoon Guards in 1844 and led its successful deployment to Ireland in 1848 before handing over to his successor in 1852. He was promoted to major-general in 1857, to lieutenant-general in 1864 and to full general in 1871. He went on to serve as colonel of the 3rd The King's Own Hussars from 1866 to 1872 and as colonel of the 1st King's Dragoon Guards from 1872 until his death in 1886.

== Family ==
Hankey married Caroline Robarts in September 1839. After the death of his first wife, he married Lady Emily Pennefather, daughter of The 1st Earl of Glengall, in September 1852.

Military offices
Preceded by Peter Latour	Colonel of 3rd The King's Own Hussars; 1872–1886	Succeeded by Sir George Lockwood
Preceded by Sir James Jackson	Colonel of 1st King's Dragoon Guards; 1872–1886	Succeeded by Sir James Sayer
