= John Lanier =

English general (d. 1692)

Lieutenant-General Sir John Lanier
- Died: 1692
- Military career
- Allegiance: United Kingdom
- Branch: British Army
- Rank: Lieutenant-General
- Conflicts: Monmouth Rebellion; Williamite War in Ireland; Nine Years' War

Lieutenant-General Sir John Lanier (died 1692) was an English army officer.

== Military career ==
Lanier was wounded and lost an eye while serving under the Duke of Monmouth in France. He served as Lieutenant Governor of Jersey from 1679 to 1684. In 1685 he raised Lanier's Regiment of Horse or the 2nd Queen's Regiment of Horse, named in honour of Queen Mary, consort of King James II, as part of the response to the Monmouth Rebellion.

He declared allegiance to William III and secured Edinburgh Castle for him in 1689. He was deployed to Ireland and took part in the Battle of the Boyne in July 1690, the Siege of Limerick in August 1690 and the Battle of Aughrim in July 1691 during the Williamite War in Ireland. He was badly wounded at the Battle of Steenkerque in the Netherlands in August 1692 during the Nine Years' War and died shortly afterwards.

Military offices
Preceded by Regiment raised	Colonel of The Queen's Regiment of Horse; 1685–1692	Succeeded by Henry Lumley
