= Strawhead (band) =

English folk band, 1974–2012

- Origin: Northern England
- Genres: Folk music
- Years active: 1974–2012
- Members: Gregg Butler; Malcolm Gibbons; Chris Pollington
- Website: http://www.strawhead.org.uk/

Strawhead was a northern England, Preston-based folk musical group founded in 1974, that specialized in historical British music. Bolstering their national reputation for their accurate and powerful interpretation of the genre of social history of the 16th to 19th centuries, the group's repertoire included popular songs from the English Civil War era to the Victorian period performed on period and electronic instruments.

== Band members ==
- Gregg Butler (vocals, cornett, cittern, recorder, keyed bugle, ophicleide, euphonium)
- Malcolm Gibbons (vocals, 12-string guitar, laúd)
- Chris Pollington (keyboard, midi horn, accordion, guitar)
- Alison Younger (occasional vocalist)

== Career ==
The group engaged in projects associated with disparate musical traditions in British history. In October 2005, they celebrated the 200th anniversary of 21 October 1805 Battle of Trafalgar through a performance at the 2005 Canalside Festival in the market town of Banbury. Other projects included music of the English Civil War and the Victorian period. The Fylde Folk Festival website listed "subjects such as the colonisation of America, the English Civil War, Marlborough’s Wars in the Low Countries, Monmouth’s Rebellion, and drinking songs."

According to a BBC review, "Strawhead have enjoyed considerable success appearing at the top of the bill at most of the UK's major folk festivals, becoming firm favourites among folk fans." In addition, they achieved worldwide recognition for their distinctive sound and interpretation of songs.

Strawhead fuelled controversy when they created a work based on a British ballad entitled "The Bold Fusilier", the tune to which, some suggested, predated the similar 1903 tune to "Waltzing Matilda", Australia's most widely known folk song. However, most sources reject the idea that the British song served as a parent work for the Australian.

In the 1970s, Strawhead wrote four more verses for "The Bold Fusilier", covering Marlborough's Wars of 1702 to 1713, calling their revised song "The Rochester Recruiting Sergeant". This was adopted by a generation of folkies and battle re-enactors, many of whom came to believe that "The Rochester Recruiting Sergeant" was truly from the early 18th century. Some mistakenly believed that the 1903 tune of "Waltzing Matilda" was borrowed from "The Rochester Recruiting Sergeant", rather than the reverse, even though the sleeve notes to Strawhead's 1978 record provided an explanation, and attributed the song to Pete Coe.

In April 2012, Strawhead announced that they were to retire from live performances.

== Selected discography ==
- Farewell Musket Pike and Drum – 1977
- Fortunes of War – 1978
- Songs from the Book of England – 1980
- Through Smoke and Fire – 1982
- Gentlemen of Fortune – 1984
- Sedgemoor – 1985
- Law Lies Bleeding – 1987
- Tiffin - 1990
- The Old Lamb & Flag: the Songs of Preston and its Guild - 1992 - Strawhead + Ken Howard, Clive Pownceby, Pat Ryan, Tom Walsh & Alison Younger
- Victorian Ballads – 1993
- A Walled Town and a Ragged Staff – 1995
- Songs of the Civil War – 1997
- Argent - 1999
- Sweethearts, Salts and Sailors - 2001
- A Hertfordshire Garland - 2002
- Late Bottled Vintage - 2002
- So The Boys Got Together, and Formed a Band....... – 2004
- Bold Nelson's Praise Disc 1 and Disc 2 – 2005
- Sovereigns - 2007
- A Soldier's Life - 2010
