= Henry Lumley =

British Army general

General Henry Lumley
- Born: c.1658
- Died: 18 October 1722 (aged 63)
- Burial place: Sawbridgeworth, Hertfordshire
- Relatives: Richard Lumley, 1st Earl of Scarbrough (brother)
- Military career
- Allegiance: Kingdom of Great Britain
- Branch: British Army
- Service years: c.1685–1717
- Rank: General
- Commands: Queen's Regiment of Horse
- Conflicts: Nine Years' War; Battle of Steenkerque; Battle of Landen; Siege of Namur; War of the Spanish Succession; Battle of Schellenberg; Battle of Blenheim; Battle of Ramillies; Battle of Oudenarde; Battle of Malplaquet

General Henry Lumley (c. 1658 – 18 October 1722) was a British Army officer and Governor of Jersey.

== Military career ==
Henry Lumley was the second son of John Lumley and Mary Compton, and younger brother of Richard Lumley, 1st Earl of Scarbrough.

He was promoted captain in The Queen's Regiment of Horse on 13 June 1685, and served with the regiment during the War of the Grand Alliance, becoming noted for courage. On 10 August 1692, he was promoted colonel of the regiment, replacing Sir John Lanier, killed at the Battle of Steenkerque, and again to brigadier-general in 1693. He fought at the Battle of Landen, and helped cover the escape of William III during the retreat there. He was present in at the Siege of Namur (1695), and was promoted major general on 1 January 1696. Lumley returned to England after the Peace of Ryswick.

He entered Parliament in 1701 as Knight of the shire for Sussex and again from 1702 to 1705. He later sat for Arundel from 1715 to 1722.

He married first Elizabeth Thimbleby, and second Anne Wiseman. His daughter by Anne, Frances Lumley, died in 1719.

On 27 February 1702 he sailed for Flanders, to take part in the War of the Spanish Succession. He was promoted lieutenant-general on 11 February 1703. In 1704, he commanded the British horse at the Battle of Schellenberg, and subsequently fought at Blenheim, Ramillies, Oudenarde and Malplaquet. He served as Governor of Jersey from 1704 to 1722. On 30 January 1711, he was promoted general. Like his former commander Marlborough, he was a Hanoverian Tory who supported the Hanoverian Succession of 1714.

Lumley resigned his colonelcy in 1717 and died in 1722, and is buried at Sawbridgeworth.

Parliament of England
Preceded by Sir William Thomas; Robert Orme	Member of Parliament for Sussex; 1701; With: John Miller	Succeeded by Sir William Thomas; Sir Henry Peachey
Preceded by Sir William Thomas; Sir Henry Peachey	Member of Parliament for Sussex; 1702–1705; With: Sir Thomas Pelham	Succeeded by John Morley Trevor; Sir George Parker
Parliament of Great Britain
Preceded by Lord Thomond; Lord Lumley	Member of Parliament for Arundel; 1715–1722; With: Thomas Micklethwait 1715–1718; Joseph Micklethwaite 1718–1722	Succeeded by Joseph Micklethwait; Thomas Lumley
Military offices
Preceded by Sir John Lanier	Colonel of The Queen's Regiment of Horse; 1692–1717	Succeeded by Lord Irvine
