= Robert de Vere, 19th Earl of Oxford =

British soldier

The Right Honourable The Earl of Oxford
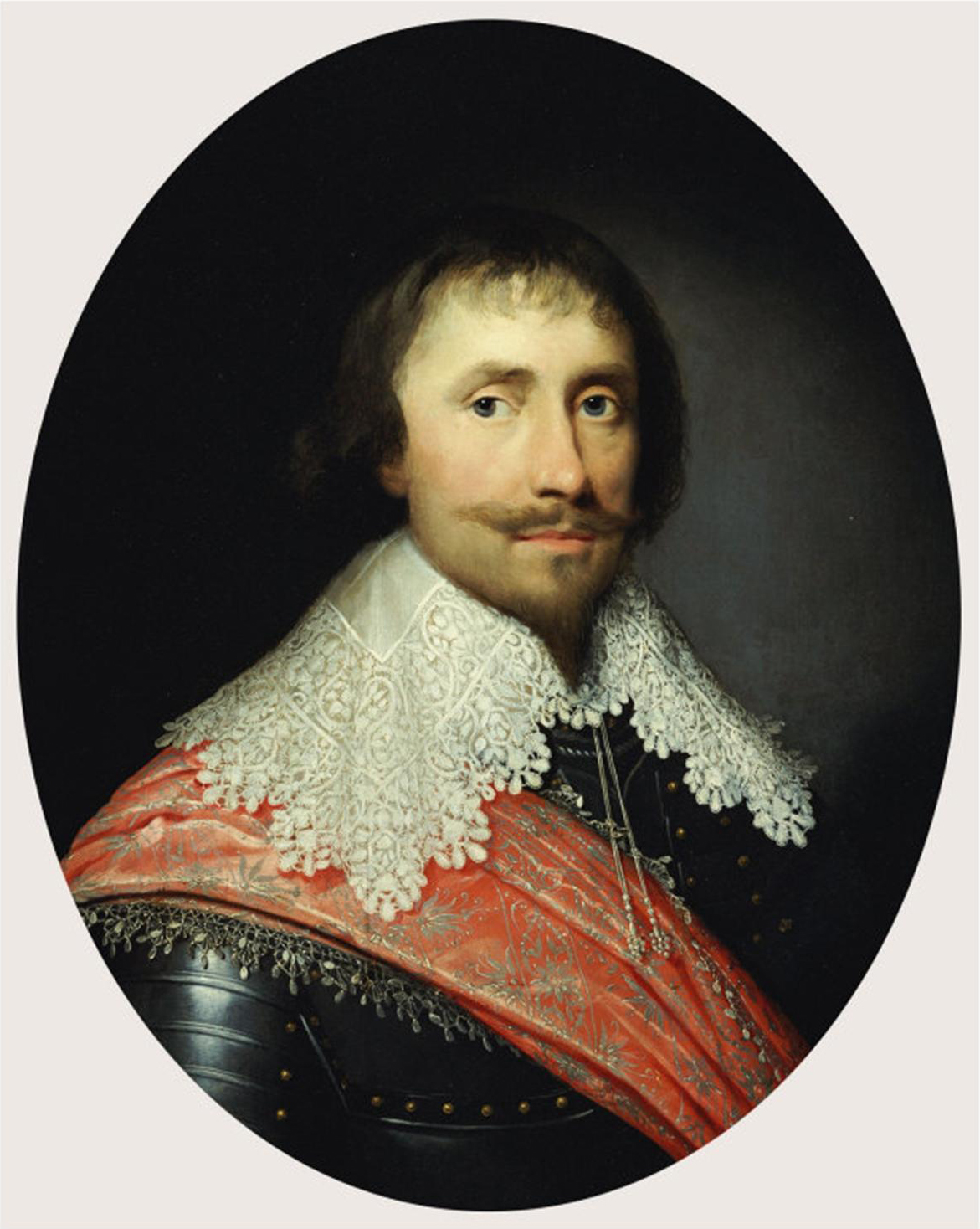
- Robert de Vere by Cornelis Johnson, 1629.
- Born: after 23 August 1575
- Died: 7 August 1632; Maastricht
- Noble family: de Vere
- Spouse: Beatrice van Hemmend
- Issue: Aubrey de Vere, 20th Earl of Oxford
- Father: Hugh de Vere
- Mother: Eleanor Walsh

Robert de Vere, 19th Earl of Oxford (b. after 23 August 1575 – 7 August 1632) was an English soldier, and the penultimate Earl of Oxford.

== Life ==
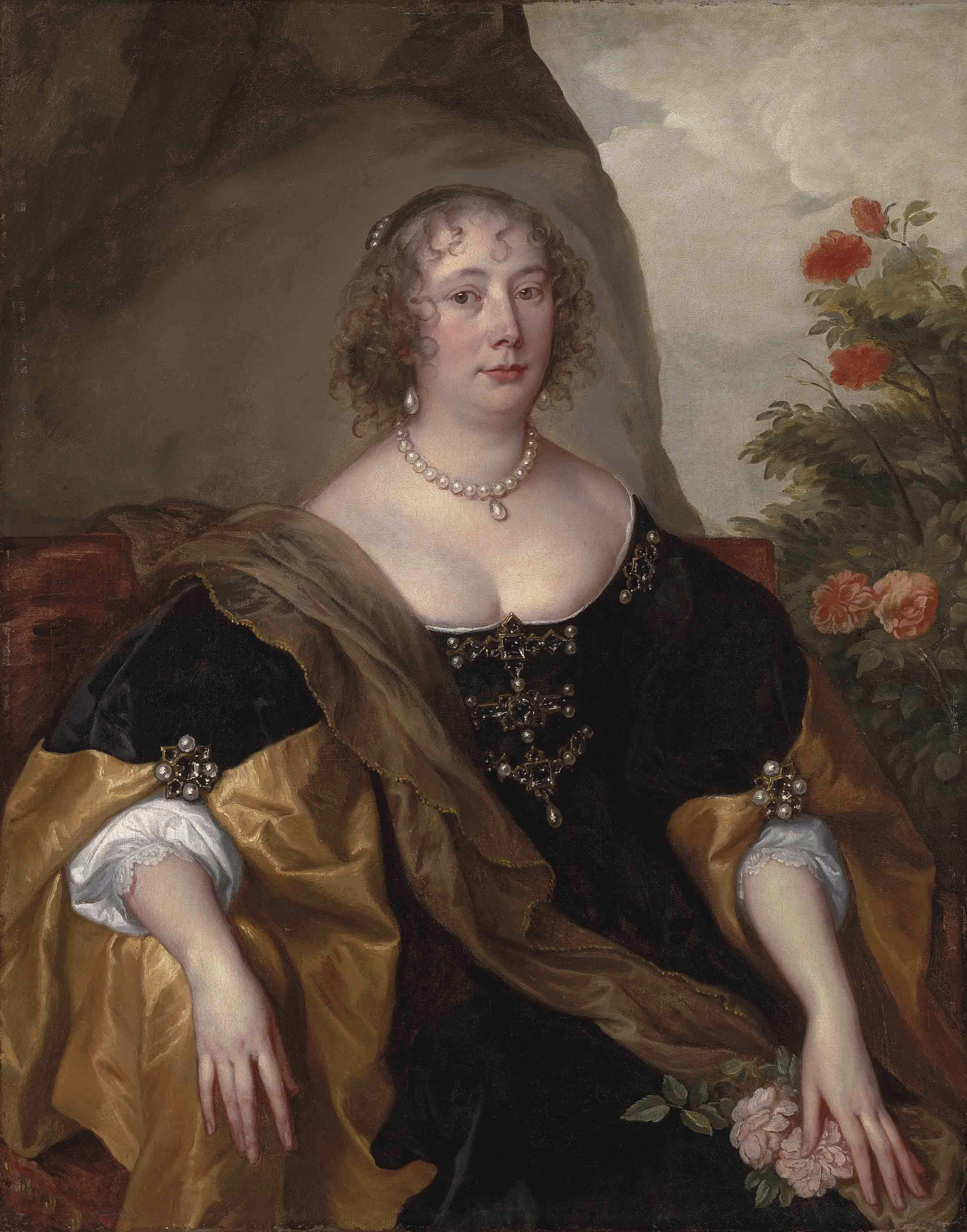
Beatrice, Robert de Vere's wife (Anthony van Dyck)

Robert was the son of Hugh de Vere (a great-grandson of John de Vere, 15th Earl of Oxford) and Eleanor Walsh. He was the second cousin of Henry de Vere, 18th Earl of Oxford.

When Henry died sometime between 2 and 9 June 1625, Robert emerged as the heir apparent to the earldom. Robert's claim was by his descent from the 15th Earl of Oxford, but his title was not immediately confirmed, although his right to the peerage was acknowledged by the Lord Chief Justice, Sir Ranulph Crewe in his celebrated "Time hath his revolutions" judgment. He was considered to have an inadequate estate in England, and only after a long debate in the House of Lords in April 1626 did he eventually secure his title and right to attend Parliament. He subsequently returned to his home in the Low Countries, where he had made a career for himself as a soldier in the Dutch army. He was a captain of a company amongst other stationed in the city of Amersfoort.

He married Beatrice, or Bauck, daughter of the Dutch nobleman Sierck van Hemmema. In 1632, Robert was killed while taking part in the siege of Maastricht. His title passed to his five-year-old son Aubrey, who would, in turn, become the last in an almost 600-year line of de Vere earls of Oxford.

Peerage of England
Preceded by Henry de Vere	Earl of Oxford; 1625–1632	Succeeded by Aubrey de Vere
