= 1st King's Dragoon Guards =

British Army cavalry regiment

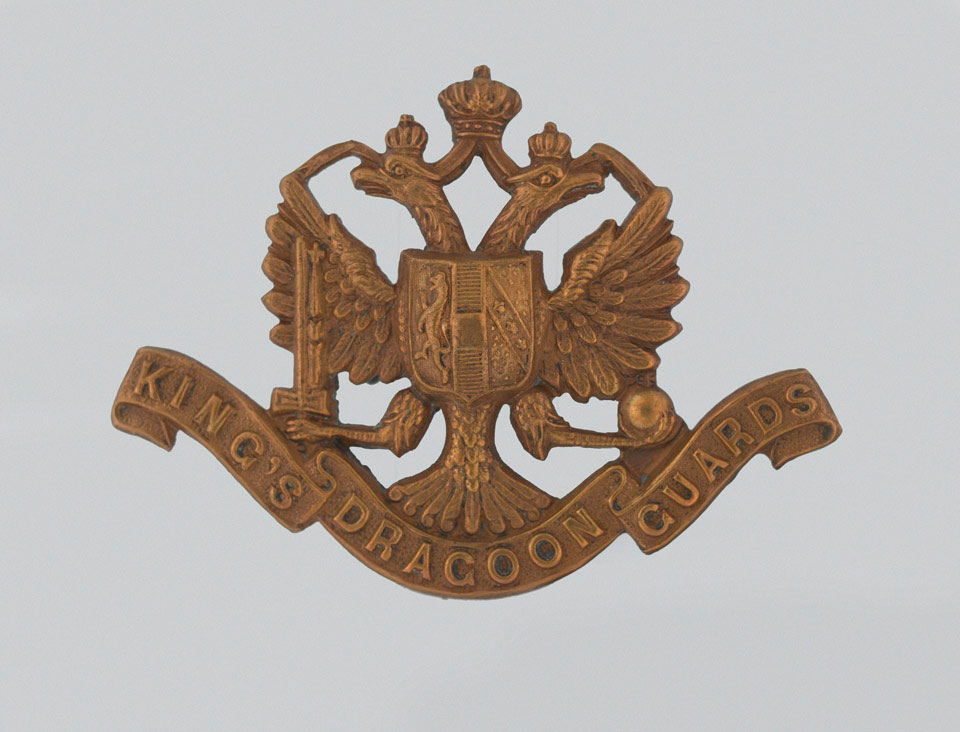
- c. 1904 regimental cap badge for other ranks
- Active: 1685–1959
- Allegiance: England (1685–1707); Great Britain (1707–1800); United Kingdom (1801–1959)
- Branch: English Army (1685–1707); British Army (1707–1959)
- Type: Dragoons; Armoured cavalry
- Role: Armoured reconnaissance Artillery observer Direct fire Manoeuvre warfare Patrolling
- Size: Regiment
- Part of: Royal Armoured Corps
- Nicknames: Bland's Dragoons, The KDGs, The Trades Union, The Kings Dancing Girls
- March: Quick: Radetzky March; Slow: The King's Dragoon Guards

Commanders
- Ceremonial chief: Franz Joseph I of Austria

The 1st King's Dragoon Guards was a cavalry regiment of the British Army. it was raised by Sir John Lanier in 1685 as the 2nd Queen's Regiment of Horse, named in honour of Queen Mary of Modena. The regiment was renamed the 2nd King's Own Regiment of Horse in 1714 in honour of George I of Great Britain. It was renamed the 1st King's Dragoon Guards in 1751, and the regiment served as horse cavalry until 1937 when it was mechanised with light tanks. The regiment served in the First World War and became part of the Royal Armoured Corps in 1939 before seeing service in the Second World War. In 1959, the regiment was amalgamated with the 2nd Dragoon Guards (Queen's Bays) to form the 1st The Queen's Dragoon Guards.

== History ==
=== Early history ===
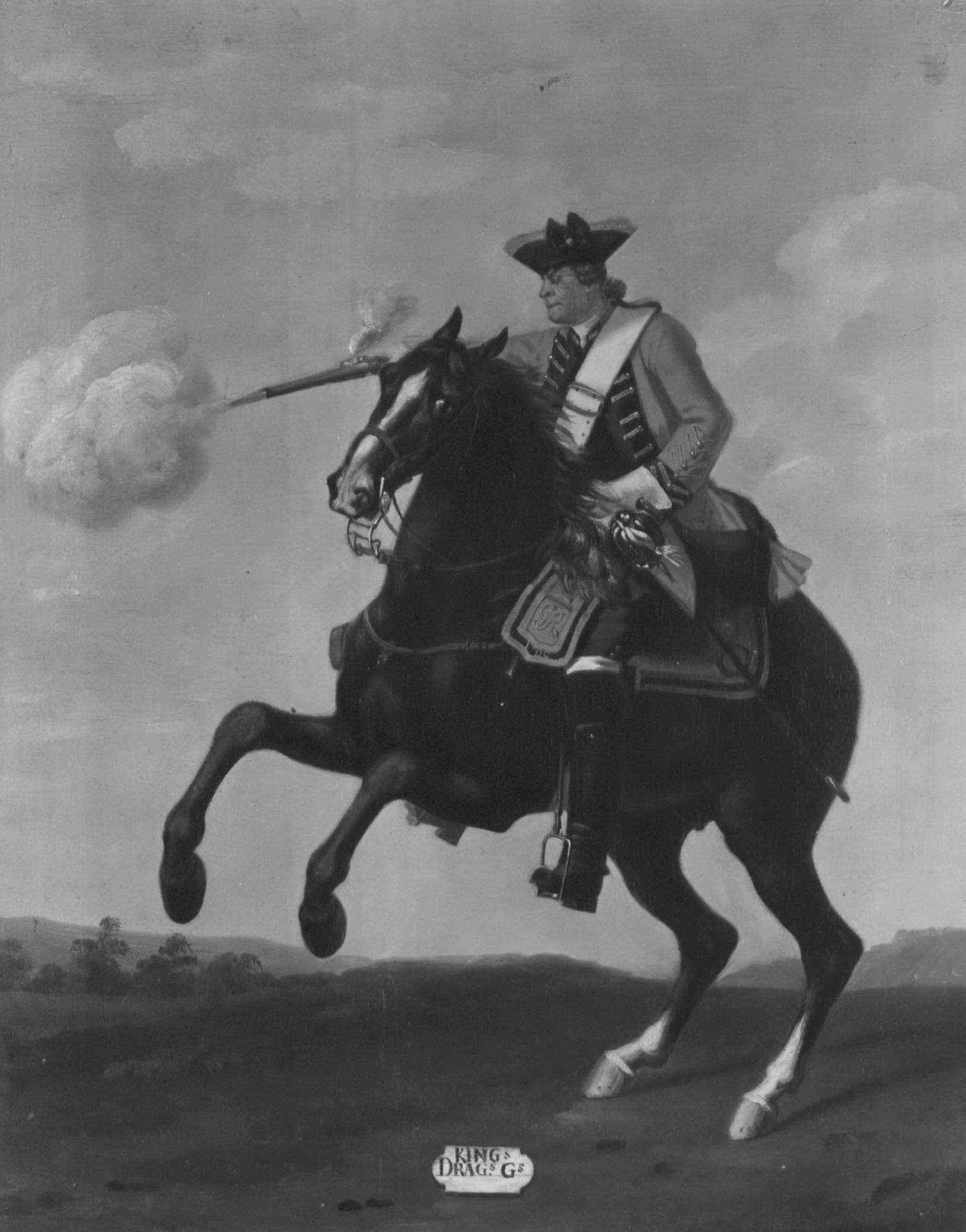
c. 1751 painting of a regimental private

The regiment was raised by Sir John Lanier in 1685 as Lanier's Regiment of Horse or the 2nd Queen's Regiment of Horse, named in honour of Queen Mary, consort of King James II, as part of the response to the Monmouth Rebellion.

The regiment saw action at the Battle of the Boyne in July 1690 and the Battle of Aughrim in July 1691 during the Williamite War in Ireland. It also fought at the Battle of Blenheim in August 1704, the Battle of Ramillies in May 1706, the Battle of Oudenarde in July 1708, and the Battle of Malplaquet in September 1709 during the War of the Spanish Succession. The regiment was renamed the 2nd King's Own Regiment of Horse in 1714 in honour of George I. It saw action again at the Battle of Dettingen in June 1743 during the War of the Austrian Succession. The regiment was renamed the 1st King's Dragoon Guards in 1751. The regiment made a desperate charge which saved the army at the Battle of Corbach in July 1760, and then made another famous charge at the Battle of Warburg later that month during the Seven Years' War. The regiment charged again with devastating effect at the Battle of Waterloo in June 1815 during the Napoleonic Wars.

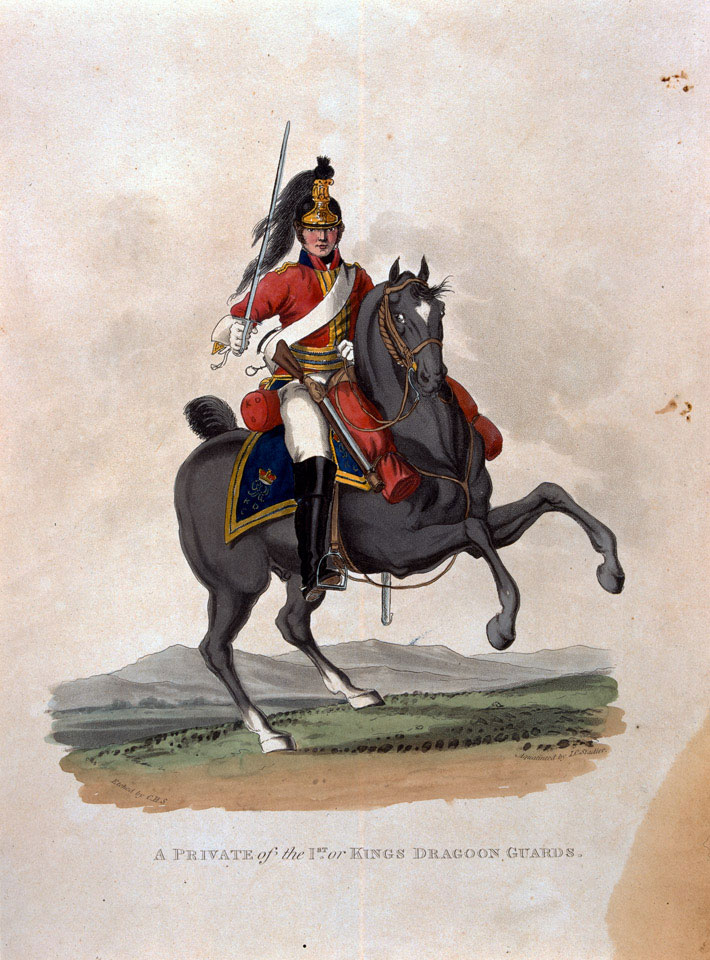
1812 engraving of a regimental private

The regiment took part in the response to the Indian Rebellion in 1857, as well as the Battle of Taku Forts in August 1860, and the capture of Peking during the Second Opium War. A detachment of the regiment was responsible for the capture of King Cetshwayo at the Battle of Ulundi in July 1879 during the Anglo-Zulu War, and the regiment saw action again at the Battle of Laing's Nek in January 1881 during the First Boer War. The regiment was employed chasing the elusive General Christiaan de Wet in spring 1901 during the Second Boer War.

=== Habsburg connection ===
In March 1896, Austria-Hungarian Emperor Franz Joseph I became Colonel-in-Chief of the regiment. At the same time the double-headed Austrian eagle became the cap-badge of the regiment, and it adopted Radetzky March as its regimental march. On the occasion of his Diamond Jubilee on 2 December 1908, the Emperor instituted the Inhaber-Jubiläums-Medaille für Ausländer (Commander's Jubilee Medal for Foreigners) to celebrate his 60 years on the throne. Some of the 40 golden, 635 silver, and 2000 bronze medals were awarded to officers and private soldiers in the regiment. The ceremonial helmet with the badge of the 1st King's Dragoon Guards which was given to Emperor Franz Joseph I on his appointment as colonel-in-chief is now on display at the Museum of Military History, Vienna.

=== First World War ===
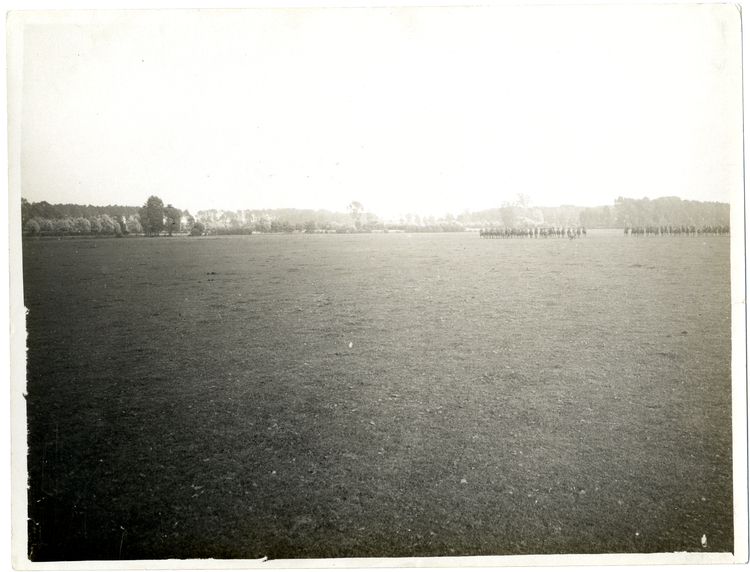
A very distant view of the King's Dragoon Guards charging across open country in France in July 1915

The regiment, which had been was stationed at Lucknow in India at the start of the war, landed at Marseille as part of the 8th (Lucknow) Cavalry Brigade in the 1st Indian Cavalry Division in November 1914 for service on the Western Front. The regiment saw action at the Battle of Festubert in May 1915, the Second Battle of Ypres also in May 1915, and the Battle of Morval in September 1916, but returned to India in October 1917.

=== Third Anglo-Afghan War ===
The regiment remained in garrison at Meerut until October 1918 when it exchanged stations with 21st (Empress of India's) Lancers and moved to Risalpur. On 2 May 1919 Afghan troops seized control of wells on the Indian side of the border. The Afghan Amir Amanullah was warned to withdraw, but his answer was to send more troops to reinforce those at the wells and to move other Afghan units to various points on the frontier. The regiment was mobilised on 6 May and formed part of the British Indian Army's 1st (Risalpur) Cavalry Brigade. It served throughout the Third Anglo-Afghan War and saw action at the Khyber Pass. At Dakka – a village in Afghan territory, north west of the Khyber Pass – on 16 May, the regiment made one of the last recorded charges by a British horsed cavalry regiment as it was already apparent the old world would be giving way to mechanisation.

=== Second World War ===
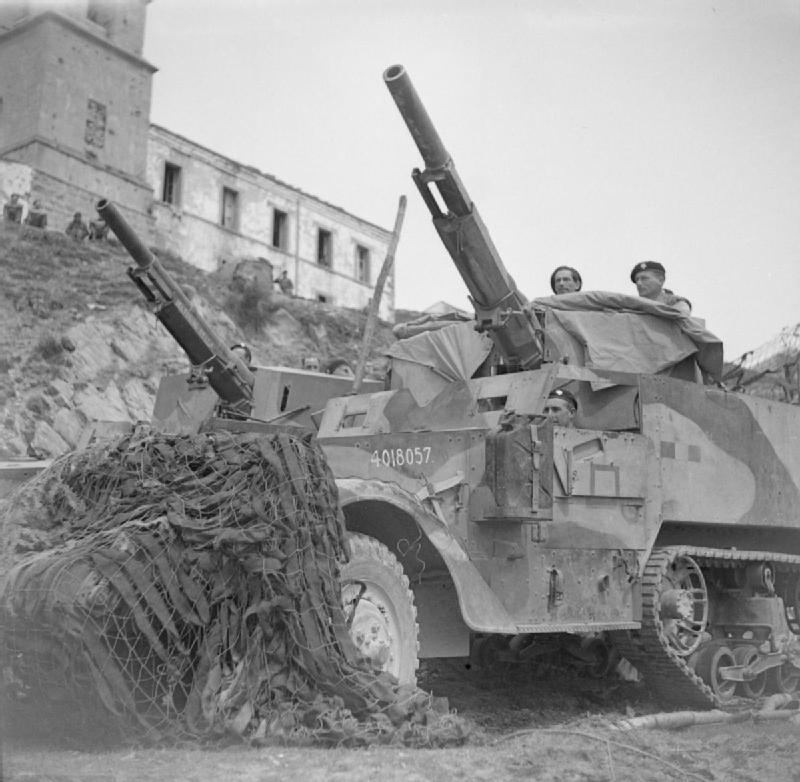
Two M3 half-tracks of the regiment in Italy, 7 May 1944

The regiment took part in all the major battles of the North African campaign including the Relief of Tobruk in November 1941. The regiment, then serving as the armoured car reconnaissance regiment of Lieutenant General Richard McCreery's X Corps, landed at Salerno during the Allied invasion of Italy in September 1943 against concentrated enemy opposition and were the first Allied unit into the city of Naples in early October 1943. The Welsh writer Norman Lewis, in his celebrated account of life in Naples claimed that the King's Dragoon Guards was the first British unit to reach Naples in 1943, and that many of its officers immediately went on a looting spree, cutting paintings from their frames in the prince's palace. The regiment later took part in the Battle for Monte la Difensa in December 1943 and the advance to the Gothic Line in late 1944.

=== Post-war ===
The regiment was posted to Mandatory Palestine in September 1945 and to Libya in January 1947 before being deployed on home duties at Omagh, Northern Ireland, in February 1948. The regiment moved to Adams Barracks in Rahlstedt in November 1951, and to Mcleod Barracks in Neumünster in April 1953.

In 1956 the regiment was sent on active service in Malaya during the Emergency: during this time the regiment took part in counterinsurgency operations in both mounted operations (armoured cars) and on foot in the dense jungles operating from a base at Johor Bahru.

The regiment merged with the Queen's Bays (2nd Dragoon Guards) in 1959 to form the 1st The Queen's Dragoon Guards.

== Regimental museum ==
The regimental collection is displayed at Firing Line: Cardiff Castle Museum of the Welsh Soldier in Cardiff.

== Battle honours ==
The regiment's battle honours were as follows:

- Early wars: Blenheim, Ramillies, Oudenarde, Malplaquet, Dettingen, Warburg, Beaumont, Waterloo, Sevastopol, Taku Forts, Pekin 1860, South Africa 1879, South Africa 1901–02
- The Great War: Somme 1916, Morval, France and Flanders 1914–17
- Between the Wars: Afghanistan 1919
- The Second World War: Beda Fomm, Defence of Tobruk, Tobruk 1941, Tobruk Sortie, Relief of Tobruk, Gazala, Bir Hacheim, Defence of Alamein Line, Alam el Halfa, El Agheila, Advance on Tripoli, Tebaga Gap, Point 201 (Roman Wall), El Hamma, Akarit, Tunis, North Africa 1941–43, Capture of Naples, Scafati Bridge, Monte Camino, Garigliano Crossing, Capture of Perugia, Arezzo, Gothic Line, Italy 1943–44, Athens, Greece 1944–45

== Notable members of the regiment ==
- Sir David Dundas – Colonel, 1813–1820
- John Doogan – a private who received the Victoria Cross, First Boer War, 28 January 1881, Laing's Nek, South Africa
- Alfred Hutton – author, antiquarian and swordsman
- James Lockhart Little – rider who won the 1848 Grand National steeplechase
- William Pitt – future Prime Minister, was an officer in the regiment (1731–36) until after arriving in Parliament.
- Banastre Tarleton – cavalry officer during the US Revolution
- Francis Younghusband – soldier, explorer, spiritualist
- Walter Clopton Wingfield – inventor of lawn tennis 1874

== Colonels-in-Chief ==
Colonels-in-Chief were as follows:

- 1896–1914: Field Marshal HIM Franz Joseph I, the Emperor of Austria & King of Hungary, KG

== Regimental colonels ==
Regimental colonels were as follows:

The Queen's Regiment of Horse

- 1685–1692: Lt-Gen. Sir John Lanier
- 1692–1717: Gen. Hon. Henry Lumley

The King's Own Regiment of Horse – (1714)

- 1717–1721: Col. Richard Ingram
- 1721–1733: F.M. Sir Richard Temple
- 1733–1742: Lt-Gen. Henry Herbert
- 1743–1752: Gen. Sir Philip Honywood, KB

1st (The King's) Dragoon Guards – (1751)

- 1752–1763: Lt-Gen. Humphrey Bland
- 1763–1779: Gen. John Mostyn
- 1779–1796: F.M. Sir George Howard, KB
- 1796–1810: Gen. Sir William Augustus Pitt, KB
- 1810–1813: Gen. Francis Augustus Eliott
- 1813–1820: Gen. Sir David Dundas, GCB
- 1820–1821: Gen. Francis Edward Gwyn
- 1821–1827: Gen. William Cartwright
- 1827–1840: Gen. Sir Henry Fane, GCB
- 1840–1851: Gen. Hon. Sir William Lumley, GCB
- 1851–1859: Gen. Charles Murray Cathcart, GCB (Lord Greenock)
- 1859–1868: Gen. Sir Thomas William Brotherton, GCB
- 1868–1872: Gen. Sir James Jackson, GCB, KH
- 1872–1886: Gen. Henry Aitchison Hankey
- 1886–1908: Lt-Gen. Sir James Robert Steadman Sayer, KCB
- 1908–1926: Maj-Gen. William Vesey Brownlow, CB

1st King's Dragoon Guards – (1921)

- 1926–1940: Lt-Gen. Sir Charles James Briggs, KCB, KCMG
- 1940–1945: Brig-Gen. Alexander Gore Arkwright Hore-Ruthven, VC, GCMG, CB, DSO & Bar, KStJ
- 1945–1953: Brig. Sidney Howes, DSO, MC
- 1953–1959: Brig. John Gerard Edward Tiarks

== See also ==
- British cavalry during the First World War

== Sources ==
- Lewis, Norman (2005). Naples '44: A World War II Diary of Occupied Italy. Da Capo Press. ISBN 978-0786714384.
- Stolzer, Johann; Steeb, Christian (1996). Österreichs Orden vom Mittelalter bis zur Gegenwart. Akademische Druck- u. Verlagsanstalt Graz. ISBN 3-201-01649-7.
