= HMS Scarborough (1696) =

History

England
- Name: HMS Scarborough
- Ordered: 22 February 1695
- Builder: James Parker, Southampton
- Launched: 24 March 1696
- Commissioned: 1696
- Renamed: Garland 10 April 1712
- Captured: 1 November 1710
- Fate: Sold at Deptford on 25 August 1739

France
- Name: Le Scarborough
- Acquired: 1 November 1710
- In service: 1710–1712
- Captured: 31 March 1712
- Fate: Captured by two British ships and renamed HMS Garland

Great Britain
- Name: HMS Garland
- Acquired: 31 March 1712
- Commissioned: April 1712

General characteristics as built
- Class & type: 32-gun fifth rate
- Tons burthen: 3918/94 tons (bm)
- Length: 108 ft 0 in (32.92 m) gundeck; 90 ft 0 in (27.43 m) keel for tonnage
- Beam: 28 ft 7 in (8.71 m)
- Depth of hold: 10 ft 9 in (3.28 m)
- Propulsion: Sails
- Sail plan: Full-rigged ship
- Complement: 145/110
- Armament: as built 32 guns; 4/4 × demi-culverins (LD); 22/20 × 6-pdr guns (UD); 6/4 × 4-pdr guns (QD)

General characteristics 1719 Establishment
- Class & type: 20-gun sixth rate
- Tons burthen: 3755/94 tons (bm)
- Length: 106 ft 1 in (32.33 m) gundeck; 87 ft 10 in (26.77 m) keel for tonnage
- Beam: 28 ft 4 in (8.64 m)
- Depth of hold: 9 ft 2 in (2.79 m)
- Propulsion: Sails
- Sail plan: Full-rigged ship
- Armament: 1719 Establishment 20 guns; 20 × 6-pdr guns (UD)

HMS Scarborough was a 32-gun fifth rate built under contract by James Parker of Southampton in 1695/96. She served in the trade protection and counter-piracy operations during her service. She was captured by the French, then recaptured by the British and renamed Garland, She was converted to a fireship for the Baltic then the Mediterranean. She was at the Battle of Passero in 1718. She was reduced to a 20-gun sixth rate in 1717. Rebuilt to the 1719 Establishment in 1721, she was finally sold in 1744.

She was the third vessel to bear the name Scarborough since it was used for a 10-gun ketch, built by Frame of Scarborough 2 May 1691 and captured by the French on 12 January 1693.

As HMS Garland, she was the fifth vessel to bear this name since it was used for a 38/48-gun galleon built in 1590 and sunk as a wharf in 1618 at Chatham.

As HMS Garland, she was awarded the Battle Honour Passero 1718.

== Construction and specifications ==
She was ordered on 22 February 1695 to be built under contract by James Parker of Southampton. She was launched on 24 March 1696. Her dimensions were a gundeck of 108 feet 0 inches (32.92 metres) with a keel of 90 feet 0 inches (27.43 metres) for tonnage calculation with a breadth of 28 feet 7 inches (8.71 metres) and a depth of hold of 10 feet 9 inches (3.28 metres). Her builder's measure tonnage was calculated as 3918/94 tons (burthen).

The gun armament initially was four demi-culverins (Note: A demi-culverin was a gun of 3,400 pounds with a four-inch bore firing a 9.5-pound shot with an eight-pound powder charge) on the lower deck (LD) with two pair of guns per side. The upper deck (UD) battery would consist of between twenty and twenty-two 6-pounder guns (Note: A 6-pounder was a Dutch gun used to replace the saker) with ten or eleven guns per side. The gun battery would be completed by four 4-pounder guns (Note: A minion renamed the 4-pounder was a gun of 1,000 pounds with a 3.5-inch bore firing a 4-pound shot with a 4-pound powder charge.) on the quarterdeck (QD) with two to three guns per side. She was completed at an initial cost of £2,660.15.0d (Note: A total cost accounting for inflation of approximately £434,200 in today's money) to build.

== Commissioned service ==
=== Service 1696–1710 ===
She was commissioned in 1696 under the command of Richard Short for Fleet Service. She took the French privateer La Volontaire on 20 July 1696. She went to the West Indies to reinforce Vice-Admiral John Neville in 1697 with Captain George Mee's Squadron. Firstly they move towards Cartagena, then went to San Domingo destroying a number of privateers, The fleet then moved to Havana, however, the governor denied them entrance, so they sailed to Virginia. After the death of Admiral Neville, Captain Thomas Dilkes brought the squadron to Home Waters. In 1701, she was under Captain Stephen Elliott. December 1701 she came under the command of Captain Thomas Hudson in the West Indies. In 1702, she was assigned Captain Henry Fowles for service in the East Indies. Captain Fowles died on 24 April 1704. Captain Stepen Hutchings took over in April 1704. She was assigned to the West Indies in 1707. Sometime around July 1708 she was under Captain Edward Holland at Jamaica. She escorted a convoy to Guinea, Africa in 1710.

=== French service 1710–1712 ===
She was captured by a 30-gun French privateer off Cape Lobos, Guinea on 1 November 1710. She was incorporated into French service as Le Scarborough. She was retaken on 31 March 1712 by the 50-gun Anglesea and the 40-gun Fowey. She was recommissioned in April 1712 under Captain Walter Ross and sailed to Home Waters to pay off.

=== Service as HMS Garland 1712–1721 ===
She was renamed Garland by Admiralty Order (AO) 10 April 1712. She underwent a Large repair costing £3,172.17.7d (Note: A total cost accounting for inflation of approximately £566,200 in today's money) from May to October 1712 at Woolwich Dockyard. She was recommissioned as HMS Garland in June 1712 under the command of Lieutenant John Ogilvie followed by Captain Edmund Hooke in July. She was prepared for service in September 1715. She recommissioned in October 1715 under the command of Captain Ellis Brand for service in the Baltic. She was ordered to be reduced to a fireship by AO 18 February 1717. She underwent a small repair and conversion to a fireship costing £840.19.1.25d (Note: A total cost accounting for inflation of approximately £152,300 in today's money) from February to March 1717. When completed, she was commissioned under Captain John Temple for service with Sir John Byng's Fleet serving in the Baltic. Around January 1718 she was under the command of Commander Samuel Atkins as a fireship in the Mediterranean. She participated in the Battle of Passaro on 11 August 1718. In 1719, she fell under the command of Captain John Hubbard and remained in the Mediterranean. She was rearmed and rerated as a 20-gun sixth rate at this time. Upon her return, she was assigned as a quarantine guardship at the Nore under the command of Captain John Feller in April 1721. On 20 October 1721 she was dismantled at Sheerness with the intent for rebuilding.

=== Rebuild as sixth rate Sheerness 1721–1724 ===
She was ordered rebuilt at Sheerness Dockyard under the guidance of Master Shipwright John Ward on 12 October 1721. Her keel was laid on 24 October 1721 and launched on 1 May 1724. Her dimensions were a gundeck of 106 feet 1 inch (32.33 metres) with a keel of 87 feet 10 inches (26.77 metres) for tonnage calculation with a breadth of 28 feet 4 inches (8.64 metres) and a depth of hold of 9 feet 2 inches (2.79 metres). Her builder's measure tonnage was calculated as 3755/94 tons (burthen). He gun armament was in accordance with the 1719 Establishment for a 20-gun sixth rate consisting of twenty 6-pounder guns on the upper Deck (UD). She was completed at a cost of £2,952.11.6.75d (Note: A total cost accounting for inflation of approximately £549,500 in today's money) to build.

=== Service 1727–1744 ===
She was commissioned in 1727 under the command of Captain Daniel Morris for service with Sir John Norris's Fleet in the Baltic. After returning, she was assigned to South Carolina in 1728. Upon Captain Morris's death on 11 July 1728, he was succeeded by Captain George Anderson. She was ordered home in 1730. In 1731, she was under Captain George Berkeley for service in Jamaica. She returned home and was paid off in June 1733. She underwent a small repair costing £1,326.18.5d (Note: A total cost accounting for inflation of approximately £273,000 in today's money) between September and December 1733 at Portsmouth. She was recommissioned in 1734 under the command of Captain Lord Aubrey Beauclerk for service in the Mediterranean. Upon her return she underwent a great repair costing £3,171.3.1d (Note: A total cost accounting for inflation of approximately £591,600 in today's money) from February to April 1736. In February 1738 she was under Captain Charles Watson for service at Newfoundland followed by service in the Mediterranean during 1739/40. In May 1741 Captain Henry Godsalve was her commander until 1744.

== Disposition ==
Under AO 6 September 1744, she was sold at Sheerness for £1,003 (Note: A total cost accounting for inflation of approximately £187,100 in today's money) on 27 September 1744.
