= Hester Davenport =

Hester Davenport (23 March 1642 – 16 November 1717) was a leading actress with the Duke's Company under the management of Sir William Davenant. Among the earliest English actresses, she was best known as "that faire & famous Comoedian call'd Roxalana," as diarist John Evelyn put it after seeing her on 9 January 1661/2. Her career ended when she married Aubrey de Vere, 20th Earl of Oxford (1627-1703) in 1662 or 1663. The couple had a son in 1664. Oxford soon deserted Davenport and his son Aubrey, marrying a fellow nobleman's daughter in January 1672. In a 1686 church court case, Oxford admitted the marriage ceremony with Davenport had been a sham.

== Early career ==
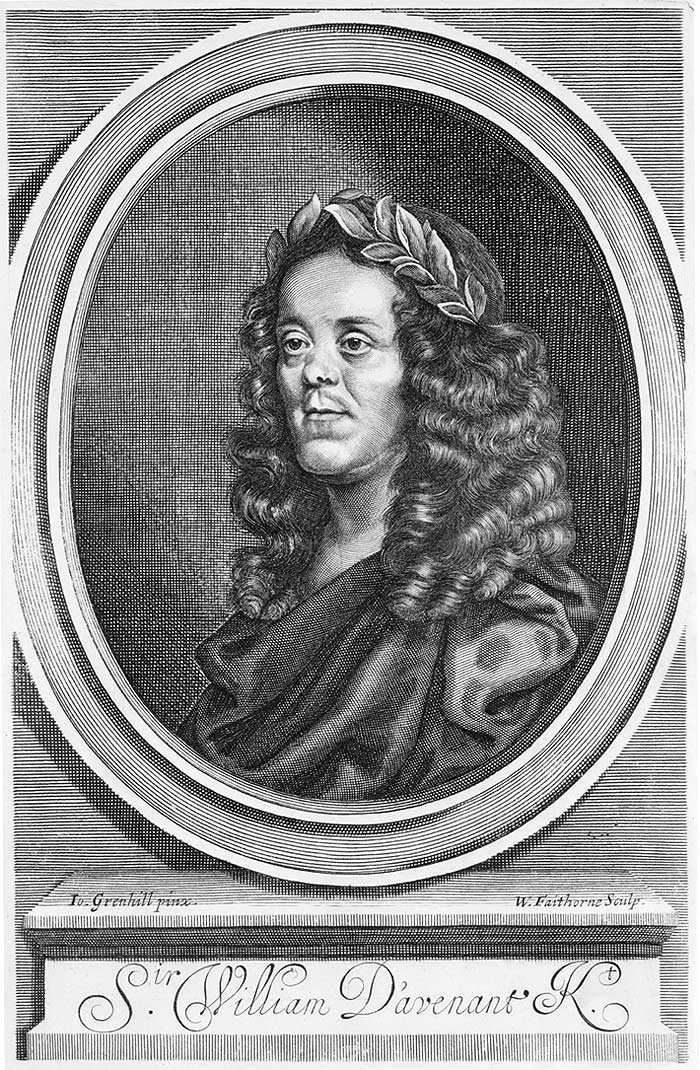
In 1660 Davenport joined the Duke's Company under the management of Sir William Davenant

By late 1600, Davenport and three other actresses had joined the Duke's Company of actors in London's Field Inn, London. They were protégées of Lady and Sir William Davenant. The Duke's Company was under his management. In 1661, Davenport appeared as Lady Ample alongside Davenant in his play The Wits. For him, she also played Gertrude in Hamlet, Evandra in Love and Honour and Clerora in The Bondman. The first well-known English actress, she was described as "a charming, graceful creature and one that acted to perfection." June 1661 saw her in what was to become her most famous role and one which was to be associated with her for years to come: Roxalana, in a revival of Davenant's The Siege of Rhodes, originally written in 1656, but rewritten to take advantage of the talents of the young actresses now in his Company.

The diarist Samuel Pepys, who had been pleased to see beautiful and talented women like Davenport playing the female roles previously given to young men, was lamenting the loss of 'Roxalana' by 18 February 1662.'

== The Earl of Oxford ==
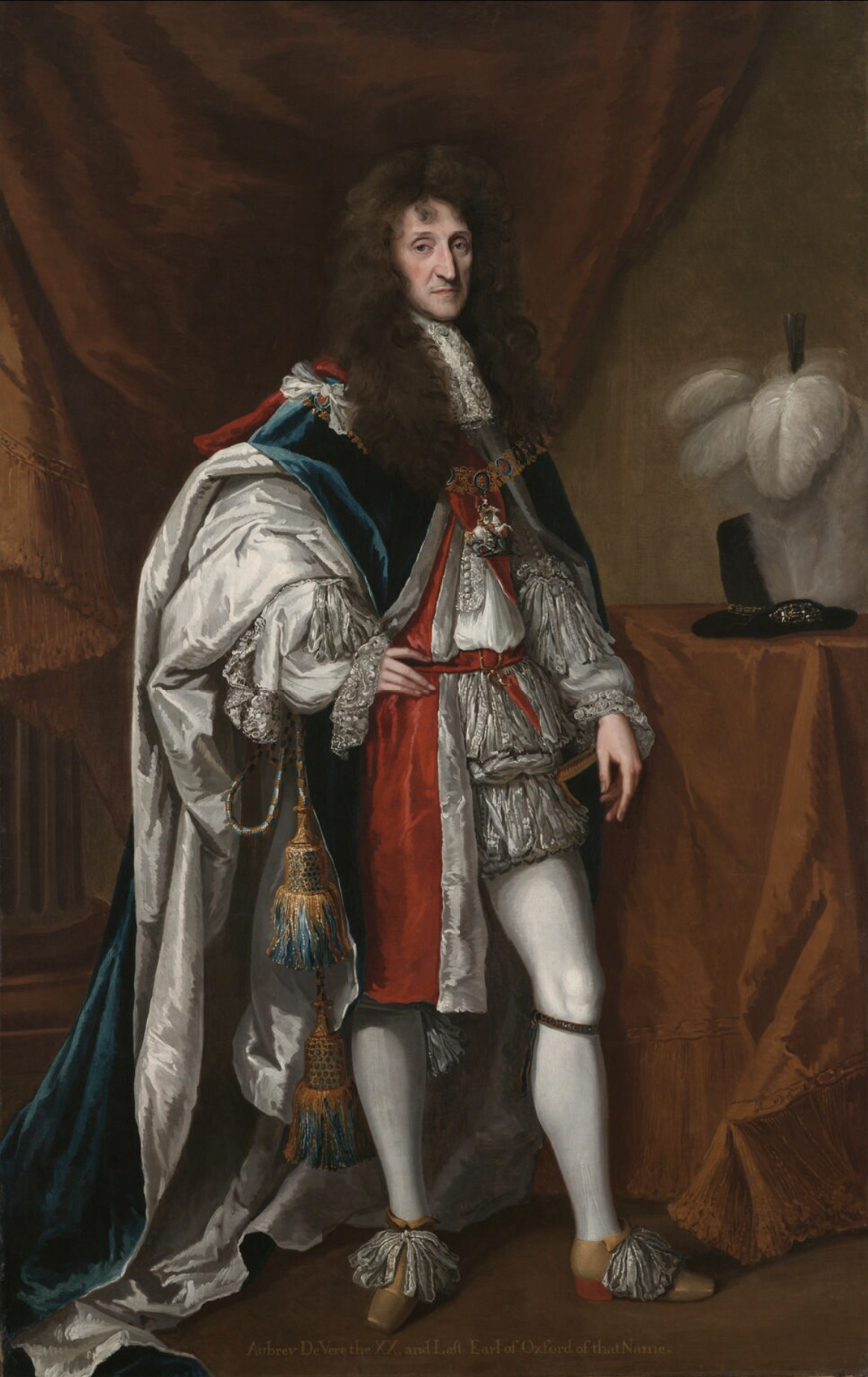
Aubrey de Vere, 20th Earl of Oxford, Davenport's husband

Aubrey de Vere, 20th Earl of Oxford became infatuated with Davenport, pursuing her ardently for nine months, but she rejected his advances and returned his gifts. In 18 February 1662 Pepys recorded in his Diary that Roxalana was no longer performing on the stage, the supposition being that she was by then living with Oxford. Davenport had refused to become the Oxford mistress, but accepted his proposal of marriage. In the early 1660s, the couple married. (Fraser gives the year as 1662 or 1663; the earlier year seems likelier, given Pepys's Diary entry.) The small wedding "took place in the dining room of a chandler’s shop in a somewhat insalubrious street in the vicinity of what is now London's Northumberland Avenue." A man in the garb of a clergyman officiated, and "Davenport wore a white satin gown decorated with silver ribbons."

Davenport and de Vere lived as husband and wife, first in Drury Lane, then in Covent Garden where Hester became pregnant. The couple's son Aubrey de Vere was born on 17 April 1664 and baptized at St Paul's church in Covent Garden on 15 May. Oxford openly acknowledged that he was the father of the child, granted a pension to Davenport, and took responsibility for her debts. Dr. Ruth Pauley writing for 'The History of Parliament' notes that 'Hester Davenport seems to have been acknowledged as countess of Oxford.' On 4 January 1665, Samuel Pepys paid a visit to the chaotic home of the couple and recorded in his Diary that 'his Lordshipp was in bed at past 10 a-clock: and Lord help us, so rude a dirty family I never saw in my life.'

Sometime between 1665 and 1670, Diana Kirke became de Vere's public mistress. The daughter of George Kirke, groom of the bedchamber to Charles II, Kirke became de Vere's second legal wife in January 1672. The Anglican service was held at Whitehall with Oxford's chaplain officiating. Davenport filed a church court case against de Vere. When it was heard in 1686, he defended himself against Davenport's charge of bigamy by admitting he had staged their wedding: 'An action in the church courts in the mid 1680s confirmed that Hester Davenport and Oxford had indeed gone through some sort of ceremony but failed to establish that it had been performed by a genuine clergyman. Hester Davenport was thus unable to prove that she was anything other than a discarded mistress.' The man who led the service 'in a Minister's Habit' was likely one of Oxford's servants, a groom or a trumpeter, in disguise.

Although Davenport lost the case, she didn't accept the result. She continued to use her married name, insisted their son was legitimate, and attempted in vain to establish him as the heir to the earldom. Oxford's only son with Kirke died as an infant. Though Aubrey de Vere survived his father, he was unable to inherit his father's title, and no "suitable" claimant came forward. Oxford, one of England's oldest noble lines, began when Aubrey de Vere, 1st Earl of Oxford, received the title from Empress Matilda in 1141. It ended with the death of the ignoble Aubrey de Vere, 20th Earl, in 1703. His body was buried in St John the Evangelist's chapel at Westminster Abbey, but his grave has no monument or marker.

Popular opinion saw Davenport as an innocent victim who'd been duped into a sham marriage. Though it has been claimed that Davenport appealed to Charles II for support and received a pension of 1000 crowns a year, there is no evidence for such claims.

== Later years ==
Following her liaison with Aubrey de Vere, Davenport remained single, as befitted her conviction that she was married. On de Vere's death in March 1703, she referred to herself as the ‘dowager Countess of Oxford.' On 25 July 1703, she married the Flemish merchant Peter Hoet of Gray's Inn. On 4 June 1708, her son Aubury de Vere was buried at the Church of St Andrew in Holborn as 'Earl of Oxford, from Grays Inn.' Davenport's husband Peter Hoet died in 1717. On 16 November 1717, the day of her death, she signed her will as 'Hester Oxford,' bequeathing her estate to friends, rather than her surviving sister. Hester died just hours after asserting once more than she was Oxford's rightful wife. She was buried on 20 November at St Anne's church in Soho, London.
