= Aubrey de Vere, 20th Earl of Oxford =

English army officer and magistrate (1627–1703)

The Right Honourable The Earl of Oxford KG PC
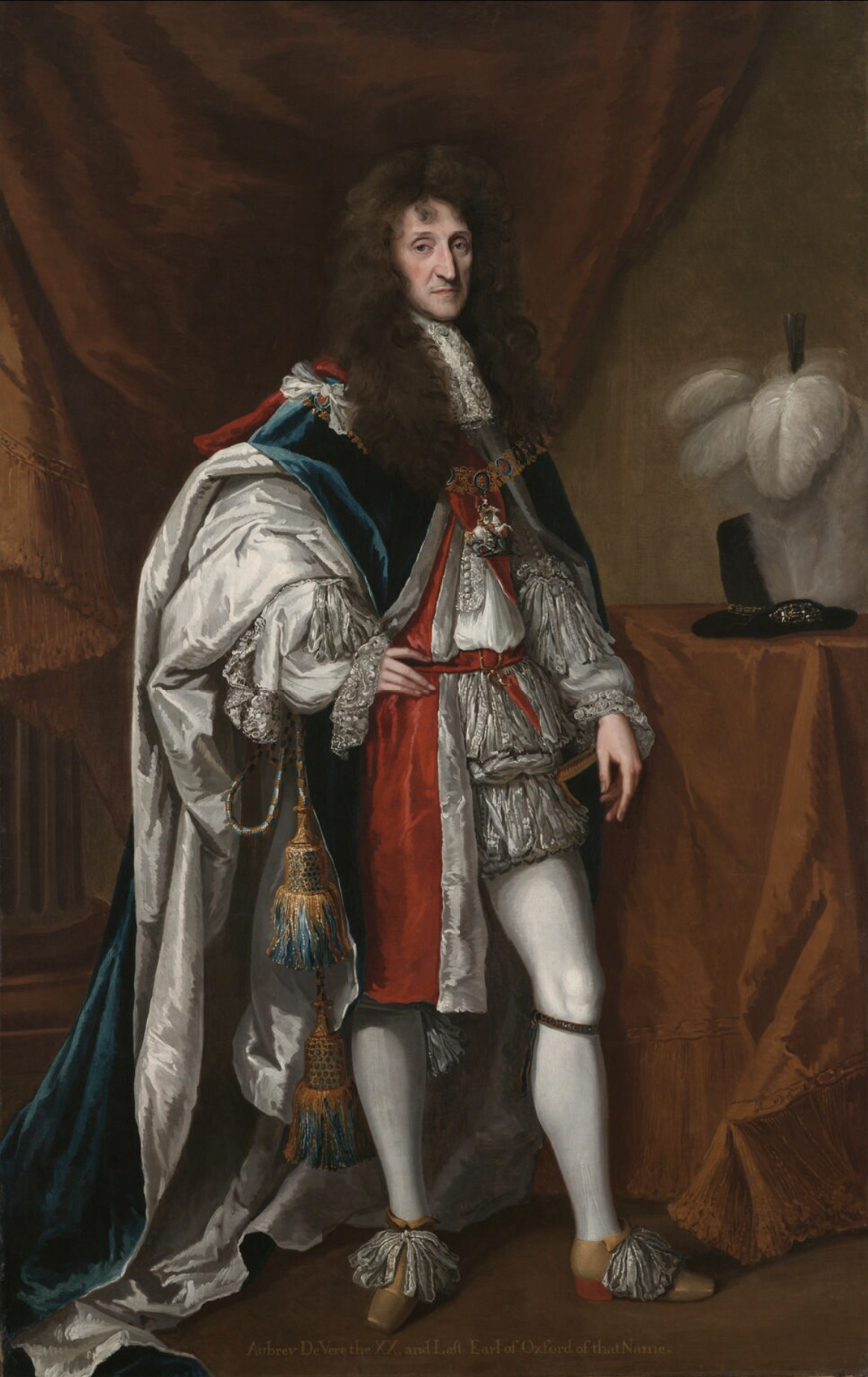
- Portrait by Godfrey Kneller, c. 1690
- Born: 28 February 1627; England
- Died: 12 March 1703 (aged 76); England
- Spouse(s): Anne Bayning Diana Kirke (m. 1672)
- Children: 6, including Diana
- Parents: Robert de Vere, 19th Earl of Oxford (father); Beatrix van Hemmend (mother)

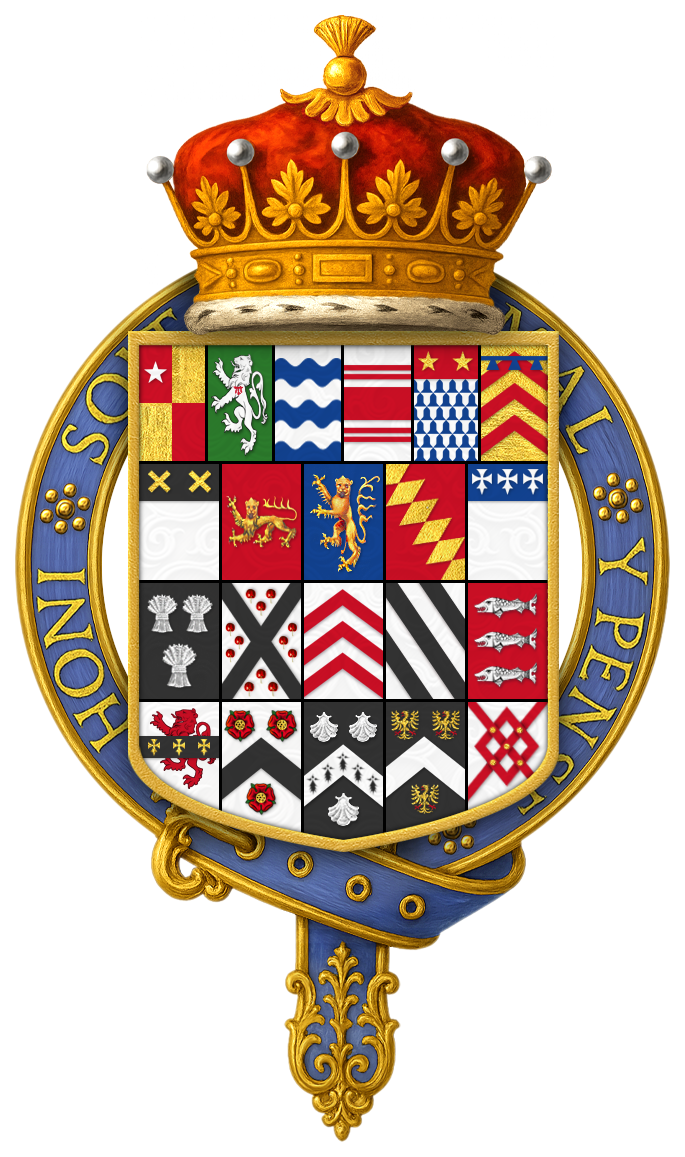
Coat of arms of Aubrey de Vere, 20th Earl of Oxford, KG

Aubrey de Vere, 20th Earl of Oxford, KG, PC (28 February 1627 – 12 March 1703) was an English army officer and magistrate who fought on the Royalist side during the English Civil War.

== Biography ==
He was the son of Robert de Vere, 19th Earl of Oxford and his wife Beatrice (or Bauck) van Hemmema. He was educated in Friesland in the Netherlands after his father was mortally wounded at the Capture of Maastricht in 1632 when de Vere was only six years old. Years later he joined the English Regiment of Foot, serving on the continent with the Dutch. He remained in Holland during the English Civil War, but returned to England in 1651 an ardent royalist. He was involved in a succession of plots, and was imprisoned in the Tower of London for allegedly plotting against Oliver Cromwell, and interned without trial. On release he joined Sir George Booth's rising in 1659 against Richard Cromwell's regime.

He went with five other peers to petition The Hague for the return of King Charles II in early May 1660. Hoping but failing to become Lord Chamberlain, he was offered the Colonelcy of the Royal Horse Guards. As a favourite of royal mistress Barbara Villiers, Duchess of Cleveland, he courted the Earl of Bristol's daughter, whose family were in favour at court. The daughter married Robert Spencer, 2nd Earl of Sunderland, a Secretary of State, but he lobbied the king on Oxford's behalf. Oxford was made Lord Lieutenant of Essex and a Knight of the Garter.

Censorious Whigs like Samuel Pepys deplored seeing Oxford wearing his Garter regalia in public, and there was a rumour that he had married an actress in secret. The actress was Hester Davenport (1642–1717) and the wedding supposedly took place on a Sunday morning in 1662 or 1663 in a chandler's shop in Harts Horn Lane, London. She had a son Aubrey (1664–1708) from this union. The earl successfully brought a lawsuit in 1686 to refute her claims.

Despite being a Cavalier, he was a tolerant Protestant, and permitted Quakers and Puritans to join the regiment. He was a friend of Charles II's illegitimate son, the Duke of Monmouth. Oxford raised a regiment of horse from 1684 onwards, just as the Life Guards were being withdrawn from Dunkirk. They were properly the Royal Regiment of Horse, but were known by the colour of the uniforms as Oxford's Blues because he was the regiment's colonel. Royalist volunteers added strength to this Protestant regiment. It was Charles II's policy to expand the army beyond the core that he had inherited. Oxford gained the disapproval at court of the Duke of Buckingham, who had declared undying enmity. Oxford replied that he "neither cared for his friendship nor feared for his hatred."

"...a troop of horse, excellently mounted, of the Royal Regiment of my Lord Aubrey de Vere, Earl of Oxford...inspecting every file of the company, the officers of which wore a red sash with gold tassels.", wrote Prince Cosmo of Tuscany on a visit to London in 1668. Oxford was present at the first Army Board on 5 August 1670, chaired by the Duke of York, the king's brother who later succeeded him as King James II. On 5 July 1685 Sir Francis Compton was promoted to command the regiment. Oxford wanted the post for himself but was prevented from taking it by the King. Oxford was responsible for kitting out his regiment, and ordered a standard blue uniform from a woollen draper, Mr Munnocks of The Strand, Middlesex, whose son was killed in the service.

Oxford as Lord Lieutenant of Essex was responsible for raising troops in the county, but refused James II's order to appoint Roman Catholics to public offices. In February 1688 he told King James "I will stand by Your Majesty against all enemies to the last drop of my blood. But this is a matter of conscience and I cannot comply." He was deprived of his offices. Months later he took the side of William of Orange against James II in the Glorious Revolution. He was restored to his titles and the colonelcy of The Blues, and exempted the Commission of Inspection by the Convention Parliament of April 1689. The Secretary at War, William Blathwayt, wrote asking for details of all officers removed by absolutism. On 1 February 1689 Oxford and Compton lobbied Parliament to pass a vote of thanks to the army for the Whig constitution "...testified their sturdy adherence to the Protestant religion and being instrumental in delivering this country from popery and slavery."

He died in 1703 without surviving male issue, making the title extinct. His daughter Lady Diana de Vere married Charles Beauclerk, Duke of St Albans, another illegitimate son of Charles II.

== Family ==
Oxford's first wife was Ann Bayning, a daughter of Paul Bayning, 2nd Viscount Bayning. Westminster Abbey's commemoration of de Vere notes that Ann was 10 when she was married. (Commoners rarely married before age 21.) Ann was buried in the Abbey on 27 September 1659. The couple had no children.

In the early 1660s, Oxford began pursuing one of London's most famous actresses, Hester Davenport (23 March 1642 – 16 November 1717). Davenport was a leading actress with the Duke's Company under the management of Sir William Davenant. After seeing her on stage on 9 January 1661/2, diarist John Evelyn described her as "faire & famous Comoedian." Davenport refused to be Oxford's mistress and returned his gifts, but agreed to marry him in a small ceremony held in 1662 or 1663, ending a "promising" career. The couple's son, Aubrey de Vere, was born on 17 April 1664 and baptised at St Paul's church in Covent Garden on 15 May. The Earl openly acknowledged that he was Aubrey's father, granted Davenport a pension, and took responsibility for her debts. Writing for "The History of Parliament," Dr Ruth Pauley notes that "Hester Davenport seems to have been acknowledged as countess of Oxford."

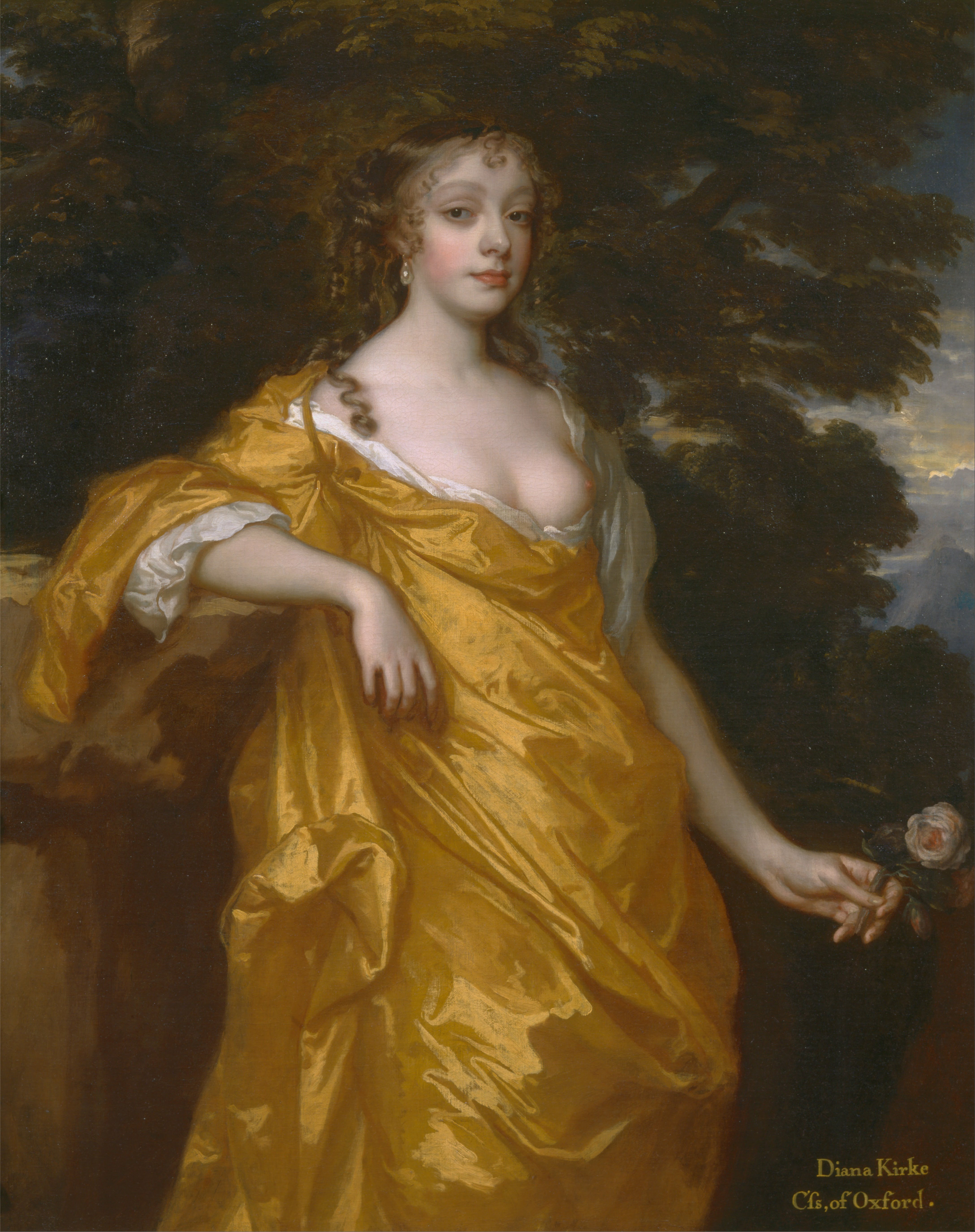
Diana de Vere (née Kirke), 20th Countess of Oxford by Peter Lely

Sometime between 1665 and 1670, de Vere began an affair with Diana Kirke, daughter of Anne Killigrew and George Kirke, groom of the bedchamber to Charles II and granddaughter of Aurelian Townshend. "Following a public spat" with Davenport, Kirke became de Vere's "public mistress." A sultry portrait of Diana Kirke painted by Sir Peter Lely during this period shows her standing in a swirling gold gown, her left breast exposed, her left arm hanging seductively by her side, a rose in her hand. Lely paints the centre of the rose's folded petals and the tip of Diana's bare breast from the same palette.

In January 1672, Oxford married Diana Kirke. The Anglican service was held at Whitehall with Oxford's chaplain officiating. In a church court case brought by Hester Davenport and heard in 1686, de Vere defended himself against the charge of bigamy by admitting that he had staged their wedding. The court concluded that "Davenport and Oxford had indeed gone through some sort of ceremony but failed to establish that it had been performed by a genuine clergyman. Hester Davenport was thus unable to prove that she was anything other than a discarded mistress." The man who officiated, dressed as a clergyman, was probably one of Oxford's servants, a groom or a trumpeter, in disguise. Davenport had assumed she was legally married. Though she lost the case, she continued to use her married name and fought to have her son declared legitimate. She remained single until de Vere died.

De Vere had five children with Diana Kirke:

1. Charles (Karl), born 22 Nov 1675; baptised 9 Dec 1675, St. Martin in the Fields, Westminster; died as an infant.
2. Charlotta, born 24 Aug 1673; baptised 13 Sept 1673, St. Martin in the Fields, Westminster; no further record.
3. Diana, born c.1679; died 15 January 1742, Windsor Castle; became Diana Beauclerk, Duchess of St. Albans, when she married Charles Beauclerk, 1st Duke of St Albans, son of Charles II and Nell Gwynn.
4. Mary, died unmarried; buried 1725, Westminster Abbey.
5. Henrietta, died unmarried 22 Sept 1730 at 48; buried 1730, Westminster Abbey.

De Vere was buried in St. John the Evangelist's chapel, Westminster Abbey on 22 March 1703. His body lies near the monument to his kinsman Sir Francis Vere, "but has no monument or marker." Diana Kirke was buried in the Abbey on 19 April 1719. Aubrey de Vere survived his father, but because his father declared him illegitimate, he was unable to inherit his father's title. No "suitable" claimant came forward, and one of the oldest titles in the peerage of England came to its end. Aubrey de Vere, 1st Earl of Oxford, received his title from the Empress Matilda in 1141. With the death of Aubrey de Vere, 20th Earl of Oxford, the "title became extinct."

== Notes ==
Legal offices
Preceded by Vacant (The Protectorate)	Justice in Eyre south of the Trent; 1660–1673	Succeeded by The Duke of Monmouth
Military offices
New regiment	Colonel of The Royal Regiment of Horse; 1661–1688	Succeeded by The Duke of Berwick
Preceded by Earl of Arran	Colonel of The Royal Regiment of Horse; 1688–1703	Succeeded by The Duke of Northumberland
Honorary titles
English Interregnum	Lord Lieutenant of Essex jointly with The Duke of Albemarle 1675–1687; 1660–1687	Succeeded by The Lord Petre
Preceded by The Lord Petre	Lord Lieutenant of Essex; 1688–1703	Succeeded by The Lord Guilford
Peerage of England
Preceded by Robert de Vere	Earl of Oxford; 1632–1703	Dormant
