= Edward Stanley, 19th Earl of Derby =

British peer and landowner

The Right Honourable The Earl of Derby DL
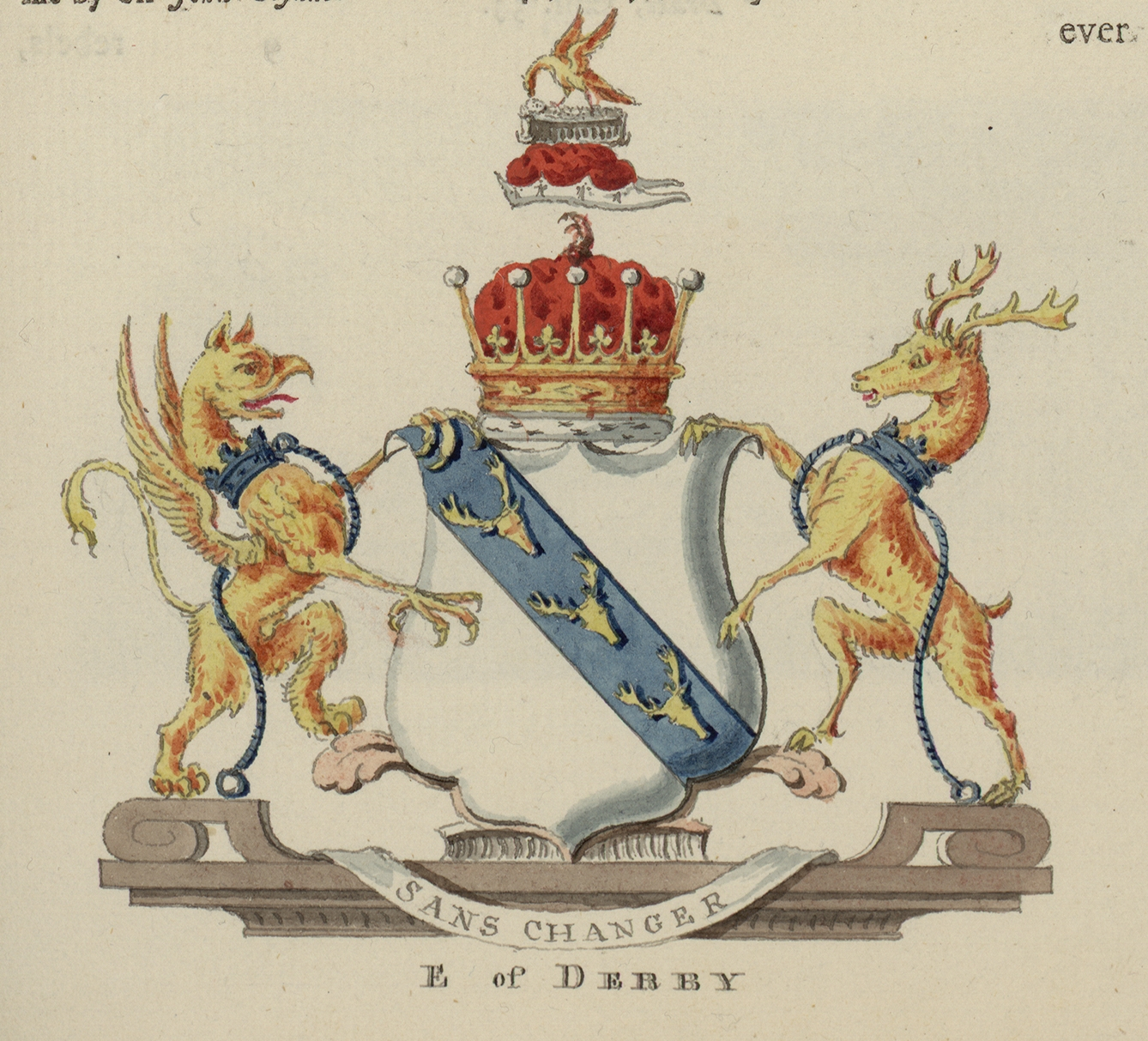
- Arms of the Earls of Derby
- Born: Edward Richard William Stanley; 10 October 1962 (age 64)
- Spouse: Caroline Neville (m. 1995)
- Issue: 3
- Parents: The Hon. Hugh Stanley; Rose Birch
- Occupation: Peer, landowner

Edward Richard William Stanley, 19th Earl of Derby, DL (born 10 October 1962) is a British hereditary peer and landowner.

He was a member of the House of Lords from 1994 to 1999.

== Early life ==
Edward Stanley (known to friends as "Teddy") was born in 1962, the son of Hugh Stanley (1926–1971), the youngest son of Edward Stanley, Lord Stanley (died 1938), and his wife Rose Birch. He is a great-great-grandson of Frederick Stanley, 16th Earl of Derby, who served as Governor General of Canada and gave the country the Stanley Cup.

He was educated at Eton College and Sandhurst, then in 1982 was commissioned as a junior officer into the Grenadier Guards. After leaving the army, he attended the Royal Agricultural College, Cirencester, to study farming and estate management.

== Career ==
Stanley was a merchant banker with Robert Fleming & Company between 1987 and 2001.

In 1994, he inherited the earldom of Derby and other peerages on the death of his uncle Edward Stanley, 18th Earl of Derby. He also inherited the Knowsley Hall estate, with its Knowsley Safari Park and the Stanley House Stud at Hatchfield Farm. He also has a family home in Westminster.

Derby is president of the Liverpool Chamber of Commerce, serves as a member of the University of Liverpool Council (receiving an honorary doctorate (Hon. LLD) from the Liverpool University in 2008) and is one of seven trustees of the foundation which funds bursaries to Cameron House pre-prep and prep school in the Royal Borough of Kensington and Chelsea, London. Lord Stanley was appointed a deputy lieutenant of Merseyside in 1999, serving alongside Frank Field and Mark Blundell among others. He is also the President of the Liverpool College Foundation, a foundation linked to the school of which his predecessor the 14th Earl of Derby was a founder.

For the coronation of Charles III, Derby was made the Vice Admiral of Lancashire. The position had been held by previous Earls of Derby going back to 1569. Prior to this appointment, Derby was an honorary Captain in the Royal Naval Reserve.

== Knowsley ==
Derby's Knowsley estate has residential properties in the rural parishes of Knowsley, Eccleston, Rainford, Bickerstaffe, and Ormskirk. It also rents out commercial properties at the Stanley Grange Business Village, converted from a range of Victorian farm buildings on the estate and opened in June 2013.

The Grade II* listed Knowsley Hall, with its 2,500 acres of parkland, has been used as the filming location for several television programmes and films, including Boys from the Blackstuff – 'Yosser's Story' (1982), Apparitions (2008), The Liver Birds (2007) as well as television soap operas, Hollyoaks and Coronation Street. In 2008, the house received a five-star gold rating for accommodation from inspectors at VisitEngland, the only stately home to be so rated. In 2010, Lord Derby announced his 'Green' policies for the estate, which included conservation and generation of efficient energy usage.

In November 2024, Derby argued against the imposition of inheritance tax on farmland, as proposed in the first budget of a new Labour government. He said “Taking 20 per cent of a business away every generation is just a shockingly awful concept for a government that wants growth. It’s going to kill off farming businesses…selling land would make farms less viable”.

== Thoroughbred horse racing ==
The Epsom Derby was named after the 12th Earl of Derby, while The Oaks was named after the 12th Earl's house near Epsom. The Derby family can trace its horse-racing heritage back to the 5th Earl of Derby in the sixteenth century.

Derby's maternal grandmother, Catherine, was a well-known racehorse trainer in Wiltshire notably College House, Lambourn, from where she sent out The Schweppes Gold Trophy winner Ra Nova, among others.

Derby usually has one or two horses in training each year from Hatchfield stud farm, which is managed by his younger brother, Peter Stanley, and houses a small number of brood mares. Derby's policy is to sell his colts and race the fillies. He owned Ouija Board, winner of seven Grade 1 races, including The Oaks, the Irish Oaks and the Breeders' Cup Filly & Mare Turf in 2004, and the last-named race again in 2006. Ouija Board also won the Prince of Wales's Stakes at Royal Ascot in June 2006. She was third in the Japan Cup following that last win, and was retired after going lame before her intended final start in the Hong Kong Vase at Sha Tin in December 2006. Ouija Board won over three million pounds in prize money, and Derby has published a book about her, Ouija Board: A Mare in a Million.

Derby's proposal to build 1,200 houses and a large industrial estate on historic stud land at Hatchfield in Newmarket, Suffolk, was met with opposition from local residents, businesses and the area's largest employers, including Tattersalls, the Jockey Club, Newmarket Racecourse, some of Newmarket's elected councillors, leading trainers, and the local residents' group Save Historic Newmarket.

== Personal life ==
Lord Derby married The Honourable Caroline Neville, a daughter of Robin Neville, 10th Baron Braybrooke, on 21 October 1995 at the Church of St. Mary the Virgin in Saffron Walden. The couple have three children:

- Lady Henrietta Mary Rose Stanley (b. 6 February 1997). She married Alexander "Sasha" Reviakin on 4 July 2026 at Knowsley Hall.
- Edward John Robin Stanley, Lord Stanley (b. 21 April 1998), heir apparent to the earldom
- Hon. Oliver Henry Hugh Stanley (b. 26 April 2002)

The elder son, Lord Stanley, is a godson of Andrew Mountbatten-Windsor,, the former prince and Duke of York, and was Page of Honour to Queen Elizabeth II between 2008 and 2012, appearing in three Garter services and four State Openings of Parliament. He held the Garter around the leg of Prince William during his installation as 1000th Knight of the Garter.

== Arms ==
Coat of arms of Edward Stanley, 19th Earl of Derby
Crest On a chapeau gules turned up ermine an eagle, wings extended, or, preying on an infant in its cradle proper, swaddled gules, the cradle laced or. Escutcheon Argent, on a bend azure three stags' heads caboshed or. Supporters Dexter, a griffin, wings elevated; sinister, a stag, each or, and ducally collared with line reflexed over the back azure. Motto Sans changer (Without changing).

== See also ==
- Baron Stanley of Alderley
- Stanley baronets

Peerage of England
Preceded by Edward Stanley	Earl of Derby; 1994–present	Incumbent; Heir apparent: Edward Stanley
Honorary titles
Preceded by Vacant	Vice Admiral of Lancashire; 2023–present	Incumbent
