= John Petre, 18th Baron Petre =

British peer

The Right Honourable The Lord Petre KCVO DL

Lord Lieutenant of Essex
- In office 16 December 2002 – 4 August 2017
- Monarch: Elizabeth II
- Preceded by: The Lord Braybrooke
- Succeeded by: Jennifer Tolhurst

Personal details
- Born: John Patrick Lionel Petre; 4 August 1942 (age 83)
- Spouse: Marcia Gwendolyn Plumpton (after 1965)
- Relations: Lionel Petre, 16th Baron Petre (grandfather)
- Children: 3
- Parent(s): Joseph Petre, 17th Baron Petre; Marguerite Eileen Hamilton
- Education: Eton College
- Alma mater: Trinity College, Oxford

John Patrick Lionel Petre, 18th Baron Petre, KCVO, DL (born 4 August 1942) is a British peer and landowner who was the Lord Lieutenant of Essex, succeeding Robin Neville, 10th Baron Braybrooke in October 2002. He is the 18th Baron of the Petre family, an old recusant family.

== Early life ==
Petre was born on 4 August 1942, the only child of Joseph William Lionel Petre, 17th Baron Petre (1914–1989) and Marguerite Eileen (d. 2003), daughter of Ion Wentworth Hamilton, of Westwood, Nettlebed, Oxfordshire. His father served in World War II as a 2nd Lt. in the Coldstream Guards and as a Capt. in the 5th Battalion, Essex Regiment. His father was the eldest child and only son of Lionel Petre, 16th Baron Petre, and his wife Catherine Boscawen, and succeeded to the title Lord Petre at only fifteen months old in 1915, after his father died in the First World War.

Petre was educated at Eton and rowed for Trinity College, Oxford.

== Career ==
Upon the death of his father on 1 January 1989, he succeeded as the 18th Baron Petre.

He held the office of Deputy Lieutenant (DL) of Essex in 1991. He was appointed Commander of the Most Venerable Order of the Hospital of St. John of Jerusalem (CStJ), and was appointed Knight Commander of the Royal Victorian Order (KCVO) in the 2016 Birthday Honours.

In December 2016, it was announced that Petre would deliver a Christmas message for the people of Essex. The message was initially broadcast on Essex TV on Christmas Eve.

== Personal life ==
On 16 September 1965, Petre was married to Marcia Gwendolyn Plumpton, the only daughter of Alfred Plumpton of Portsmouth. Together, they were the parents of three children. On 8 April 2024, Lady Petre died after a short illness, predeceased twenty years earlier by her youngest son, Mark.

Lord Petre lives near Chelmsford. His family estate is at Ingatestone Hall, where his son and heir apparent, Dominic, and his family live.

== See also ==
- Father Edward Petre
- John Petre, 1st Baron Petre

Honorary titles
Preceded by The Lord Braybrooke	Lord Lieutenant of Essex; 2002–2017	Succeeded by Jennifer Tolhurst
Peerage of England
Preceded by Joseph Petre	Baron Petre; 1989–present	Incumbent
