= William Petre (disambiguation) =

William Petre may refer to:

- William Petre (1505-1572), Secretary of State
- William Petre, 2nd Baron Petre (1575-1637)
- William Petre, 4th Baron Petre (1626-1684)
- William Petre, 11th Baron Petre (1793–1850)
- William Petre, 12th Baron Petre (1817–1884)
- William Petre, 13th Baron Petre (1847–1893)
- William Petre (diplomat), British diplomat on List of Ambassadors from the United Kingdom to the Holy See, resident at Rome 1844-1853
