= Countess of Derby =

The Countess of Derby usually refers to the wife or widow of an Earl of Derby, such as:

- Margaret Peverell, Countess of Derby (c. 1144–1154), English noblewoman
- Margaret Clifford, Countess of Derby (1540–1596), great-granddaughter of King Henry VII of England
- Alice Spencer, Countess of Derby (1559–1637), English noblewoman
- Elizabeth de Vere, Countess of Derby (1575–1627), English noblewoman and daughter of Edward de Vere, 17th Earl of Oxford
- Charlotte Stanley, Countess of Derby (1599–1664), English noblewoman famous for her role against the siege of Lathom House
- Elizabeth Smith-Stanley, Countess of Derby (1753–1797), English peeress
- Elizabeth Farren, Countess of Derby (c. 1759–1829), wife of Edward Smith-Stanley, 12th Earl of Derby
- Mary Catherine Stanley, Countess of Derby (1824–1900), English grande dame and political hostess
- Emma Caroline Smith-Stanley, Countess of Derby (died 1876), wife of Edward Smith-Stanley, 14th Earl of Derby
- Alice Stanley, Countess of Derby (1862–1957), wife of Edward Stanley, 17th Earl of Derby
- Caroline Stanley, Countess of Derby (born 1963), wife of Edward Stanley, 19th Earl of Derby
