= Thomas Petre, 6th Baron Petre =

Thomas Petre, 6th Baron Petre (1633–1706) was an English Catholic peer, the third son of Robert Petre, 3rd Baron Petre and Mary Brown. Inheriting the title from his elder brother, Petre held the title for 21 years.

Soon after Petre inherited his title, James II came to the throne. As both men were Catholics in a Protestant country, Petre soon found favour with the new King. His second cousin, Father Edward Petre, S.J., became advisor and confidant to James II. Edward was universally hated and reviled by the populace. In 1688, Thomas was appointed Lord Lieutenant of Essex and custos rotulorum for Essex. After James's flight in the Glorious Revolution, Petre was forced to resign when the militia refused to serve a Catholic.

After the Revolution, much of the vast revenues from the Petre estates were sent abroad to help maintain those institutions in continental Europe that provided education for Catholic Englishmen.

Thomas married Mary Clifton (died 1706), daughter of Sir Thomas Clifton, Bt of Lytham, Lancashire. He died on 10 January 1706, and was succeeded by his only son Robert, by which time the family had fully recovered financially. He also had a daughter Mary Petre, (1693–1713).

Honorary titles
Preceded by The Earl of Oxford; The Duke of Albemarle	Lord Lieutenant of Essex; 1688	Succeeded by The Earl of Oxford
Preceded by The Lord Maynard	Custos Rotulorum of Essex; 1688	Succeeded by The Earl of Oxford
Peerage of England
Preceded by John Petre	Baron Petre; 1684–1706	Succeeded by Robert Petre
