= Jennifer Tolhurst =

Lord-Lieutenant of Essex

Jennifer Tolhurst CVO
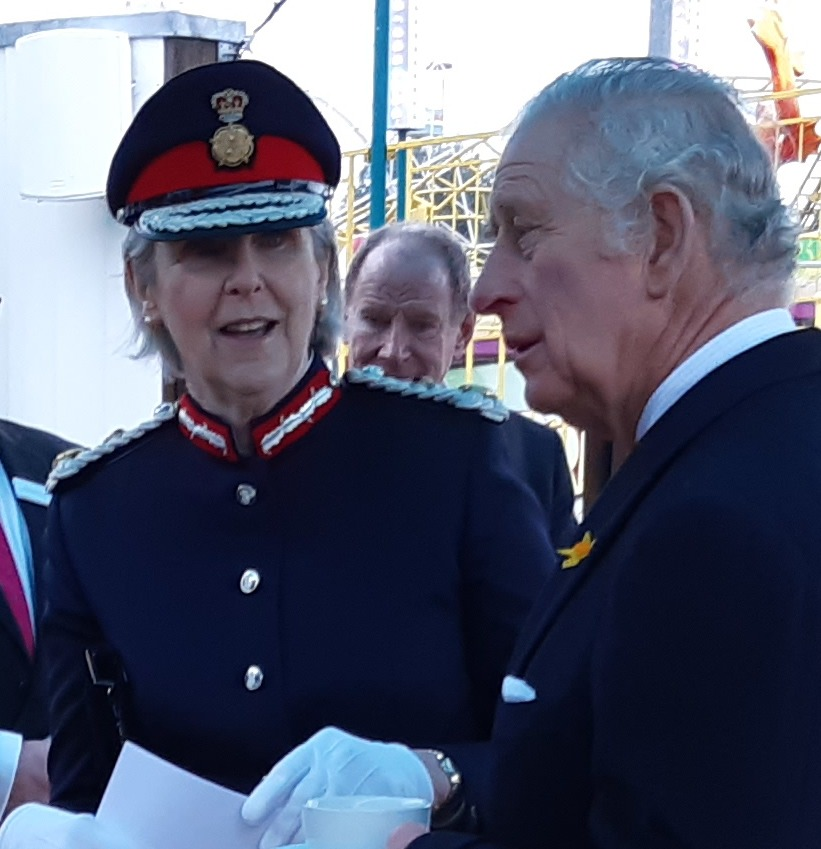
- Tolhurst (left) with the then Prince of Wales in March 2022

Lord Lieutenant of Essex
- Incumbent
- Assumed office 5 August 2017
- Monarchs: Elizabeth II; Charles III
- Preceded by: John Petre, 18th Baron Petre

High Sheriff of Essex
- In office 2005–2006
- Monarch: Elizabeth II

Personal details
- Born: Jennifer Mary Tolhurst; 1951 (age 74–75) Northern Ireland
- Spouse: Philip Tolhurst (m. 1972)
- Children: 3

Jennifer Mary Tolhurst CVO (born 1951) is the current Lord-Lieutenant of Essex. She has been in the position since 5 August 2017 and is the first woman to be appointed to the office in the county since it was established in the 1500s. She has previously worked for charities and has served as a magistrate.

== Biography ==
Tolhurst is the eldest daughter in a family of eight children. She was educated at a convent school in Kent. She also holds a BA Hons in Art and Design, which she studied as a mature student.

She started the Danbury and Little Baddow branch of the NSPCC and chaired the Prince's Youth Business Trust in Essex. She was a magistrate and vice chairman of the governors of New Hall School.

Tolhurst remains vice-president of the Essex Community Foundation, serves on Essex University Court, is an assessor for the Queen's Award for Voluntary Service and is vice-chairman of the Lord Chancellor's Advisory Committee. She was High Sheriff of Essex in 2005 to 2006.

Tolhurst was appointed Lord-Lieutenant of Essex in 2017. She succeeded Lord Petre, 18th Baron of the Petre family, whose ancestral family home is at Ingatestone Hall and who had held the position in Essex for the previous fifteen years. He stood down in August 2017 after turning 75 – the customary age of retirement for the Sovereign's representatives. She has been in the position since 5 August 2017 and is the first woman to be appointed to the office in the county since it was established in the 1500s.

In 2025, Tolhurst was appointed a patron of conservation charity the Essex Wildlife Trust.

== Personal life ==
Tolhurst lives in Danbury with her husband, Philip, whom she married in 1972. They have three grown-up children and eight grandchildren.

Tolhurst and her husband are keen sailors. She was the 4th hand on Queen Galadriel’s trip around the British Isles and is a trustee of The Cirdan Sailing Trust.
