= John Wastell =

English medieval architect

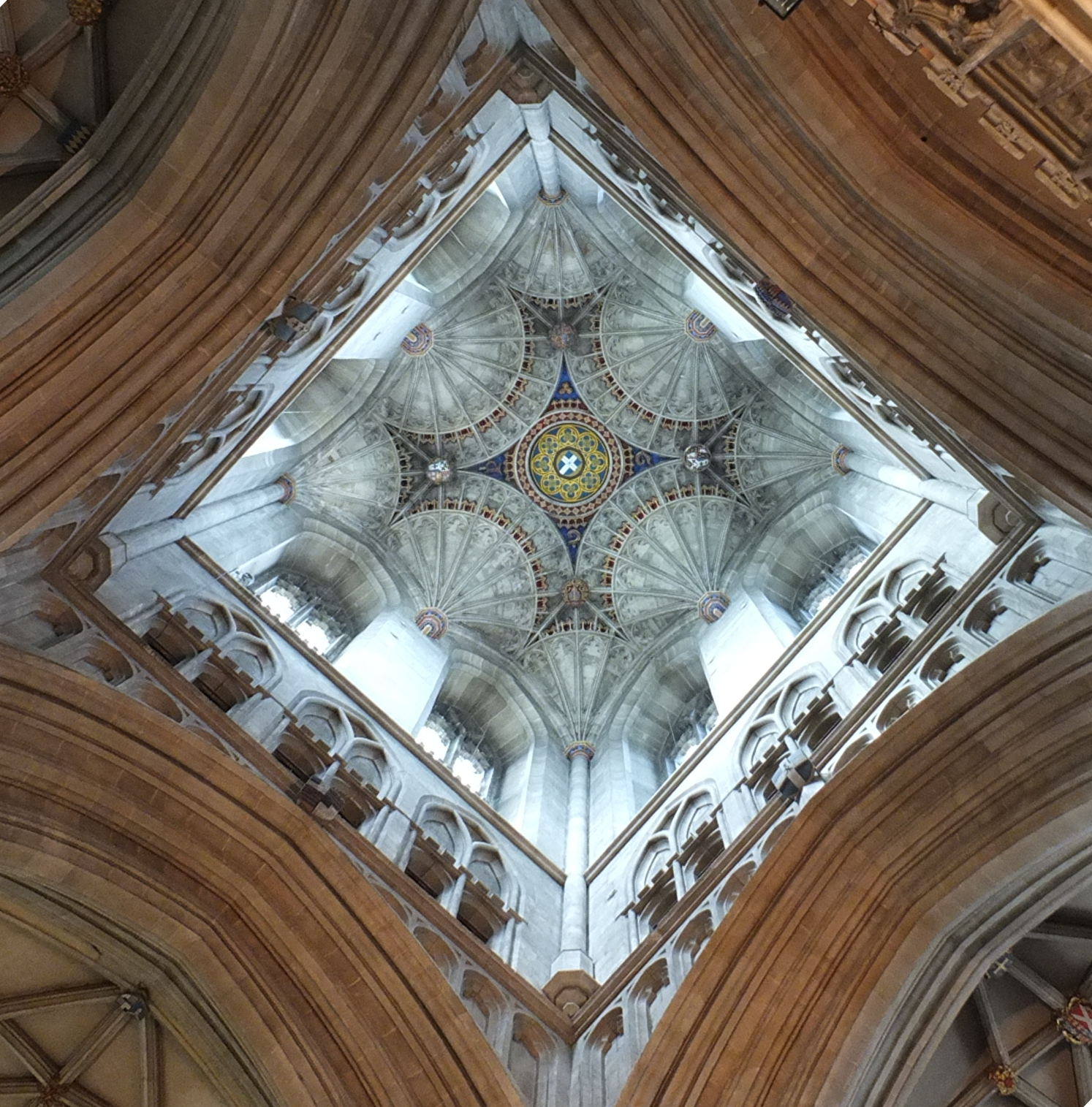
The fan vault in Bell Harry Tower

John Wastell (c. 1460 – c.1518) was an English gothic architect and master mason responsible for the fan vaulted ceiling and other features of King's College Chapel, Cambridge, the crossing tower (Bell Harry Tower) of Canterbury Cathedral, and sections of Peterborough Cathedral. He also worked on Bury St Edmunds Abbey. In addition he contributed to a number of churches in East Anglia, including St Mary's, Saffron Walden.

The choir of Manchester Cathedral has been attributed to him, but this suggestion is dismissed by biographer Francis Woodman; Pevsner's guide suggests it was the work of masons associated with his workshop.

== Gallery ==
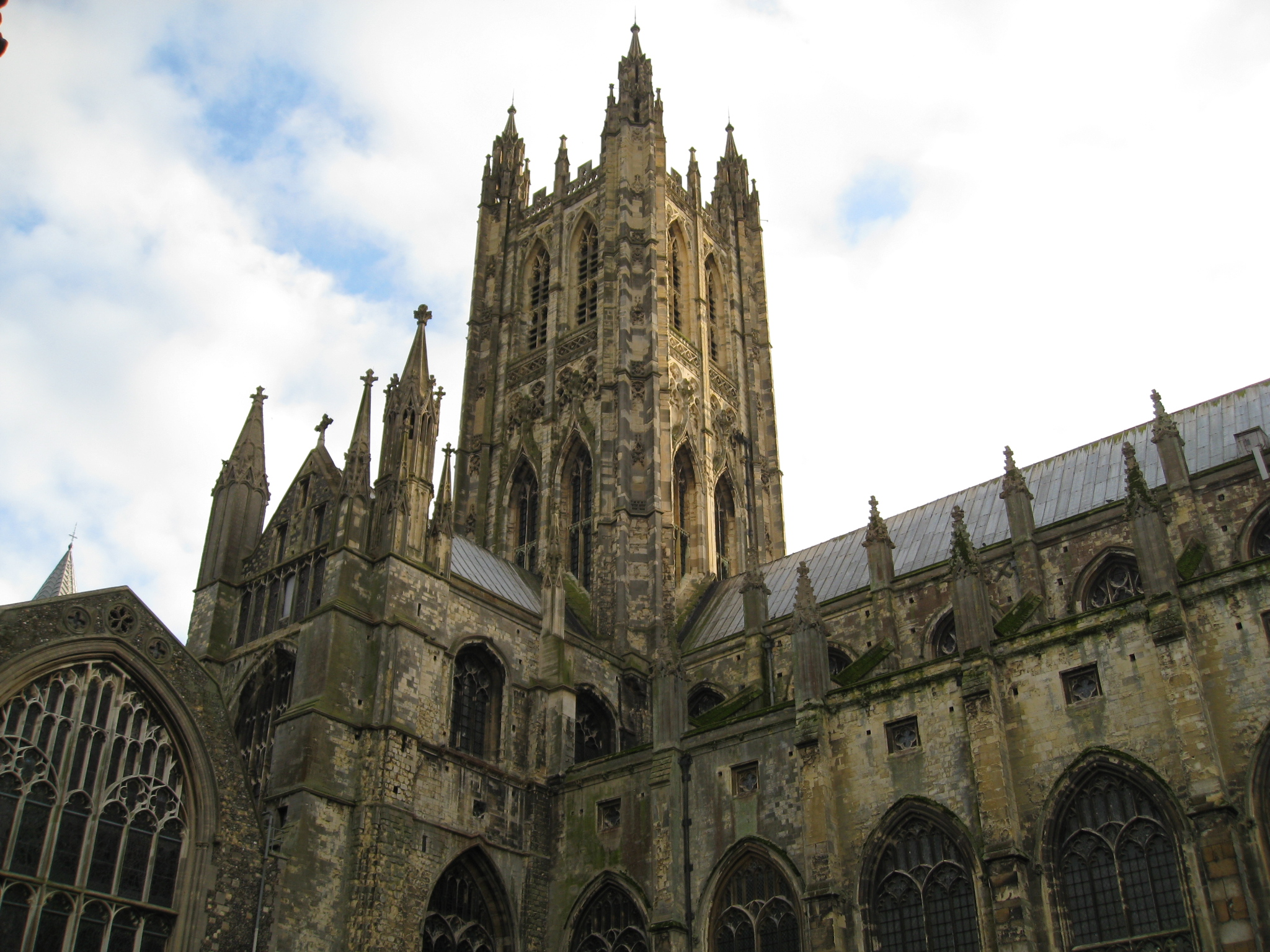
Bell Harry Tower Canterbury Cathedral

Strainer arches at the crossing of Canterbury Cathedral

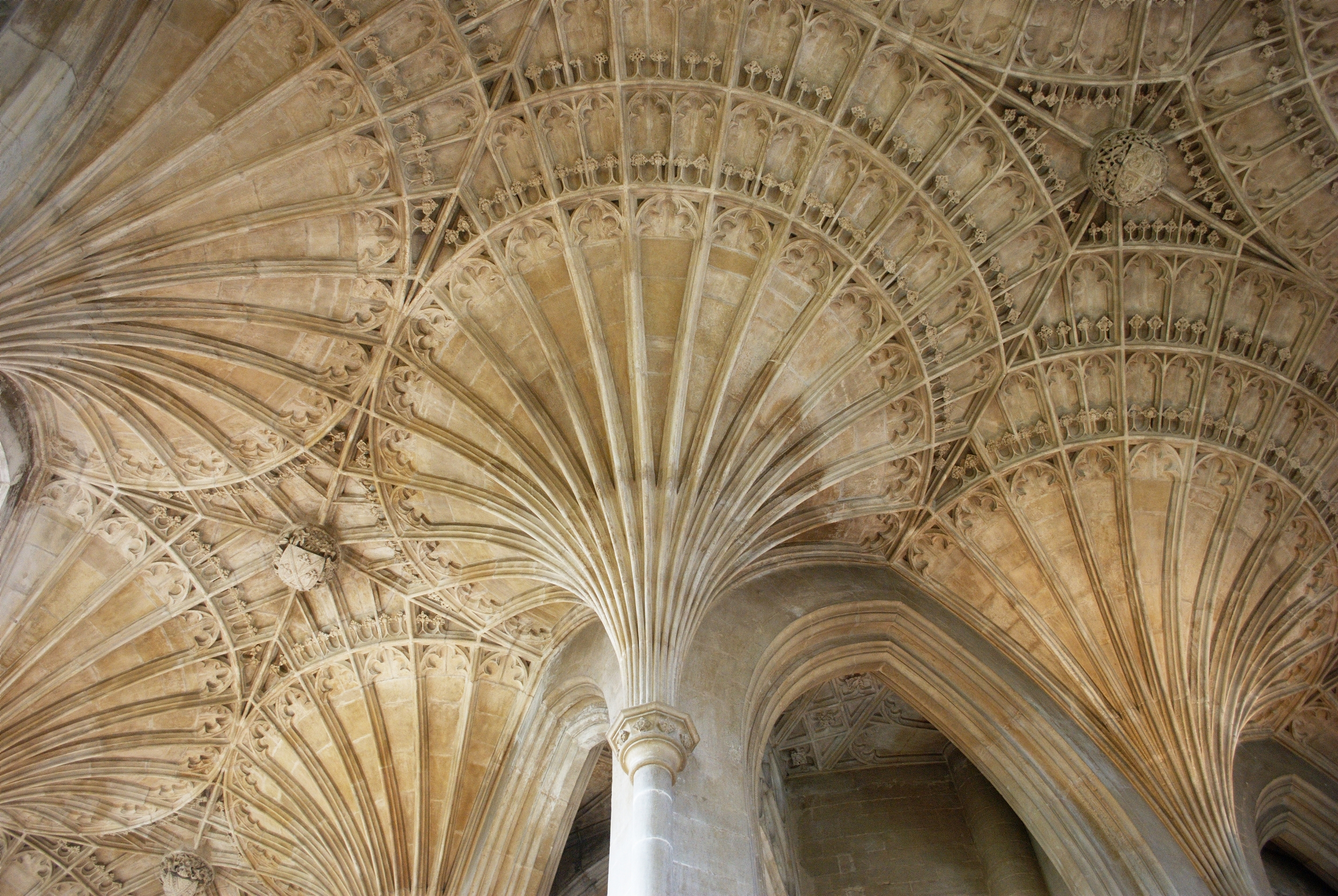
Fan vaulting in the retro-choir, Peterborough Cathedral

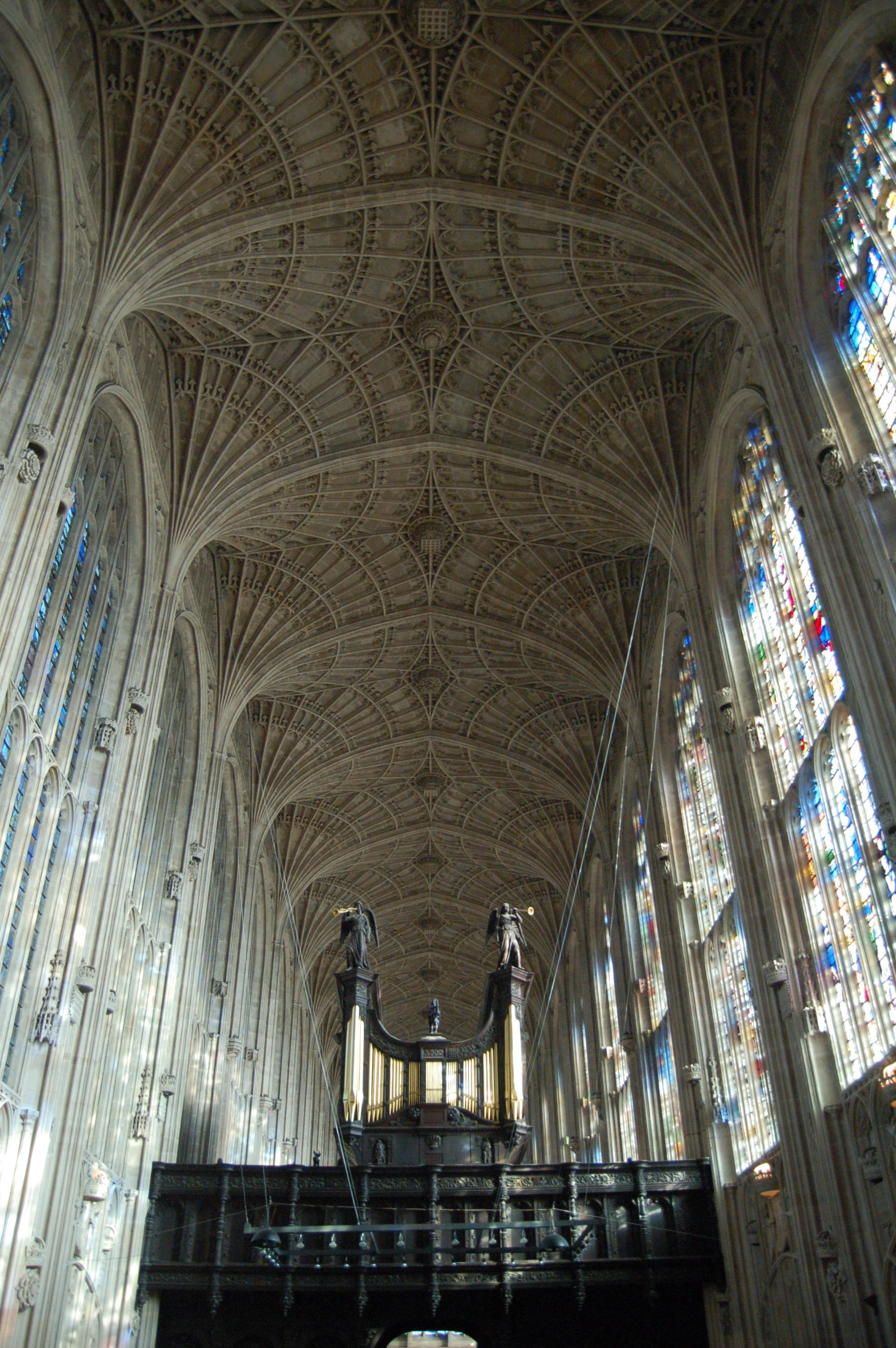
Vaulting, King's College Chapel, Cambridge

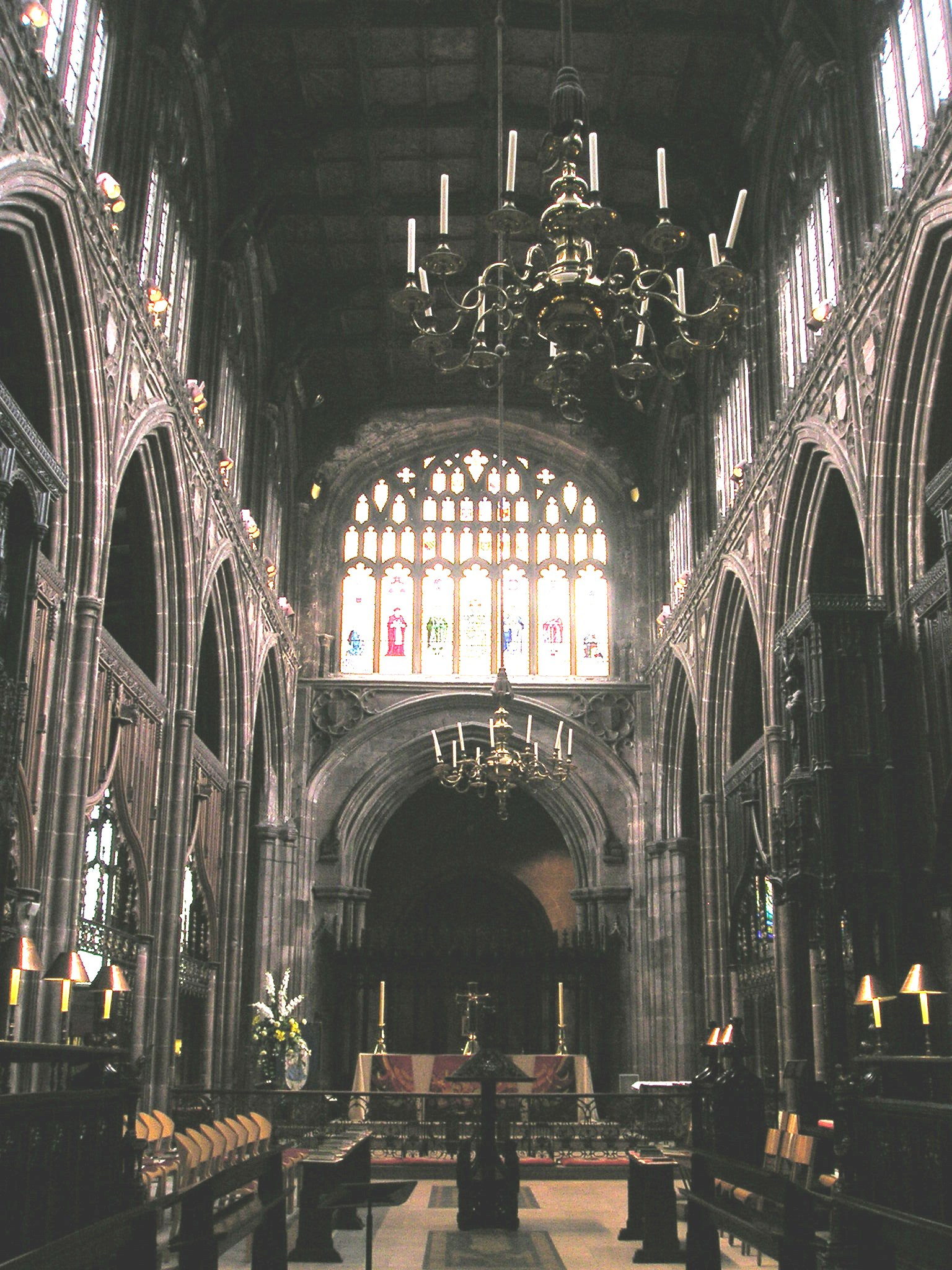
Choir of Manchester Cathedral

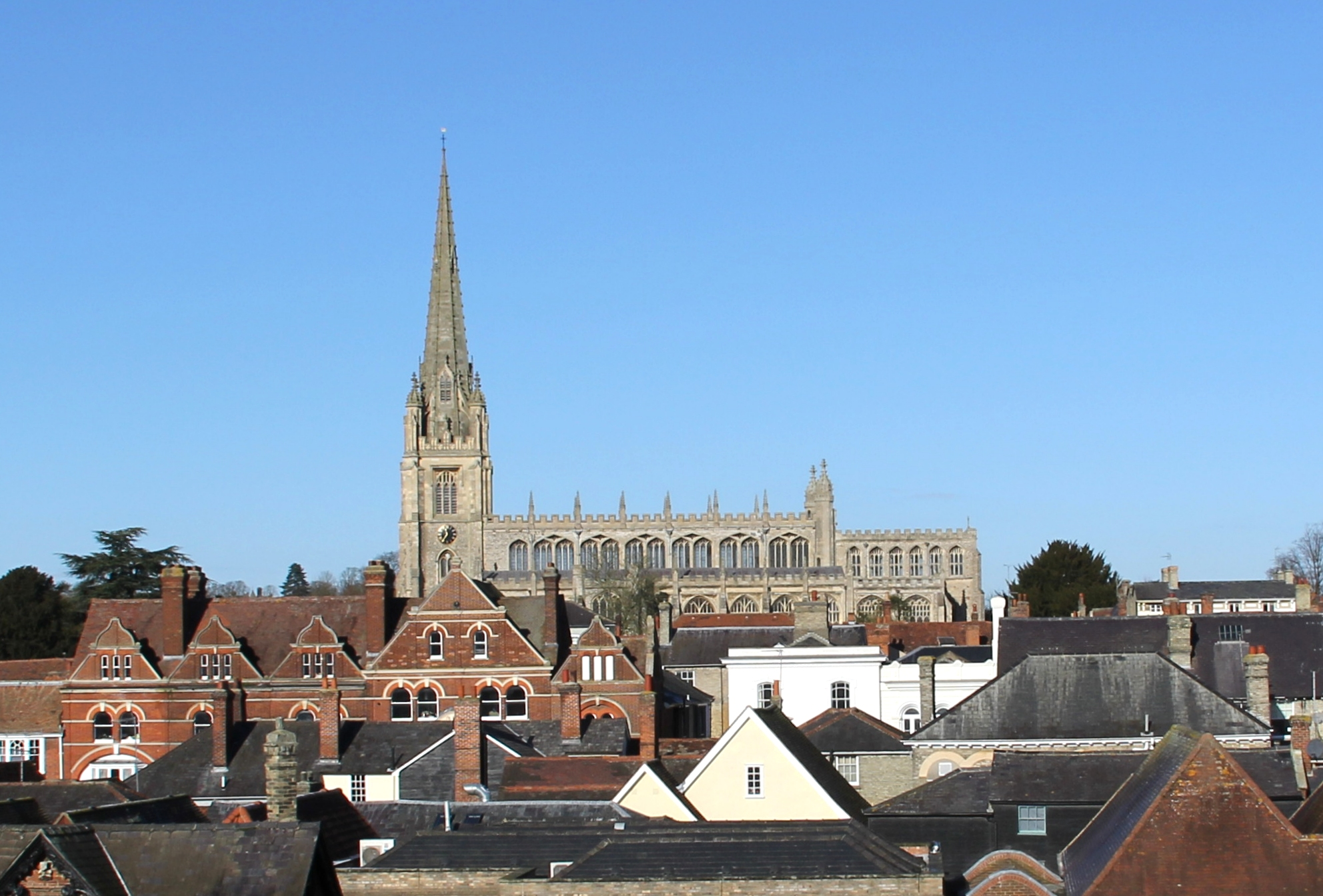
St Mary's Church, Saffron Walden
