= Petre baronets =

Extinct baronetcy in the Baronetage of England

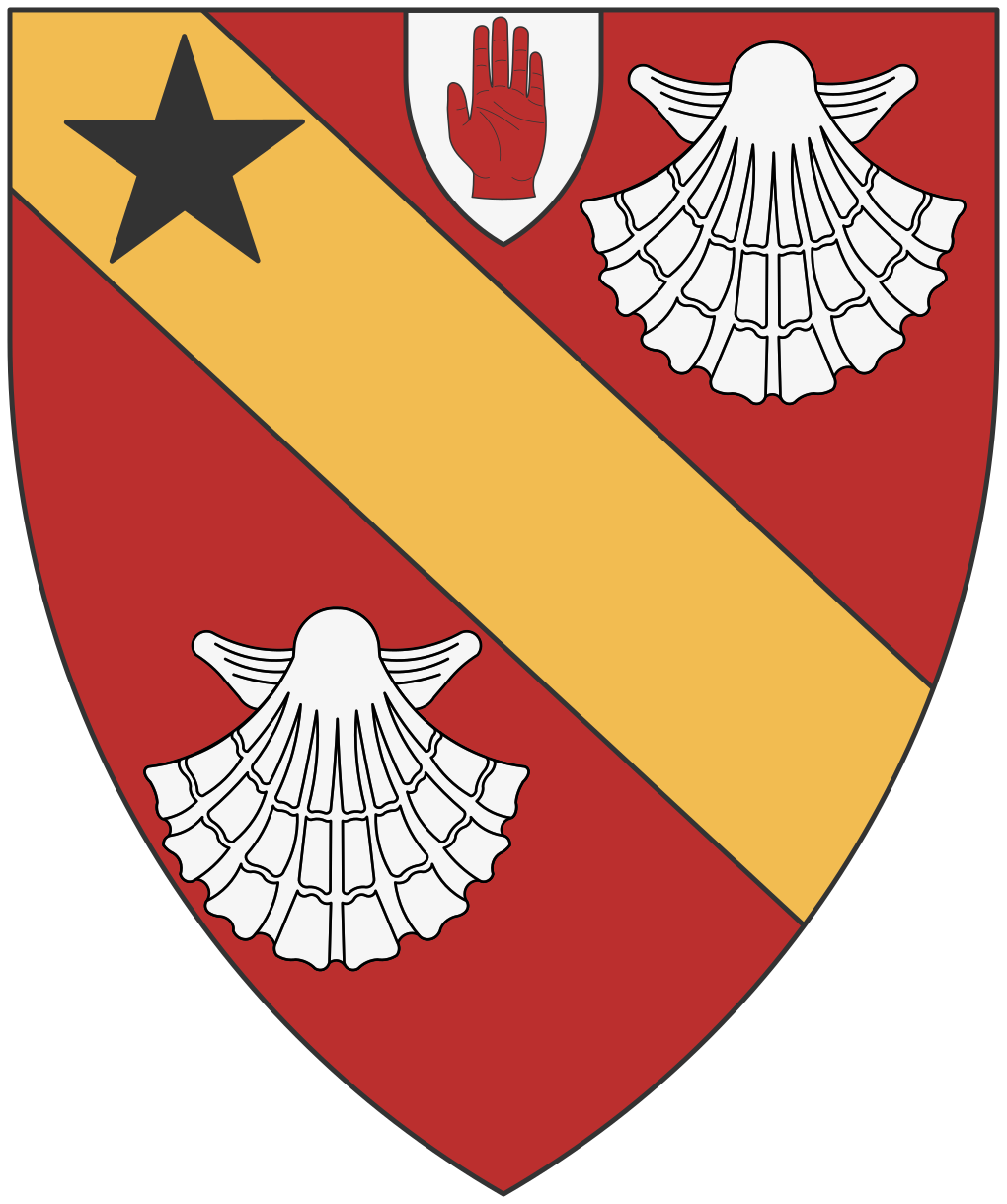
The coat of arms of the Petre baronets.

The Petre Baronetcy, of Cranham Hall in the County of Essex, was a title in the Baronetage of England. It was created in circa 1642 for Francis Petre. The third Baronet was a Jesuit and close adviser to King James II. The title became extinct on the death of the fifth Baronet in 1722.

The Petre Baronets were members of a junior branch of the family headed by the Baron Petre.

== Petre baronets, of Cranham Hall (c. 1642) ==
- Sir Francis Petre, 1st Baronet (c. 1605–c. 1660)
- Sir Francis Petre, 2nd Baronet (c. 1630–c. 1679)
- Sir Edward Petre, 3rd Baronet (c. 1632–1699)
- Sir Thomas Petre, 4th Baronet (1640–c. 1715)
- Sir William Petre, 5th Baronet (1650–1722)
