= Caroline Stanley, Countess of Derby =

English aristocrat

The Right Honourable The Countess of Derby
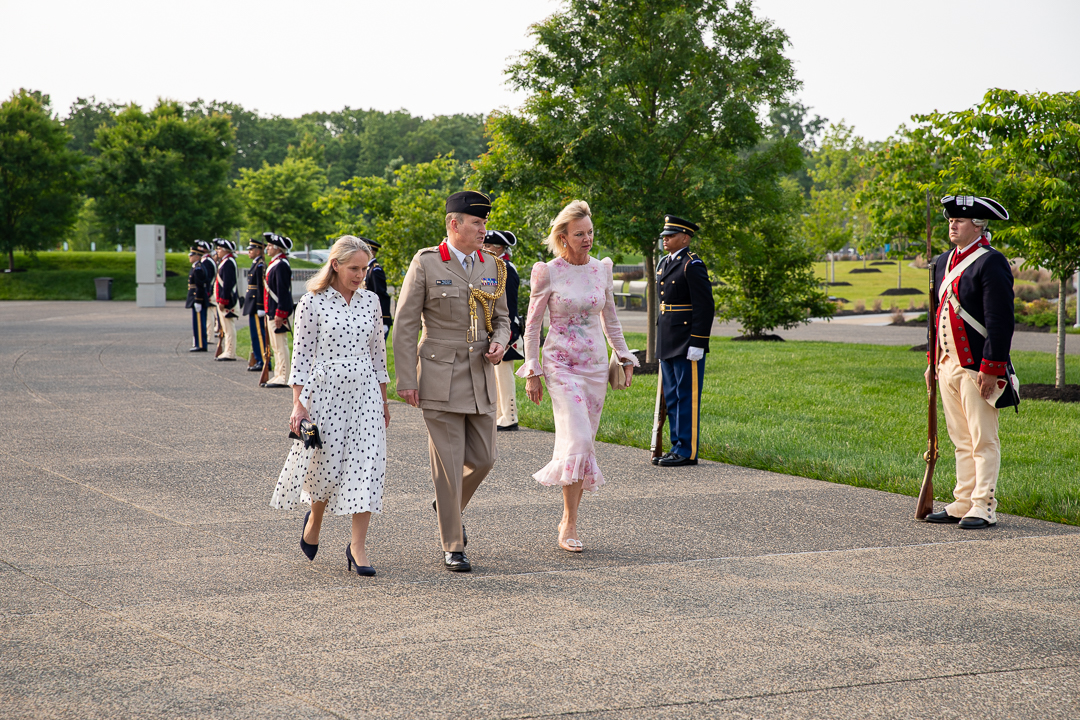
- The Countess of Derby (right) in 2025
- Born: 28 December 1963 (age 62)
- Spouse: Edward Stanley, 19th Earl of Derby (m. 1995)
- Children: 3
- Parents: Robin Neville, 10th Baron Braybrooke (father); Robin Helen Brockhoff (mother)
- Family: Neville (by birth); Stanley (by marriage)

Caroline Emma Stanley, Countess of Derby (née Neville; born 28 December 1963) is an English socialite and peeress.

== Early life ==
Caroline Emma Neville was born on 28 December 1963 to Robin Neville, 10th Baron Braybrooke, a member of the House of Neville, and his wife Robin Helen Brockhoff.

In 1990 her father succeeded his father as the 10th Baron Braybrooke, from which time she was styled as The Honourable Caroline Neville.

Before her marriage, she worked as an assistant to the Curator of the Royal Collection. In 2018, she was in charge of the Derby family's country house and was also competing in dressage. She has been involved with a number of charities, including being President for twenty-five years of Alder Hey Children’s Charity, the largest children’s hospital in Europe, while in 2006 she was Chair of Dream Auction for the NSPCC, which raised £5.6m to set up the helpline Childline Online.

She has started a podcast series on the history of her family.

== Personal life ==
In 1994 it was reported in tabloids that Caroline Neville was dating Prince Andrew, as he then was, but her engagement to Edward Stanley, 19th Earl of Derby, was announced later that year. Andrew is a godfather of her son Edward Stanley. On 21 October 1995 she married Lord Derby at the Church of St. Mary the Virgin in Saffron Walden, Essex. Upon her marriage she became the Countess of Derby. They have three children.
