= Joseph Petre, 17th Baron Petre =

Joseph William Lionel, 17th Baron Petre (5 June 1914 – 1 January 1989) was an English peer. He was the patron of three livings but, being a Roman Catholic, could not present.

== Family ==
He was the eldest child and only son of Lionel Petre, 16th Baron Petre, and his wife Catherine Boscawen. He succeeded to the title Lord Petre at only fifteen months old on 30 September 1915, after his father died in the First World War.

During the Second World War, the 17th Baron served in the Coldstream Guards as a Second-Lieutenant, and later in the Essex Regiment as Captain of the 5th Battalion. During the war, in 1941, he married Marguerite Eileen Hamilton. Their son, the present Baron Petre, was born a year later.

== Wanganui’s tribute ==
Mr. W.J. Rogers, Mayor of Wanganui in New Zealand, wished to adopt the Petre coat of arms in its city seal. A letter granting formal permission for the Borough to adopt the Petre Arms was written by Lord Clifford of Chudleigh, resident of Ealing, on 7 August 1923. His Lordship stated in his letter of authority that the then Lord Petre was a minor and it was necessary to obtain the assent of the Trustees, which had caused considerable delay. ‘I have now been informed by the solicitors (who are also my family solicitors) that the Trustees have been pleased to give their consent, so that is all that is necessary’. In concluding his letter Lord Clifford expressed his pleasure, that of his family and his grandfather’s family, at the honour the town of Wanganui had conferred upon them in desiring to adopt the Petre Arms and mentioned the pride he felt in the knowledge of his uncle’s active association with the fortunes of this beautiful and progressive town in its early days. The City Seal embodying the coat-of-arms was first used when the Borough assumed City status by proclamation in terms of the Municipal Corporations Act, 1920 on 1 July 1924. A description of the City’s Arms appears in Fairbairn’s Crests of Great Britain and Ireland.

== Almshouses ==
Father Grant instituted the repair of the Alms Row Chapel. On Monday 22 November 1922, five months after reconstruction work had been completed, Grant, with Episcopal permission, installed the Blessed Sacrament there. He had celebrated Mass in the chapel once each week since his appointment, and did so thrice weekly from 1922. E.E. Wilde commented:

The little chapel at the almshouses … is … so convenient for the old folk whose age and infirmities prevent some of them worshipping in the older but more distant chapel … (viz. at Ingatestone Hall). Before the opening of the church of SS John the Evangelist and Erconwald in 1932, Catholics in the village of Ingatestone could also take advantage of the almshouses’ chapel, rather than walk the mile to the Hall.

Mass was still celebrated in the chapel after 1932: indeed, Hugh Verity, who was at Ingatestone from 1935 to 1965, and who was Treasurer of the Charity, normally said Mass there once a week. Pensioners continued to reside in the Almshouses until the early 1970s.

However, the endowment began to prove insufficient for the needs of the buildings themselves. The fabric deteriorated and they began to fall into disrepair. Once threatened with demolition, Lord Petre eventually offered the almshouses to the Diocese of Brentwood for renovation and for use for a charitable purpose. A total of £120,000 was required for the necessary repairs and alterations. A Trust was established, with six trustees, including Lord Petre himself, and Bishop Patrick Casey. A government grant of £49,000 was secured, £5,000 was received from the Almshouse Association of Great Britain, £10,000 from the Diocese of Brentwood, as well as a loan from another charity, and a smaller one from the Essex County Council. Each of the cottages is now occupied.

In 1978, the Ginge Petre Charity Almshouses were officially re-opened and dedicated with the celebration of Mass, in the presence of Lord Petre, by Bishop Casey. The chapel dedicated to St. John Payne, again houses the Blessed Sacrament, and Mass is celebrated there regularly.

Peerage of England
Preceded by Lionel George Carroll Petre	Baron Petre; 1915–1989	Succeeded by John Patrick Lionel Petre
