= Robin Neville, 10th Baron Braybrooke =

British peer and military officer (1932–2017)

The Right Honourable The Lord Braybrooke KStJ

10th Baron Braybrooke
- In office 12 February 1990 – 5 June 2017
- Preceded by: Henry Neville, 9th Baron Braybrooke
- Succeeded by: Richard Neville, 11th Baron Braybrooke

26th Visitor of Magdalene College, Cambridge
- In office 12 February 1990 – 5 June 2017
- Preceded by: Henry Seymour Neville, 9th Baron Braybrooke
- Succeeded by: Richard Neville, 11th Baron Braybrooke

Lord Lieutenant of Essex
- In office 3 August 1992 – October 2000
- Preceded by: Sir Andrew Lewis
- Succeeded by: John Petre, 18th Baron Petre

Deputy Lieutenant of Essex
- In office 1980–1992

Personal details
- Born: Robin Henry Charles Neville; 29 January 1932 United Kingdom
- Died: 5 June 2017 (aged 85) Abbey House, Saffron Walden, United Kingdom
- Spouse(s): Robin Helen Brockhoff (m. 1955; div. 1974) Linda Norman (m. 1974; div. 1998) Perina Courtauld (m. 1998; died 2017)
- Children: 8, including Caroline Stanley, Countess of Derby
- Parent(s): Henry Seymour Neville, 9th Baron Braybrooke; Muriel Evelyn Manning
- Education: Eton College; Royal Agricultural College
- Alma mater: Magdalene College, Cambridge
- Profession: Military officer

Robin Henry Charles Neville, 10th Baron Braybrooke KStJ (29 January 1932 – 5 June 2017) was a British peer and military officer. He served as Lord Lieutenant of Essex from 1992 until 2000.

== Biography ==
Robin Henry Charles Neville was born on 29 January 1932 as the only son of Henry Seymour Neville, 9th Baron Braybrooke, and Muriel Evelyn Manning. When he was seven years old, during World War II, he was evacuated to Llandovery, Carmarthenshire in South West Wales and stayed at the home of a retired guard of the Great Western Railway. While staying in Llandovery he developed an interest in railways. He later had a miniature railway built at Audley End.

He was educated at Eton College and served in the Rifle Brigade. From 1951 to 1952 he served in the 3rd Battalion King's African Rifles in Kenya and Malaya. When he returned to England after his military service, he studied history at Magdalene College, Cambridge, graduating in 1955. He held honorary degrees from the University of Essex and Anglia Ruskin University.

Braybrooke had only a life interest in the Audley End Estate due to a will trust created by the 7th Baron. The current beneficiaries of Audley End Estate are (but not limited to) the heirs general of the only daughter of the 7th Baron.

A trained pilot, he operated a small airfield on the Audley End Estate called the Audley End International Aerodome. Audley End House was sold to English Heritage in 1948 by the trustees of the estate in tenure of the 9th Baron Braybrooke. Lord Braybrooke became Deputy Lieutenant of Essex from 1980 to 1992.

Lord Braybrooke was married three times. In 1955 he married his first wife, Robin, with whom he had five daughters: Amanda Muriel May Neville, Caroline Emma Neville, Henrietta Jane Neville, Victoria Neville, and Arabella Neville. One of his daughters from his first marriage, Henrietta, died in a riding accident in 1980. He had three daughters with his second wife, Linda: Sara Lucy Neville, Emma Charlotte Neville, and Lucinda Octavia Neville. He married his third wife, Perina (née Courtauld), in 1998.

He succeeded his father and became the 10th Baron Braybrooke in 1990. From 1992 to 2000 he served as Lord Lieutenant of Essex.

He died on 5 June 2017 at Abbey House near Saffron Walden. A private funeral was held at the Church of St Mary the Virgin on 21 July 2017. He was succeeded to the Barony by his fourth cousin once removed, Richard Neville. On his death the life interest in the 6,500 acre Audley End Estate transferred to Louise Newman, the granddaughter of the 7th Baron Braybrooke. His eldest daughter, Amanda, criticised agnatic primogeniture, which stops daughters from inheriting titles where the original letters patent specify that it may be inherited by males only.

Honorary titles
Preceded by Henry Neville	Visitor of Magdalene College, Cambridge; 2017–present	Succeeded by Richard Neville
Honorary titles
Preceded by Sir Andrew Lewis	Lord Lieutenant of Essex; 1992–2002	Succeeded by The Lord Petre
Peerage of Great Britain
Preceded by Henry Neville	Baron Braybrooke; 1990–2017	Succeeded by Richard Neville
