= Baron Petre =

Title in the Peerage of England

- Arms of Petre: Gules, a bend or between two escallops argent
- Peerage: Peerage of England
- First holder: John Petre, 1st Baron Petre
- Present holder: John Petre, 18th Baron Petre
- Heir apparent: Hon. Dominic Petre
- Seat: Ingatestone Hall

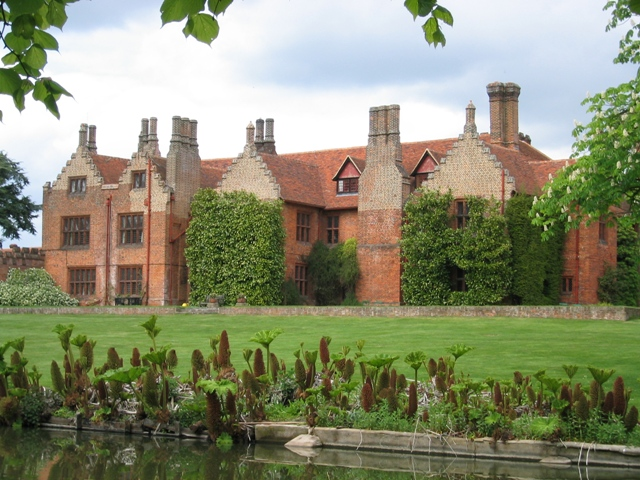
Ingatestone Hall. The seat of the Petre family.

Baron Petre (/ˈpiːtə/), of Writtle, in the County of Essex, is a title in the Peerage of England. It was created in 1603 for Sir John Petre. His family has since been associated with the county of Essex. He represented Essex in parliament and served as Lord Lieutenant of Essex. Lord Petre was the son of Sir William Petre, Secretary of State to Henry VIII, Edward VI, Mary I, and Elizabeth I. Sir William acquired Ingatestone Hall and the surrounding manor from Henry for the full market value after it had been surrendered to the King by Barking Abbey during the Suppression of the Monasteries.

== History ==
The first Baron was succeeded by his son, William Petre, 2nd Baron Petre. He sat as Member of Parliament for Essex. His grandson, William Petre, 4th Baron Petre, was one of the accused in the Titus Oates plot and died in the Tower of London in 1684. His younger brother, Thomas Petre, 6th Baron Petre, was Lord Lieutenant of Essex. His great-grandson, Robert Petre, 9th Baron Petre, who succeeded his father the year of his birth, married Anne Howard, daughter of Philip Howard, younger brother of Edward Howard, 9th Duke of Norfolk. On her uncle's death in 1777 Anne became co-heiress to the baronies of Howard, Furnivall, Strange of Blackmere, Talbot, Braose of Gower, Dacre of Gillesland, Greystock, Ferrers of Wemme, Giffard of Brimsfield and Verdon.

Their great-great-grandson, Bernard Petre, 14th Baron Petre, married Etheldreda, daughter of William Robinson Clark. In 1913 (five years after the death of Lord Petre) the abeyance of the ancient barony of Furnivall was terminated by the King in favour of their daughter Mary Frances Katherine Petre, who became the nineteenth Baroness Furnivall (see the Baron Furnivall for more information). Petre was succeeded by his younger brother, Philip Petre, 15th Baron Petre. As of 2017 the title is held by the latter's great-grandson, John Petre, 18th Baron Petre, who succeeded his father in 1989. Lord Petre has been Lord Lieutenant of Essex since 2002.

Another member of the Petre family was Father Sir Edward Petre, 3rd Baronet, the unpopular chaplain and advisor to James II. James made him Clerk of the Closet and asked the Pope to make him a bishop and later a Cardinal but was refused both requests.

The Petre family have been staunchly loyal to Roman Catholicism. It was the first Baron who publicly acknowledged his Catholicism. At least twelve members of the family have been Jesuits. The family has also produced two bishops, Francis (1692–1775) and Benjamin (1672–1758). These two were coadjutor bishops of, respectively, Bishop Dicconson and Bishop Challoner.

The feudal Lordship of Writtle had for centuries been the possession of the de Brus family and early chroniclers give the manor there as the birthplace of Robert the Bruce.

== Properties ==
The family seats are Ingatestone Hall (principal), at Ingatestone, Essex, and Writtle Park, Essex. The family-owned Thorndon Hall, near Brentwood, is set in an extensive deer park. Formerly called "Thorndon Old Hall", it burned down in the early 18th century; after which "New" Thorndon Hall was built about a mile north, in Ingrave. This too suffered from a fire in the 1880s and has since been rebuilt as flats within the repaired walls, and the family mortuary chapel nearby is now owned by Historic Chapels Trust. Thorndon Park is mostly now run by Essex County Council as a Country Park with the Petre family retaining limited ownerships.

== Barons Petre (1603) ==
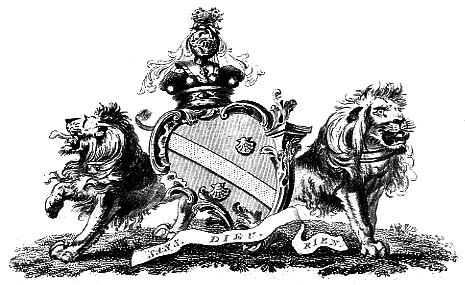
Arms of the Barons Petre.

- John Petre, 1st Baron Petre (1549–1613)
- William Petre, 2nd Baron Petre (1575–1637)
- Robert Petre, 3rd Baron Petre (1599–1638)
- William Petre, 4th Baron Petre (1626–1684)
- John Petre, 5th Baron Petre (1629–1684)
- Thomas Petre, 6th Baron Petre (1633–1706)
- Robert Petre, 7th Baron Petre (1689–1713)
- Robert James Petre, 8th Baron Petre (1713–1742); born posthumously 2 months and 10 days after the death of his father, the 7th Baron; succeeded to the title immediately upon his birth.
- Robert Edward Petre, 9th Baron Petre (1742–1801), succeeded to the title about four months after his birth upon the death of his father, the 8th Baron.
- Robert Edward Petre, 10th Baron Petre (1763–1809)
- William Henry Francis Petre, 11th Baron Petre (1793–1850)
- William Bernard Petre, 12th Baron Petre (1817–1884)
- William Joseph Petre, 13th Baron Petre (1847–1893)
- Bernard Henry Philip Petre, 14th Baron Petre (1858–1908)
- Philip Benedict Joseph Petre, 15th Baron Petre (1864–1908)
- Lionel George Carroll Petre, 16th Baron Petre (1890–1915)
- Joseph William Lionel Petre, 17th Baron Petre (1914–1989), succeeded to the title about fifteen months after his birth upon the death, in battle, of his father, the 16th Baron.
- John Patrick Lionel Petre, 18th Baron Petre (b. 1942)

The heir apparent is the present holder's son Hon. Dominic William Petre (b. 1966)
The heir apparent's heir apparent is his son William John Jude Petre (b. 2001)

== Line of succession ==
- John Petre, 1st Baron Petre (1549–1613)
  - William Petre, 2nd Baron Petre (1575–1637)
    - Robert Petre, 3rd Baron Petre (1599–1638)
      - William Petre, 4th Baron Petre (1626–1684)
      - John Petre, 5th Baron Petre (1629–1684)
      - Thomas Petre, 6th Baron Petre (1633–1706)
        - Robert Petre, 7th Baron Petre (1689–1713)
          - Robert Petre, 8th Baron Petre (1713–1742)
            - Robert Petre, 9th Baron Petre (1742–1801)
              - Robert Petre, 10th Baron Petre (1763–1809)
                - William Petre, 11th Baron Petre (1793–1850)
                  - William Petre, 12th Baron Petre (1817–1884)
                    - William Petre, 13th Baron Petre (1847–1893)
                    - Bernard Petre, 14th Baron Petre (1858–1908)
                    - Philip Petre, 15th Baron Petre (1864–1908)
                      - Lionel Petre, 16th Baron Petre (1890–1915)
                        - Joseph Petre, 17th Baron Petre (1914–1989)
                          - John Petre, 18th Baron Petre (b. 1942)
                            - (1) Dominic Petre (b. 1966)
                              - (2) William Petre (b. 2001)

== See also ==
- Father Edward Petre
- Francis Petre
- Maude Petre
- Baron Furnivall
- Petre Baronets, of Cranham Hall
- Francis Loraine Petre, military historian
