= William Petre, 12th Baron Petre =

William Bernard, 12th Baron Petre (20 December 1817 – 4 July 1884) "a pattern of charity and piety", was an enthusiastic builder of churches. To a greater or lesser extent, he was responsible for new churches in Brentwood, Chipping Ongar, Barking, Romford and Chelmsford and a mortuary chapel (designed by William Wardell, a pupil of Augustus Welby Northmore Pugin) in the grounds of Thorndon Hall (dedicated on 11 September 1857, and used last for interment in 1965), as well as twice extending the chapel at Ingatestone Hall, which then served as the parish church for the locality.

== Family ==
He was a son of William Henry Francis Petre, 11th Baron Petre and his first wife Frances Charlotte Bedingfeld (1796–1822).

His maternal grandparents were Sir Richard Bedingfeld, 5th Baronet and his wife Charlotte Georgiana Jerningham. Charlotte was a daughter of Sir William Jerningham, 6th Baronet and Frances Dillon.

The senior Frances was a daughter of Henry Dillon, 11th Viscount Dillon and Lady Charlotte Lee. The senior Charlotte was a daughter of George Lee, 2nd Earl of Lichfield and Frances Hales. The eldest Frances was a daughter of Sir John Hales, 4th Baronet.

== Wardell ==
William Wardell went to Australia at the age of 32 because he had tuberculosis. He designed many buildings there including the St Mary's Cathedral, Sydney. In testimonials to Wardell, Lord Petre expressed confidence in him and noted his "acknowledged position in the first rank of England’s architects".

== Order of Pius IX ==
It was no doubt for these charitable works that Pope Pius IX awarded Lord Petre the Order of Pius IX though there is a family tradition that he received it in recognition of his services as commander of a force of Papal Zouaves, international volunteers, in the defense of Rome against Giuseppe Garibaldi.

If this sounds unlikely, besides the Swiss Guard, Pius had another bodyguard called the Zouaves in which it was customary for young Catholic gentlemen, disqualified from becoming officers in the British Army, to serve. With the departure of Pius' allied forces of the Second French Empire at the outbreak of the Franco-Prussian War (1870), the Papal States could offer little resistance to the Italian Army and fell.

== Marriage and children ==
On 26 September 1843, in London, Petre married Mary Theresa Clifford (1 September 1823 – 31 December 1895). She was a daughter of Charles Thomas Clifford and Theresa Constable-Maxwell. Her paternal grandparents were Charles Clifford, 6th Baron Clifford of Chudleigh and Eleanor Mary Arundell. Eleanor was a daughter of Henry Arundell, 8th Baron Arundell of Wardour and his wife Mary Christina Conquest.

Petre and his wife had twelve children:

- Frances Mary Petre (c. 1846 - 25 May 1920). Married George Forbes, 7th Earl of Granard. They were the parents of Bernard Forbes, 8th Earl of Granard.
- William Joseph Petre, 13th Baron Petre (26 February 1847 - 8 May 1893).
- Isabella Mary Petre (c. 1849 - 15 July 1919). Married Frederick Stapleton-Bretherton. They were parents to Evelyn Princess Blücher.
- Margaret Mary Petre (c. 1850 - ?). A nun.
- Katherine Mary Lucy Petre (c. 1851 - 21 October 1932).
- Theresa Mary Louisa Petre (c. 1853 - ?). A nun.
- Mary Winifrede Petre (c. 1855 - 31 July 1947). A Sister of Charity.
- Eleanor Mary Petre (1856 - 17 November 1908). Married Edward Southwell Trafford.
- Bernard Henry Philip Petre, 14th Baron Petre (31 May 1858 - 16 June 1908).
- Monica Mary Petre (1860 - 15 May 1907). Married John Erdeswick Butler-Bowden, a Lieutenant-Colonel of the British Army.
- Philip Benedict Joseph Petre, 15th Baron Petre (21 August 1864 - 6 December 1908). He was the father of Lionel Petre, 16th Baron Petre.
- Joseph Lucius Henry Petre (22 April 1866 - 24 January 1900). A Captain of the British Army. He fought in the Second Boer War and was among the casualties of the Battle of Spion Kop.

== Decline of Thorndon ==
By the 1860s, the pomp and glamour of earlier years of living at Thorndon had begun to fall away. The young John Dalberg-Acton, 1st Baron Acton spent a weekend at Thorndon; he had been invited because Lady Petre had a bevy of "Good looking and divinely tall" daughters to marry off. The studious young man, however, did not enjoy himself much, finding the favourite pastime of roller skating in the ballroom too boisterous for his taste.

However, it was the Great fire of 1878 that finally ended Thorndon's days as a great house. William almost certainly commissioned a large group of furniture, now at Ingatestone, in the latter part of the 19th century, possibly replacing items destroyed in the fire.

== Family reputation ==
However much apart from noble court the Petres may have kept themselves, they seem to have been popular in the vicinity, and kind and liberal neighbors, for they are not infrequently referred to by travelers, and Daniel Defoe writes of them in his A tour thro' the Whole Island of Great Britain (1724–1726).

'From hence [Lees Priory], keeping the London Road, I came to Chelmsford, mentioned before, and Ingatestone, five miles west, which I mention again because in the Parish Church of this town are to be seen the ancient monuments if the noble family of Petre whose seat and large estate lie in the neighborhood, and whose family, by constant series of beneficent action to the poor, and bounty upon all charitable occasions, have gained an affectionate esteem through all that part of the county, such as no prejudice of religion could wear out, or perhaps ever may – and I must confess need not, for good and great actions commend our respect, let the opinions of persons be otherwise what they may'.

The friendliness was carried on long after Defoe's visit. Miss Parkin still retains a lively memory of the kindliness of William, 12th Baron, and has a photograph, taken by him in the Rectory garden, of Rector Parkin and his family.

== Romford Church ==
He donated the lands for the building of the church of St Edward the Confessor in Romford, consecrated by Cardinal Nicholas Wiseman on 6 May 1856. The Parish priest (in 2006), Kevin W.A. Hale writes:-

"Cardinal Wiseman, First Archbishop of Westminster, consecrated the new church at Romford on 6 May 1856. It was one of the first, after the Restoration of the English Hierarchy. The land for the church had been donated by the Petre family of Thorndon and Ingatestone Hall, and they also paid for the building. At that time, Romford was rather more rural and had only a handful of Catholic families, thus the proportions of the church reflected the meagre size of the congregation. Today, St Edward’s stands at the centre of what is a thriving market town, rather more urban in character."

"Owing to the nature of the ceremonies and the necessity of commencing at an early hour, it was impossible to accommodate a large congregation at the consecration of the church. Two days later, on 8 May, Cardinal Wiseman returned for the opening ceremony and High Mass, at which he preached. It was the octave day of the Ascension and hence the text chosen for the sermon. Secular newspaper reports of the time state that the Cardinal preached standing at the centre of the Altar, and that it was long! They also state that the congregation, at the opening, was large only because Catholic families had come from far and wide for it is well known that it is almost a rarity to find a Romanist in our town!"

"I am very pleased to present this re-publication of Cardinal Wiseman’s sermon. Though lengthy by modern standards, it is a masterpiece and reflects the enthusiasm and sense of mission which the Catholic Church in England felt at that time. It is my hope that the reading of this sermon today will be an inspiration for our work of the new evangelisation of our land."

=== Correspondence with Wiseman ===
On 10 May 1856, Cardinal Wiseman wrote to Lord Petre from London:

"My dear Lord, It is in compliance with your Lordship’s kind wish, that I publish this sermon. I do not regret any little additional trouble this may give me: for it is fully compensated by the opportunity afforded me, of publicly testifying my regard for your Lordship. While the new church at Romford will be a lasting monument of your Lordship’s generous zeal, these few lines may serve as its inscription; to record the gratitude of a poor congregation, through one whose joy it is fully to share it, and whose duty it is to express it."

"With earnest prayer for every blessing on Your Lordship, and Your House, I am ever, My dear Lord, Your Lordship’s affectionate Servant in Christ."

Peerage of England
Preceded by William Henry Francis Petre	Baron Petre; 1850–1884	Succeeded by William Joseph Petre
