= Lord Lieutenant of Essex =

Civil post in Essex, England

This is a list of people who have served as Lord Lieutenant of Essex. Since 1688, all the Lord Lieutenants have also been Custos Rotulorum of Essex.

- John Petre, 1st Baron Petre
- John de Vere, 16th Earl of Oxford 1558–?
- Robert Dudley, 1st Earl of Leicester 3 July 1585 – 4 September 1588
- William Cecil, 1st Baron Burghley 31 December 1588 – 4 August 1598
- vacant
- Robert Radclyffe, 5th Earl of Sussex 26 August 1603 – 5 February 1629 jointly with
- Robert Rich, 2nd Earl of Warwick 8 September 1625 – 1642 jointly with
- Richard Weston, 1st Earl of Portland 5 February 1629 – 31 March 1635 and
- William Maynard, 1st Baron Maynard 6 August 1635 – 17 December 1640 and
- James Hay, 2nd Earl of Carlisle 8 January 1641 – 1642
- Interregnum
- Aubrey de Vere, 20th Earl of Oxford 13 August 1660 – 1687 jointly with
- Christopher Monck, 2nd Duke of Albemarle 30 November 1675 – 1687
- Thomas Petre, 6th Baron Petre 18 February 1688 – 1688
- Aubrey de Vere, 20th Earl of Oxford 25 October 1688 – 12 March 1703
- Francis North, 2nd Baron Guilford 23 March 1703 – 1705
- Richard Savage, 4th Earl Rivers 16 April 1705 – 18 August 1712
- Henry St John, 1st Viscount Bolingbroke 24 October 1712 – 1714
- Henry Howard, 6th Earl of Suffolk 7 January 1715 – 19 September 1718
- Charles Howard, 7th Earl of Suffolk 10 December 1718 – 9 February 1722
- Henry O'Brien, 8th Earl of Thomond 2 April 1722 – 20 April 1741
- Benjamin Mildmay, 1st Earl Fitzwalter 7 May 1741 – 29 February 1756
- William Nassau de Zuylestein, 4th Earl of Rochford 3 April 1756 – 28 September 1781
- John Waldegrave, 3rd Earl Waldegrave 7 November 1781 – 22 October 1784
- John Griffin, 4th Baron Howard de Walden 17 November 1784 – 25 May 1797
- Richard Griffin, 2nd Baron Braybrooke 27 January 1798 – 28 February 1825
- Henry Maynard, 3rd Viscount Maynard 19 April 1825 – 19 May 1865
- Thomas Crosbie William Trevor, 22nd Baron Dacre 5 October 1865 – 1869
- Sir Thomas Burch Western, 1st Baronet 11 May 1869 – 30 May 1873
- Chichester Parkinson-Fortescue, 1st Baron Carlingford 4 September 1873 – 1892
- John Strutt, 3rd Baron Rayleigh 2 February 1892 – 1 August 1901
- Francis Greville, 5th Earl of Warwick 1 August 1901 – 1919
- Amelius Lockwood, 1st Baron Lambourne 11 February 1919 – 26 December 1928
- Sir Richard Beale Colvin 31 January 1929 – 1936
- Sir Francis Henry Douglas Charlton Whitmore, 1st Baronet 16 April 1936 – 1958
- Sir John Ruggles-Brise, 2nd Baronet 6 September 1958 – 1978
- Sir Andrew Lewis 1978–1992
- Robin Neville, 10th Baron Braybrooke 3 August 1992 – October 2002
- John Petre, 18th Baron Petre 16 December 2002 – 4 August 2017
- Jennifer Tolhurst 5 August 2017 – 2 December 2026
- Nicholas Charrington 2 December 2026 -

== Deputy lieutenants ==
A deputy lieutenant of Essex is commissioned by the Lord Lieutenant of Essex. Deputy lieutenants support the work of the lord-lieutenant. There can be several deputy lieutenants at any time, depending on the population of the county. Their appointment does not terminate with the changing of the lord-lieutenant, but they usually retire at age 75.

=== 18th Century ===
- 15 February 1793: Thomas Gardiner Bramston
- 15 February 1793: George Davis Carr
- 23 March 1797: William Manley
- 23 March 1797: Jackson Barwis
- 9 July 1803: George Lee
- 9 July 1803: John Crosse Godsalve Crosse
- 9 July 1803: John Wallinger Arnold Wallinger
- 9 July 1803: John Hopkins Dare

== Sources ==
- J.C. Sainty (1970). "Lieutenancies of Counties, 1585–1642". Bulletin of the Institute of Historical Research (Special Supplement No. 8): 20. ISBN 978-0-90117-915-9.
- J.C. Sainty (1979). List of Lieutenants of Counties of England and Wales 1660-1974. London: Swift Printers (Sales) Ltd.
