= William Petre, 13th Baron Petre =

William Joseph Petre, 13th Baron Petre (26 February 1847 – 8 May 1893) was an English nobleman and priest (Monsignor) of the Roman Catholic Church.

== Family ==
Petre was the eldest son of William Bernard Petre, 12th Baron Petre and Mary Theresa Clifford (1823–1895). His maternal grandparents were Charles Thomas Clifford and Theresa Constable-Maxwell. Theresa was a daughter of Charles Clifford, 6th Baron Clifford of Chudleigh and Eleanor Mary Arundell. Eleanor was a daughter of Henry Arundell, 8th Baron Arundell of Wardour and his wife Mary Christina Conquest.

== Priesthood ==
Petre began studying for the priesthood in 1872, was ordained in 1874, and taught for several years at Downside Abbey. During his time there, Petre endowed the school with a library (from which the works of Charles Dickens were banned) a cloister and a swimming pool. Petre eventually found conventional Catholic education narrow and stultifying and resolved to open his own school.

Petre was in Holy Orders and Domestic Prelate to the Court of the Holy See. He wrote several polemical pamphlets on the problem of Catholic Liberal Education; one pamphlet is highly critical of Jacques Offenbach, whose music Petre claimed was intended "merely to satisfy the cravings of sensibilities fuddled by brandy and soda water".

== Woburn Park ==
Largely from the sale of the family library, in the summer of 1877 he purchased Woburn Park, home of the wealthy Southcote family, 100–120 acres (0.40–0.49 km^{2}) of mostly deer park-style landscape fronting briefly the River Thames, in Addlestone, Surrey, England and containing a commanding knoll above the end of the combined Bourne, a deep stream and its confluence. The wide knoll is Woburn Hill where Philip Southcote turned its farmhouse into a mansion in the early 18th century.

In Woburn Park, Petre began a Catholic boarding school with a half-dozen boys. It was deliberately unconventional: it had few explicit rules and a Parliament at which the school's administration was freely debated by the pupils. These debates were recorded in the school magazine, The Amoeba.

Pupils dressed for dinner every night and special mention is made of the school's "constant hot water". The school grew and its ceremonial mace, made in 1881, displayed in the Stone Hall comes from the "parliament". Lord Petre, wearing sumptuous robes, acted as Speaker as the boys, sitting as members for imaginary constituencies such as Chilcompton, Gurney Slade and Radstock, debated "bills" in precise imitation of the House of Commons.

In Iain Moncreiffe of that Ilk's "Essex" a passage reads: "A late lord Petre was himself a priest, who took a special interest in education, and carried on a lordly school at Woburn Hill, once renowned as a ferme ornée, between Weybridge and Chertsey".

The first incarnation of the school failed financially after a few years in midsummer 1884. The accidental death by drowning of Fotheringham, a senior boy staying at the site in the holidays, dented the confidence of prospective parents.

In 1884, Petre sold the premises to the Josephites for their St George's College.

=== Hiatus ===
From a Catholic publication at the time:

The aim was to bring up the youth of the richer classes in the surroundings of comfort and refinement which belong to their station, to carry on the habits of home life, though at school; and especially to prepare the rising generation to take part in public life by the marked development of the system of self-government which has been carried out through the Woburn Parliament. The school has risen to number some eighty boys, and may be said to be at the height of its scholastic and social success, but it is to be closed. This determination has been brought about by several causes, the accumulative strength of which has been thought to be conclusive, Mgr. Petre’s health has been seriously undermined by the incessant labours and anxieties which he has endured during the last seven or eight years. ...various urgent family reasons have also had their weight in forcing on but one conclusion.

Meanwhile, a Belgian Congregation of Josephite Brothers, who have a school at Croydon, were desiring to improve their position, and, after visiting Woburn some two or three months ago, were so much pleased with its position and appearance that they made an offer to purchase the whole property. Under all the circumstances it was thought prudent to accept this offer, 'after the most careful and anxious consideration, and under the best advice' to quote the words of Mgr. Petre’s circular to the parents of his scholars. ...It has been a touching and a noble sight to see the heir to an old Catholic peerage throw aside all purely worldly and vain attractions and devote the best years of his life to the work of an educational reform, generously and sympathetically building up and courageously striking out on behalf of his ideal. ...

If Mgr. Petre has done no more than emphasise the necessity of preparing Catholic youth to take part in the public life of the country, he deserves our lasting gratitude. ... Those who have grown up within its walls, and those who are still within them, bear ample and decided testimony to the punctuality, exactness, and even punctiliousness of its discipline..."

== Baron ==
Five weeks later, on 4 July 1884, William's father died and he succeeded to the title as 13th Baron Petre of Writtle. That same year saw the beginning of Petre's new school at Northwood Park on the Isle of Wight, however, Northwood closed about a year later.

Lord Petre then retired to The Hyde in Ingatestone, Essex; also, in 1885 the Duchy of Lancaster granted him the Liberty of Clare and the Manor of Arnolds. Eight years later, he died at the early age of 46, his health apparently undermined by the strain of attempting to establish a new type of education for Catholic youth. He was a man of simple tastes and all who knew him spoke well of him. He was kind to his tenants, to the poor and especially to the young.

Peerage of England
Preceded by William Bernard Petre	Baron Petre; 1884–1893	Succeeded by Bernard Henry Philip Petre
