= Lionel Petre, 16th Baron Petre =

Captain Lionel George Carroll, 16th Baron Petre (3 November 1890 – 30 September 1915) was an English peer.

Born in Wadhurst, Sussex in 1890, he was educated at the Oratory, Edgbaston and Sandhurst. There is a story that he originally intended to join the King's Royal Rifle Corps but was turned down he then joined the fourth Pioneer Battalion, Coldstream Guards. He became a lieutenant and finally a captain. In 1908, he became engaged to Catherine Margaret Boscawen (1891–1983), granddaughter of the 6th Viscount Falmouth, taking a diamond from an earring of the Petre jewels to make the ring. They married at Westminster Cathedral on 28 June 1913.

He became the 16th Lord Petre after his father's death in December 1908. His father had taken over the title from his brother for only six months.

He served in France and Belgium, but died at Paris-Plage on 30 September 1915 of wounds received in action at the Battle of Loos.

Through his mother Julia, Lord Petre is a relative of the American Carroll family of Maryland, who were prominent Catholics and Patriots in a largely Protestant society. A notable ancestor is Charles Carroll of Carrollton, the only Catholic signatory of the Declaration of Independence.

== Issue ==
The 16th Lord Petre and his wife had two children:

- Joseph William Lionel Petre, 17th Baron Petre (5 June 1914 – 1 January 1989)
- Elizabeth Mary Lionel Margaret Petre (13 December 1915 – ?); married Major Robert Healing

Peerage of England
Preceded by Philip Benedict Joseph Petre	Baron Petre; 1908–1915	Succeeded by Joseph William Lionel Petre
