= Sir Edward Petre, 3rd Baronet =

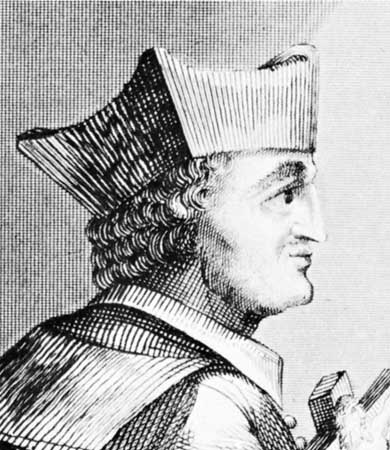
Edward Petre

Sir Edward Petre, 3rd Baronet (1631 – 15 May 1699) was an English Jesuit who became a close adviser to King James II and was appointed a privy councillor.

== Early life ==
Petre was the son of Francis Petre, 1st Baronet, of Cranham (Essex), head of a junior branch of the family of the Barons Petre, by his marriage to Elizabeth Gage, a daughter of John Gage, both Roman Catholics. In 1649 he was sent for his education to the Jesuit College at St Omer and entered the Society of Jesus in 1652, taking his final vows in 1671.

== Career ==
Petre served as a chaplain and adviser to James II of England and was an unpopular and galvanising presence at James's court. James, as a Roman Catholic reigning over a nation of Protestants, aroused much ire, and much of it was directed at Petre, his close advisor on religious matters.

Before James's accession in 1685, Petre was vice-provincial of his order. James soon made him clerk of the closet, a position without political power. Later that year, James wrote to ask Pope Innocent XI to make Petre a bishop in partibus, but Innocent refused. In 1686, Roger Palmer, James's ambassador to Rome, renewed the application, while James urged it forcibly on Ferdinando d'Adda, the papal nuncio in London. James and Castlemaine continued to push for a bishop's position for Petre through 1687, and further requested that Petre be made a cardinal, but the pope steadfastly refused. James contemplated making Petre Anglican Archbishop of York when the see fell vacant, but the pope would not grant Petre a dispensation to hold it, and he even directed Petre's superiors to rebuke him for his excessive ambition. Petre was made a privy counsellor and Clerk of the Closet the same year.

After his nomination to the Privy Council, the popular charges against Petre became more fervid than ever, reaching their height in insinuations made about the controversial birth of James Francis Edward Stuart, Prince of Wales, in 1688. Like many at James's court, Petre at first trusted Robert Spencer, but he was also among the first to detect that minister's duplicity and to break with him. Modern scholars have given mixed reviews of Petre's behaviour, and contemporary sources on both sides are biased. The Catholic Encyclopedia says of him "with little gift for politics, nor paying much heed to them, he was nevertheless severely blamed when things went wrong. He was also regardless, almost callous, as to what was said about him by friend or foe." Petre fled to France soon after William III's armies landed in England, and he remained with James in his exile. He became head of his old college of St Omer in 1693. He was later transferred to Watten in Flanders, where he died in 1699.

Baronetage of England
Preceded by Francis Petre	Baronet (of Cranham Hall) c. 1679–1699	Succeeded by Thomas Petre
