= St Mary the Virgin, Saffron Walden =

Coordinates: 52.0247°N 0.2393°E

St Mary the Virgin
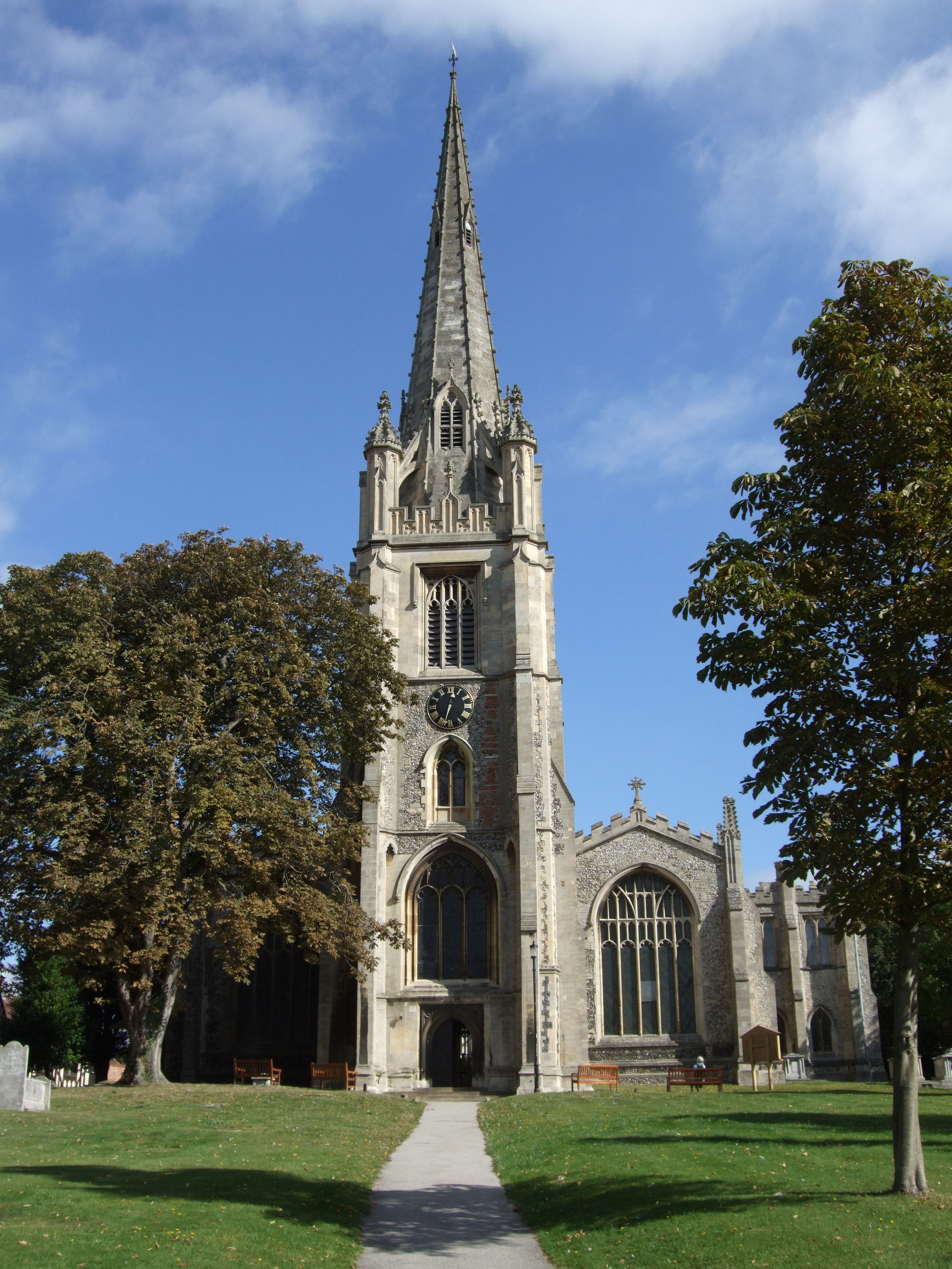
- Steeple of St Mary the Virgin
- St Mary the Virgin
- Country: England
- Denomination: Church of England
- Website: Official website

History
- Dedication: Saint Mary the Virgin

Architecture
- Heritage designation: Grade I listed building
- Designated: 1951
- Style: Perpendicular

Specifications
- Length: 183ft (56m)
- Height: 193ft (59m)

Administration
- Province: Canterbury
- Diocese: Chelmsford
- Parish: Saffron Walden

Clergy
- Rector: Rev. Jeremy Trew

St Mary the Virgin is the parish church of Saffron Walden, Essex. It is the largest non-cathedral church in Essex with an overall length of 183 feet (56 m) and a spire 193 feet (59 m) high, which is the tallest in Essex. It was designated as a Grade I listed building in 1951.

A Norman church was recorded in 1130, which in turn had replaced an earlier wooden structure. The building as it currently stands dates predominantly from a rebuilding between 1250 and 1258, with a further rebuilding in the Perpendicular style begun in about 1450, the latter stages supervised by John Wastell, the master mason who was building King's College Chapel in the nearby city of Cambridge.

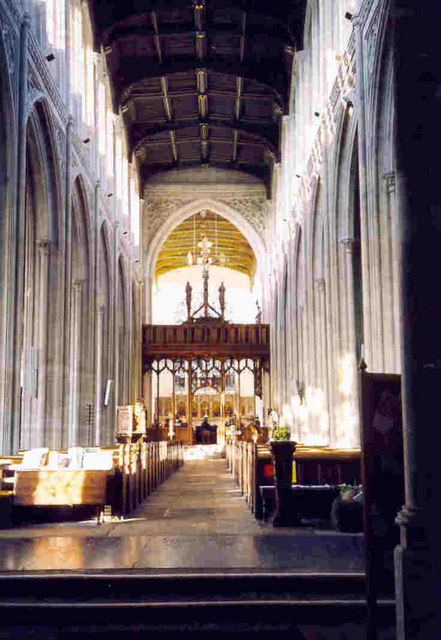
Interior

In 1769 the church was damaged by lightning. The repairs, carried out in the 1790s removed many medieval features but saved the building which was in a dilapidated state. The spire was added in 1832 to replace an older "lantern" tower to a design of Thomas Rickman and Henry Hutchinson.

Thomas Cornell, progenitor of the American family bearing his name, was baptized in the church around 1592.

The Conservative politician Rab Butler (1902–82) is buried in the churchyard. He promulgated the Education Act 1944.
