= Hanningfield Green =

Hamlet in Suffolk, England

Coordinates: 52.15°N 00.73°E

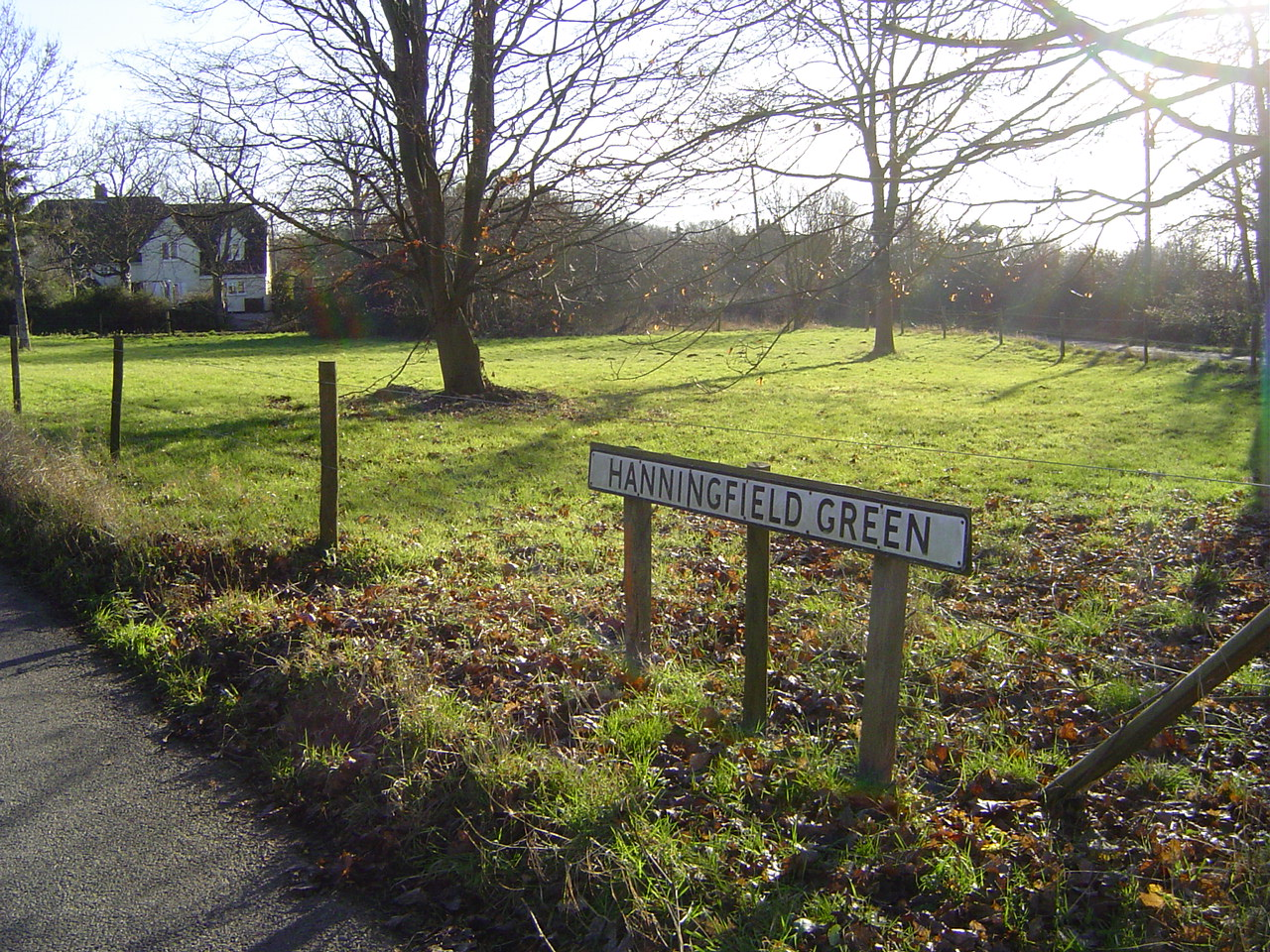
- Hanningfield Green – County Wildlife Site

- Location within Suffolk
- District: Babergh
- Shire county: Suffolk
- Region: East
- Country: England
- Sovereign state: United Kingdom
- Post town: Bury St Edmunds
- Postcode district: IP29

Hanningfield Green, sometimes referred to as Hanningfields Green, is a hamlet in the civil parish of Lawshall in the Babergh district in the county of Suffolk, England. It is located between The Street and Hibb's Green and is just under a mile off the A134 between Bury St Edmunds and Sudbury.

== History ==
Hanningfield Green was a medieval green that takes its name from the Hanningfield family, the manorial lords in the fourteenth century. The green covered an area between the two forked roads to All Saints Church and Hart's Green in the north-west and to Lawshall Green and Shimpling in the south-east.

Hanningfield Green and Hibb's Green were known as Halk Street in the 1567 Lawshall Survey, with Shimpling Road being referred to as Maltland Street. Henningfeld Greene is depicted on a map of 1611 and Faden's map of 1783 names it as Hinyfields Green. The green was partly enclosed in the nineteenth century.

At Hanningfield Green a length of moat (since infilled) is shown on the west side of Hanningfields Farm on the 1842 tithe map. This is the site of the manor house of "Henrfeildes" Manor that was recorded on a map of 1611. An Alicia de Hanigfeld is mentioned in 1327.

== Lawshall Evangelical Free Church ==
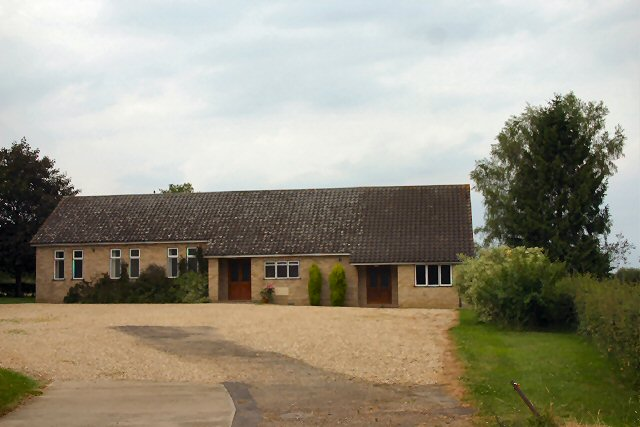
Lawshall Evangelical Free Church.

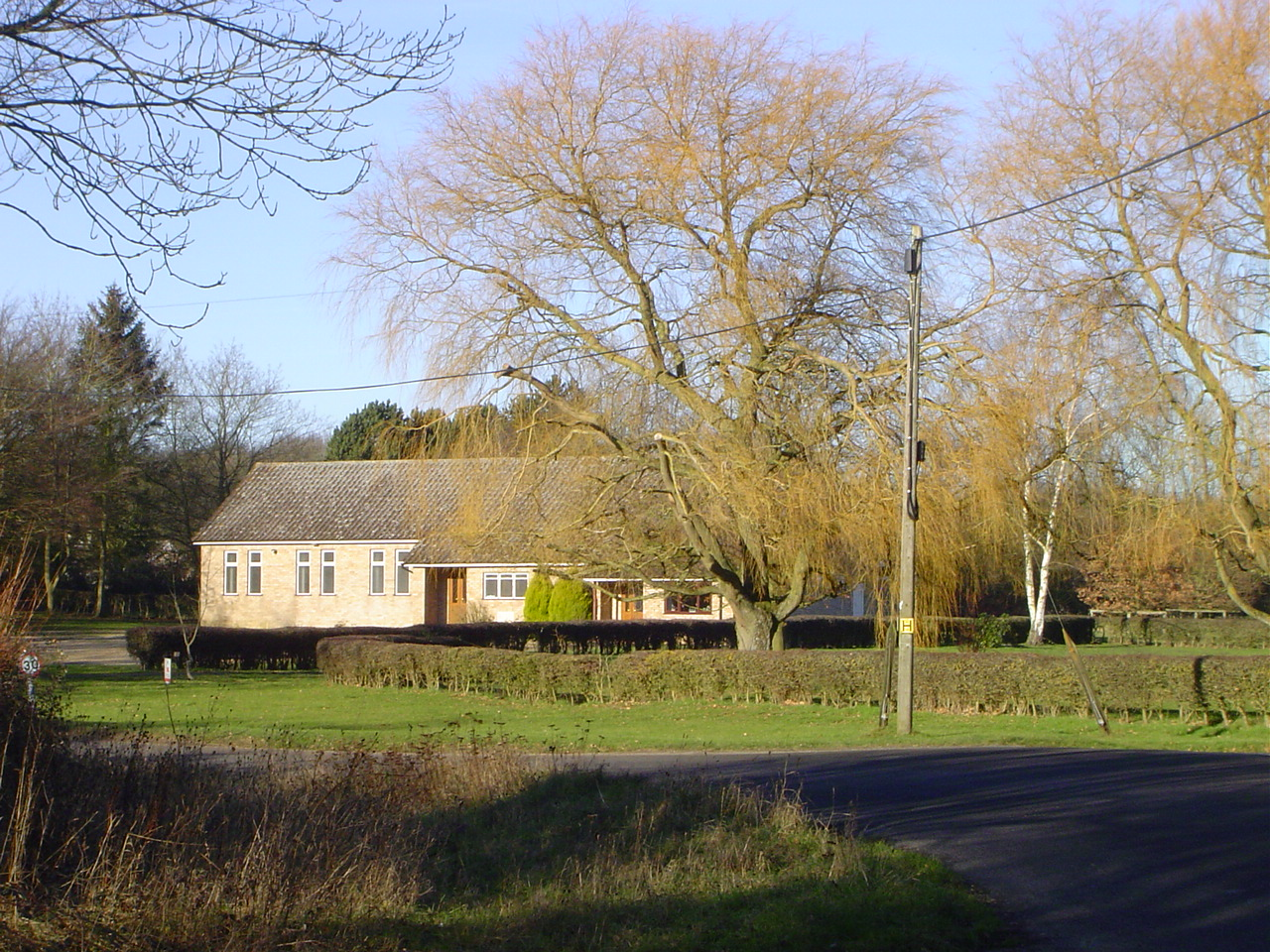
Setting of Lawshall Free Church

Lawshall Evangelical Free Church is located at Hanningfield Green. The church was born out of the desire of local Evangelical Christians in the village of Lawshall and the surrounding villages to undertake their own form of worship. Evangelistic activities by outside bodies (including The Faith Mission) resulted in some conversions and from about 1968 people met in various houses for worship and bible study. Eventually a legacy from the late Walter G Waspe of Lawshall Hall made financial provision for a new church which was opened for worship on 1 August 1970.

The initial accommodation comprised a chapel, vestry, kitchen and toilets. Further additions were made in 1978 with a hall and new toilet facilities. A baptistry was also incorporated in the hall for services entailing baptism by immersion.

In July 1976 the church appointed its first Pastor, David Bedford-Groom, who continued to minister and lead the church on a part-time basis for 12 years while continuing his profession as an accountant. In 1989 Michael Holmes, a retired building surveyor, took over as the full-time pastor until his retirement from the ministry in 1998. He was replaced by Pastor Antony Finnie in September 2000.

As a Free Church they have no authoritative body beyond the local congregation. The church is not isolationist and since 1996 they have been affiliated to the Fellowship of Independent Evangelical Churches.

== Designated County Wildlife Site ==
The triangular area of unimproved grassland between Hanningfield Green and Shimpling Road is parish land that has been designated as a County Wildlife Site in recognition of the range of native flora that grows there. At present Hanningfield Green is being managed as a hay meadow in the traditional manner. The essential requirements are a hay cut when the flowers have set seed and the removal of the cut material. A second cut is carried out in September.

Whilst the area may not represent the full range of Suffolk’s history and heritage, it contains one of the parish’s remaining species-rich grassland. In addition to the sight of buttercups on the green, there is quite a variety of broad leaved plants. These include blue bugle, pink cuckoo flower, edible common sorrel, cowslip, the strange adder's tongue and the occasional orchid.

Inevitably there is a period in July, prior to hay cut, when the green does not look at its best. It is a time of ripening seeds and it is therefore important not to cut down the plants in the name of tidiness at this crucial time.

== Listed buildings ==
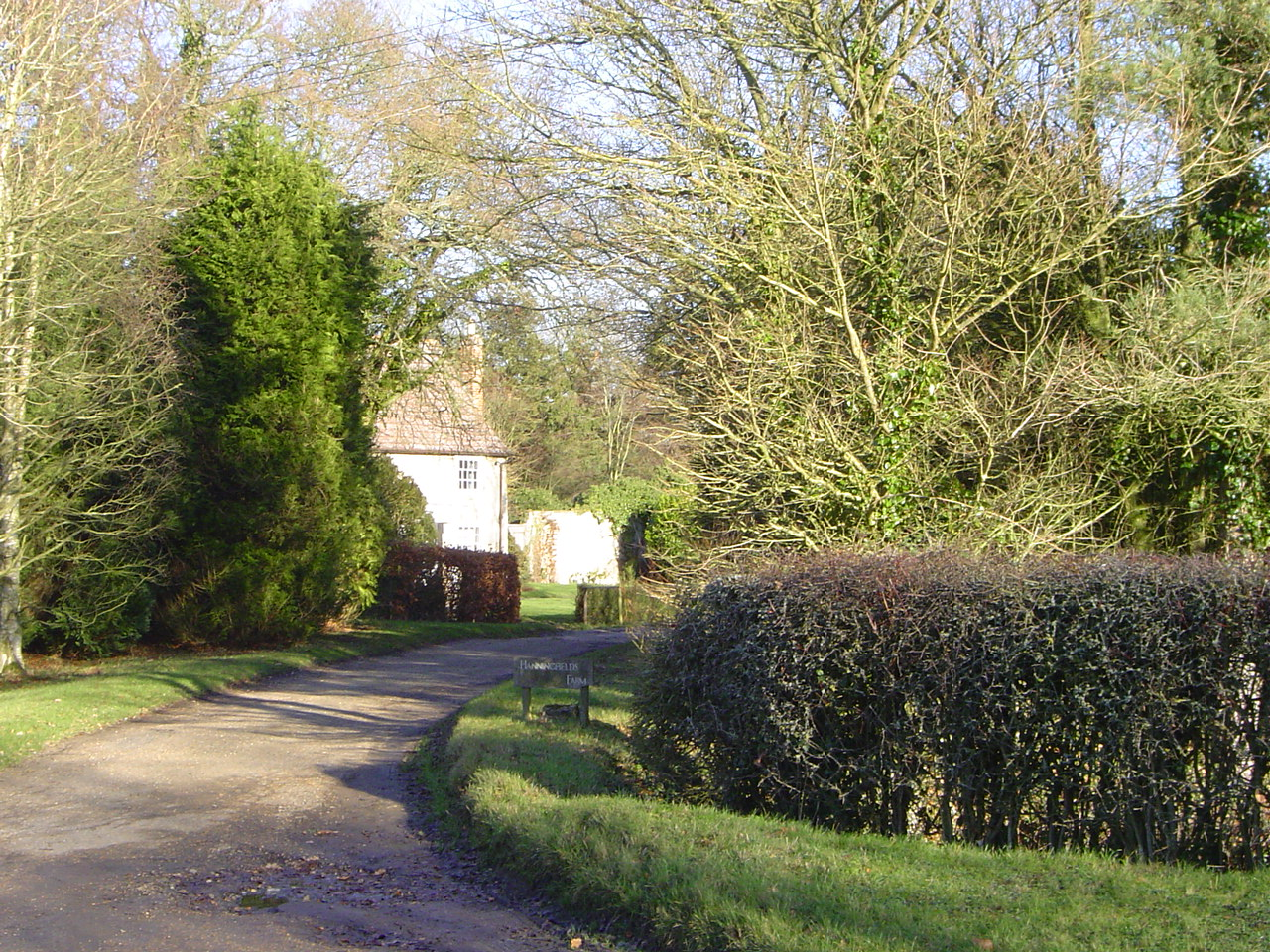
Entrance to Hanningfields Farm.

English Heritage lists one Grade II Listed building within the hamlet of Hanningfield Green:

- Hanningfields Farmhouse – This comprises two sixteenth/seventeenth century timber framed and plastered structures linked together, L-shaped on plan, making one large residence. The main facade was refaced in the late eighteenth century or early nineteenth century in yellow brick. The main entrance a Tuscan portico with plain columns and cornice. The roof is clad with twentieth century interlocking tiles. There is a central chimney stack with a sixteenth/seventeenth century hearth inside.

NB: The above property details represent the name and address that was used at the time that the building was listed. In some instances the name of the building may have changed over the intervening years.
