= Hart's Green =

Hamlet in Suffolk, England

Coordinates: 52.16°N 00.73°E

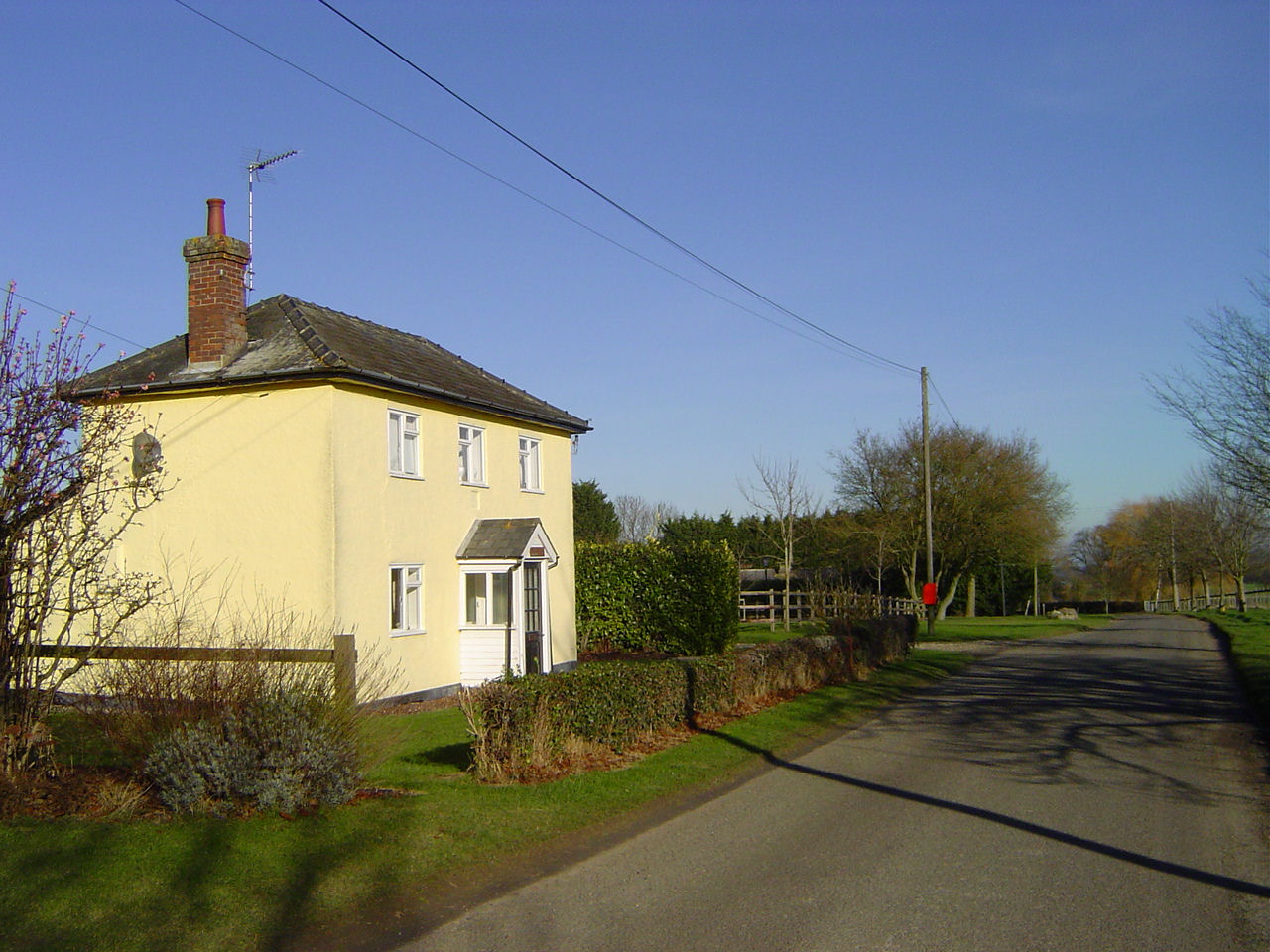
- Hart's Green

- Location within Suffolk
- District: Babergh
- Shire county: Suffolk
- Region: East
- Country: England
- Sovereign state: United Kingdom
- Post town: Bury St Edmunds
- Postcode district: IP29

Hart's Green is a hamlet in the civil parish of Lawshall in the Babergh District in the county of Suffolk, England. It is located between Stanningfield and Hanningfield Green and is just over a mile off the A134 between Bury St Edmunds and Sudbury. The road that serves Hart's Green is known as Donkey Lane.

== Previous names ==
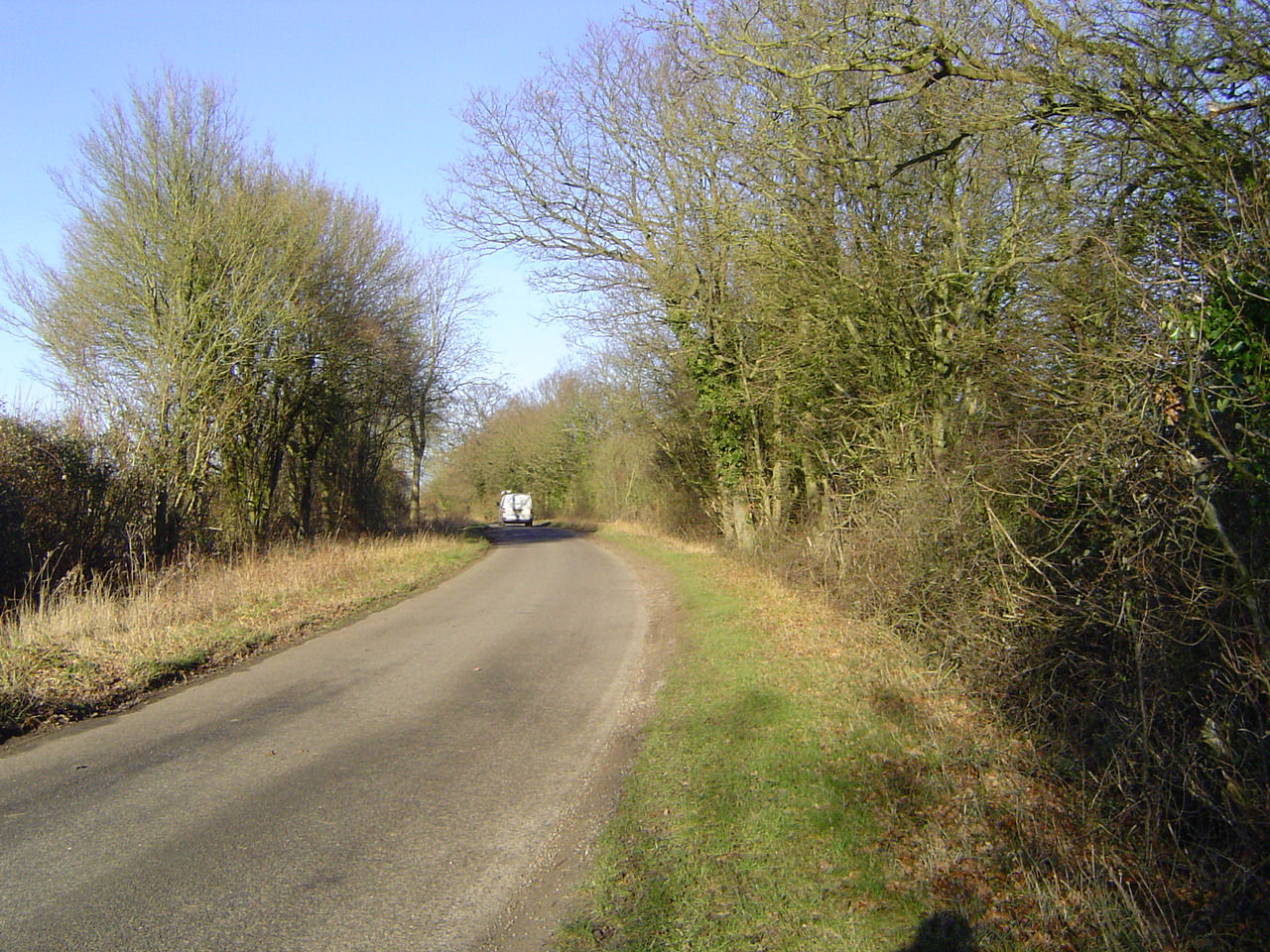
Donkey Lane

Donkey Lane was known as Bury Way/Street (and also Netherhall Street) in the 1567 Lawshall Survey. On the east side of Donkey Lane, south of Makin Farm, there is a farm track which was known as The Drift Lane. On the west side of Donkey Lane there was a track known as The Kitchen Lane that led from Carpenters Cottage (previously a public house) to Lawshall Hall.

== Listed buildings ==
English Heritage lists three Grade II Listed buildings within the hamlet of Hart's Green:

- Barfords – This is a sixteenth/seventeenth-century timber-framed and plastered house with eighteenth/nineteenth century external features and renovations in the twentieth century. A modern gabled porch projects at the west end and there is a former chapel at the east end. The house stands on a moated site. It was used as a girl's Roman Catholic day and boarding school from 1823 to 1868 when it was moved to accommodation next to the church in Bury Road.
- Cottage, Hart's Green – This is an eighteenth-century timber-framed and plastered house possibly incorporating an earlier frame, with a thatched roof and central chimney stack. The house is now divided into two dwellings.

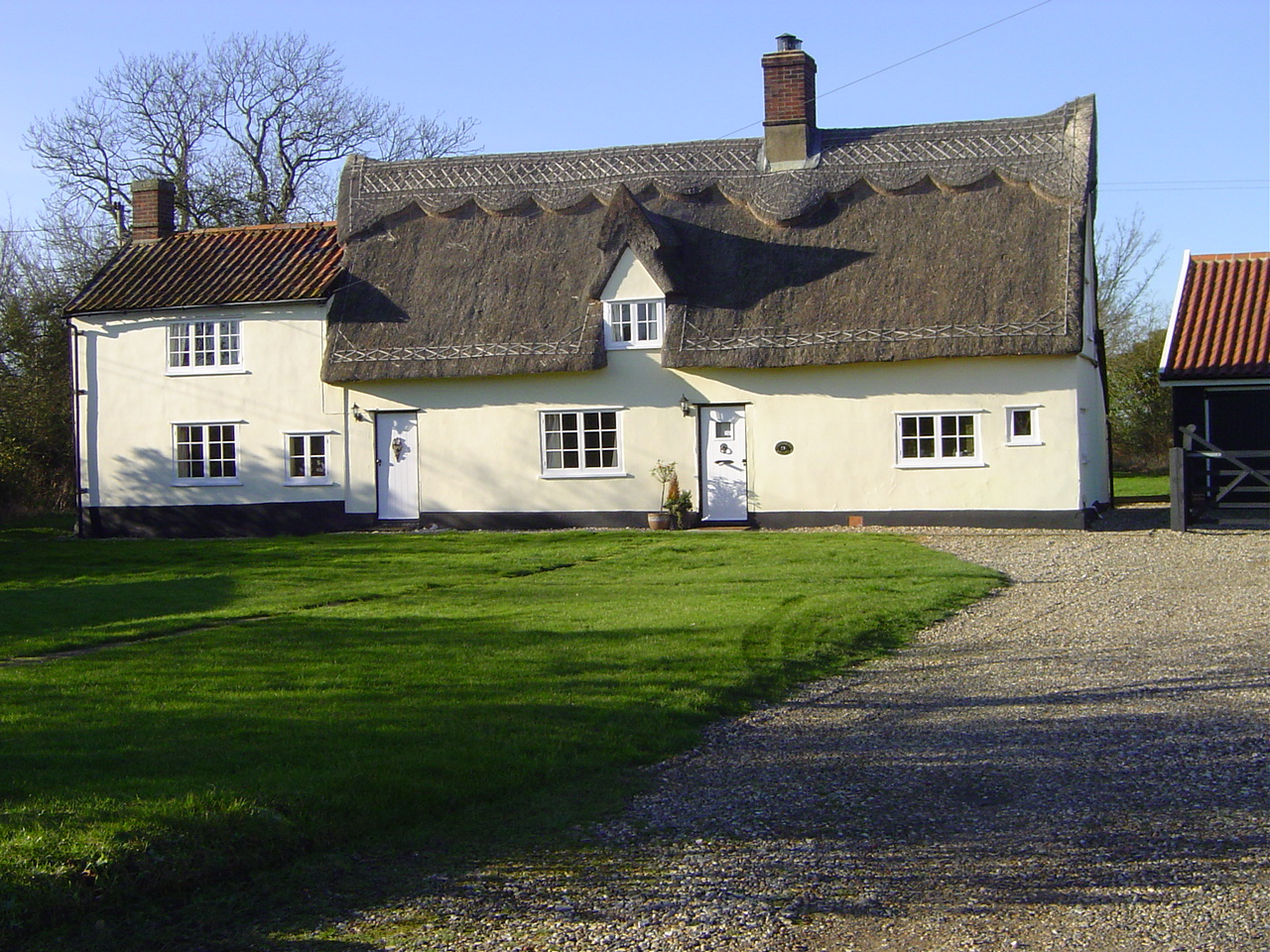
Carpenters Cottage – formerly the Carpenters Arms

- Carpenters Cottage – An eighteenth-century timber-framed and plastered house possibly incorporating an earlier frame, with a thatched and tiled roof and central chimney stack. Formerly it was a public house from 1865 to 1925, known as "The Carpenters Arms". In the room which used to be the bar there are coins nailed to the underside of the timber beams. It was the custom of soldiers during the Great War to nail up coins in this way and to reclaim them upon their return. Alas many of the coins were not reclaimed reflecting the loss of 24 men from the village.

It is not possible to provide a complete list of all the publicans (and residents) of the Swan or the verified dates when they took over or left the public house. However, with reference to the Official Census, White's Directory, Post Office Directory and other sources the following list is provided:

| Year(s) | Publicans (and residents) |
|---|---|
| 1869 | William Reeman |
| 1871–82 | William Allen |
| 1900–01 | Walter Cornish |
| 1911–12 | Walter Ransom |
| 1916–22 | Walter Leech |

NB: The above property details usually represent the names and addresses that were used at the time that the buildings were listed. In some instances the name of the building may have changed over the intervening years.
