= Listed buildings in Lawshall =

Civil Parish in Suffolk, England

Lawshall is a village and civil parish in the Babergh District of Suffolk, England. It contains 27 listed buildings that are recorded in the National Heritage List for England. Of these one is grade I, one is grade II* and 25 are grade II.

This list is based on the information retrieved online from Historic England.

== Key ==
Grade	Criteria
I	Buildings that are of exceptional interest
II*	Particularly important buildings of more than special interest
II	Buildings that are of special interest

== Listing ==
Name	Grade	Location	Type	Completed (Note: The date given is the date used by Historic England as significant for the initial building or that of an important part in the structure's description.)	Date designated	Grid ref. (Note: The grid reference is based on the British national grid reference system, sometimes known as OSGB36, used by the Ordnance Survey.) Geo-coordinates	Notes	Entry number (Note: The "List Entry Number" is a unique number assigned to each listed building and scheduled monument by Historic England.)	Image	Wikidata
Keepers Cottage	II				9 February 1978	TL8570655813; 52°10′10″N 0°42′51″E		1036588	Upload Photo	Q26288272
Newhouse Farmhouse	II				9 February 1978	TL8674353482; 52°08′53″N 0°43′41″E		1036587	Upload Photo	Q26288271
Trees Farmhouse	II				9 February 1978	TL8789254078; 52°09′11″N 0°44′42″E		1351804	Upload Photo	Q26634874
Coldham Cottage and the Roman Catholic Church of Our Lady Immaculate and St Joseph	II	Bury Road, IP29 4PL	church building		5 August 1998	TL8575455886; 52°10′12″N 0°42′53″E		1375999	Coldham Cottage and the Roman Catholic Church of Our Lady Immaculate and St Joseph More images	Q5142518
Elm House	II	Bury Road			4 October 1995	TL8555755414; 52°09′57″N 0°42′42″E		1258462	Upload Photo	Q26549694
Hills Farmhouse	II	Bury Road			9 February 1978	TL8560255487; 52°09′59″N 0°42′45″E		1181396	Upload Photo	Q26476718
Barfords	II	Donkey Lane			27 January 1984	TL8698855358; 52°09′53″N 0°43′57″E		1278803	Upload Photo	Q26568085
Carpenters Cottage	II	Donkey Lane, Harts Green			20 October 1977	TL8704955110; 52°09′45″N 0°44′00″E		1351805	Upload Photo	Q26634875
The Cottage and Harts Green Cottage	II	Donkey Lane, Bury St Edmunds, IP29 4QU			20 October 1977	TL8707155070; 52°09′44″N 0°44′01″E		1285009	Upload Photo	Q26573736
Hanningfields Farmhouse	II	Hanningfields Green			9 February 1978	TL8720154226; 52°09′16″N 0°44′06″E		1036590	Upload Photo	Q26288274
The Ryes	II	Harrow Green			9 February 1978	TL8597954518; 52°09′27″N 0°43′03″E		1036591	Upload Photo	Q26288275
Silver Farmhouse	II	Hibbs Green			10 January 1953	TL8753853801; 52°09′02″N 0°44′23″E		1036592	Upload Photo	Q26288276
Sunnyridge	II	Hibbs Green			9 February 1978	TL8776153845; 52°09′03″N 0°44′35″E		1284989	Upload Photo	Q26573717
Dales Farmhouse	II	Melford Road			18 January 2006	TL8538354133; 52°09′16″N 0°42′30″E		1391358	Upload Photo	Q26670723
Little West Farm	II	Melford Road			23 February 2006	TL8520154408; 52°09′25″N 0°42′21″E		1391517	Upload Photo	Q26670876
Pond Cottage	II	The Green			9 February 1978	TL8791253839; 52°09′03″N 0°44′43″E		1036589	Upload Photo	Q26288273
The Howes	II	The Green			9 February 1978	TL8794553839; 52°09′03″N 0°44′45″E		1285014	Upload Photo	Q26573741
Amber Cottage	II	The Street, Bury St Edmunds, IP29 4QA			9 February 1978	TL8660754227; 52°09′17″N 0°43′35″E		1285002	Upload Photo	Q26573730
Bowaters and Shepherds Cottage	II	The Street			9 February 1978	TL8651454208; 52°09′17″N 0°43′30″E		1036595	Upload Photo	Q26288277
Church House	II	The Street			9 February 1978	TL8645154199; 52°09′16″N 0°43′27″E		1181466	Upload Photo	Q26476785
Church of All Saints	I	The Street	church building		23 March 1961	TL8643654260; 52°09′18″N 0°43′26″E		1036594	Church of All Saints More images	Q4729487
Fox Cottage	II	The Street			9 February 1999	TL8699554225; 52°09′17″N 0°43′55″E		1245578	Upload Photo	Q26538095
Lawshall Hall	II*	The Street	house		10 January 1953	TL8633354290; 52°09′20″N 0°43′21″E		1036593	Lawshall Hall More images	Q6504937
Post Office	II	The Street			9 February 1978	TL8653254222; 52°09′17″N 0°43′31″E		1036596	Upload Photo	Q26288278
Street Farmhouse	II	The Street			9 February 1978	TL8662854230; 52°09′17″N 0°43′36″E		1036597	Upload Photo	Q26288280
Swan Inn	II	The Street	inn		9 February 1978	TL8670754245; 52°09′18″N 0°43′40″E		1181489	Swan Inn More images	Q26476808

== See also ==
- Grade I listed buildings in Suffolk
- Grade II* listed buildings in Suffolk

== Sources ==
- Bettely, James; Pevsner, Nikolaus (2015) [1961], Suffolk: West, The Buildings of England, New Haven and London: Yale University Press, ISBN 978-0-300-19655-9
