= Ulmus minor 'Betulaefolia' =

Elm cultivar

- Species: Ulmus minor
- Cultivar: 'Betulaefolia'

The Field Elm cultivar Ulmus minor 'Betulaefolia' (:'birch-leaved') is a tree of uncertain origin. An U. betulaefolia was listed by Loddiges of Hackney, London, in the catalogue of 1836, an U. campestris var. betulaefolia by Loudon in Arboretum et Fruticetum Britannicum (1838), and an U. betulifolia Booth by the Lawson nursery of Edinburgh (from 1838). Henry described an U. campestris var. betulaefolia at Kew in 1913, obtained from Fulham nurseryman Osborne in 1879, as "scarcely different from var. viminalis " (U. minor 'Viminalis'). Melville considered the tree so named at Kew a form of his U. × viminalis, while Bean (1988), describing U. 'Betulaefolia', likewise discussed it in his U. 'Viminalis' section, as an apparently allied tree. Loudon and Browne had noted that some forms of 'Viminalis' can be mistaken for a variety of birch. An U. campestris betulaefolia was distributed by Hesse's Nurseries, Weener, Germany, in the 1930s.

Henry (1913) also described an U. nitens var. betulaefolia , a cultivar with long, narrow un-birchlike leaves, a herbarium specimen of which from Audley End, Suffolk, is preserved at Kew. Henry did not include this cultivar, represented by a specimen in the Cambridge University Botanic Garden, as a form of 'Viminalis', but both he and Green took it to be a synonym of Loudon's 'Betulaefolia'. Melville determined this tree a triple hybrid, U. carpinifolia gled. × U. plotii Druce × U. glabra Huds..

== Description ==
Loudon's U. campestris var. betulaefolia was distinguished by its leaves "somewhat resembling common birch". Wesmael's (1863) Ulmus campestris var. nuda subvar. betulaefolia Hort. Vilv. had sharp-pointed double teeth. Bean's U. 'Betulaefolia' was an "elegant" tree with pendulous young branchlets, leaves narrowly obovate, 2–2.5 in. by 1.5, rough above, downy in the vein-axils beneath, with deeply toothed margins, the teeth being narrow, incurved, and often double. Rehder (1938) described 'Betulaefolia' as "a tree of pyramidal habit with ascending branches and elliptic to elliptic-oblong leaves 4 to 8 cm long, narrowed towards the unequal base".

Henry's . U. nitens var. betulaefolia was "a pyramidal tree with ascending branches, with leaves up to 4 in. by 1.5 in., long-acuminate at the apex and narrowing towards a cuneate but unequal base".

== Pests and diseases ==
Trees of Melville's U. × viminalis hybrid group, if such the cultivar 'Betulaefolia' was, are very susceptible to Dutch elm disease.

== Cultivation ==
No specimens of 'Betulaefolia' are known to survive. There was a specimen at Kew Gardens in the late 19th and early 20th century, obtained from Osborne (1879). An U. campestris var. betulaefolia, obtained from Hesse's nursery, Germany, in the 1920s, stood in Morton Arboretum, Illinois. A second tree there, cloned from this and grafted, was renamed Ulmus carpinifolia Gled. cv. 'Betulaefolia', and was still present in the 1990s. It was described as an "irregular" tree, 55 ft tall and 30 ft wide, with fissured grey-brown bark and smooth brown twigs. Arnold Arboretum had a specimen of Ulmus foliacea Gilibert [: U. minor] 'Betulaefolia' in the mid-20th century.

== Synonymy ==
- Ulmus betulöides: Booth, Floetbeck nurseries, Hamburg (1838).
- Ulmus campestris var. nuda subvar. betulaefolia Hort. Vilv.: Wesmael (1863)
