= Green Light Trust =

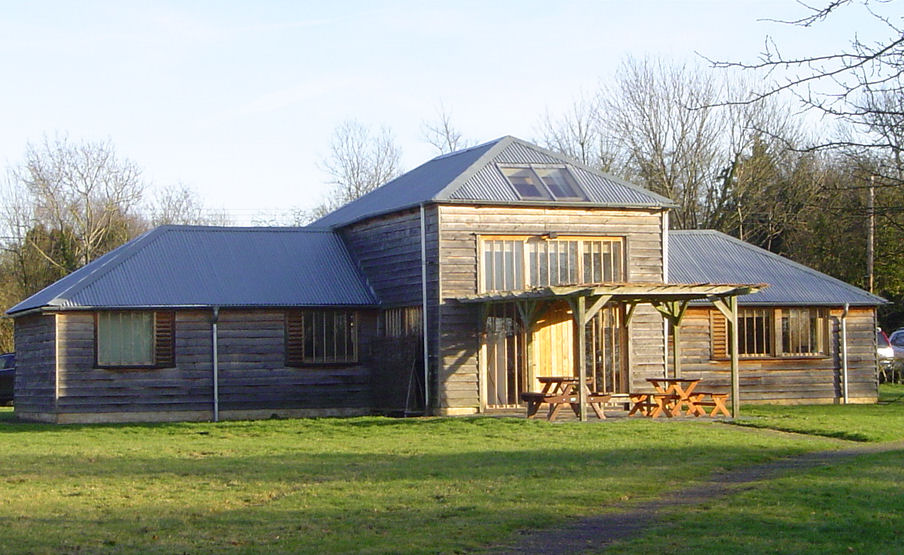
- The Foundry - The Green Light Trust's headquarters in Lawshall, Suffolk.
- Founded: 1989
- Founder: Nigel Hughes; Ric Edelmann
- Type: Registered charity
- Registration no.: 1000977
- Purpose: Environmental education
- Location(s): The Foundry, Bury Road, Lawshall, Bury St Edmunds, Suffolk, IP29 4PJ UK
- Coordinates: 52.1658°N 0.7117°E
- Website: www.greenlighttrust.org

The Green Light Trust is an environmental and educational charity whose mission is to bring communities and landscapes to life through 'hands-on' learning and the growing of woodlands.

== Overview ==
The Green Light Trust has existed for 20 years. It has a long-term relationship with remote rainforest dwellers in Papua New Guinea.

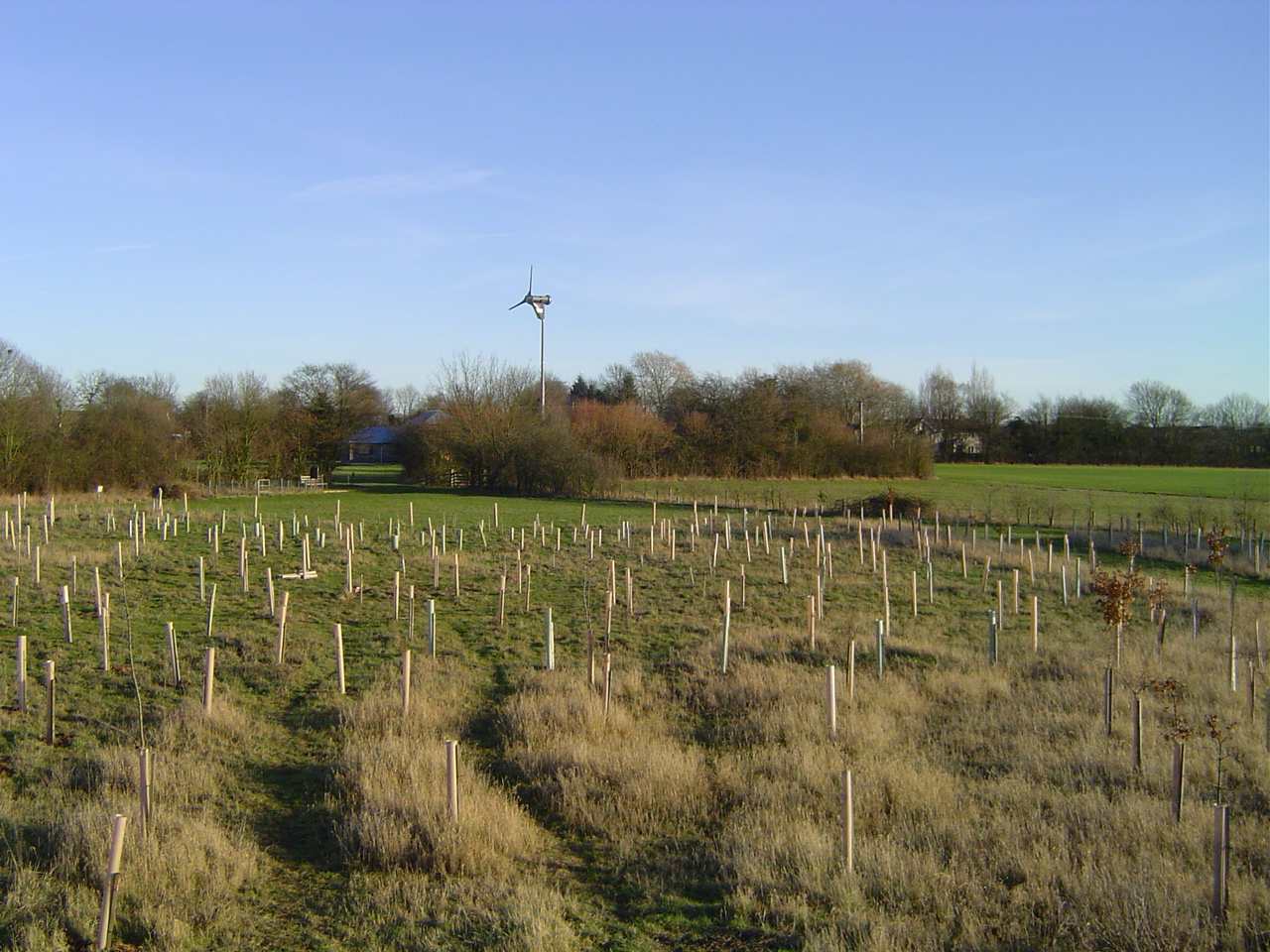
Golden Wood, Lawshall - with The Foundry and its wind turbine in the background.

The mission of the Trust is to bring communities and landscapes to life through 'hands-on' learning and the growing of woodlands. With independence and self-sufficiency as the goal, it works with both urban and rural communities to find land, design, plant, manage and own its woodland projects.

The Trust also provides education for sustainable development through local action and global citizenship. Its work in schools involves pupils from early years to the sixth form; activities include gathering seeds and caring for forests to develop experience and values of environmental conservation.

It is based in its headquarters in Lawshall at the Foundry, a carbon neutral building. The Trust has nearly 60 rural and urban community-owned woodland projects in 8 counties throughout the East of England Region with others in Yorkshire, Kent and London. Around 70 hectares of land are now under community management and it has over 1000 volunteers with over 3000 children engaged in continual school programmes.

The organisation began in 1993. Its overall goal is now to build a unique patchwork of rejuvenated landscapes and communities, to initiate 200 projects and impact 100,000 children.

=== Forest for Our Children ===
Forest for Our Children was the Trust's first Community-owned WildSpace project. Based near the Trust's headquarters in Lawshall, Forest for Our Children is 9 hectares of land made up of 2 woods in the parish. Crooked Wood was planted in 1993 and Golden Wood between 1994 and 2010.

=== Community-owned WildSpace Scheme ===
The Green Light Trust's Community-owned WildSpace Scheme was started in 2001 with a unique funding partnership from B&Q, Forestry Commission and Suffolk County Council. Working in partnership with local communities, Green Light has helped to establish nearly 60 rural and urban projects in 8 counties (including 2 business WildSpaces in Oxford and Cambridge.

== Children and education ==
The Trust runs a number of school programmes for children and courses for adults working in education.

The Trust promotes forest schools, a Scandinavian education programme promoting woodland-based classrooms in which children attend lessons outdoors and are encouraged to explore the environment.

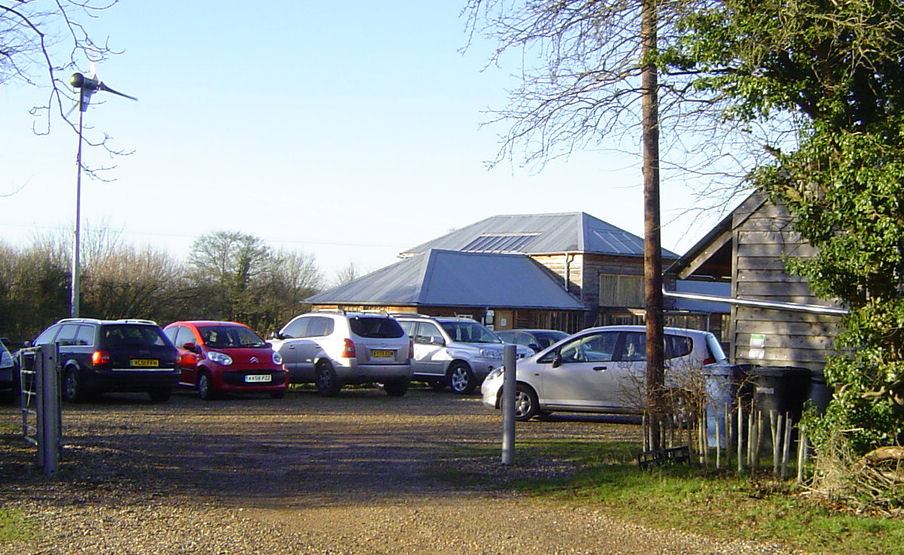
The Foundry - venue for meetings.

== The Foundry ==
The Foundry is the Green Light Trust's headquarters and training centre set in 2.5 acres of meadowland at Bury Road, Lawshall. In 2006, The Foundry was awarded an RIBA Sustainability Award. Built using "deep green" construction methods, it is a carbon neutral building that aims to be as autonomous as possible.

The Foundry was originally an 1840s threshing barn transformed into a traction engine maintenance shed in the 1880s. It later became a forge and foundry between 1920 and 1950. Abandoned for 50 years, the Green Light Trust decided to make The Foundry its headquarters as well as an example of sustainable building in East Anglia. Work began on 27 May 2005 and a year later the self-sufficient and carbon-neutral building was completed.

== See also ==
- Teach the Future
