= The Warbanks =

Archaeological site in Suffolk, England

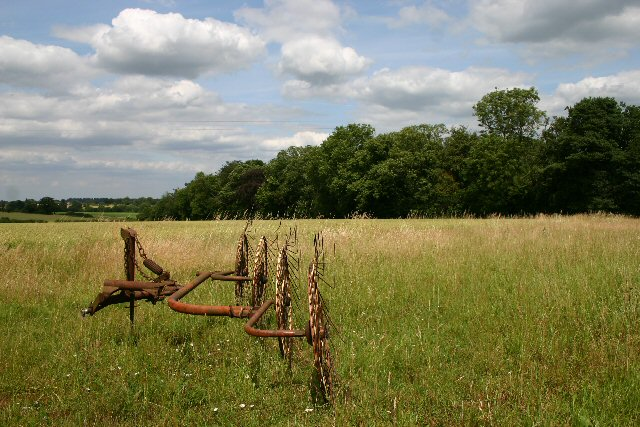
The Warbanks

The Warbanks are an archaeological site comprising irregular earthworks that straddle the A134 in the Suffolk parishes of Lawshall, Cockfield and Shimpling.

== Features ==
The Warbanks are ancient defensive ditches that are situated on the eastern parish boundary of Lawshall and extend into the neighbouring parishes of Cockfield and Shimpling. They are of very ancient origin and comprise long ramparts and ditches crossed by a Roman road (now the A134) running between Alpheton and Bradfield Combust, just north of Thorn Corner. It was formerly a single defensive system but there are now three parts, the Lawshall section being the most prominent. Dense timber on either flank on the flat heavy boulder clay along with the ramparts of the Warbanks would have made this a notable military post.

The Warbanks were certainly pre-Roman and may have been an earlier defence system. A late Bronze Age sword (now in the Moyse's Hall Museum in Bury St Edmunds) was found on the site of the Warbanks and has been dated as 800-600BC and could give a clue to the age of the banks.

A small bronze bust of a woman was found within the earthworks. The hair of the woman is plaited in twelve twists and fastened on the top of the head with a bow and there is also the bronze handle of a knife or mirror with a crowned female head at the end. Neothlithic implements have also been found in the Warbanks.

== Key dates ==
Suffolk County Council's Archaeological Service have identified the following:

1581: Section (b) named Le Barowe.
1834/4: Tithe Map: Section named as War Bank (wood).
1842: Named as War Bank on Tithe Map of Lawshall.
1978: The area was still being ploughed with the Warbanks just visible.
1998: Whole area of the Warbanks east of the A134 was metal detected with negative results.
