= Hibb's Green =

Hamlet in Suffolk, England

Coordinates: 52.14°N 00.73°E

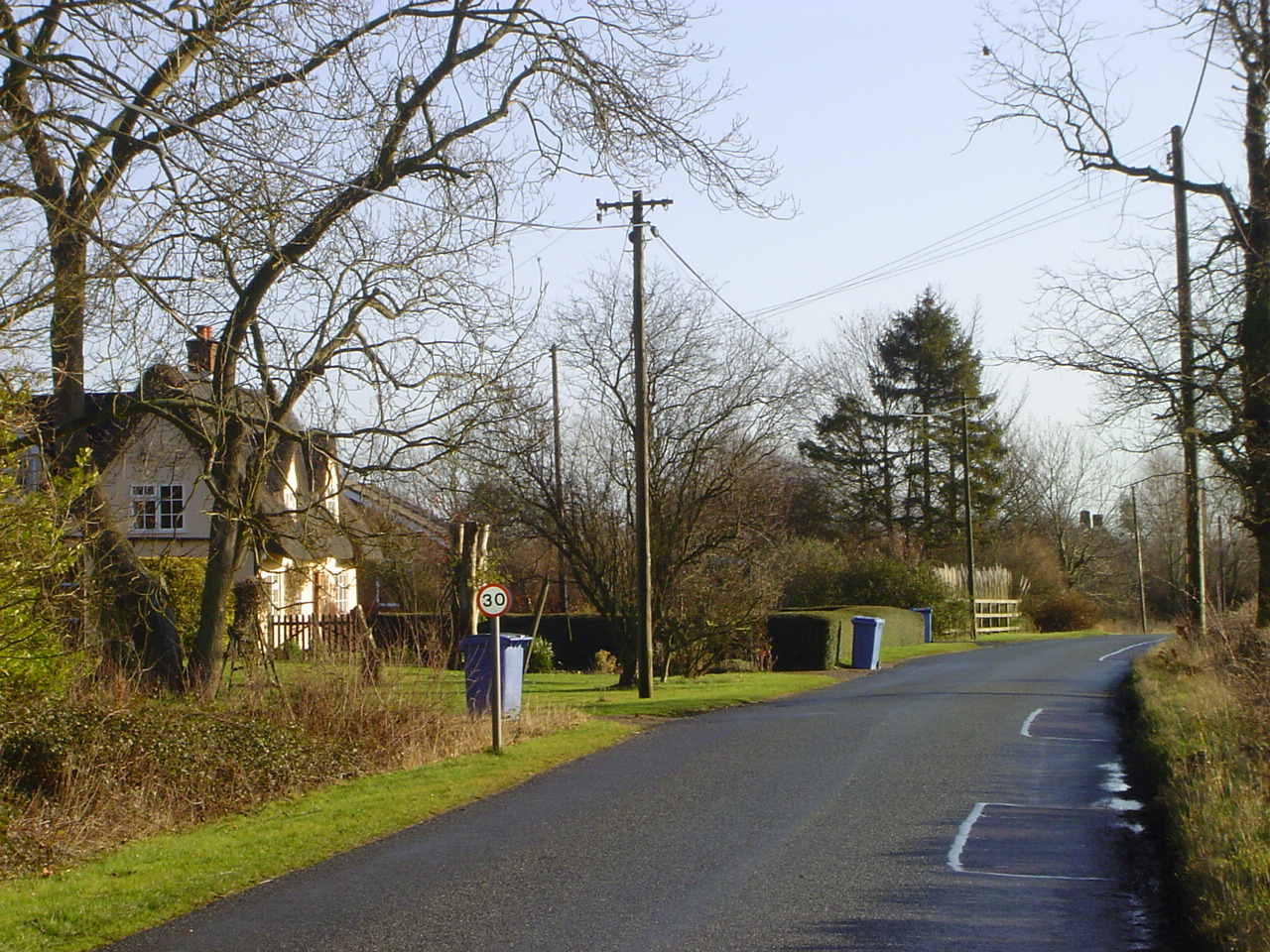

- Location within Suffolk
- Civil parish: Lawshall
- District: Babergh
- Shire county: Suffolk
- Region: East
- Country: England
- Sovereign state: United Kingdom
- Post town: Bury St Edmunds
- Postcode district: IP29

Hibb's Green is a hamlet in the civil parish of Lawshall in the Babergh district in the county of Suffolk, England. It is located between Hanningfield Green and Lawshall Green and is just under a mile off the A134 between Bury St Edmunds and Sudbury.

== Previous name ==
Hanningfield Green and Hibb's Green were known as Halk Street in the 1567 Lawshall Survey.

== Listed buildings ==
English Heritage lists two Grade II Listed buildings within the hamlet of Hibb's Green:

- Silver Farmhouse – The property was formerly known as Paradise Farm. It is a sixteenth/seventeenth-century timber-framed and plastered house with a cross wing at the east end, with eighteenth-century alterations. The upper storey of the cross wing is jettied on brackets on the north front and is weatherboarded. The roof and part of the walls are covered with cedar shingles. A glazed porch at the front has eighteenth-century semi-circular headed windows. There is a central chimney stack with a grouped diagonal shaft.
- Sunnyridge – This is an eighteenth/nineteenth-century clay lump cottage with a thatched roof having two large gabled dormer windows. There is a substantial twentieth-century extension at the rear.

NB: The above property details usually represent the names and addresses that were used at the time that the buildings were listed. In some instances the name of the building may have changed over the intervening years.
