= Audley End, Suffolk =

Hamlet in Suffolk, England

Coordinates: 52.14°N 00.70°E

Audley End
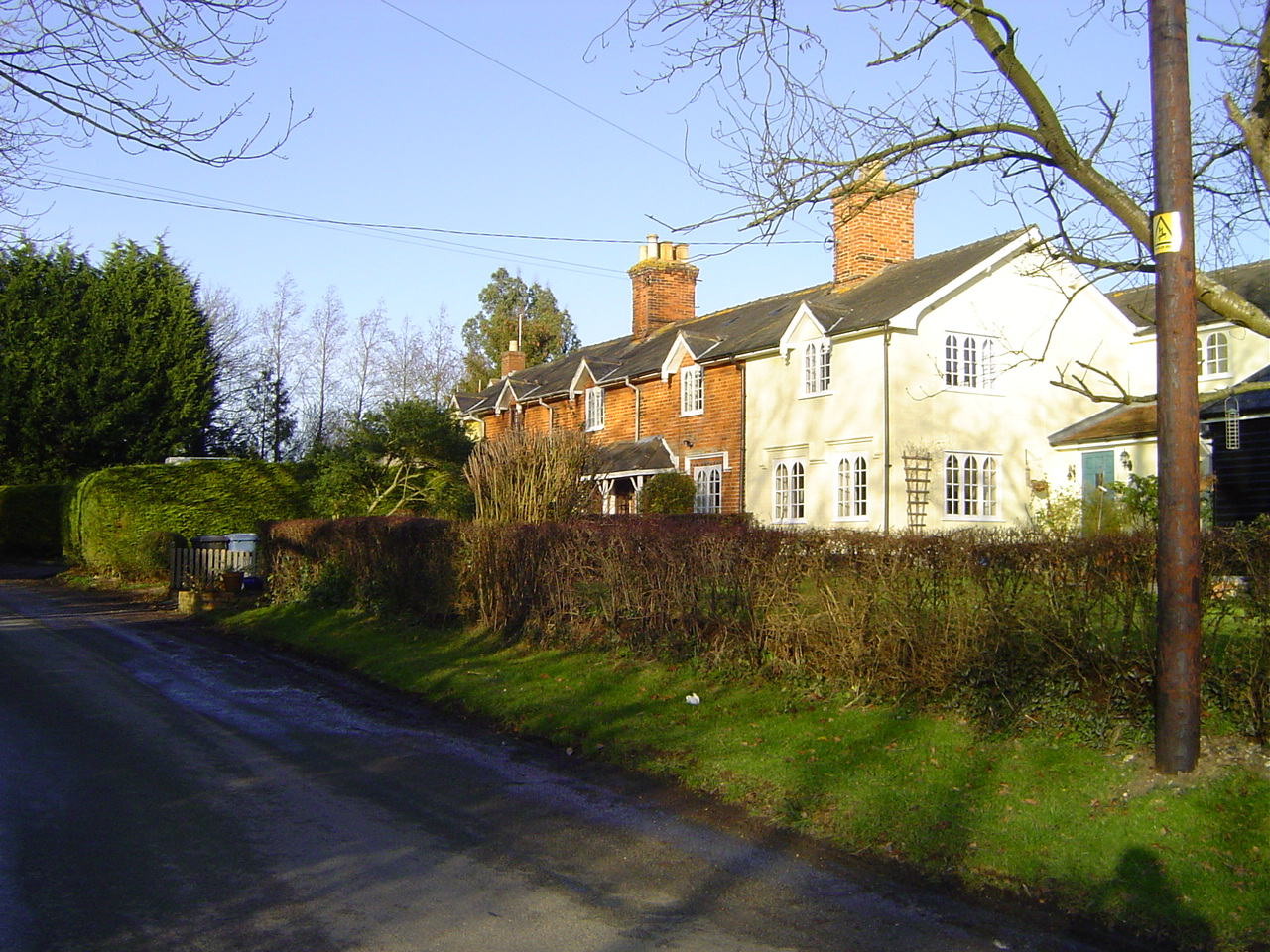

- Location within Suffolk
- District: Babergh
- Shire county: Suffolk
- Region: East
- Country: England
- Sovereign state: United Kingdom
- Post town: Bury St Edmunds
- Postcode district: IP29

Audley End is a hamlet in the civil parish of Lawshall in the Babergh district in the county of Suffolk, England. It is located between Lambs Lane and Chadacre Hall and is around two miles (3 kilometres) off the A134 between Bury St Edmunds and Sudbury. Ashen Wood is nearby where the parish gallows were located.
