= Lawshall =

Coordinates: 52.1549°N 0.7248°E

- Village and civil parish
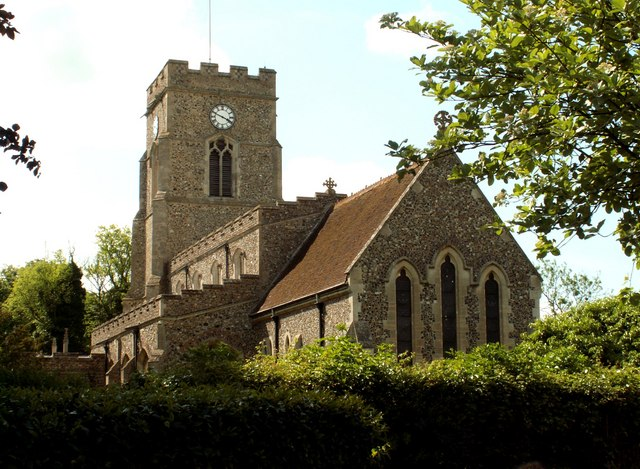
- All Saints church, Lawshall

- Location within Suffolk
- Population: 968 (Including Ickworth. 2011)
- District: Babergh
- Shire county: Suffolk
- Region: East
- Country: England
- Sovereign state: United Kingdom
- Post town: Bury St Edmunds
- Postcode district: IP29

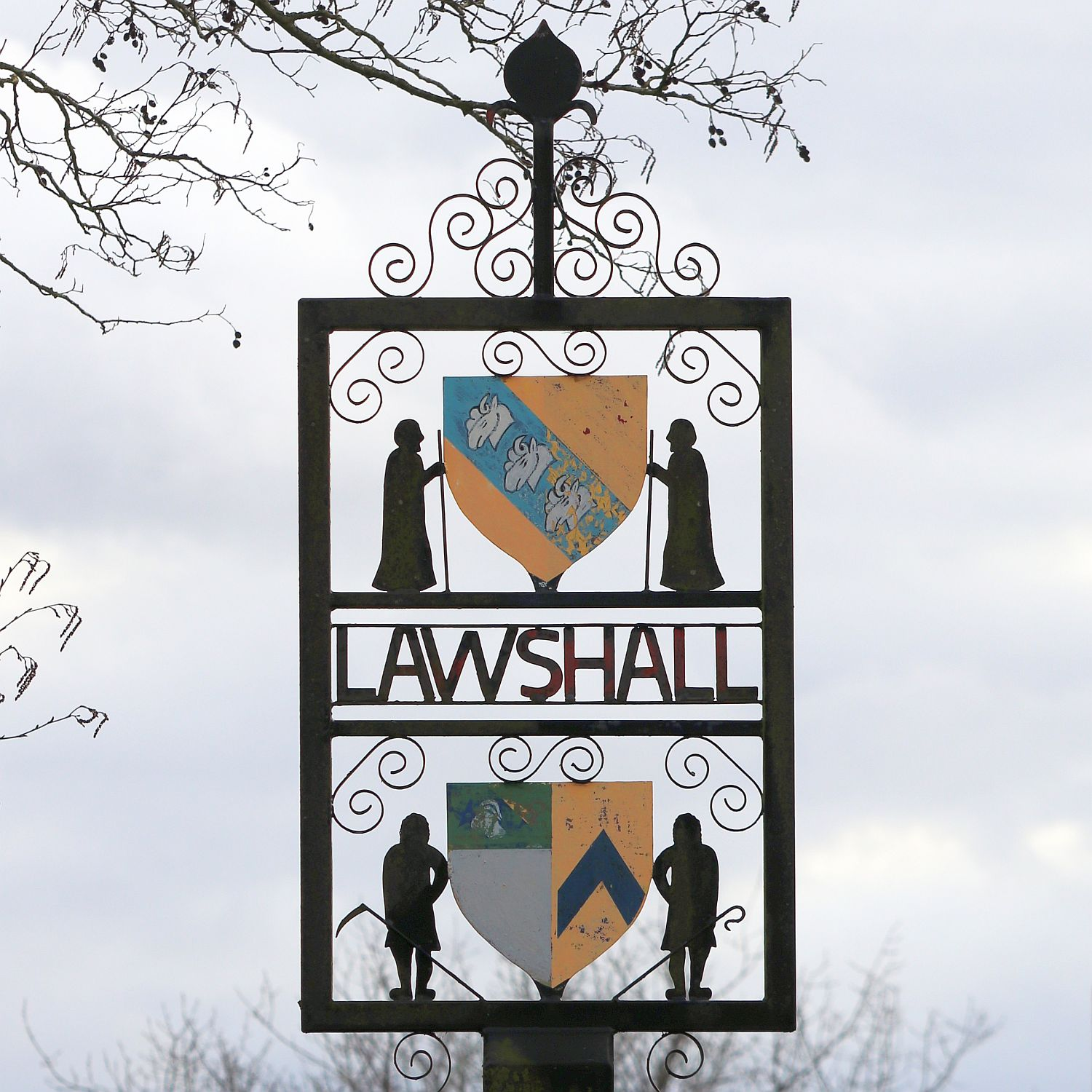
Lawshall Village Sign

Lawshall is a village and civil parish in Suffolk, England. Located around a mile off the A134 between Bury St Edmunds and Sudbury, it is part of Babergh district. The parish has nine settlements comprising the three main settlements of The Street, Lambs Lane and Bury Road along with the six small hamlets of Audley End, Hanningfield Green, Harrow Green, Hart's Green, Hibb's Green and Lawshall Green.

Notable buildings in the parish include All Saints Church and Lawshall Hall. In addition Coldham Hall is very close to the village and part of the grounds of the estate are located within the parish. Other important features include Frithy Wood, which is classified as Ancient Woodland and a designated Site of Special Scientific Interest (SSSI), and The Warbanks historical site.

== Etymology ==
The village was originally known as "Hlaw-gesella" which meant the shelter or hut on a hill or high ground. Early records indicate that in later years the name was recorded as "Laushella" (972), "Lawesselam" (1086), "Laveshel" (1095), "Laweshell" (1194) and "Laugesale" (1253). Other names identified in the County of Suffolk records include Lausel, Lausele, Lausell, Lauselle, Laushalle, Laushill, Laushille, Laushull, Laushulle, Lausill, Lawcell, Laweshill, Laweshille, Lawishille, Lawsall, Lawschyll, Lawsele and Lawsell.

== History ==
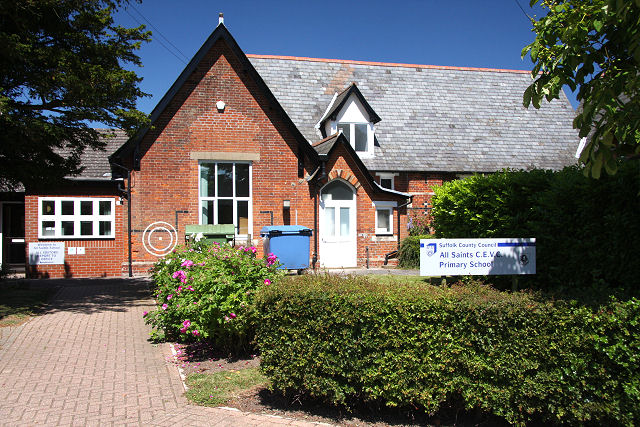
All Saints Primary School: the centre of the village

=== Background ===
The village of Lawshall is dispersed in nature with an extremely scattered distribution of houses and groups of houses. There are three main centres of settlement within the parish, these being The Street (the area around the Church and Village School extending towards Swanfield), Lambs Lane (including The Glebe, Shepherds Drive and Windsor Drive) and the linear development along Bury Road. In addition there are six small hamlets comprising Audley End, Hanningfield Green, Harrow Green, Hart's Green, Hibb's Green and Lawshall Green.

The centre of the village is recognised as the area around All Saints church and the primary school.

=== Early records ===
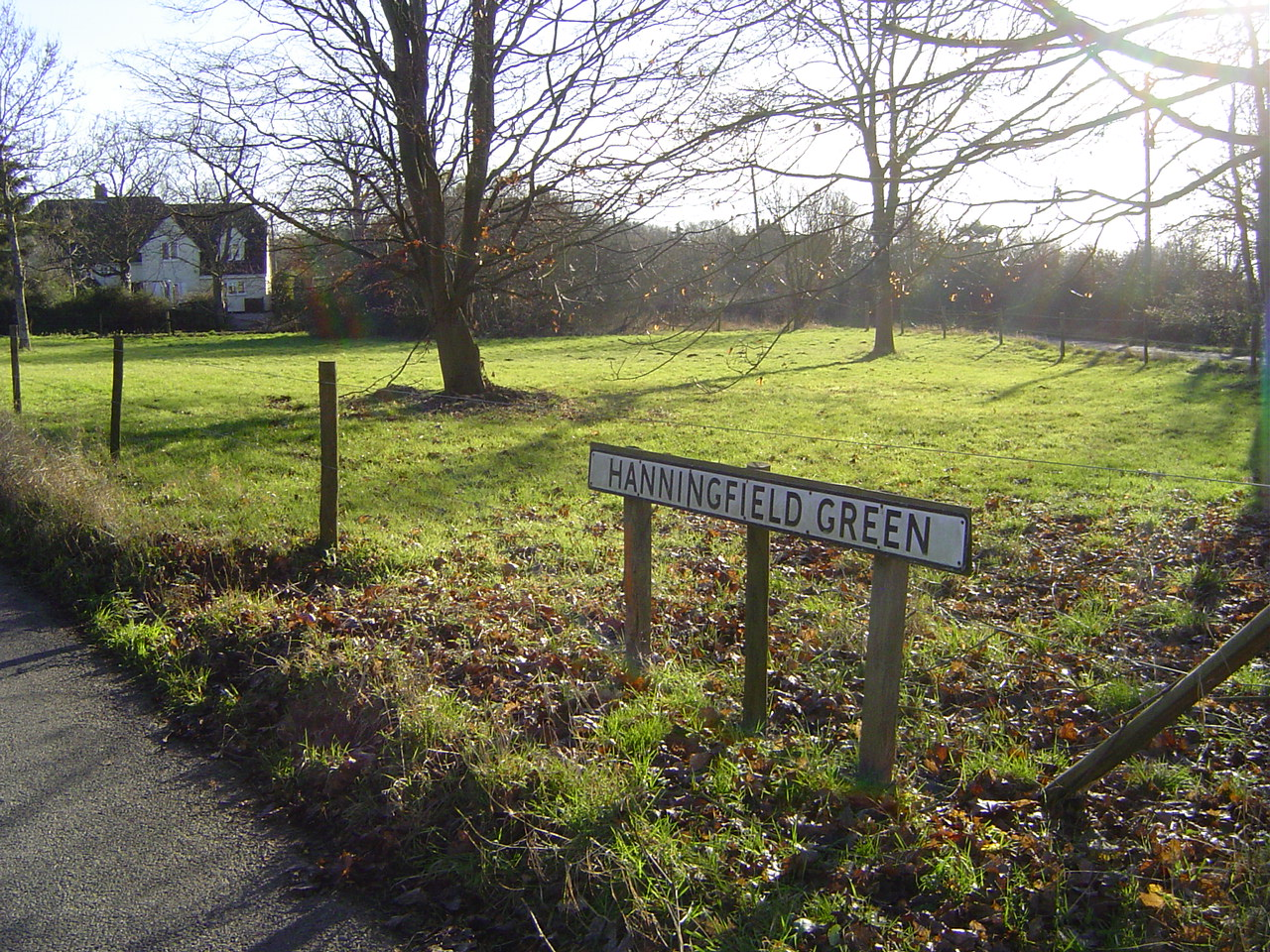
Hanningfield Green - possible site of Bronze Age settlement

The earliest documentary record for the village dates from approximately 972AD. However, it seems highly probable that there was a settlement within the parish well before this time. The present centre of the village is unlikely to have been the site of the original settlement as the basic requirement for a reliable supply of water would have precluded the area around the church. Hanningfield Green has been suggested as a stronger possibility for the site of the original Bronze Age settlement but another location could have been somewhere along the Chad Brook although none of the early records gives the exact location. Morley suggests that the original settlement place was beside the stream near Coldham Hall.

The earliest evidence of man in the parish can be identified in the now nearly ploughed out Warbanks which were certainly pre-Roman and may have been an earlier defence system. A late Bronze Age sword (now in the Moyse's Hall Museum in Bury St Edmunds) was found on the site of the Warbanks and has been dated as 800-600BC and could give a clue to the age of the bank.

Around 972 Alwinus, son of Bricius, was Lord of the Manor. Alwinus joined the monastery of Ramsey in Huntingdonshire and surrendered his manor to the Abbot. This was duly recorded in the Ramsey Chronicle and represents the first documentary evidence of Laushella (Lawshall). The land was to remain with the Ramsey Abbey until about 1534.

=== Medieval period ===
Lawshall was recorded in the Domesday Book (1086) and the entry for the parish states "St Benedict held Lawshall as a Manor with eight caracutes of land". The parish held the following: 16 villagers, 10 smallholders and 5 slaves with 3 ploughs in Lordship and 10 men's ploughs. There was an 8 acre meadow, 1 cob, 10 cattle, 30 pigs, 100 sheep and 12 goats; Value £12. Also a church and 30 acres of free land.

There is documentary evidence that the Abbot of Ramsey still controlled the manor with an agreement drawn up between the Abbot and William Herberd in 1269. The agreement required Herberd to provide for the widow of Alexander Hemning, the tenant of Lawshall Hall, and her two sons. Herberd was to "maintain the sons and land in as good or better state than when he first had access to the wife of Alexander". There is a possible link with a current parish place name as Herberd could have had connections with the current Herberts Farm.

In the 1327 list of Subsidy Returns for Lawshall 38 names were mentioned and it is assumed that the subsidy was only levied on people in the parish with a degree of wealth. Names listed in the return that can still be recognised in today's place names (shown in parentheses) include Roberto Herbard (Herberts Farm), Alicia de Hanningfield (Hanningfield Green) and Johanne de Rownei (Rowney Farm).

=== Early Modern period ===
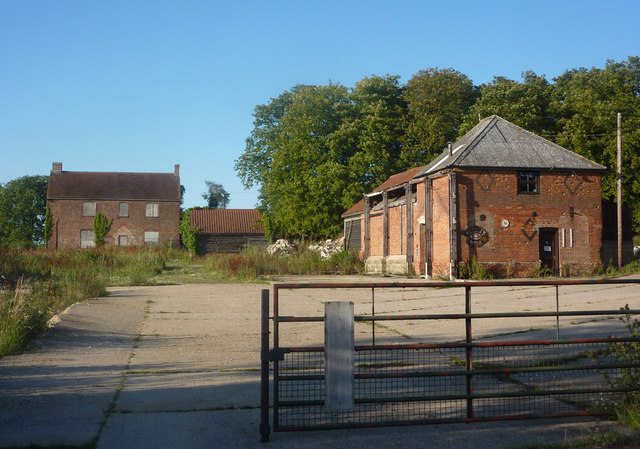
Lawshall Hall

After the Dissolution of the Monasteries in 1534 the Manor of Lawshall, including Lawshall Hall, was granted to John Rither for 13 years and then in 1547 was sold to Sir William Drury. The Drurys of Hawstead were a very important family in the district and over the years several members of the family had distinguished connections with the Royal Family. It is possible that these connections brought about the visit of Queen Elizabeth I to Lawshall in 1578.

Queen Elizabeth I visited Henry Drury at Lawshall Hall during her "Royal Progress" tour in August 1578. The Queen was travelling from Long Melford and after dining at Lawshall Hall with some of the Drury family continued to Hawstead where she was entertained by Sir William Drury. One can imagine "the great rejoycing of ye said Parish" as she made her way through the entire length of the village. For the small village of Lawshall, this would have indeed been a day to remember.

In June 1563 there was a controversial double wedding. The first marriage united the Catholic Rookwood and Protestant Drury families and the second marriage was between Elizabeth Drury of Lawshall and Robert Drury of Hawstead. Thirty years later Elizabeth is named on the list of Papist recusants who had refused to attend Church of England services.

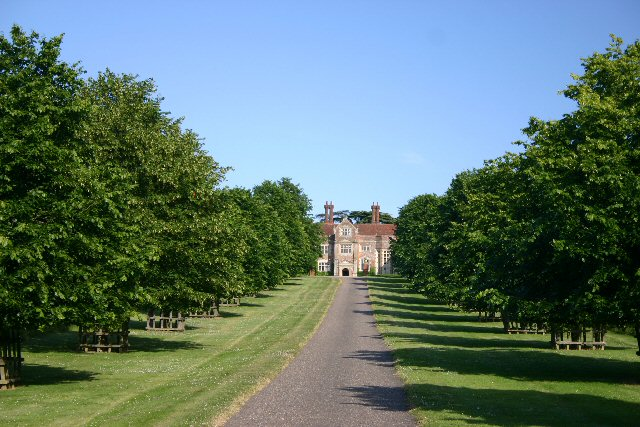
Coldham Hall

Ambrose Rookwood of Coldham Hall was involved in the Catholic conspiracy to blow up King James I and his Parliament. Rookwood had one of the finest studs of horses in the country and was invited to join the Gunpowder Plot conspiracy as his horses might be necessary to facilitate a swift retreat. In November 1605 he was arrested and subsequently imprisoned in the Tower of London before his execution on 31 January 1606.

A map was completed in 1611 for Sir Henry Lee, Lord of the Manor, which provides a detailed picture of the demesne and also the copyhold tenants' land and their houses. Documentary evidence recorded in the seventeenth century included the Hearth Tax records of 1674 which give the name and occupier of every house in the village and the number of hearths that each house contained. Another document of the same period is the Compton Census of 1676 which was a survey of non-conformists.

Lawshall had its own gallows and workhouse. The Abbot of St Edmunds claimed 'right of gallows' in Lawshall. It is possible that, as this right was also claimed by the lords of the neighbouring parishes of Shimpling and Hartest, this duty was shared by one gibbet, situated in the area of Ashen Wood where the three parishes met. The workhouse is recorded as having 20 inmates in 1776.

=== Victorian era ===
The nineteenth century was a period of great change for the village reflecting industrial and agricultural changes across the country. At the same time significant changes occurred in the population of the village (See Population change section). In the 1801 census 554 people were recorded and this total quickly grew to 925 by 1841, but by 1901 this had declined to 664. The state of agriculture during this period is probably the key to the population changes. Increased demands for agricultural produce was caused by the Napoleonic Wars. This in turn improved prices and standards of living and a consequent increase in birth rate. Following the wars, agriculture was depressed until 1834, this period being marked by stagnation in the rate of population growth.

Unemployment at this time meant that people had to fall back on poor relief. By 1834 the cost to the village for paupers was £902 per annum. Part of the cost was borne by the village charities including Corders, Stevens and the Town Land Trust. These charities provided coal and clothing for a number of the adult population. In addition children were also given clothing if they attended Sunday school.

After the depression of the 1820s and early 1830s there followed a period of agricultural prosperity generally known as High Farming. Farmers increased their profits by improving their methods of farming by using artificial fertilisers and adopting more mechanised farming techniques, for example the introduction of threshing machines and advances in land drainage. The beginning of the return to prosperity in Lawshall is shown by the population reaching its highest ever total of 925 in 1841.

With reference to various trade directories for the second half of the nineteenth century, Lawshall appears a mainly self-sufficient community, but one that is starting to send goods and services outside of the village. The major "exporter" at this time was the horsehair factory which was first recorded in 1855. There was also rake and hurdle manufacturers which would have also served surrounding communities. These industries received a boost with the arrival of the railways when the Long Melford-Bury St Edmunds branch line and Cockfield railway station opened on 9 August 1865. The number of carriers increased threefold to accommodate the extra business to and from the station. The line opened for passengers in 1870, enabling some Lawshall residents to visit London for the first time in their lives.

The village had its own mill which was located at Mill Cottage, Golden Lane. In earlier times the 1611 Manorial Map shows that there was a mill site between Lawshall Hall and Harrow Green to the south of the road.

=== Twentieth century ===
The depression lasted until the outbreak of the First World War when both industry and agriculture were stimulated by increased demand. Lawshall, like every other town and village, sent its young men off to war but 24 failed to return. The church clock serves as a visible reminder of them as it was installed as their memorial.

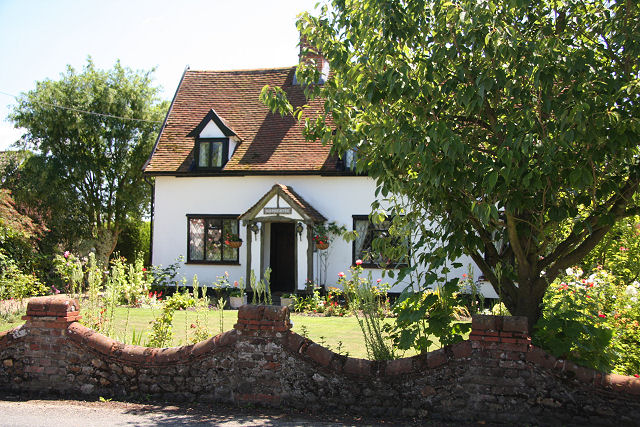
The Old Post Office

There were tremendous changes in the village during the century with the tractor replacing the horse, the car replacing the bicycle and the arrival of the telephone, radio and electricity. The rural landscape of the village changed dramatically. There was a recovery in farming from 1939 to 1945 and as a result of financial incentives to cultivate more land, the clearing of hedgerows and trees began. Then the average field size was about 8 acres (3.2 ha) but today it is nearer 40–50 acres.

Beginning in the 1940s there was a steady decline in the services available in the village. Once there were five public houses in the parish but now only The Swan remains. The Harrow at Harrow Green closed in 1971. The village has also lost village shops, post office, garage and a more regular public transport service. However, some key facilities remain such as All Saints primary school, which was threatened with closure in the late 1980s.

The current village hall was built in the 1960s and remains an important resource for the community. It replaced the old village hall that stood in The Street and was formerly the horsehair factory. The hall also served as the dining hall for the school.

In June 1991, the village sign was unveiled. The design represents Lawshall's links with the Abbey of Ramsey shown by the arms of the abbey flanked by two monks. In 1547, the Manor of Lawshall was sold to the Drury family and the lower shield shows the coat of arms of the Drury family and also the Hanningfield family.

== Places of worship ==
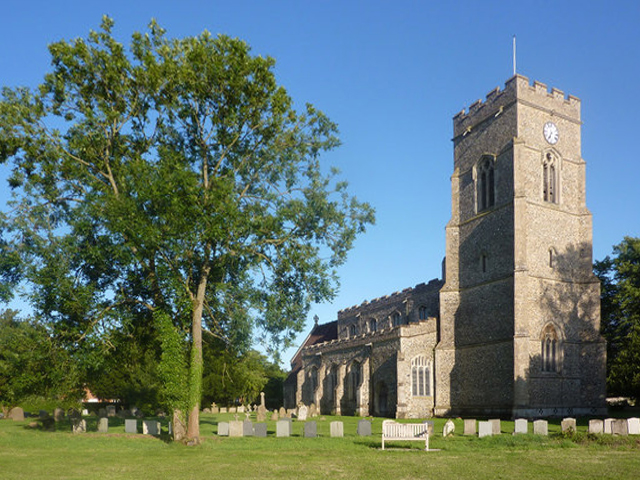
All Saints Church from the northwest of the churchyard

=== All Saints Church ===
This 15th-century flint church is a Grade I listed building with stone dressings comprising a tall west tower, nave, aisles and a nineteenth-century chancel. The first record of the church was in the Domesday Book although it is not necessarily the church that is visible today. The earliest one that can be dated is in the Early English period c. 1166–1266, the chancel and possibly the east windows being of this period. The church was almost completely rebuilt in the mid-15th century on the profits of the cloth industry, and became a vast preaching house after the Reformation.

During the prosperous high farming period of the nineteenth century the most important restoration for over 100 years was undertaken by William Butterfield in the Anglo-catholic style. The rector, Evan Baillie, spent £3,000 of his own money in rebuilding the chancel and putting in new windows before resigned his post and became a teacher at the Church of Our Lady and St Joseph, the Roman Catholic Chapel on Bury Road. His successor was Barrington Mills who proved a strong influence on the village.

=== Church of Our Lady Immaculate and St Joseph ===
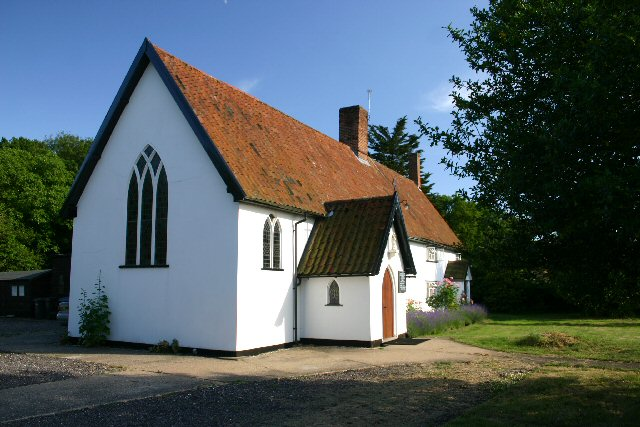
Church of Our Lady Immaculate and St Joseph

The Catholic community of Our Lady Immaculate and St Joseph, otherwise known as Coldham Cottage, dates back to 1574 when services were conducted in what is now Coldham Hall. The present church was built in 1870 and is now the oldest Roman Catholic Mission in Suffolk.

Coldham Cottage itself dates from the late seventeenth/early eighteenth century and has a timber-frame, whitewashed and rendered, with pantile roof and brick central ridge and right end projecting stacks. Until 1868 the priest officiated in the chapel at Coldham Hall but after the sale of the estate in that year a separate church was built utilising one unit of the existing house (kitchen and bedroom with removal of floor) and building on an extension. The whole represents an unusual and rare instance of continuing Catholic use from at least the eighteenth century.

Following renovation work to the cottage, there is now a resident priest as well as facility to provide holiday accommodation for clergy wanting to take time off from their own parishes.

=== Lawshall Evangelical Free Church ===
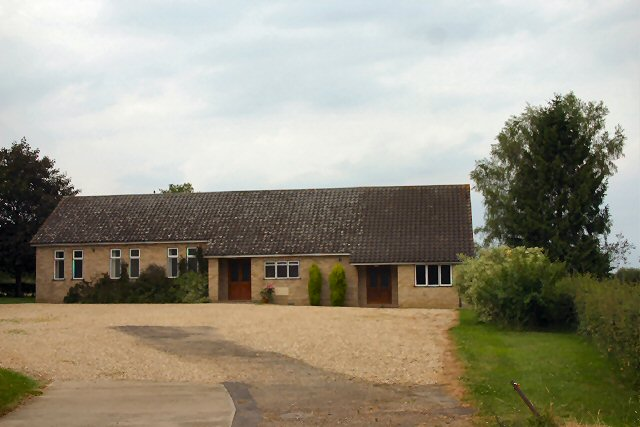
Lawshall Evangelical Free Church.

Lawshall Evangelical Free Church was born out of the desire of local Evangelical Christians in the village of Lawshall and the surrounding villages to undertake their own form of worship. Evangelistic activities by outside bodies (including The Faith Mission) resulted in some conversions and from about 1968 people met in various houses for worship and bible study. Eventually a legacy from the late Walter G Waspe of Lawshall Hall made financial provision for a new church which was opened for worship on 1 August 1970.

The initial accommodation comprised a chapel, vestry, kitchen and toilets. Further additions were made in 1978 with a hall and new toilet facilities. A baptistry was also incorporated in the hall. In July 1976 the church appointed its first Pastor, David Bedford-Groom, who continued to minister and lead the church on a part-time basis for 12 years.

== Governance ==
Lawshall lies in the Babergh district of the shire county of Suffolk. The three tiers of local government are administered by Suffolk County Council, Babergh District Council, and Lawshall Parish Council. Lawshall Parish Council has 7 elected members.

== Facilities ==
=== Public house ===
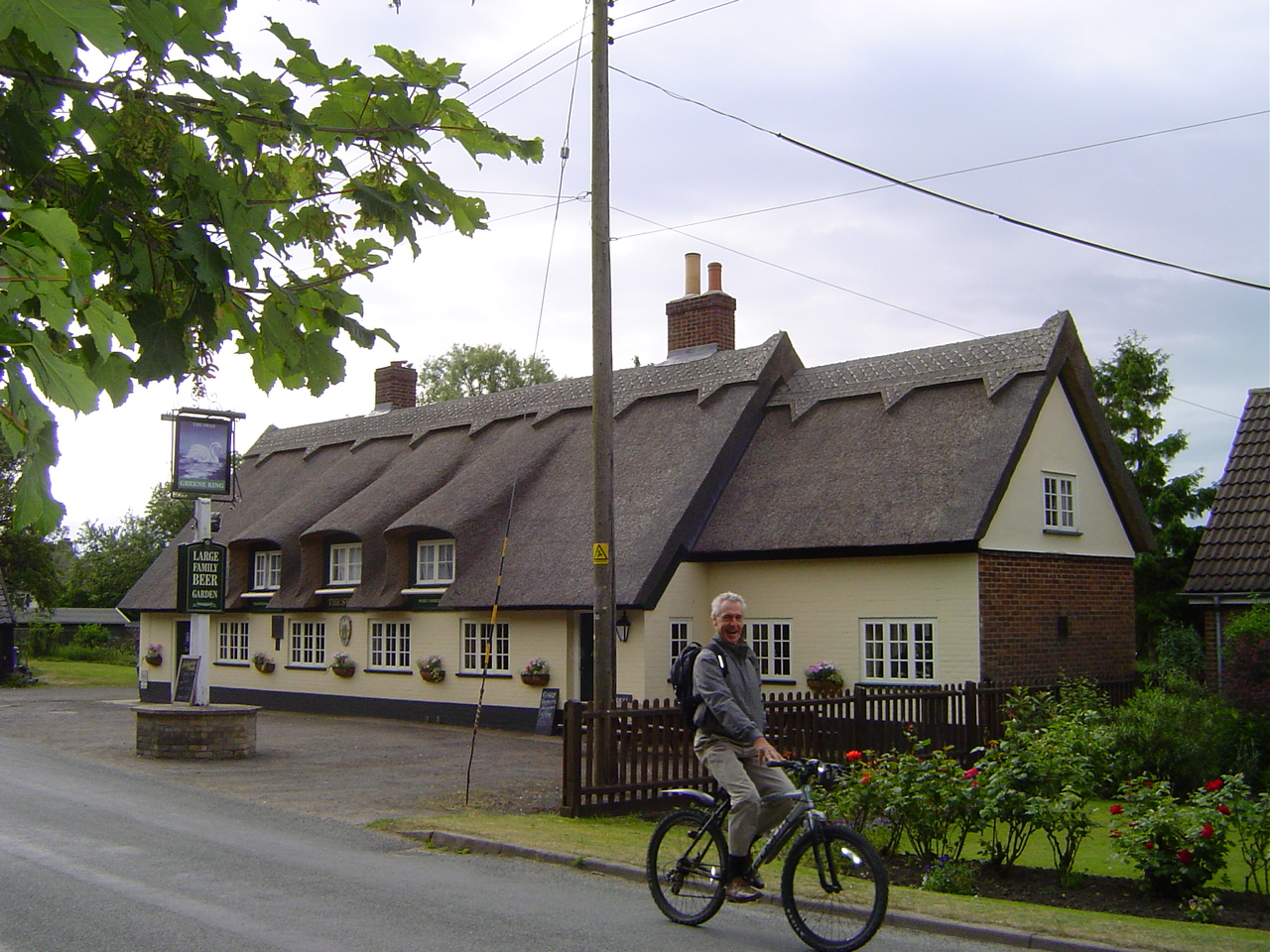
Lawshall Swan Public House

In the nineteenth century there were seven public houses or beer retailers in the parish. The one remaining pub, The Swan Inn, is an eighteenth-century timber-framed and plastered building, previously with an L-shaped plan with a front extension at right angles to the road. This front extension was demolished in 1968 when the building was renovated. The roof is thatched with three dormers. Coins nailed to the underside of the timber beams in the public bar, are from a custom of soldiers during World War I to nail up coins in this way and to reclaim them upon their return. Their current day presence reflects the loss of 24 men from the village.

=== Village hall ===
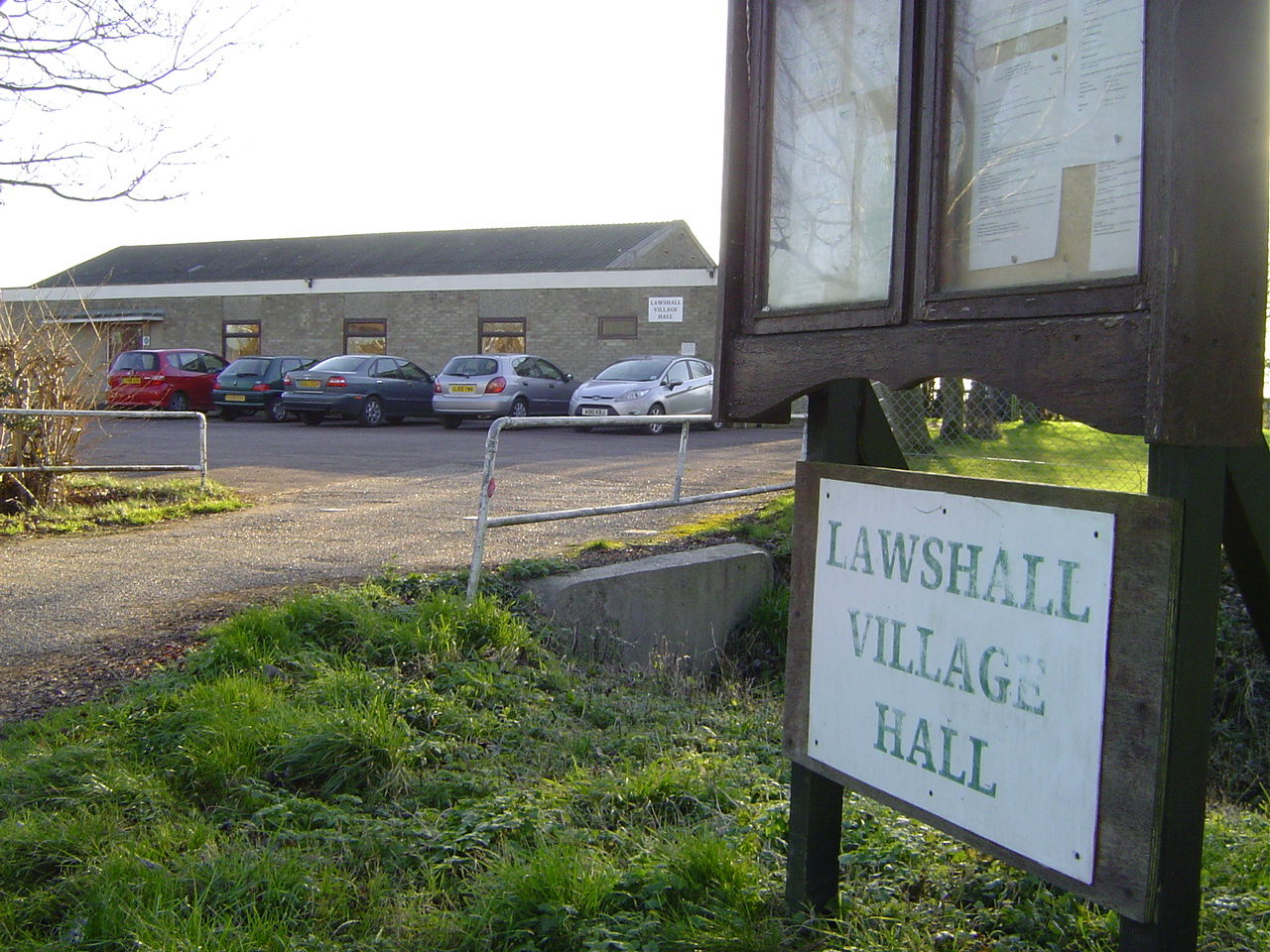
Lawshall Village Hall

Lawshall Village Hall was built in the 1960s replacing the old village hall that stood in the street. It was refurbished in 2007. The Village Hall Management Committee produce a monthly magazine, Round & About Lawshall, which is delivered to every household in the village.

=== Primary school ===
The village contains one school, All Saints CEVCP Primary School. The school is for pupils aged 5–11, and has an average 90 pupils from Lawshall, Alpheton, Shimpling, Bridge Street and Hawstead. Originally built in the Victorian era, the school building was modernised and extended in 1989. The school has a purpose-built nursery building that is shared with Lawshall Pre-School. Older children attend King Edward VI CEVC Upper School in Bury St Edmunds.

=== Recreation ground and open spaces ===
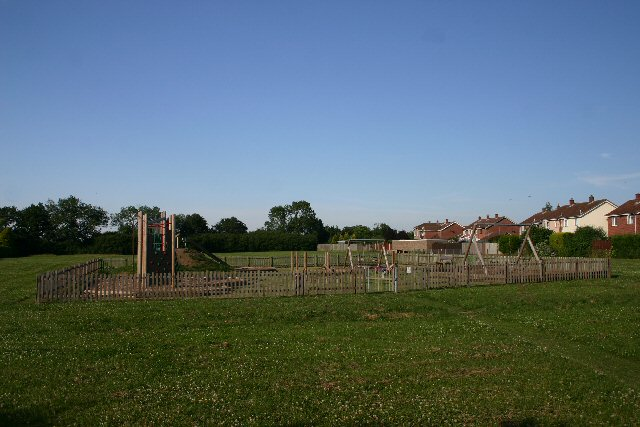
Lawshall Community Playground.

There is a recreation ground on the Shimping Road (near Newhouse Farmhouse) which is used by Hartest and Coldham Hall Cricket Club and Lawshall Swan Football Club. For many years it was also the home ground of Coldham Hall Football Club for whom Brian Talbot played for as a youngster. Previous locations in the parish where sports were played included the field near the entrance to Coldham Hall and the field at the rear of All Saints Church.

Open spaces within the parish include:

- Land between The Glebe and Shepherds Drive - including the play area managed by the Lawshall Community Playground Society.
- Land behind Churchill Close - grassed area used for informal football games.
- Grassland at Hanningfield Green - meadow grassland area that is now designated as a County Wildlife Site.
- Grassland at Lawshall Green - a remaining fragment of flower-rich grassland.

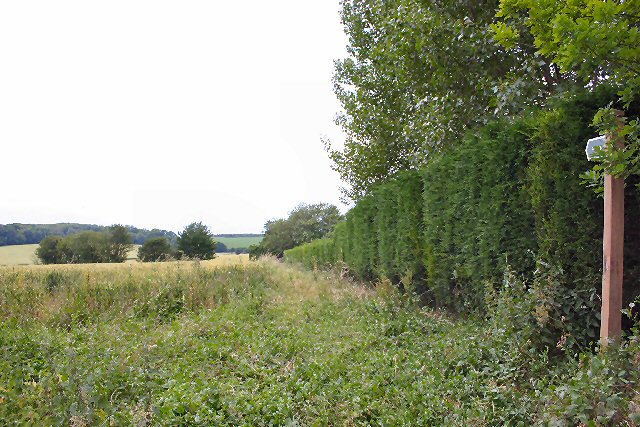
Footpath from Audley End to Hartest

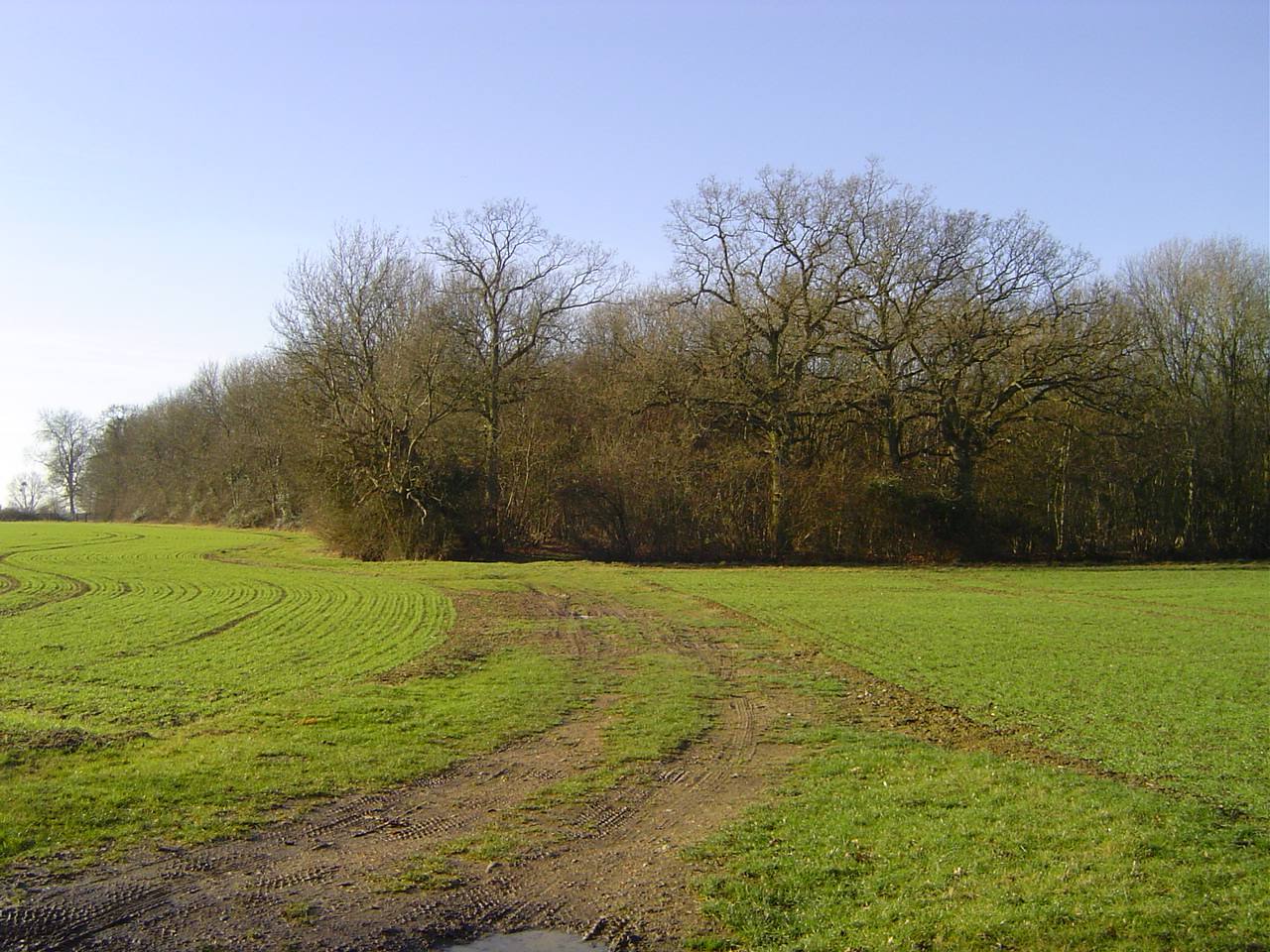
Frithy Wood

=== Bus services ===
Lawshall is served by a bus service operated by Mulleys Motorways which is sponsored by Suffolk County Council.

== Planning ==
In the adopted Babergh Local Plan Alteration No. 2 (2006) the Built-up area boundary is defined for Bury Road, Lambs Lane and The Street with no sites allocated for new residential development. Areas of Visual and/or Recreational Amenity are also defined which protect important open space, visually important gaps in the street scene and recreational facilities.

Part of the parish north of The Street, including Frithy Wood Site of Special Scientific Interest (SSSI), is within an area defined as Special Landscape Area. The boundary of the SSSI is also defined within the parish.

== Listed buildings ==
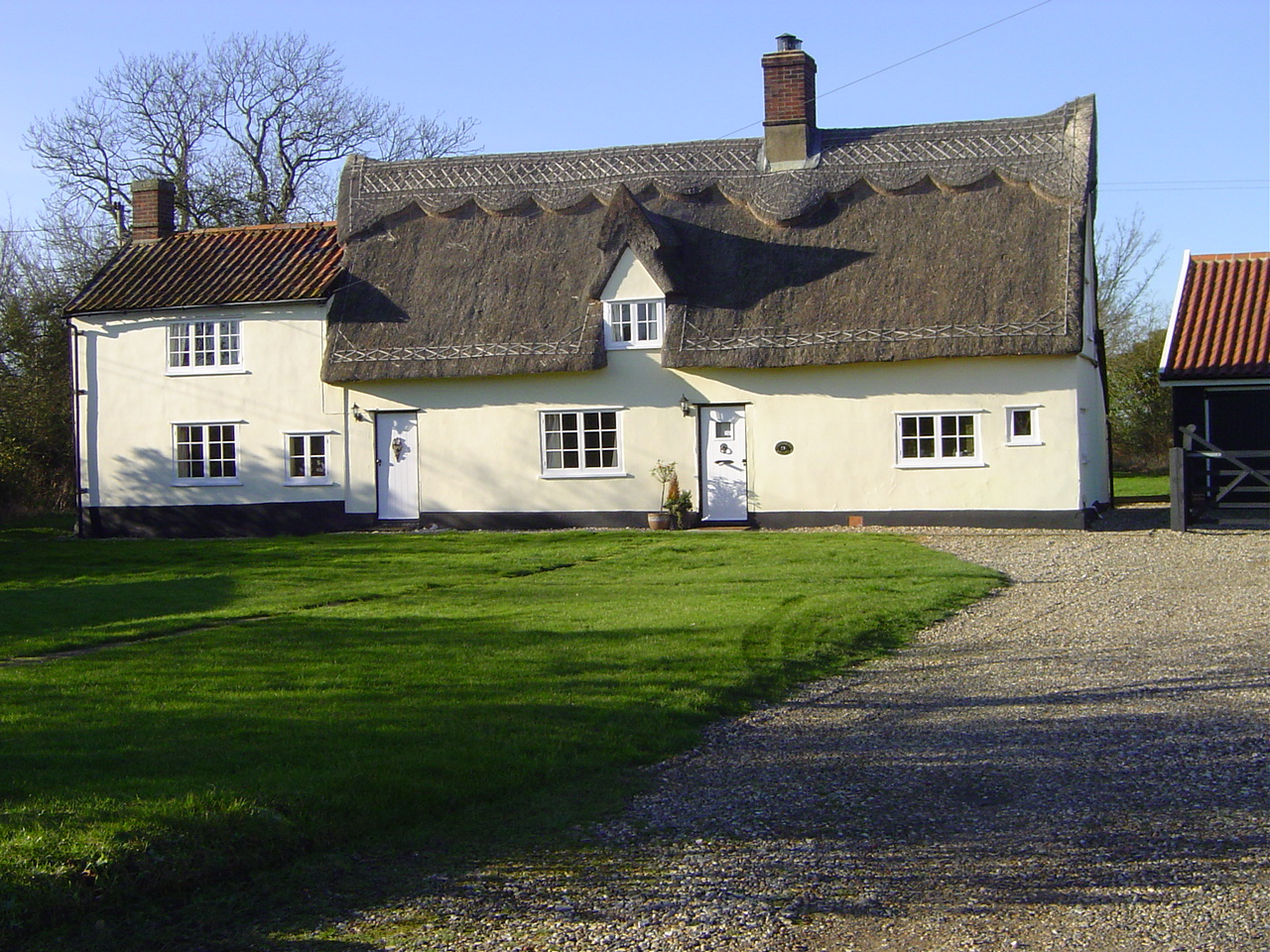
Carpenters Cottage - formerly the Carpenters Arms

Historic England lists the following listed buildings within the parish of Lawshall.

Grade I

- Church of All Saints

Grade II*

- Lawshall Hall

Grade II

- Barfords
- Bowaters and Shepherds Cottage
- Carpenters Cottage
- Church House
- Coldham Cottage and attached Church of Our Lady and St Joseph
- Cottage, Hart's Green
- Dales Farmhouse
- Elm House
- Folly Farm
- Fox Cottage
- Hanningfields Farmhouse
- Hills Farmhouse
- Keepers Cottage
- Little West Farm
- Newhall Cottage
- Newhouse Farmhouse
- Pond Cottage
- Silver Farmhouse
- Street Farmhouse
- Sunnyridge
- Swan Inn
- The Howes
- The Old Post Office
- The Ryes
- The Walnut Trees
- Trees Farmhouse

NB: The above property details usually represent the names and addresses that were used at the time that the buildings were listed. In some instances the name of the building may have changed over the intervening years.

== Biodiversity ==
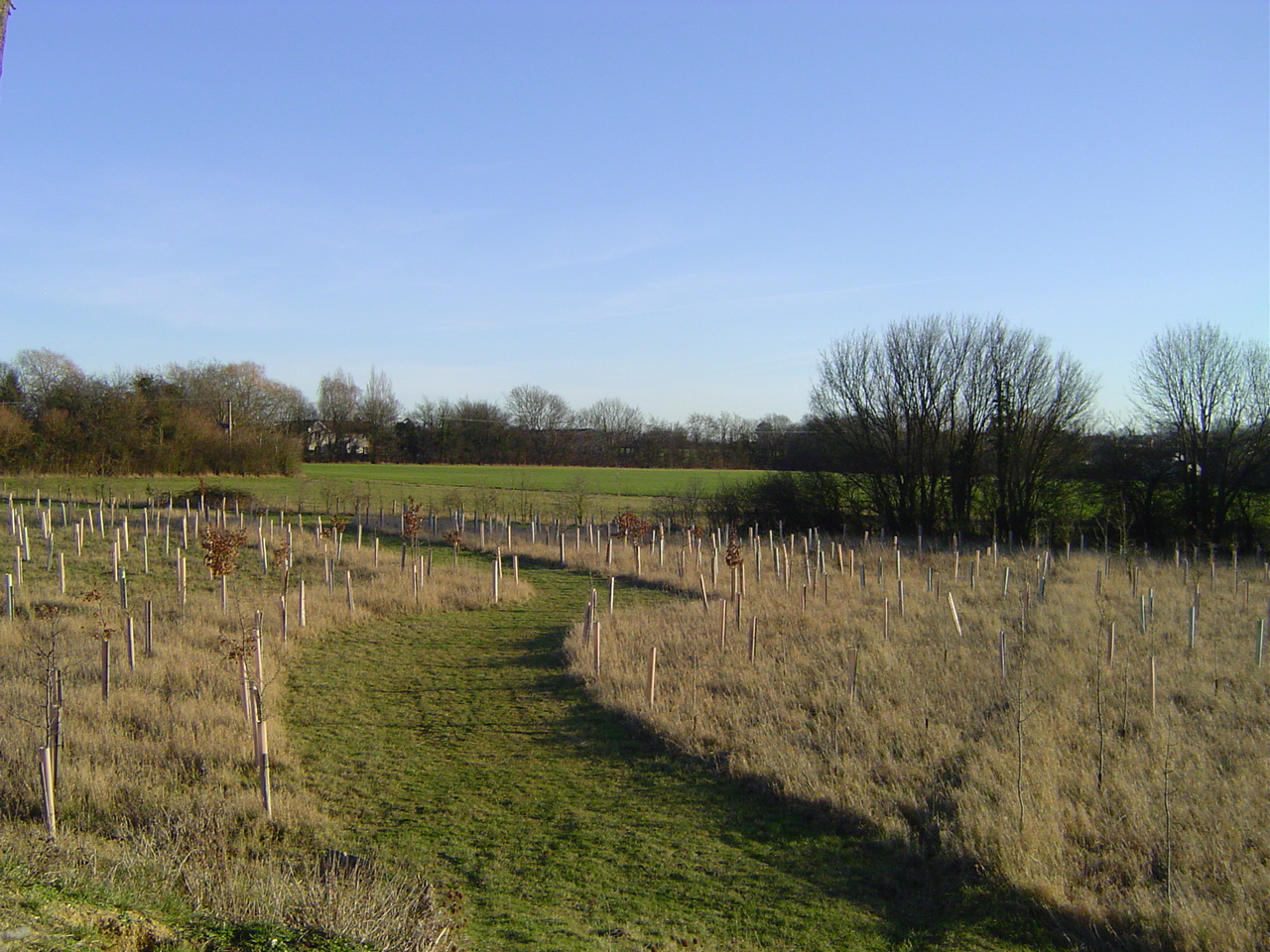
Community woodland planting at Golden Wood.

Within the parish of Lawshall there remain important wildlife sites:

- Woodland - The parish contains part of the Frithy and Chadacre Woods SSSI which are defined as ancient woodlands. Frithy Wood, which at one time extended as far as The Street, is a significant wildlife resource in the parish. There is documentary evidence for the existence of Frithy Wood back in 1545 and its Saxon name would imply that the wood is much older.

Local community woodland in the parish has been planted under the Forest for Our Children environmental project covering 9 hectares of land made up of 2 woods. Crooked Wood was planted in 1993 and Golden Wood between 1994 and 2010. It has been the inspiration behind the Green Light Trust's other community-owned WildSpace sites around the UK and their environmental education programmes for schools.

- Unimproved Grassland - Suffolk now has very little unimproved grassland but both Lawshall and Hanningfield Greens are being managed as hay meadows in the traditional manner. The essential requirements are a hay cut when the flowers have set seed and the removal of the cut material. A second cut is carried out in September. A small area of All Saints churchyard is maintained in a similar manner. Hanningfield Green has been designated a County Wildlife Site in recognition of the range of native flora that grows there.

== Landscape ==
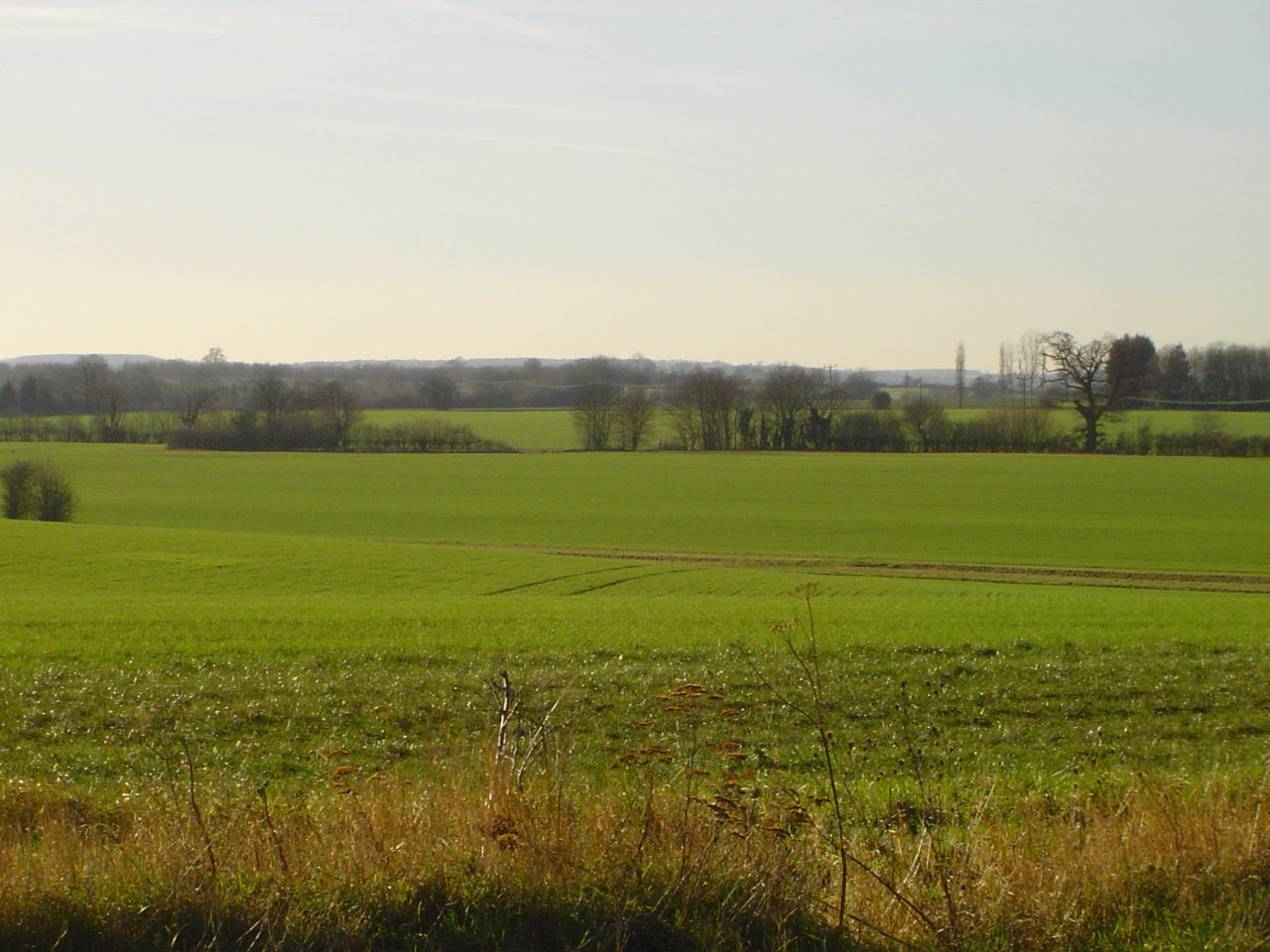
Undulating ancient farmland south of Lawshall Hall.

Within the Suffolk Landscape Character Assessment the parish of Lawshall is within an area defined as

- Undulating ancient farmlands - This is predominantly an area of 'ancient enclosure', with an irregular pattern of fields bounded by large, long-established hedges. The settlement pattern is one of dispersed farmsteads and hamlets, scattered between moderately sized green-edge settlements. The area is well stocked with ancient woods of moderate size, usually situated on the tops of the more poorly drained clay hills. In general there are long open views across this undulating landscape in which trees, either in hedges or in woods, are always a prominent feature. The historic pattern of field boundaries has been degraded through 20th century agricultural rationalisation that has resulted in a large number of hedges being removed.

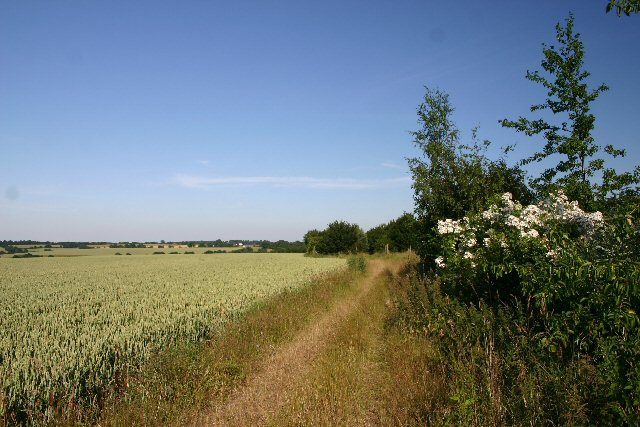
Ancient rolling farmlands north-east of Lawshall Green

- Ancient rolling farmlands - This is a rolling arable landscape of chalky clays and loams. The enclosure over a lot of the landscape retains much of the organic pattern of ancient and species-rich hedgerows and associated ditches. There are however some areas of field amalgamation and boundary loss, especially on the interfluves between the small valleys. The settlement pattern is dispersed farmsteads of mediaeval origin interspersed with some larger hamlets and occasional villages. The farms are large but are mainly owner-occupied rather than estate owned. The hedgerow trees are of typical clayland composition: oak, ash and field maple, with suckering elm. Although there are some areas of extensive field amalgamation, overall the landscape is largely intact, and accessible thorough a dense network of winding roads with wide verges.
- Rolling valley farmlands - This landscape has small and medium-sized fields on the valley sides with an organic form which was created by the piecemeal enclosure of common arable and pasture lands. As with the other valley side landscapes the field size tends to increase on the upper sides and plateaux edges of these valleys. Overall the growth and development of villages and small towns in this landscape has been driven by the quality of the land and the agricultural prosperity that it brought. Ancient woodland is mainly confined to the upper slopes of the valleys and is mostly in relatively small parcels.

The majority of the parish consists of undulating ancient farmlands but in the east of the parish, between Lawshall Green and the A134, the area is defined as ancient rolling farmlands. In addition there is a small area of rolling valley farmlands at Audley End.

== Local organisations ==
Green Light Trust

Green Light Trust is an environmental and educational charity whose mission is to bring communities and landscapes to life through 'hands-on' learning and the growing of woodlands.

Forest For Our Children

Forest For Our Children is the community group that manages Golden Wood and Crooked Wood, Lawshall's community woodlands. They meet on the last Sunday of every month in Golden Wood.

Lawshall Pre-School

Lawshall Pre-School are a self-funding organisation and charity run by a committee of parents of children attending the Pre-School.

The Lawshall Trustees

There are two trusts in the village administered by The Lawshall Trustees. These are:

- Lawshall Relief Fund - provides relief for persons in conditions of need, hardship or distress.
- The Lawshall Trust - makes grants to organisations in the parish to help them with their activities.

Local community groups

- Lawshall Community Playground Society
- Lawshall Garden Club
- Lawshall Toddlers
- Lawshall Women's Institute
- Lawshall Village Hall Management Committee
- Lawshall Archives Group

Sports clubs

Current:

- Hartest and Coldham Hall Cricket Club
- Lawshall & District Carpet Bowls Club
- Lawshall & Cockfield Girls Football Club
- Lawshall Lions Football Club]
- Lawshall Swan Football Club]
- Lawshall Table Tennis Team
- Children's Karate

Former:

- Alpha Sports Football Club (football team of The Harrow Public House)
- Coldham Hall Football Club
- Lawshall and Shimpling Youth Football Club (later known as Lawshall Lions FC and Sicklesmere United FC)

== Demography ==
According to the Office for National Statistics, at the time of the United Kingdom Census 2001, Lawshall had a population of 935.

Population change

Population growth in Lawshall from 1801 to 1891
Year	1801	1811	1821	1831	1841	1851	1881	1891
Population	554	717	837	885	925	908	799	770
Source: A Vision of Britain Through Time

Population growth in Lawshall from 1901 to 2001
Year	1901	1911	1921	1931	1951	1961	2001
Population	664	656	602	598	516	543	935
Source: A Vision of Britain Through Time

== Notable residents ==
Residents of Lawshall have included adventurer John Brereton, witch-hunter John Stearne, failed Gunpowder Plotter Ambrose Rookwood, political adviser David Hart, film producer and director Matthew Vaughn, and model Claudia Schiffer.
