= Coldham Hall =

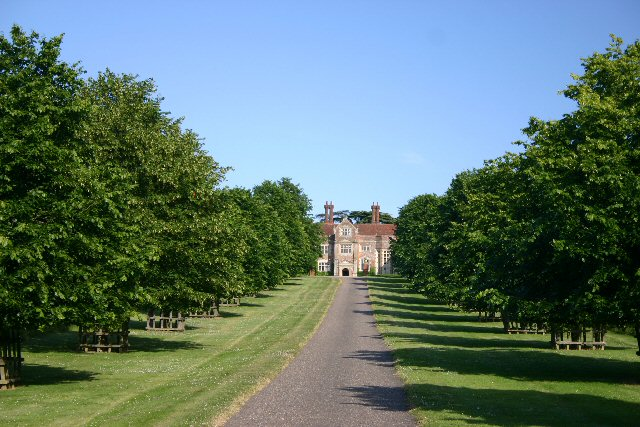
- Coldham Hall

- Location within Suffolk
- 52°10′10″N 0°43′27″E
- Type: Manor House
- Location: Coldham Hall Lane, Stanningfield, Suffolk, England

History
- Built: 1574
- Built for: Robert Rookwood

Site notes
- Area: Suffolk
- Architectural style: Tudor
- Owner: Matthew Vaughn and Claudia Schiffer

Listed Building – Grade I
- Official name: Coldham Hall
- Designated: 14 July 1955
- Reference no.: 1229768

Coldham Hall is a Grade I listed building, built in 1574, in the parish of Bradfield Combust with Stanningfield in Suffolk. The Hall is very close to the village of Lawshall and part of the Coldham estate is located within this parish.

== Description ==
Coldham Hall is a large Tudor country house constructed in 1574 for Sir Robert Rookwood (or Rokewood) of Stanningfield. A notable feature of this two-storey building is the great hall, with a long gallery in the roof space some 32 metres long, running from east to west. Internal alterations undertaken around 1770 include a Roman Catholic chapel with delicate plasterwork leading from the long gallery.

Mid-nineteenth-century alterations, including loggias on the east and south side, are now removed, but various window alterations at the rear and a service wing at the north end remain. The house was restored around 1980.

== History ==
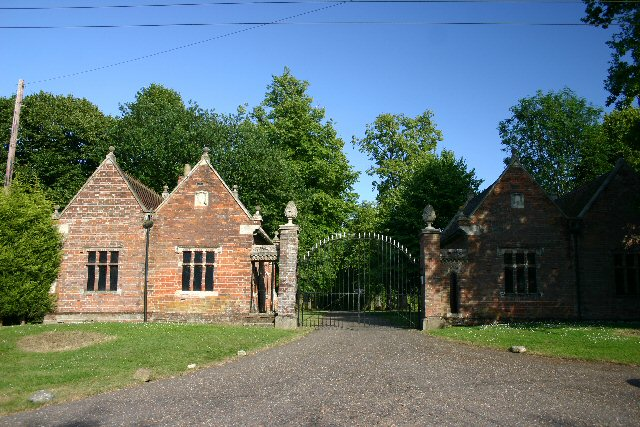
Entrance lodges to Coldham Hall

Following its construction by Robert Rookwood in 1574, Coldham Hall remained the property of the Rookwood family for almost three centuries, until 1869.

The Hall has had a number of famous residents, including Ambrose Rookwood, who was involved in the Gunpowder Plot and was executed in 1605. The Rookwood family continued in the Roman Catholic faith, as shown by the two chapels and several priest holes at Coldham. A remarkable feature of the history of Stanningfield and Lawshall has been the continuity of Roman Catholicism from the Middle Ages to the present day in a predominantly Protestant area.

Whilst the property remained in the Rookwood family until 1869, the estate passed through the female line to the Gages of Hengrave and was let to a tenant, Robert Taylor, in the 1840s. In 1869 the estate was sold to Richard Holt-Lomax, whose family held it until 1893.

The purchaser in 1893 was Lieutenant Colonel Henry Trafford-Rawson, who developed Coldham as a shooting estate, enlarging old clumps of woodland and planting new blocks, some very close to the Hall. In 1918, after the death of the Colonel's son, Captain John Henry Edmund Trafford-Rawson (of the West Yorkshire Regiment like his father), at the Somme during the Great War, the Coldham estate was purchased by Colonel Everard Hambro, who lived there until his death in 1952.

In 1952 the estate was purchased by Richard Duce, who owned the property for 27 years before selling it to David Hart, an adviser to Margaret Thatcher, in 1979.

Since then the estate has been owned by Jens Pilo and more recently by Matthew Vaughn and his supermodel wife, Claudia Schiffer, the current owners. A fire on the property in 2014 destroyed several buildings in the grounds but did not reach the hall itself.

== Gardens and grounds ==
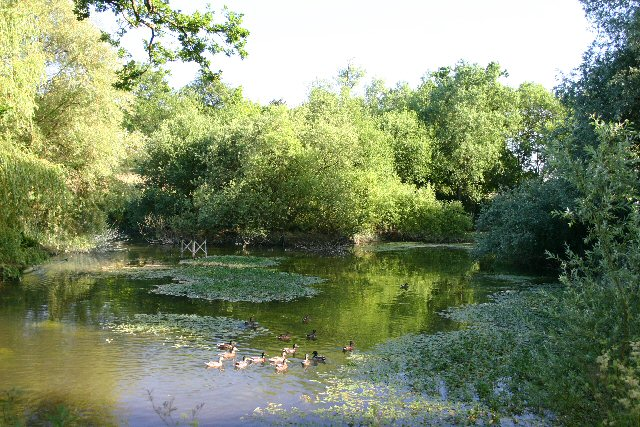
Duckpond at Coldham Hall

The house is approached down an avenue of trees and by crossing two small lakes in the valley bottom, which drain to the River Lark. There is a footpath alongside the grounds of the Hall, allowing a view of the mansion.

== Community ==
In the past Coldham Hall had strong links with the local communities of Lawshall and Stanningfield, with many local women working in service at the main house and local men employed on the estate as agricultural workers or grooms. In the 1920s Christmas parties for the children of the employees at Coldham Hall were held in the Emancipation Chapel at Stanningfield.

The field near the main entrance onto the Bury Road, Lawshall, was used for both football and cricket for many years. The clubs relocated more than 40 years ago but the Coldham Hall Football Club still plays in the Bury & District Sunday Football League and the Hartest & Coldham Hall Cricket Club in the Hunts County Bats Suffolk Cricket League.

David Hart maintained a rapport with the local community by inviting local residents to Coldham Hall on 5 November, Guy Fawkes Night, to acknowledge the estate's link with the Gunpowder Plot, with a fireworks display and synchronised music from a brass band.

== Folklore ==
A tunnel is said to have run from Coldham Hall to the 16th-century Lawshall Hall in Lawshall, a mile to the south.

== Notable former and current residents ==
The following lived at Coldham Hall:

- Ambrose Rookwood - a member of the failed 1605 Gunpowder Plot, a conspiracy to replace the Protestant King James I with a Catholic monarch.
- David Hart - an adviser to Margaret Thatcher, a British writer and businessman, who lived at Coldham Hall and Chadacre Hall.

The hall was bought by the model Claudia Schiffer and her husband, the film director Matthew Vaughn, in 2002.
