= Bury Road, Lawshall =

Coordinates: 52.15°N 00.73°E

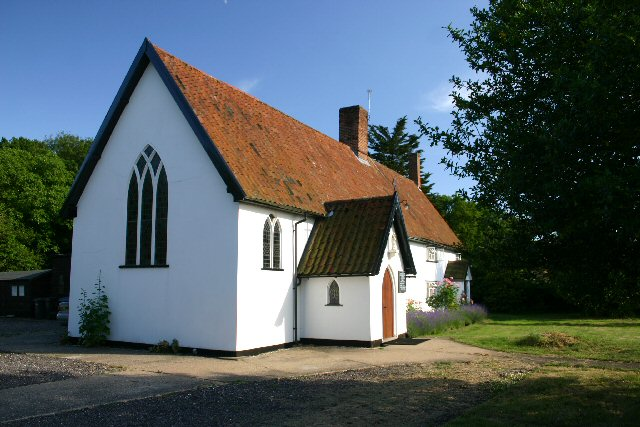
- Church of Our Lady Immaculate and St Joseph – known as Coldham Cottage

- Location within Suffolk
- District: Babergh
- Shire county: Suffolk
- Region: East
- Country: England
- Sovereign state: United Kingdom
- Post town: Bury St Edmunds
- Postcode district: IP29

Bury Road, Lawshall is a linear settlement in the civil parish of Lawshall in the Babergh district in the county of Suffolk, England. The northern part of the settlement is in the civil parish of Bradfield Combust with Stanningfield in West Suffolk. Bury Road is located between Hawstead and Lambs Lane / The Glebe and is two miles off the A134 between Bury St Edmunds and Sudbury.

== Previous names ==
Bury Road was known as Chelisford Street in the 1567 Lawshall Survey. On the west side of Bury Road from the phone box to Rowney Farm there was a track known as Shepherdes Lane, the entrance to which was known as Shepherdes Gate. On the east side of Bury Road from Hill's Farm to The Street there was a track known as The Parson's Way.

== History ==
=== Catholic Mission at Coldham Cottage ===
The Church of Our Lady Immaculate and St Joseph, otherwise known as Coldham Cottage, is located in Bury Road near the entrance to Coldham Hall. From the time of the Reformation the history of the Catholic Mission had been closely linked to the Rookwood family and Coldham Hall. The hall itself is in the neighbouring parish of Stanningfield but the main entrance gatehouse, the avenue and the present church are in Lawshall.

The Rookwoods who had been in the area since 1315, built a magnificent house in 1574 and pulled down their former residence. The new house was constructed with its "built-in" secret attic chapel, its hiding hole and escape down a chimney with an outer wall.

Four years after the completion of the hall Queen Elizabeth I paid her visit to Lawshall. Efforts were made by the Rookwoods to persuade her to visit them at the hall but these were rewarded by one of the family being thrown in prison in Bury St Edmunds where he later died. The disturbances between the Roman Catholics and Protestants probably touched the village in many ways. The tale of fines and confiscations can be followed in the Rookwood records. During these difficult times the priests sometimes stayed at Coldham Hall but their names were not recorded for security.

Sometimes during the late sixteenth century or early seventeenth century the attic chapel was no longer used for religious purposes. Another place was used for Mass, buried in the woods and surrounded by a moat. This second chapel was at a house named Barfords and the building, with the remains of the chapel still survives. At about this time the Rookwoods were linked with the Gage family at Hengrave Hall when Sir Thomas Gage took over Coldham Hall from his mother who was a Rookwood. His brother Fr. John Gage nearly brought the Coldham mission to an end by arranging for a good many people to travel to his new church in Bury St Edmunds. In an attempt to stop the drop in communicants at the beginning of the nineteenth century a third chapel was built at Coldham Hall. It is still there but no longer used for services.

In 1865 when Fr. Patrick Rogers was priest new challenges arose when Coldham Hall was sold because of financial difficulties. Mass was said at Barfords once again until 1870 when the presbytery at Coldham Cottage was adapted and extended to form the present church. At about this time the Catholic school was moved to a site adjacent to the new church.

Coldham Cottage itself dates from the late seventeenth/early eighteenth century and has a timber-frame, whitewashed and rendered, with pantile roof and brick central ridge and right end projecting stacks. A separate church was created utilising one unit of the existing house (kitchen and bedroom with removal of floor) and building on an extension. The whole represents an unusual and rare instance of continuing Catholic use from at least the eighteenth century.

Following renovation work to the cottage, there is now a resident priest as well as facility to provide holiday accommodation for clergy wanting to take time off from their own parishes. The present church is now the oldest Roman Catholic Mission in Suffolk.

=== Coldham Cottage Roman Catholic School ===
Over a period of 127 years children from Roman Catholic families in Lawshall and Stanningfield were able to attend a Roman Catholic School. A school was first established in 1816 on the Coldham Hall estate, as a Catholic girls' boarding school. It moved in 1823 to Barfields, a farm building on the estate which had been adapted for use as a chapel along with a school under the care of Miss Mayston. She lived in the house next to the chapel and had the school in her best room.

After the estate was sold in 1867, the school moved a year later to land adjacent to the new church at Bury Road. The land was bought for this purpose at the estate sale. The building included an upper room with a stage for theatricals. An annexe was built in 1870 and a new larger classroom added in 1933. The school remained at Bury Road until it closed in 1950.

=== Flight Sergeant Johannes Bartholomeus Jat Van Mesdag ===
A memorial stone is located on Bury Road to Flight Sergeant Johannes Bartholomeus Jat Van Mesdag, aged 21, who lost his life during the night of 6 March 1945 while flying his Mustang MK.III. It was his mother's birthday. The memorial was dedicated by All Saints Church, Lawshall on 8 November 2009 and is located near the spot where the plane came down. Prior to war breaking out Johannes was studying in the United States. During that period he lived in Ardsley, New York. He then joined the Dutch forces in Canada before being sent to the UK, arriving on 17 August 1942 and gaining his wings on 26 November 1943. He flew with No. 64 Squadron who were based at RAF Bentwaters, Suffolk.

== Green Light Trust ==
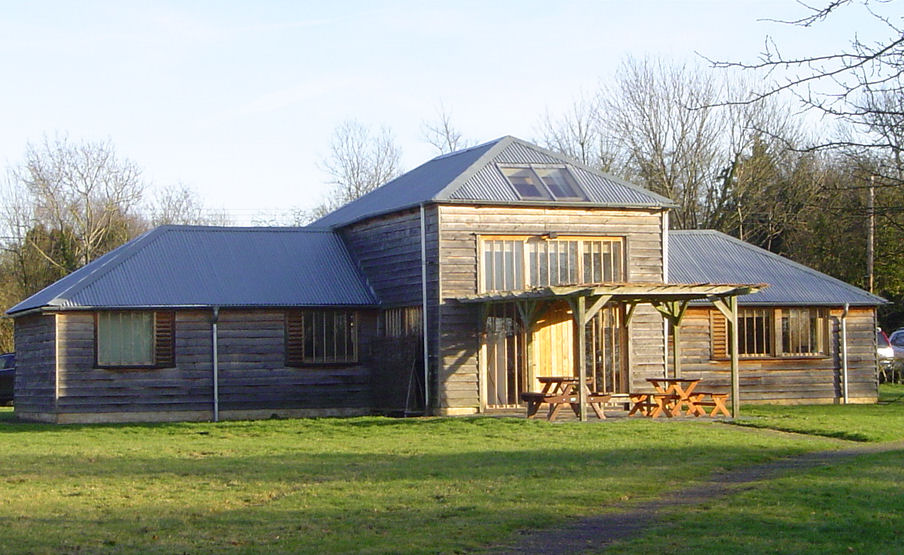
The Foundry – The Green Light Trust's headquarters in Bury Road.

The Green Light Trust is an environmental and educational charity whose mission is to bring communities and landscapes to life through 'hands-on' learning and the growing of woodlands. The Trust is based at The Foundry in Bury Road.

Forest for Our Children was the Trust's first Community-owned WildSpace project at Crooked Wood and Golden Wood, Lawshall. It has been the inspiration behind their many other WildSpace sites around the UK and their environmental education programmes for schools. The project includes Golden Wood, just off Bury Road, where new planting has taken place between 1994 and 2010.

The Foundry is the Green Light Trust's headquarters and training centre which is set in 2.5 acres of meadowland at Bury Road. In 2006, The Foundry was awarded a prestigious RIBA Sustainability Award. Built using "deep green" construction methods, it is a carbon neutral building that is as autonomous as possible.

The Foundry was originally an 1840s threshing barn that was transformed into a traction engine maintenance shed in the 1880s. It later became a forge and foundry between 1920 and 1950. Abandoned for 50 years, Green Light Trust decided to breathe new life into it and to make The Foundry their headquarters as well as a shining example of sustainable building in East Anglia. The project started on 27 May 2005 and a year later the self-sufficient and carbon-neutral building was completed. The building is available for hire.

== Listed buildings ==
English Heritage lists the following five Grade II Listed buildings within the settlement of Bury Road, Lawshall:

- Coldham Cottage and attached Church of Our Lady and St Joseph – Images of England
- Elm House – Images of England
- Hills Farmhouse – Images of England
- Keepers Cottage – Images of England
- Newhall Cottage – Images of England (Bradfield Combust with Stanningfield)

NB: The above property details usually represent the names and addresses that were used at the time that the buildings were listed. In some instances the name of the building may have changed over the intervening years.

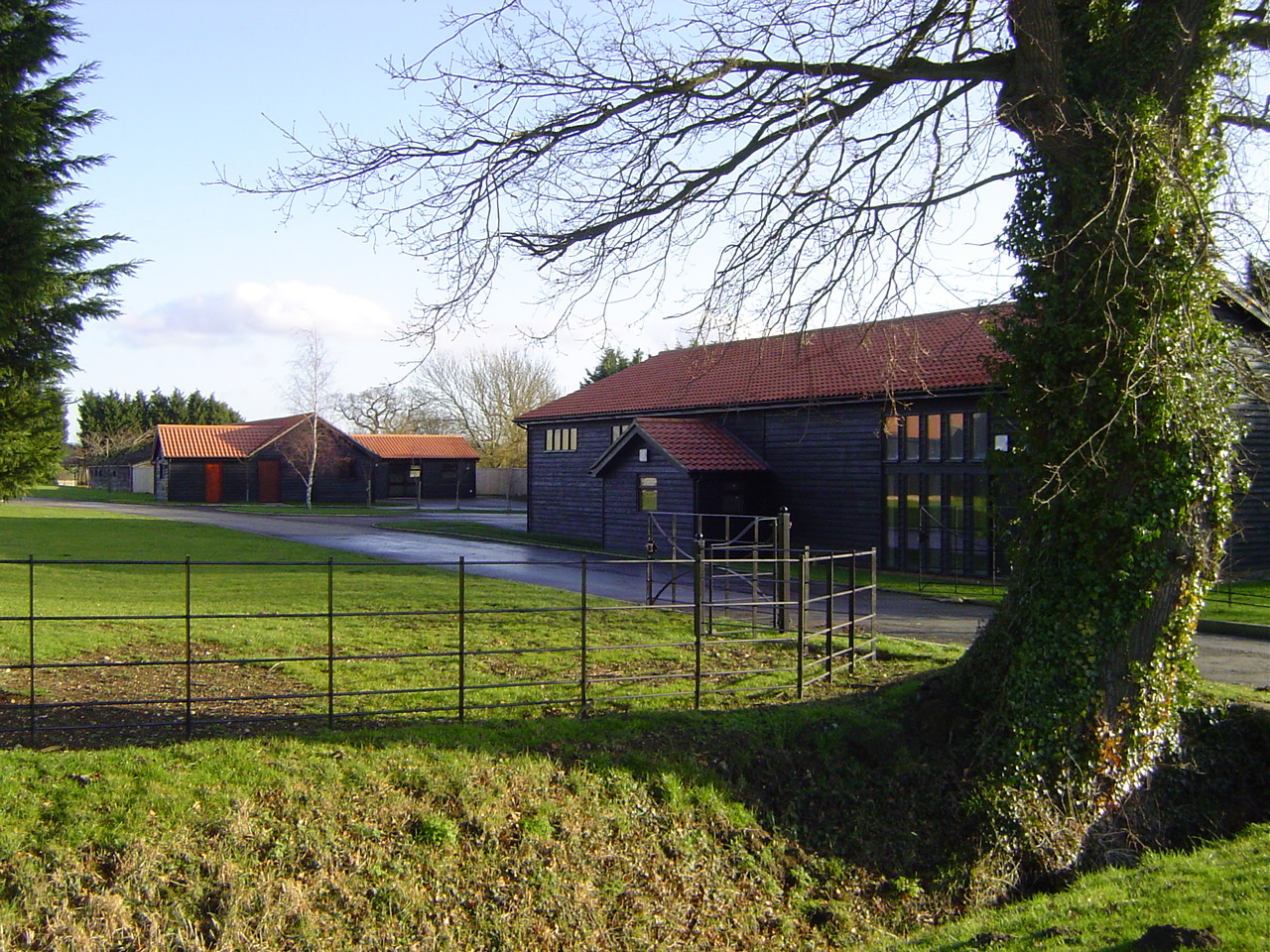
Business units at Newhall Farm

== Newhall Farm business units ==
A diversification scheme has recently been undertaken at Newhall Farm, within the parish of Bradfield Combust with Stanningfield, which provides four detached barn style business units fronting Bury Road. The four buildings are between 500 and 2,400 square feet in size and are suitable for offices, workshops, storage space and a showroom. It represents a small business park for Lawshall but the units are currently unoccupied.
