= Lawshall Green =

Hamlet in Suffolk, England

Coordinates: 52.1491°N 00.7464°E

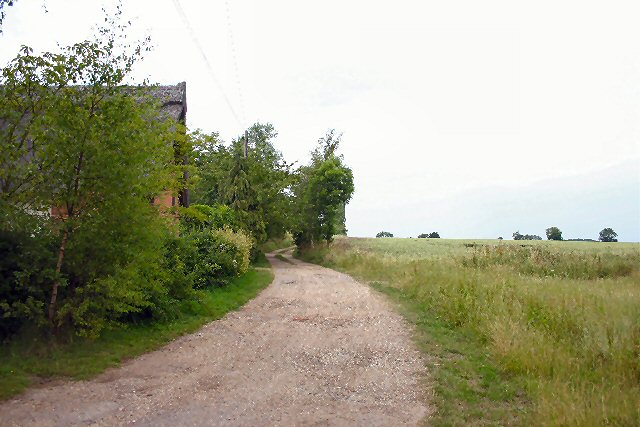
- Lawshall Green – track to Trees Farm

- Location within Suffolk
- District: Babergh
- Shire county: Suffolk
- Region: East
- Country: England
- Sovereign state: United Kingdom
- Post town: Bury St Edmunds
- Postcode district: IP29

Lawshall Green is a hamlet in the civil parish of Lawshall in the Babergh district in the county of Suffolk, England. It is located east of Hibb's Green and is less than half a mile off the A134 between Bury St Edmunds and Sudbury.

== Previous names ==
Lawshall Green was known as Halk Street Green in the 1567 Lawshall Survey. The road from the Green to the A134 was known as Madges Lane and was also known as The Drove Lane. There was also a lost lane (still marked by the hedge) known as The W(i)elde Lane that ran north-east from the Green.

== Listed buildings ==
English Heritage lists two Grade II Listed buildings within the hamlet of Lawshall Green:

- Pond Cottage – An eighteenth/nineteenth century lump building that has been plastered. The roof is thatched with two dormers on the front and a central square chimney stack. The gable is weather-boarded. It was formerly two cottages. Images of England
- The Howes – An eighteenth-century timber-framed house extended and turned into two cottages in the nineteenth century, with sympathetic twentieth century extensions at the east end. The roof is thatched and now has three sloping roofed dormers and a central chimney stack. Images of England
- Trees Farmhouse – An early-mid sixteenth timber-framed and plastered house, with later additions to the north elevations, forming an L-shaped plan. The house was re-roofed, probably in the eighteenth century at a lower pitch and pantiled, with 2 gabled dormers on the front. There is a central square chimney stack. The interior has exposed timber-framing, ceiling beams and joists. Trees Farmhouse was purchased and restored by Derek Moore of Walsham le Willows in 1972, the farmhouse is located immediately north of Lawshall Green. Images of England

NB: The above property details usually represent the names and addresses that were used at the time that the buildings were listed. In some instances the name of the building may have changed over the intervening years.

== Drake's Well ==
The Drake family lived at Thorne Court, Shimpling and they worshipped at All Saints Church, Lawshall. The family would drive along the private road from Thorne Court to Lawshall Green. Charles Frederick Tyrwitt Drake died on 23 June 1878 and was buried in Jerusalem. In his memory the family commissioned the digging of Drake's Well and the provision of a handsome cover to be placed over the well. It remains an impressive feature as one enters Lawshall from the A134.

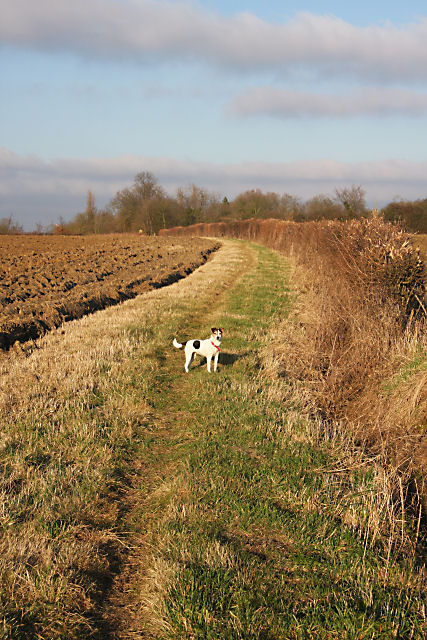
Footpath to Lawshall Green – part of St Edmund Way

== St Edmund Way ==
The St Edmund Way is a long distance footpath that extends from Sudbury to Bury St Edmunds and connects the Stour Valley Path with the Lark Valley Path. The St Edmund Way passes through Long Melford and Lavenham before reaching Lawshall Green where it progresses northward to Stanningfield and Little Whelnetham and then onwards to Bury St Edmunds. The total length of the route is 13 miles and Lawshall Green represents the half-way point.
