= Lawshall Hall =

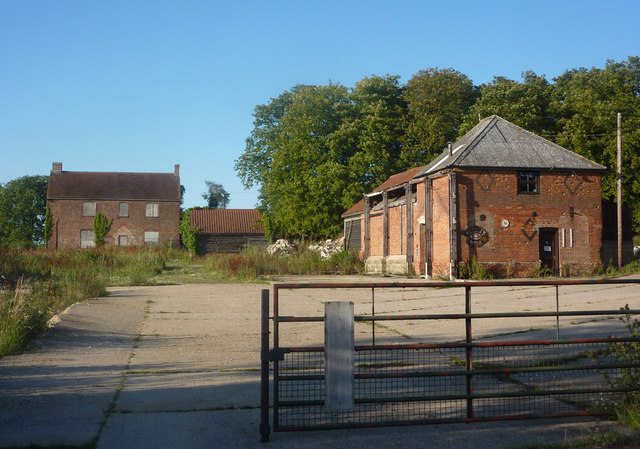
- Lawshall Hall

- Location in Suffolk
- 52.154812°N 0.722342°E
- Location: The Street, Lawshall, Suffolk, England

History
- Built: Mid sixteenth century

Listed Building – Grade II*
- Official name: Lawshall Hall
- Designated: 10 January 1953

Lawshall Hall is a Grade II* listed building, re-built in 1557, that is located in the parish of Lawshall in Suffolk. The Hall is adjacent to All Saints Church and is very close to the centre of the village.

== History ==
The original manor house on the site of Lawshall Hall dates from at least the eleventh century when it belonged to Ramsey Abbey at Ramsey. An agreement was drawn up between the Abbot of Ramsey and William Herberd in 1269 that required Herberd to provide for the widow of Alexander Hemning, the tenant of Lawshall Hall, and her two sons. Herberd was to "maintain the sons and land in as good or better state than when he first had access to the wife of Alexander".

After the Dissolution of the Monasteries in 1534 the Manor of Lawshall, including Lawshall Hall, was granted to John Rither for 13 years and then in 1547 was sold to Sir William Drury. The Drurys of Hawstead were a very important family in the district and over the years several members of the family had distinguished connections with the Royal Family. It is possible that these connections brought about the visit of Queen Elizabeth I to Lawshall in 1578.

Queen Elizabeth I visited Henry Drury at Lawshall Hall during her "Royal Progress" tour in August 1578. The Lawshall parish register records that:

"It is to be remembred that the queens highnesse, in her progresse, ....dined at Lawshall Hall, to the great rejoycing of ye said Parish, and the Country thereabouts."

The queen was met with an impressive welcoming committee led by the High Sheriff of Suffolk, Sir William Spring:

"There were two hundred young gentlemen, clad all in white velvet, and three hundred of the graver sorte, apparelled in black velvet coates, and fair chaynes, all ready at one instant and place, with fifteen hundred serving men more, on horseback, well and bravely mounted, in good order, ready to receive the queens highness into Suffolk, which was surely a comely troop, and a noble sight to behold."

For the small village of Lawshall, this would have indeed been a day to remember. The preparations at Lawshall were made by Richard Conysbie, 'Extraordinary' Gentleman Usher who was not on the regular staff. He must have been in attendance on other duties and assembled a nine-man team to provide some temporary help for the two regular ushers.

Henry Drury entertained and fed her entourage at lunch, after which the queen asked that he pledge his loyalty to the throne, denounce his faith, and acknowledge the crown as the spiritual head of the church. Henry Drury would have certainly pledged his life to defend the queen, but would not renounce his church, and was arrested on the spot. When Elizabeth called next on his nephew Sir William Drury that evening at Hawstead Place, Hawstead, Sir William converted and thus secured his politically correct position with the crown. In contrast, Henry was imprisoned for six months, and was in prison off and on for the next three years.

The hall was much larger than it is today with the Hearth Tax Return of 1674 listing the property as having 14 hearths.

== Architecture ==
Lawshall Hall is a mid-sixteenth-century red brick house with some blue brick diapering, built on a T-shaped plan, with the older wing extending north-west. The house may have been part of an old monastery and has massive brick walls approximately six feet thick in places. Part of the original wall is apparent at the north-west end of the front wing, with two small, stone-framed windows and a Tudor arched doorway. The house has been greatly altered and was refronted on the south-west elevation in the nineteenth century with three-window range of double-hung sashes. The north-east wing has some original mullioned and transomed windows but has been partly blocked. The roof was tiled in the twentieth century. The house is dated 1557 with the arms of the Drurys.

== Recent history and present day ==
Lawshall Hall has stood empty since the 1950s and has been defined as ‘at risk’ by English Heritage on their Heritage at Risk Register. For many years the hall was part of a working farmyard but most of the farm buildings have now been removed. In 2005 the roof of the hall was re-roofed and chimneys re-pointed.

Lawshall Hall, standing in 53 acres of grounds, woodland and farmland, is currently the subject of a major restoration scheme which will restore the building to residential use and safeguard the heritage of this important building.

== Folklore ==
A tunnel is said to have run from Lawshall Hall to the 16th century Coldham Hall in Stanningfield, a mile to the north. This mansion was built in 1574 by Robert Rookwood, whose son Ambrose Rookwood was a co-conspirator with Guy Fawkes.

== Acknowledgements ==
An acknowledgement is made to the work of Elizabeth Clarke, the Local History Recorder for Lawshall, whose endeavours obtaining and collating information from various sources has made this article possible.
