= List of United Kingdom locations: Han-Har =

The United Kingdom

This is part of the list of United Kingdom locations: a gazetteer of place names in the United Kingdom showing each place's locality and geographical coordinates.

== Han-Hap ==
Location	Locality	Coordinates (links to map & photo sources)	OS grid reference
Hanbury	Worcestershire	52.26°N 02.06°W	SO9663
Hanbury	Staffordshire	52.84°N 01.74°W	SK1727
Hanbury Woodend	Staffordshire	52.83°N 01.76°W	SK1626
Hanby	Lincolnshire	52.86°N 00.48°W	TF0231
Hanchett End	Suffolk	52.08°N 00.40°E	TL6546
Hanchurch	Staffordshire	52.96°N 02.23°W	SJ8441
Handa Island	Highland	58.38°N 05.19°W	NC135480
Hand and Pen	Devon	50.74°N 03.36°W	SY0495
Handbridge	Cheshire	53.17°N 02.88°W	SJ4165
Handcross	West Sussex	51.04°N 00.20°W	TQ2629
Handforth	Cheshire	53.34°N 02.22°W	SJ8583
Hand Green	Cheshire	53.13°N 02.68°W	SJ5460
Handless	Shropshire	52.50°N 02.90°W	SO3990
Handley	Cheshire	53.10°N 02.80°W	SJ4657
Handley	Derbyshire	53.14°N 01.44°W	SK3761
Handley Green	Essex	51.68°N 00.38°E	TL6501
Handsacre	Staffordshire	52.74°N 01.86°W	SK0916
Handside	Hertfordshire	51.79°N 00.21°W	TL2312
Handsworth	Birmingham	52.50°N 01.95°W	SP0390
Handsworth	Sheffield	53.36°N 01.40°W	SK4086
Handsworth Wood	Birmingham	52.50°N 01.92°W	SP0590
Handy Cross	Somerset	51.07°N 03.25°W	ST1231
Handy Cross	Buckinghamshire	51.60°N 00.77°W	SU8590
Hanford	Dorset	50.89°N 02.22°W	ST8411
Hanford	City of Stoke-on-Trent	52.97°N 02.19°W	SJ8742
Hangersley	Hampshire	50.85°N 01.75°W	SU1706
Hanging Bank	Kent	51.23°N 00.11°E	TQ4851
Hanging Heaton	Kirklees	53.70°N 01.62°W	SE2523
Hanging Houghton	Northamptonshire	52.35°N 00.90°W	SP7573
Hanging Langford	Wiltshire	51.13°N 01.95°W	SU0337
Hangingshaw	Scottish Borders	55.56°N 02.96°W	NT3930
Hangingshaw	Dumfries and Galloway	55.18°N 03.41°W	NY1089
Hangleton	Brighton and Hove	50.83°N 00.21°W	TQ2606
Hangleton	West Sussex	50.81°N 00.46°W	TQ0803
Hangsman Hill	Doncaster	53.61°N 00.98°W	SE6714
Hanham	South Gloucestershire	51.44°N 02.51°W	ST6472
Hanham Green	Bath and North East Somerset	51.42°N 02.51°W	ST6470
Hankelow	Cheshire	53.00°N 02.49°W	SJ6745
Hankerton	Wiltshire	51.60°N 02.04°W	ST9790
Hankham	East Sussex	50.82°N 00.28°E	TQ6105
Hanley	City of Stoke-on-Trent	53.02°N 02.18°W	SJ8847
Hanley Castle	Worcestershire	52.06°N 02.24°W	SO8341
Hanley Child	Worcestershire	52.28°N 02.51°W	SO6565
Hanley Swan	Worcestershire	52.07°N 02.27°W	SO8142
Hanley William	Worcestershire	52.28°N 02.48°W	SO6765
Hanlith	North Yorkshire	54.04°N 02.15°W	SD9061
Hanmer	Wrexham	52.94°N 02.82°W	SJ4539
Hannaford	Devon	51.04°N 03.99°W	SS6029
Hannafore	Cornwall	50.34°N 04.46°W	SX2552
Hannah cum Hagnaby	Lincolnshire	53.28°N 00.24°E	TF5079
Hanningfield Green	Suffolk	52.15°N 00.73°E	TL8754
Hannington	Northamptonshire	52.33°N 00.81°W	SP8171
Hannington	Swindon	51.63°N 01.75°W	SU1793
Hannington	Hampshire	51.29°N 01.22°W	SU5455
Hannington Wick	Swindon	51.65°N 01.75°W	SU1795
Hanscombe End	Bedfordshire	51.98°N 00.38°W	TL1133
Hansel	Devon	50.31°N 03.65°W	SX8247
Hansel Village	South Ayrshire	55.53°N 04.56°W	NS3830
Hansley Cross	Staffordshire	52.97°N 01.91°W	SK0642
Hanslope	Milton Keynes	52.10°N 00.83°W	SP8046
Hanthorpe	Lincolnshire	52.80°N 00.39°W	TF0824
Hanwell	Oxfordshire	52.08°N 01.37°W	SP4343
Hanwell	Ealing	51.50°N 00.34°W	TQ1580
Hanwood	Shropshire	52.67°N 02.82°W	SJ4409
Hanwood Bank	Shropshire	52.68°N 02.82°W	SJ4410
Hanworth	Berkshire	51.38°N 00.76°W	SU8666
Hanworth	Hounslow	51.42°N 00.39°W	TQ1271
Hanworth	Norfolk	52.86°N 01.25°E	TG1935
Happisburgh	Norfolk	52.81°N 01.53°E	TG3830
Happisburgh Common	Norfolk	52.80°N 01.51°E	TG3729
Hapsford	Somerset	51.23°N 02.35°W	ST7549
Hapsford	Cheshire	53.26°N 02.79°W	SJ4774
Hapton	Norfolk	52.51°N 01.19°E	TM1796
Hapton	Lancashire	53.77°N 02.32°W	SD7931

== Har ==
Location	Locality	Coordinates (links to map & photo sources)	OS grid reference
Harberton	Devon	50.40°N 03.73°W	SX7758
Harbertonford	Devon	50.39°N 03.71°W	SX7856
Harbledown	Kent	51.28°N 01.05°E	TR1358
Harborne	Birmingham	52.45°N 01.97°W	SP0284
Harborough Magna	Warwickshire	52.40°N 01.31°W	SP4779
Harborough Parva	Warwickshire	52.39°N 01.31°W	SP4778
Harbottle	Northumberland	55.33°N 02.11°W	NT9304
Harbour Heights	East Sussex	50.78°N 00.02°E	TQ4300
Harbourland	Kent	51.28°N 00.53°E	TQ7757
Harbourneford	Devon	50.44°N 03.81°W	SX7162
Harbours Hill	Worcestershire	52.28°N 02.07°W	SO9565
Harbour Village	Pembrokeshire	52.00°N 05.00°W	SM9438
Harbridge	Hampshire	50.88°N 01.80°W	SU1410
Harbridge Green	Hampshire	50.88°N 01.80°W	SU1410
Harburn	West Lothian	55.83°N 03.53°W	NT0461
Harbury	Warwickshire	52.22°N 01.45°W	SP3759
Harby	Nottinghamshire	53.22°N 00.69°W	SK8770
Harby	Leicestershire	52.87°N 00.90°W	SK7431
Harcombe (Chudleigh)	Devon	50.61°N 03.58°W	SX8881
Harcombe (Sidmouth)	Devon	50.70°N 03.20°W	SY1590
Harcombe Bottom	Devon	50.75°N 02.95°W	SY3395
Harcourt	Cornwall	50.19°N 05.06°W	SW8137
Harcourt Hill	Oxfordshire	51.73°N 01.29°W	SP4904
Hardeicke	Gloucestershire	51.80°N 02.29°W	SO8012
Harden	Bradford	53.83°N 01.87°W	SE0838
Harden	Barnsley	53.52°N 01.77°W	SE1503
Harden	Walsall	52.60°N 01.98°W	SK0101
Hardendale	Cumbria	54.52°N 02.65°W	NY5814
Harden Park	Cheshire	53.30°N 02.24°W	SJ8479
Hardgate	Dumfries and Galloway	54.97°N 03.86°W	NX8166
Hardgate	North Yorkshire	54.05°N 01.60°W	SE2662
Hardgate	Aberdeenshire	57.10°N 02.36°W	NJ7801
Hardgate	West Dunbartonshire	55.91°N 04.40°W	NS5072
Hargatewall	Derbyshire	53.27°N 01.83°W	SK1175
Hardham	West Sussex	50.94°N 00.53°W	TQ0317
Hardhorn	Lancashire	53.83°N 02.98°W	SD3538
Hardingham	Norfolk	52.58°N 01.01°E	TG0403
Hardings Booth	Staffordshire	53.17°N 01.91°W	SK0664
Hardingstone	Northamptonshire	52.20°N 00.88°W	SP7657
Hardings Wood	Staffordshire	53.08°N 02.25°W	SJ8354
Hardington	Somerset	51.26°N 02.37°W	ST7452
Hardington Mandeville	Somerset	50.89°N 02.69°W	ST5111
Hardington Marsh	Somerset	50.87°N 02.71°W	ST5009
Hardington Moor	Somerset	50.90°N 02.69°W	ST5112
Hardisworthy	Devon	50.95°N 04.53°W	SS2220
Hardley	Hampshire	50.83°N 01.39°W	SU4304
Hardley Street	Norfolk	52.55°N 01.50°E	TG3801
Hardmead	Milton Keynes	52.11°N 00.64°W	SP9347
Hardraw	North Yorkshire	54.31°N 02.21°W	SD8691
Hardstoft	Derbyshire	53.16°N 01.34°W	SK4463
Hardstoft Common	Derbyshire	53.16°N 01.35°W	SK4363
Hardway	Somerset	51.10°N 02.41°W	ST7134
Hardway	Hampshire	50.80°N 01.14°W	SU6001
Hardwick	Buckinghamshire	51.86°N 00.83°W	SP8019
Hardwick (Buckden)	Cambridgeshire	52.29°N 00.27°W	TL1868
Hardwick (South Cambridgeshire)	Cambridgeshire	52.21°N 00.00°E	TL3759
Hardwick	Norfolk	52.45°N 01.26°E	TM2289
Hardwick	Northamptonshire	52.31°N 00.75°W	SP8569
Hardwick (Banbury)	Oxfordshire	52.06°N 01.35°W	SP4441
Hardwick (Cherwell)	Oxfordshire	51.95°N 01.17°W	SP5729
Hardwick (West Oxfordshire)	Oxfordshire	51.75°N 01.45°W	SP3806
Hardwick	Rotherham	53.36°N 01.28°W	SK4886
Hardwick	Shropshire	52.50°N 02.94°W	SO3690
Hardwick	Stockton-on-Tees	54.58°N 01.36°W	NZ4121
Hardwick	Walsall	52.58°N 01.89°W	SP0799
Hardwicke	Herefordshire	52.08°N 03.08°W	SO2643
Hardwicke	Gloucestershire	51.94°N 02.14°W	SO9027
Hardwick Green	Worcestershire	51.98°N 02.27°W	SO8132
Hardwick Village	Nottinghamshire	53.26°N 01.05°W	SK6375
Hardy's Green	Essex	51.84°N 00.80°E	TL9320
Hare	Somerset	50.93°N 03.01°W	ST2915
Hare Appletree	Lancashire	54.01°N 02.71°W	SD5358
Hareby	Lincolnshire	53.16°N 00.01°W	TF3365
Harecroft	Bradford	53.81°N 01.87°W	SE0835
Hare Edge	Derbyshire	53.24°N 01.55°W	SK3072
Harefield	City of Southampton	50.91°N 01.34°W	SU4613
Harefield	Hillingdon	51.59°N 00.48°W	TQ0590
Harefield Grove	Hillingdon	51.60°N 00.48°W	TQ0591
Haregate	Staffordshire	53.11°N 02.01°W	SJ9957
Hare Green	Essex	51.87°N 01.03°E	TM0924
Hare Hatch	Berkshire	51.48°N 00.84°W	SU8077
Harehill	Derbyshire	52.91°N 01.74°W	SK1735
Harehills	Leeds	53.80°N 01.51°W	SE3234
Harehope	Scottish Borders	55.68°N 03.27°W	NT2044
Harelaw	Durham	54.86°N 01.75°W	NZ1652
Hareleeshill	South Lanarkshire	55.72°N 03.96°W	NS7750
Hareplain	Kent	51.12°N 00.61°E	TQ8339
Haresceugh	Cumbria	54.77°N 02.62°W	NY6042
Harescombe	Gloucestershire	51.78°N 02.24°W	SO8310
Haresfield	Gloucestershire	51.78°N 02.27°W	SO8110
Haresfield	Swindon	51.63°N 01.71°W	SU2093
Haresfinch	St Helens	53.46°N 02.73°W	SJ5197
Hareshaw	North Lanarkshire	55.81°N 03.90°W	NS8160
Harestanes	East Dunbartonshire	55.94°N 04.13°W	NS6774
Harestock	Hampshire	51.07°N 01.34°W	SU4631
Hare Street	Essex	51.76°N 00.07°E	TL4309
Hare Street (Ardeley)	Hertfordshire	51.93°N 00.09°W	TL3128
Hare Street (Hormead)	Hertfordshire	51.94°N 00.01°E	TL3829
Harewood	Leeds	53.90°N 01.51°W	SE3245
Harewood End	Herefordshire	51.93°N 02.69°W	SO5227
Harewood Hill	Bradford	53.83°N 01.94°W	SE0438
Harford (North Devon)	Devon	51.06°N 03.99°W	SS6031
Harford (South Hams)	Devon	50.41°N 03.92°W	SX6359
Hargate	Norfolk	52.47°N 01.10°E	TM1191
Hargate Hill	Derbyshire	53.43°N 01.98°W	SK0193
Hargrave	Bedfordshire	52.31°N 00.49°W	TL0370
Hargrave	Suffolk	52.20°N 00.58°E	TL7759
Hargrave	Cheshire	53.15°N 02.77°W	SJ4862
Harker	Cumbria	54.93°N 02.95°W	NY3960
Harker Marsh	Cumbria	54.69°N 03.46°W	NY0634
Harkland	Shetland Islands	60.58°N 01.19°W	HU4489
Harknett's Gate	Essex	51.73°N 00.05°E	TL4206
Harkstead	Suffolk	51.96°N 01.17°E	TM1834
Harlaston	Staffordshire	52.68°N 01.69°W	SK2110
Harlaxton	Lincolnshire	52.87°N 00.69°W	SK8832
Harlech	Gwynedd	52.85°N 04.11°W	SH5831
Harlequin	Nottinghamshire	52.94°N 01.03°W	SK6539
Harlescott	Shropshire	52.73°N 02.72°W	SJ5115
Harlesden	Ealing	51.53°N 00.25°W	TQ2183
Harlesthorpe	Derbyshire	53.27°N 01.26°W	SK4976
Harleston	Devon	50.29°N 03.70°W	SX7945
Harleston	Norfolk	52.39°N 01.29°E	TM2483
Harleston	Suffolk	52.20°N 00.94°E	TM0160
Harlestone	Northamptonshire	52.27°N 00.97°W	SP7064
Harle Syke	Lancashire	53.81°N 02.21°W	SD8635
Harley	Barnsley	53.47°N 01.45°W	SK3698
Harley	Shropshire	52.60°N 02.60°W	SJ5901
Harley Shute	East Sussex	50.85°N 00.52°E	TQ7809
Harleywood	Gloucestershire	51.68°N 02.23°W	ST8498
Harling Road	Norfolk	52.44°N 00.89°E	TL9787
Harlington	Bedfordshire	51.95°N 00.50°W	TL0330
Harlington	Doncaster	53.51°N 01.27°W	SE4802
Harlington	Hillingdon	51.48°N 00.44°W	TQ0877
Harlosh	Highland	57.37°N 06.52°W	NG2841
Harlosh Island	Highland	57.36°N 06.52°W	NG281392
Harlow	Essex	51.76°N 00.09°E	TL4509
Harlow Carr	North Yorkshire	53.98°N 01.57°W	SE2854
Harlow Green	Gateshead	54.91°N 01.59°W	NZ2658
Harlow Hill	Northumberland	55.00°N 01.89°W	NZ0768
Harlow Hill	North Yorkshire	53.98°N 01.57°W	SE2854
Harlthorpe	East Riding of Yorkshire	53.82°N 00.87°W	SE7437
Harlton	Cambridgeshire	52.14°N 00.01°E	TL3852
Harlyn	Cornwall	50.53°N 05.00°W	SW8775
Harman's Corner	Kent	51.32°N 00.69°E	TQ8862
Harman's Cross	Dorset	50.61°N 02.02°W	SY9880
Harmans Water	Berkshire	51.40°N 00.75°W	SU8768
Harmby	North Yorkshire	54.29°N 01.81°W	SE1289
Harmer Green	Hertfordshire	51.82°N 00.18°W	TL2516
Harmer Hill	Shropshire	52.79°N 02.77°W	SJ4822
Harmondsworth	Hillingdon	51.48°N 00.48°W	TQ0577
Harmston	Lincolnshire	53.14°N 00.55°W	SK9762
Harnage	Shropshire	52.63°N 02.65°W	SJ5604
Harnham	Wiltshire	51.05°N 01.81°W	SU1328
Harnham	Northumberland	55.11°N 01.89°W	NZ0780
Harnhill	Gloucestershire	51.69°N 01.90°W	SP0700
Harold Hill	Havering	51.60°N 00.22°E	TQ5492
Harold Park	Havering	51.59°N 00.23°E	TQ5591
Haroldston West	Pembrokeshire	51.79°N 05.10°W	SM8615
Haroldswick	Shetland Islands	60.78°N 00.84°W	HP6312
Harold Wood	Havering	51.58°N 00.22°E	TQ5490
Harome	North Yorkshire	54.22°N 01.01°W	SE6481
Harpenden	Hertfordshire	51.81°N 00.36°W	TL1314
Harpenden Common	Hertfordshire	51.80°N 00.36°W	TL1313
Harper Green	Bolton	53.55°N 02.42°W	SD7206
Harperley	Durham	54.87°N 01.73°W	NZ1753
Harper's Gate	Staffordshire	53.11°N 02.07°W	SJ9557
Harper's Green	Norfolk	52.76°N 00.87°E	TF9422
Harpford	Devon	50.70°N 03.29°W	SY0990
Harpham	East Riding of Yorkshire	54.03°N 00.33°W	TA0961
Harpley	Worcestershire	52.24°N 02.47°W	SO6861
Harpley	Norfolk	52.79°N 00.63°E	TF7825
Harpole	Northamptonshire	52.23°N 00.99°W	SP6960
Harpsden	Oxfordshire	51.51°N 00.90°W	SU7680
Harpsden Bottom	Oxfordshire	51.51°N 00.92°W	SU7580
Harpswell	Lincolnshire	53.39°N 00.60°W	SK9389
Harpton	Powys	52.22°N 03.12°W	SO2359
Harpurhey	Manchester	53.50°N 02.21°W	SD8601
Harpur Hill	Derbyshire	53.23°N 01.91°W	SK0671
Harraby	Cumbria	54.87°N 02.90°W	NY4254
Harracott	Devon	51.01°N 04.06°W	SS5526
Harrapool	Highland	57.23°N 05.89°W	NG6523
Harras	Cumbria	54.54°N 03.57°W	NX9818
Harraton	Sunderland	54.88°N 01.54°W	NZ2954
Harrietfield	Perth and Kinross	56.44°N 03.65°W	NN9829
Harrietsham	Kent	51.23°N 00.67°E	TQ8752
Harringay	Haringey	51.57°N 00.11°W	TQ3188
Harrington	Northamptonshire	52.41°N 00.86°W	SP7780
Harrington	Cumbria	54.61°N 03.58°W	NX9825
Harrington	Lincolnshire	53.21°N 00.03°E	TF3671
Harringworth	Northamptonshire	52.56°N 00.65°W	SP9197
Harris	Western Isles	57.87°N 06.85°W	NG122977
Harriseahead	Staffordshire	53.10°N 02.21°W	SJ8656
Harriston	Cumbria	54.75°N 03.30°W	NY1641
Harrogate	North Yorkshire	53.99°N 01.54°W	SE3055
Harrold	Bedfordshire	52.19°N 00.62°W	SP9456
Harrop Dale	Oldham	53.56°N 02.00°W	SE0008
Harrow	London Borough of Harrow	51.57°N 00.35°W	TQ1488
Harrowbarrow	Cornwall	50.49°N 04.27°W	SX3969
Harrowbeer	Devon	50.49°N 04.10°W	SX5168
Harrowden	Bedfordshire	52.11°N 00.45°W	TL0647
Harrowgate Hill	Darlington	54.53°N 01.55°W	NZ2916
Harrowgate Village	Darlington	54.54°N 01.56°W	NZ2817
Harrow Green	Suffolk	52.15°N 00.70°E	TL8554
Harrow Hill	Gloucestershire	51.84°N 02.52°W	SO6416
Harrow on the Hill	Harrow	51.56°N 00.34°W	TQ1586
Harrow Weald	Harrow	51.59°N 00.34°W	TQ1590
Harry Stoke	South Gloucestershire	51.49°N 02.54°W	ST6278
Harston	Cambridgeshire	52.13°N 00.07°E	TL4251
Harston	Leicestershire	52.87°N 00.76°W	SK8331
Harswell	East Riding of Yorkshire	53.85°N 00.75°W	SE8240
Hart	Hartlepool	54.70°N 01.27°W	NZ4735
Hartbarrow	Cumbria	54.30°N 02.92°W	SD4090
Hartburn	Stockton-on-Tees	54.55°N 01.35°W	NZ4218
Hartburn	Northumberland	55.16°N 01.87°W	NZ0886
Hartcliffe	North Somerset	51.40°N 02.60°W	ST5867
Hart Common	Bolton	53.54°N 02.55°W	SD6305
Hartest	Suffolk	52.13°N 00.67°E	TL8352
Hartest Hill	Suffolk	52.13°N 00.67°E	TL8352
Hartfield	East Sussex	51.09°N 00.09°E	TQ4735
Hartford	Somerset	51.05°N 03.49°W	SS9529
Hartford	Cambridgeshire	52.33°N 00.16°W	TL2572
Hartford	Cheshire	53.23°N 02.55°W	SJ6371
Hartfordbeach	Cheshire	53.24°N 02.55°W	SJ6372
Hartfordbridge	Hampshire	51.30°N 00.89°W	SU7757
Hartford End	Essex	51.82°N 00.43°E	TL6817
Hartforth	North Yorkshire	54.44°N 01.73°W	NZ1706
Hartgrove	Dorset	50.96°N 02.22°W	ST8418
Hartham	Hertfordshire	51.80°N 00.08°W	TL3213
Hart Hill	Luton	51.88°N 00.40°W	TL1022
Harthill	Rotherham	53.31°N 01.26°W	SK4980
Harthill	Cheshire	53.09°N 02.74°W	SJ5055
Harthill	North Lanarkshire	55.85°N 03.75°W	NS9064
Hartington	Derbyshire	53.13°N 01.82°W	SK1260
Hartland	Devon	50.98°N 04.49°W	SS2524
Hartland Point	Devon	51.01°N 04.51°W	SS237269
Hartle	Worcestershire	52.38°N 02.11°W	SO9276
Hartlebury	Shropshire	52.57°N 02.38°W	SO7497
Hartlebury	Worcestershire	52.32°N 02.25°W	SO8370
Hartlebury Common	Worcestershire	52.32°N 02.26°W	SO8270
Hartlepool	Durham	54.68°N 01.22°W	NZ5032
Hartley	Devon	50.39°N 04.14°W	SX4857
Hartley (Cranbrook)	Kent	51.07°N 00.49°E	TQ7534
Hartley (Sevenoaks)	Kent	51.37°N 00.29°E	TQ6067
Hartley	Cumbria	54.46°N 02.34°W	NY7808
Hartley Green	Kent	51.37°N 00.29°E	TQ6067
Hartley Green	Staffordshire	52.85°N 02.04°W	SJ9729
Hartley Mauditt	Hampshire	51.11°N 00.94°W	SU7436
Hartley Wespall	Hampshire	51.31°N 01.01°W	SU6958
Hartley Wintney	Hampshire	51.29°N 00.91°W	SU7656
Hartlington	North Yorkshire	54.04°N 01.95°W	SE0361
Hartlip	Kent	51.34°N 00.62°E	TQ8364
Hartmoor	Dorset	51.01°N 02.34°W	ST7624
Hartmount	Highland	57.76°N 04.10°W	NH7577
Hartoft End	North Yorkshire	54.31°N 00.86°W	SE7492
Harton	Shropshire	52.48°N 02.76°W	SO4888
Harton	Tyne and Wear	54.96°N 01.42°W	NZ3764
Harton	North Yorkshire	54.04°N 00.93°W	SE7061
Hartpury	Gloucestershire	51.92°N 02.30°W	SO7925
Hartsgreen	Shropshire	52.44°N 02.31°W	SO7983
Hart's Green	Suffolk	52.16°N 00.73°E	TL8755
Hartshead	Kirklees	53.69°N 01.72°W	SE1822
Hartshead Green	Tameside	53.50°N 02.06°W	SD9601
Hartshead Moor Side	Calderdale	53.71°N 01.74°W	SE1724
Hartshead Moor Top	Calderdale	53.72°N 01.75°W	SE1625
Hartshead Pike	Tameside	53.51°N 02.06°W	SD9602
Hartshill	Warwickshire	52.53°N 01.52°W	SP3293
Hartshill	City of Stoke-on-Trent	53.00°N 02.21°W	SJ8645
Hart's Hill	Dudley	52.49°N 02.11°W	SO9288
Hartshill Green	Warwickshire	52.54°N 01.52°W	SP3294
Hartshorne	Derbyshire	52.78°N 01.52°W	SK3221
Hartsop	Cumbria	54.50°N 02.92°W	NY4013
Hart Station	Hartlepool	54.71°N 01.25°W	NZ4836
Hartswell	Somerset	51.03°N 03.31°W	ST0827
Hartwell	Buckinghamshire	51.80°N 00.85°W	SP7912
Hartwell	Northamptonshire	52.14°N 00.86°W	SP7850
Hartwell	Staffordshire	52.94°N 02.13°W	SJ9139
Hartwith	North Yorkshire	54.04°N 01.68°W	SE2161
Hartwood	Lancashire	53.66°N 02.63°W	SD5819
Hartwood	North Lanarkshire	55.81°N 03.85°W	NS8459
Hartwoodburn	Scottish Borders	55.52°N 02.84°W	NT4726
Harvel	Kent	51.34°N 00.35°E	TQ6463
Harvest Hill	Coventry	52.43°N 01.58°W	SP2882
Harvills Hawthorn	Sandwell	52.53°N 02.03°W	SO9893
Harvington (Chaddesley Corbett)	Worcestershire	52.36°N 02.19°W	SO8774
Harvington (Evesham)	Worcestershire	52.13°N 01.92°W	SP0549
Harwell	Oxfordshire	51.59°N 01.29°W	SU4989
Harwell	Nottinghamshire	53.41°N 00.97°W	SK6891
Harwich	Essex	51.93°N 01.25°E	TM2431
Harwood	Durham	54.69°N 02.28°W	NY8233
Harwood	Bolton	53.59°N 02.37°W	SD7511
Harwood Dale	North Yorkshire	54.34°N 00.52°W	SE9695
Harwood Lee	Bolton	53.60°N 02.39°W	SD7412
Harwood on Teviot	Scottish Borders	55.37°N 02.88°W	NT4409
Harworth	Nottinghamshire	53.41°N 01.08°W	SK6191
