= List of shipwrecks in November 1858 =

List of shipwrecks in November 1858 includes ships sunk, foundered, wrecked, grounded, or otherwise lost during November 1858.

== 1 November ==
List of shipwrecks: 1 November 1858
Ship	State	Description
Dundonald	United Kingdom	The ship was destroyed by fire in the Gulf of Aden 90 nautical miles (170 km) east of Aden. Her crew were rescued by Tippoo Saib ( India. Dundonald was on a voyage from London to Aden.
Eliza and Hester	United Kingdom	The barque was driven ashore at Odesa. She was refloated on 4 November.
Ellen Morris	United Kingdom	The barque was in collision with the full-rigged ship Palmyra (United Kingdom) and foundered in the English Channel off Portland Bill, Dorset.
Hudson	Bremen	The steamship was gutted by fire at Bremerhaven. Subsequently rebuilt and returned to service.
Leadbitter	United Kingdom	The ship was lost off Trelleborg, Sweden. Her crew were rescued.
Ritterschaft	Grand Duchy of Mecklenburg-Schwerin	The ship was abandoned in the South Atlantic. Her crew were rescued by Abbots (United Kingdom). Ritterschaft was on a voyage from Glasgow, Renfrewshire, United Kingdom to Valparaíso, Chile.
HMS Urgent	Royal Navy	The troopship ran aground on the East Pole Sands, off the Isle of Wight. She was on a voyage from Corfu, United States of the Ionian Islands to Portsmouth, Hampshire. She was refloated with the assistance of the tug Echo (United Kingdom.
Vesper	United Kingdom	The schooner was driven ashore and wrecked on Ameland, Friesland, Netherlands. She was on a voyage from Leith, Lothian to Emden, Kingdom of Hanover.

== 2 November ==
List of shipwrecks: 2 November 1858
Ship	State	Description
Caledonia	United Kingdom	The ship was driven ashore and wrecked near Bremen with the loss of six of her eight crew. She was on a voyage from Middlesbrough, Yorkshire to Hamburg.
Charlotte	United Kingdom	The ship was destroyed by fire at Mobile, Alabama, United States.
Crown	(United Kingdom of Great Britain and Ireland) British North America	The ship was abandoned in the Atlantic Ocean. All on board were rescued by J. J. Boyd (United States). Crown was on a voyage from Viana do Castelo, Portugal to Saint John, New Brunswick.
Louisa	Stralsund	The schooner collided with another schooner in the English Channel off Portland Bill, Dorset, United Kingdom. Three of her five crew got aboard the schooner. The remaining two abandoned her the next day. They were rescued by Celesta (Flag unknown). Louisa was on a voyage from Dublin, United Kingdom to Königsberg, Prussia.
Manoy	Flag unknown	The ship was driven ashore in the Kinfai Pass. She was on a voyage from Foo Choo Foo to Shanghai, China.
Prosper	United Kingdom	The schooner capsized off Öland, Sweden and drove ashore with the loss of all hands.
Seaton	United Kingdom	The steamship ran aground on the Whitby Rock. She was on a voyage from Sunderland, County Durham to London. She was refloated with the assistance of two tugs and resumed her voyage.

== 3 November ==
List of shipwrecks: 3 November 1858
Ship	State	Description
Columbia	United Kingdom	The ship was discovered abandoned and waterlogged in the Atlantic Ocean. She was set afire.
Eliza and Hester	United Kingdom	The barque was driven ashore at Odesa. She was on a voyage from South Shields, County Durham to Odesa.

== 4 November ==
List of shipwrecks: 4 November 1858
Ship	State	Description
Caraguena	France	The barque was driven ashore 10 nautical miles (19 km) from Key West, Florida, United States. She was abandoned the next day. She was on a voyage from Minatitlán, Mexico to Havre de Grâce.
East Anglian	United Kingdom	The barque was abandoned in the Black Sea. She sank on 6 November 20 nautical miles (37 km) off Cape Emine, Ottoman Empire. She was on a voyage from Odesa to Wisbech, Cambridgeshire.
Militades	United Kingdom	The ship was abandoned in the Atlantic Ocean. Her crew were rescued by American Congress (United States). Militades was on a voyage from Saint John's, Newfoundland, British North America to London.
Tesino	Prussia	The brigantine ran aground at Barcelona, Spain. Her crew were rescued by a Spanish Navy warship.
Trofano	Austrian Empire	The brig ran aground on the Grado Bank, in the Adriatic Sea.
Twenty-ninth of May	United Kingdom	The collier, a barque, was damaged by fire at Bremerhaven.

== 5 November ==
List of shipwrecks: 5 November 1858
Ship	State	Description
Admiral Tromp	Netherlands	The ship ran aground and was damaged at North Shields, County Durham, United Kingdom. She was on a voyage from North Shields to Surabaya, Netherlands East Indies. She was refloated.
Elizabeth	United Kingdom	The sloop was driven ashore at Eyemouth, Berwickshire. She was on a voyage from Newcastle upon Tyne, Northumberland to Leith, Lothian.
Emelyn	United Kingdom	The barque ran aground on the Gottska Sands, off the coast of Sweden. Her crew were rescued. She was on a voyage from Grimsby, Lincolnshire to Söderhamn, Sweden.
General Wiltshire	United Kingdom	The ship was abandoned in the Atlantic Ocean. Her crew were rescued by R. M. Sloman (United States). General Wiltshire was on a voyage from "Kooria Mooria" (Khuriya Muriya Islands) to Queenstown, County Cork.
Gratitude	United Kingdom	The ship ran aground off North Shields. She was on a voyage from North Shields to London. She was refloated.
John	United Kingdom	The ship was sighted in the North Sea 15 nautical miles (28 km) off Ostend, West Flanders, Belgium whilst on a voyage from Newcastle upon Tyne to Dunkirk, Nord. No further trace, presumed foundered with the loss of all hands.
John and Mary	United Kingdom	The Mersey Flat sank on the West Hoyle Sandbank, in Liverpool Bay. Her crew were rescued. She was on a voyage from Llandulas, Anglesey to Liverpool, Lancashire.
Kate	United Kingdom	The ship driven ashore at Calais, France. She was on a voyage from London to Calais. She was refloated on 23 November and taken in to Calais.
Mayflower	United States	The ship ran aground on the Carysfort Reef. She was on a voyage from New Orleans, Louisiana to Trieste. She was refloated and resumed her voyage.
Preciosa	Prussia	The brig driven ashore at Middleton, County Durham. She was on a voyage from Memel to Hartlepool, County Durham. She was refloated and taken in to Hartlepool, where she sank.
Robert Harper	United Kingdom	The ship ran aground on the West Hoyle Bank.
Warrior	United Kingdom	The sloop departed from Lerwick, Shetland Islands for Sunderland, County Durham. No further trace, presumed foundered with the loss of all hands.
York Merchant	United Kingdom	The sloop was wrecked at Trusthorpe, Lincolnshire with the loss of all six people on board. She was on a voyage from Great Yarmouth, Norfolk to Gainsborough, Lincolnshire.

== 6 November ==
List of shipwrecks: 6 November 1858
Ship	State	Description
Albion	United Kingdom	The Yorkshire Billyboy was driven ashore and wrecked east of Wells-next-the-Sea, Norfolk with the loss of a crew member. She was on a voyage from London to Hull, Yorkshire.
Champion	United Kingdom	The ship ran aground at Lowestoft, Suffolk and was severely damaged. She was on a voyage from Lowestoft to Seaham, County Durham.
Elizabeth	United Kingdom	The barque ran aground on Scroby Sands, Norfolk. Her crew were rescued by Decision (United Kingdom). Elizabeth was on a voyage from "Wyborg" to London. The wreck was beached at Great Yarmouth, Norfolk later that day.
Hendrik Carel	Netherlands	The ship was driven ashore and wrecked at Grenaa, Denmark. Her crew were rescued. She was on a voyage from Saint Petersburg, Russia to London.
Lord Hill	United Kingdom	The schooner ran aground on the Herd Sand, in the North Sea off the coast of County Durham. She was on a voyage from Hartlepool, County Durham to Inverness. She was refloated and taken in to North Shields.
Malabar	Kingdom of Sardinia	The ship was wrecked in Table Bay. Her crew were rescued. She was on a voyage from London to Aden.
Maria Louise	Kingdom of Hanover	The schooner foundered in the North Sea (53°21′N 1°32′E}). Her crew were rescued. She was on her maiden voyage from Leer to Newcastle upon TyneNorthumberland, United Kingdom.
Mary	United Kingdom	The sloop was driven ashore at Holkham, Norfolk. All on board were rescued. She was on a voyage from Hull to Calais, France.
Medora	United Kingdom	The brig ran aground at South Shields, County Durham. She was on a voyage from London to South Shields. She was refloated and taken in to East Hartlepool, County Durham.
Metta Claudine	Denmark	The ship driven ashore and wrecked at Grainthorpe, Lincolnshire, United Kingdom. She was on a voyage from Horsens to Hull, Yorkshire, United Kingdom.
Neptunus	Netherlands	The ship was driven ashore and wrecked at Allinge, Denmark with the loss of at least nine lives.
Teazer	United Kingdom	The smack was run down and sunk off Great Orme Head, Caernarfonshire. Her crew survived. She was on a voyage from Liverpool, Lancashire to Dublin.
Volante	United Kingdom	The brig ran aground on the Stony Binks, off the mouth of the Humber. She was refloated and put in to Grimsby, Lincolnshire in a leaky condition.
Weary Maid	United Kingdom	The ship sank at Milford Haven, Pembrokeshire. She was on a voyage from Liverpool to Milford Haven.
Ythan	United Kingdom	The ship was run into by a brig off the mouth of the Humber. She was run ashore at Spurn Point, Yorkshire and wrecked. Her crew were rescued. She had become a wreck by 8 November.

== 7 November ==
List of shipwrecks: 7 November 1858
Ship	State	Description
Atlantic	United Kingdom	The ship was driven ashore at Cowden, Yorkshire. Her crew were rescued. She was on a voyage from London to South Shields, County Durham. Atlantic broke up the next day.
Freedom	United Kingdom	The barque was abandoned in the Bay of Biscay (43°00′N 11°53′W). Her eleven crew were rescued by Romilly (United Kingdom). Freedom was on a voyage from South Shields to Genoa, Kingdom of Sardinia.
Helene	Netherlands	The ship sank 7 Danish miles (28.4706 nautical miles (52.7275 km)) north east of Bornholm, Denmark. Her crew were rescued. She was on a voyage from Königsberg, Prussia to Copenhagen, Denmark.
Prince Albert	United Kingdom	The ship ran aground on the Platters, in the North Sea. She was on a voyage from South Shields, County Durham to Rotterdam, South Holland, Netherlands. She was refloated and assisted in to Harwich, Essex by three smacks.
Three Sons	United Kingdom	The brig foundered in the North Sea off Texel, North Holland, Netherlands. Her crew took to the long boat; they were rescued by the fishing smack Star (United Kingdom). Three Sons was on a voyage from South Shields, County Durham to Amsterdam, North Holland.

== 8 November ==
List of shipwrecks: 8 November 1858
Ship	State	Description
Admiral	Russia	The steamship was driven ashore at Bolderāja. She was refloated by 11 November and taken in to Bolderāja.
Armanilla	United Kingdom	The schooner sprang a leak and foundered off the coast of County Antrim. Her cre were rescued. She was on a voyage from Workington, Cumberland to the Belfast Lough.
Coonpeer	United Kingdom	The schooner departed from Liverpool for São Miguel Island, Azores. No further trace, presumed foundered with the loss of all hands.
Fortuna	Prussia	The schooner was wrecked at Fraserburgh, Aberdeenshire, United Kingdom. Her crew were rescued by the Coast Guard.
Hampton	United Kingdom	The ship ran aground and capsized at Lowestoft, Suffolk.
Magdalena Maria	Kingdom of Hanover	The ship was wrecked off "Hunsbee Klit". Her crew were rescued. She was on a voyage from Kristiansand, Norway to Bremen.

== 9 November ==
List of shipwrecks: 9 November 1858
Ship	State	Description
Amity	United Kingdom	The brig ran aground at Seaham, County Durham. She was refloated and put in to Scarborough, Yorkshire in a leaky condition.
Boyne Castle	United Kingdom	The sloop was wrecked east of Lossiemouth, Moray. Her crew were rescued. She was on a voyage from Inverness to Portsoy, Aberdeenshire.
Delphin	Stettin	The brig ran aground off "Vineta". She was on a voyage from Sunderland, County Durham, United Kingdom to Stettin.
Emmi	Austrian Empire	The brig was wrecked at "Orlonia". Her crew were rescued.
Eureka	United Kingdom	The ship ran aground on the Middle Sand, in the North Sea off the coast of Essex. She was on a voyage from Gothenburg, Sweden to London. She was refloated and resumed her voyage.
Gresciosa	Austrian Empire	The brig was wrecked at "Orlonia". Her crew were rescued.
Jeune Pauline	France	The galiot was wrecked on the Gamelle, in the English Channel off the coast of Finistère. Her crew were rescued. She was on a voyage from Bilbao, France to Vannes, Morbihan.
Nicolina	Flag unknown	The brig ran aground and was damaged at Hull, Yorkshire, United Kingdom. She was on a voyage from Kronstadt, Russia to Hull.
Polynesia	United Kingdom	The ship was driven ashore and wrecked "at Roman River".
Sappho	United Kingdom	The barque was driven ashore and wrecked in the Black Sea near the entrance to the Bosphorus. Her crew were rescued. She was on a voyage from Sunderland, County Durham to Galaţi, Ottoman Empire.
Timandra	(United Kingdom of Great Britain and Ireland) New South Wales	The ship sank at Newcastle.
Waldberg und Catharina	Netherlands	The ship collided with the steamship Weser (Bremen) and sank in the North Sea 17 nautical miles (31 km) off Newcastle upon Tyne, Northumberland, United Kingdom. Her crew were rescued by Weser. Waldberg und Catharina was on a voyage from Newcastle upon Tyne to Rotterdam, South Holland.

== 10 November ==
List of shipwrecks: 10 November 1858
Ship	State	Description
Aimable Eulalie	France	The ship was driven ashore at Le Conquet, Finistère. She was on a voyage from Dunkirk, Nord to Nantes, Loire-Inférieure.
Anna	United Kingdom	The ship was driven ashore at Rønne, Denmark. She was on a voyage from Vyborg, Grand Duchy of Finland to Hull, Yorkshire. She was refloated the next day.
Charlotte	United Kingdom	The full-rigged ship was driven ashore and wrecked on the coast of Livonia, Russia. She was on a voyage from Riga, Russia to Aberdeen.
Fanny Fosdick	United Kingdom	The ship was destroyed by fire at Savannah, Georgia, United States. She was on a voyage from New Orleans, Louisiana, United States to London.
Henry Bell	United Kingdom	The brig was driven ashore on Scharhörn. She was a total loss.
Maria Laurentina	Netherlands	The brigantine foundered 1 nautical mile (1.9 km) east of Torremolinos, Spain with the loss of all but one of her crew. She was on a voyage from Newport, Monmouthshire, United Kingdom to Valencia, Spain.
Mary	United Kingdom	The schooner was wrecked at Mwnt, Cardiganshire. She was on a voyage from Caernarfon to Cardigan.
Mary	United Kingdom	The schooner collided with the schooner Gazelle (United Kingdom) and sank off Plymouth, Devon. Her crew were rescued . She was on a voyage from Plymouth to Liverpool, Lancashire.
Ocean Queen	United Kingdom	The ship driven ashore near Narva, Russia. She was refloated and towed in to Kronstadt, Russia.
O. D.	Russia	The ship arrived in The Downs with her cargo on fire. She was on a voyage from Porto, Portugal to Riga. She was towed in to Ramsgate, Kent, United Kingdom, where she was scuttled.
Reindeer	Flag unknown	The steamship was driven ashore and wrecked at Pillau, Prussia. She was on a voyage from Memel to Pillau.
Schmidt	Wismar	The brig was driven ashore and wrecked on Alboran Island, Spain with the loss of two of her twelve crew.
Tesoro	Austrian Empire	The brig was driven ashore and wrecked at Gibraltar. She was on a voyage from Cardiff, Glamorgan, United Kingdom to Venice, Kingdom of Lombardy–Venetia.

== 11 November ==
List of shipwrecks: 11 November 1858
Ship	State	Description
Acastus	United Kingdom	The ship departed from Liverpool, Lancashire for the British Cameroons. No further trace, presumed foundered with the loss of all hands.
Albert St. Paul	United Kingdom	The ship was abandoned in the Atlantic Ocean. Her crew were rescued on 13 November by the barque Percy (United Kingdom). Albert St. Paul was on a voyage from Cardiff, Glamorgan to Miramichi, New Brunswick, British North America.
Anna Maria	Kingdom of Hanover	The schooner collided with another vessel and foundered off "Cape Sparta". Her crew were rescued by the other vessel, except of one rescued by the barque Annie (United Kingdom).
Camilla	France	The ship ran aground on the Batten Reef, off the coast of Devon, United Kingdom. She was on a voyage from Saint-Malo, Ille-et-Vilaine to Plymouth, Devon. Camilla was refloated on 22 November and taken in to Plymouth, Devon.
Challenge	(United Kingdom of Great Britain and Ireland) British North America	The brig was wrecked at Saint John's, Newfoundland with the loss of three of her crew. She was on a voyage from Ardrossan, Ayrshire to Yarmouth, Nova Scotia.
Circe	United Kingdom	The ship was abandoned with the loss of a crew member and foundered. Survivors were rescued by the full-rigged ship Lady Havelock (United Kingdom). Circe was on a voyage from Cephalonia, United States of the Ionian Islands to a British port.
Corunna	Spain	The ship was driven ashore at Helsingør, Denmark. She was on a voyage from Danzig to London, United Kingdom.
Dom Affonso	United Kingdom	The steamship was abandoned in the Atlantic Ocean. Her crew were rescued by the brig Henry Wytch ( Austrian Empire). Dom Affonso was on a voyage from the Clyde to Gibraltar.
Huntcliffe	United Kingdom	The ship wrecked on the Nervo Rocks, off Pitkasääremaa, Russia. Her crew were rescued. She was on a voyage from Kronstadt, Russia to London.
Margaret	Kingdom of Hanover	The schooner ran aground at Cádiz, Spain. She was on a voyage from Newcastle upon Tyne, Northumberland, United Kingdom to Cádiz.
Princess Royal	United Kingdom	The ship sank in the North Sea 74 nautical miles (137 km) east of Flamborough Head, Yorkshire. Her crew were rescued. She was on a voyage from Hamburg to West Hartlepool, County Durham.
Royal Oak	United Kingdom	The ship foundered in the Atlantic Ocean. Her crew were rescued by the brig Antoinetta y Junita (Spain).
Runeberg	Sweden	The ship was wrecked at Cruden Bay, Aberdeenshire, United Kingdom. Her crew were rescued. She was on a voyage from South Shields, County Durham, United Kingdom to Barcelona, Spain.
Sarah Sands	United Kingdom	The ship caught fire in the Indian Ocean and was severely damaged. She was on a voyage from a British port to India. She put in to Mauritius on 23 November.
Sardus	United Kingdom	The ship ran aground on the Careless Rocks, on the coast of Cornwall. She was on a voyage from Newcastle upon Tyne, Northumberland to Naples, Kingdom of the Two Sicilies. She was refloated and taken in to Truro, Cornwall.
Starlight	United Kingdom	The full-rigged ship was driven ashore and wrecked at Havana, Cuba. She was on a voyage from Newport, Monmouthshire to Havana.
St. George	Greece	The brig was abandoned in the Atlantic Ocean. Her crew were rescued by Colgrain (United Kingdom). St. George was on a voyage from Newcastle upon Tyne to Athens.
Toronto	United Kingdom	The barque was abandoned in the Atlantic Ocean (44°12′N 15°00′W) All thirteen people on board were rescued by Malvina (Hamburg). Toronto was on a voyage from Liverpool, Lancashire to Constantinople, Ottoman Empire.
Vorwarts	Flag unknown	The ship was run down by Andreas (Flag unknown) and sank off Reval, Russia. She was on a voyage from Saint Petersburg, Russia to London, United Kingdom

== 12 November ==
List of shipwrecks: 12 November 1858
Ship	State	Description
Alice Munroe	United States	The ship was wrecked on the Isaacs. She was on a voyage from Liverpool, Lancashire, United Kingdom to New Orleans, Louisiana. She subsequently floated off and foundered.
Claremont	United States	The ship ran aground on the Herd Sand, in the North Sea off the coast of County Durham, United Kingdom. She was refloated and taken in to South Shields, County Durham.
Luigi	Kingdom of Lombardy–Venetia	The ship ran aground on the Herd Sand. She was refloated and taken in to South Shields.
Luigi P	Austrian Empire	The brig was wrecked at the Playa de Getares, Spain. She was on a voyage from Alexandria, Egypt to Cork or Falmouth, Cornwall, United Kingdom.
Silvia	United Kingdom	The ship ran aground on the Woolpack Sand, in the English Channel off the coast of Sussex. She was on a voyage from London to Cartagena, Spain. She was refloated.
Stanley	United Kingdom	The brig was driven ashore and wrecked at Cushendall, County Antrim with the loss of her captain. She was on a voyage from Glasgow, Renfrewshire to Motril, Spain. She was refloated on 11 February 1859.

== 13 November ==
List of shipwrecks: 13 November 1858
Ship	State	Description
Ajax	United Kingdom	The schooner was wrecked at Porthcawl, Glamorgan. Her six crew were rescued.
Aleanza	Austrian Empire	The brigantine was wrecked at "Corral de Vives", Spain with the loss of seven of her nine crew.
Alfonsa Maria	Flag unknown	The full-rigged ship ran aground and sank in the Baltic Sea. Her crew survived. She was on a voyage from Kronstadt, Russia to Bristol, Gloucestershire, United Kingdom.
Ana Maria	Spain	The brigantine was wrecked at Rosas. Three of her crew were confirmed to have been rescued.
Duckles	United Kingdom	The ship sprang a leak and sank in the North Sea 4 nautical miles (7.4 km) off the coast of Lincolnshire. She was on a voyage from Wisbech, Cambridgeshire to Goole, Yorkshire.
Greek Slave	United Kingdom	The brig caught fire off Blakeney, Norfolk and was severely damaged. She was escorted in to Grimsby, Lincolnshire by the smack Mary (United Kingdom).
Mariane	Netherlands	The galiot ran aground on the Herd Sand, in the North Sea off the coast of County Durham, United Kingdom. She was refloated.
Nareig	United Kingdom	The brig was abandoned in the Atlantic Ocean. Her crew took to a boat; they were rescued on 15 November by the barque Percy (United Kingdom). Nareig was on a voyage from Taganrog, Russia to Cork.
Portia	United Kingdom	The brig was driven ashore and wrecked at Lowestoft, Suffolk.
Rhumel	France	The steamship was wrecked at the mouth of the Ebro. Her crew were rescued. She was on a voyage from Marseille, Bouches-du-Rhône to Valencia, Spain.
Star of the East	United Kingdom	The fishing smack collided with the collier brig Hope (United Kingdom and foundered in the Boston Deeps with the loss of seven of her twelve crew. Survivors were rescued by Hope.

== 14 November ==
List of shipwrecks: 14 November 1858
Ship	State	Description
Bertha	Hamburg	The schooner sank in the Atlantic Ocean. Her crew were rescued by the steamship Europa (United Kingdom). Bertha was on a voyage from Newcastle upon Tyne, Northumberland, United Kingdom to Constantinople, Ottoman Empire.
Celerity	United Kingdom	The ketch struck the Lady Rock, in the Sound of Mull and was wrecked. She was on a voyage from Cardiff, Glamorgan to Lossiemouth, Moray.
Felicity	United Kingdom	The schooner was wrecked at Filey, Yorkshire. Her four crew were rescued by the Filey Lifeboat. She was on a voyage from Hartlepool, County Durham to King's Lynn, Norfolk.
Flora	United Kingdom	The schooner foundered in the Atlantic Ocean off Lisbon, Portugal. Her twelve crew were rescued by a Danish schooner. She was on a voyage from Cardiff, Glamorgan to Naples, Kingdom of the Two Sicilies.
Johanna	Netherlands	The brigantine was wrecked on Sancti Petri, Spain. Her crew were rescued. She was on a voyage from Newcastle upon Tyne to Marseille, Bouches-du-Rhône, France.
Pacific	United Kingdom	The brig was driven ashore at Hollum, Friesland, Netherlands. Her crew were rescued. She was on a voyage from Hartlepool to Hamburg.
Unnamed	Austrian Empire	The brig was wrecked on Lambay Island, County Dublin, United Kingdom. All thirteen people on board were rescued by the Skerries Lifeboat.

== 15 November ==
List of shipwrecks: 15 November 1858
Ship	State	Description
Abeona	United Kingdom	The full-rigged ship was wrecked on Terceira Island, Azores. Her 42 crew survived.
Antoinetta Amelia, and Pomona	Austrian Empire; Prussia	The barque Antoinetta Amelia collided with the Prussian brig Pomona in the Strait of Gibraltar. Both vessels sank. Antonietta Amelia's crew were rescued by Euchans (France) She was on a voyage from Cardiff, Glamorgan, United Kingdom to Venice, Kingdom of Lombardy–Venetia. Six of Pomona's ten crew drowned. She was on a voyage from Cardiff to Marseille, Bouches-du-Rhône, France.
Amy	United Kingdom	The sloop was driven ashore at Somercotes, Lincolnshire.
Antilles	Netherlands	The brig was driven ashore and severely damaged south of Barmston, Yorkshire, United Kingdom. Her crew were rescued by the Coast Guard. Antilles was on a voyage from Rotterdam, South Holland, Netherlands to South Shields, County Durham, United Kingdom. She was later refloated. She was refloated on 28 November and towed to Newcastle upon Tyne, Northumberland for repairs.
Belsay Castle	United Kingdom	The brig was driven ashore and wrecked at Muros de Nalón, Spain. Her crew were rescued. She was on a voyage from Sunderland, County Durham to Pravia, Spain.
Child of the Regiment	United States	The ship was abandoned in the Atlantic Ocean. Her crew were rescued by Bengal (United Kingdom). Child of the Regiment was on a voyage from Callao, Peru to Cowes, Isle of Wight, United Kingdom.
Dougay Trouin	France	The ship was driven ashore and wrecked near Cape de Plata, Spain, Her crew were rescued.
Drie Gebrueder	flag unknown	The ship driven ashore and wrecked on Hiiumaa, Russia. She was on a voyage from Kronstadt, Russia to London, United Kingdom.
Enterprise	United Kingdom	The steamship was driven onto the Brazil Bank, in Liverpool Bay . She was on a voyage from Dundalk, County Louth to Liverpool, Lancashire. She was refloated the next day.
Fortitude	United Kingdom	The barque sank in the Swin, off the coast of Essex with the loss of all hands. She was on a voyage from Brightlingsea, Essex to London.
Harwich, or Hunwick	United Kingdom	The steamship sprang a leak and sank at Great Yarmouth, Norfolk. Her crew reached land in their lifeboat. She was on a voyage from Hartlepool, County Durham to London
Huntley	United Kingdom	The steamship sank at Great Yarmouth. Her crew were rescued.
Industry	United Kingdom	The ship was driven ashore in Studland Bay, Dorset.
Luigi	Austrian Empire	The polacca was wrecked in Sandy Bay, Gibraltar. Her crew were rescued. She was on a voyage from Alexandria, Egypt Eyalet to an English port.
Norfolk	United Kingdom	The barque was abandoned in the Atlantic Ocean. Her crew were rescued by Tuscarora (United States). Norfolk was on a voyage from a Spanish port to Saint John's, Newfoundland, British North America.
Phoenix	United Kingdom	The ship was driven ashore and wrecked at Conil de la Frontera, Spain. Her crew were rescued. She was on a voyage from Newcastle upon Tyne, Northumberland to Alexandria.
Priscilla	United Kingdom	The barque was abandoned in the Atlantic Ocean. All on board were rescued by Ipswich (United Kingdom). Priscilla was on a voyage from Quebec City, Province of Canada, British North America to Plymouth, Devon. The derelict vessel came ashore in Donegal Bay on 1 January 1859.
Queen of the Isle	(United Kingdom of Great Britain and Ireland) Isle of Man	The lugger was abandoned. Her crew were rescued by the Castletown Lifeboat.
Robert	United Kingdom	The ship was wrecked on the Tongue Sand.
Scotia	United Kingdom	The ship was driven ashore and wrecked at Kirkcaldy, Fife. Her crew were rescued. She was on a voyage from Sunderland, County Durham to Rouen, Seine-Inférieure, France. Scotia was refloated on 22 November and taken in to Kirkcaldy.
Victoire	France	The full-rigged ship was wrecked on the Chipiona Rocks, near Cádiz, Spain. Her crew were rescued.
Wellington	United Kingdom	The ship was driven ashore in the River Thames at Greenhithe, Kent.

== 16 November ==
List of shipwrecks: 16 November 1858
Ship	State	Description
Aberdeen	United Kingdom	The full-rigged ship foundered in the Atlantic Ocean.
Annegien Deadix	Flag unknown	The ship was wrecked at Sanlúcar de Barrameda, Spain. She was on a voyage from London, United Kingdom to Smyrna, Ottoman Empire and the Danube.
Charlotte Louise Wilhelmina	Denmark	The full-rigged ship was driven ashore on the Danish coast. She was on a voyage from Hobro to an English port. She was refloated and taken in to Fredrikshavn.
Curlew	United Kingdom	The brig was wrecked on the Chipiona Rocks, near Cádiz, Spain with the loss of all hands. She was on a voyage from Venice, Kingdom of Lombardy–Venetia to London.
Hueger Benk	Netherlands	The ketch was wrecked on the Chipiona Rocks. Her crew were rescued. She was on a voyage from London to Smyrna, Ottoman Empire.
India	United Kingdom	The ship was driven ashore and wrecked at Covelong, India with the loss of a crew member. She was on a voyage from Madras to Covelong.
Jennifer	United Kingdom	The smack foundered at sea. Her crew were rescued by the chasse-marée Louis (France). Jennifer was on a voyage from Newport, Monmouthshire to Plymouth, Devon.
Matilda	United Kingdom	The brig ran aground on the Borcum Sand, in the North Sea. She was on a voyage from South Shields, County Durham to London. She was refloated and taken in to Grimsby, Lincolnshire in a severely leaky condition.
Regent	United Kingdom	The ship ran aground at South Shields. She was refloated and put back to South Shields in a leaky condition.
Swallow	United Kingdom	The ship ran aground at South Shields. She was on a voyage from South Shields to Chatham, Kent. She was refloated and resumed her voyage, but consequently put in to Grimsby to take on two extra hands.
Theophile Edouard	France	The full-rigged ship was driven ashore at Conil de la Frontera, Spain with the loss of eight of her 22 crew. She was on a voyage from Marseille, Bouches-du-Rhône to Cádiz.
Wilhelmina Maria	Netherlands	The ship was abandoned in the Atlantic Ocean. Her crew were rescued by Linda (United Kingdom). Wilhelmina Maria was on a voyage from Lisbon, Portugal to Vlaardingen, South Holland.

== 17 November ==
List of shipwrecks: 17 November 1858
Ship	State	Description
Blackburn	United Kingdom	The ship ran aground at Sulina, Ottoman Empire. She was on a voyage from Swansea, Glamorgan to Sulina.
Braunershaven	Netherlands	The smack was discovered abandoned off Bornholm, Denmark and was towed in by Thirty-one States (United States). Braunershaven was on a voyage from Saint Petersburg, Russia to London, United Kingdom.
Dean of Guild	United Kingdom	The schooner was wrecked on the Sunk Sand, in the North Sea off the coast of Essex with the loss of two of her crew. Survivors were rescued by a smack. She was on a voyage from Gothenburg, Sweden to London.
Earl of Spencer	United Kingdom	The schooner was wrecked 1 nautical mile (1.9 km) north of Drogheda, County Louth with the loss of two of her crew. She was on a voyage from Liverpool, Lancashire to Dublin
Edward	United Kingdom	The ship ran aground at Pwllheli, Caernarfonshire. She was on a voyage from Liverpool to Port Madoc, Caernarfonshire. She was refloated but found to be severely leaky.
Elizabeth	United Kingdom	The ship sank in the North Sea off Sutton-on-Sea, Lincolnshire. Her crew were rescued. She was on a voyage from Gothenburg, Sweden to London.
Elizabeth	United Kingdom	The ship sank at Brake, Kingdom of Hanover.
Frederick Wilhelm	Flag unknown	The ship was driven ashore in St Austell Bay. She was refloated on 19 November and towed in to Fowey, Cornwall in a severely damaged condition.
Gesina	Stralsund	The ship was driven ashore on Heligoland. Her crew were rescued. She was on a voyage from Stralsund to Amsterdam, North Holland, Netherlands.
Industrious	United Kingdom	The ship ran aground at Sulina.
Osbert	United Kingdom	The ship was driven ashore at Sheerness, Kent. She was on a voyage from London to Dominica. Osbert was later refloated and taken in to the River Thames.
Rio	France	The barque was abandoned in the Atlantic Ocean (48°02′N 15°30′W). Her crew were rescued by the brig Symmetry (United Kingdom). Rio was on a voyage from Gabon to Bordeaux, Gironde.
Suffolk	United Kingdom	The ship was abandoned in the Atlantic Ocean. Her crew were rescued by Thérese Rose (France). Suffolk was on a voyage from Miramichi, New Brunswick, British North America to Bristol, Gloucestershire.

== 18 November ==
List of shipwrecks: 18 November 1858
Ship	State	Description
Albion	United Kingdom	The brigantine was abandoned in the Atlantic Ocean 70 nautical miles (130 km) west by south of the Isles of Scilly. Her crew were rescued by the barque Euphrates (United Kingdom).
Bell	United Kingdom	The smack capsized off Looe, Cornwall. Her crew were rescued. She was on a voyage from Fowey, Cornwall to Plymouth, Devon. Bell was towed in to Plymouth the next day.
Eskeotan	Sweden	The ship was abandoned in the Atlantic Ocean 50 nautical miles (93 km) east south east of the Isles of Scilly. Her crew were rescued. She was on a voyage from Agrigento, Sicily to Dordrecht, South Holland, Netherlands.
Liffey	United Kingdom	The ship ran aground off Berbice, British Guiana. She was on a voyage from Barbados to Demerara, British Guiana.
Ozema	Sweden	The ship foundered in the Atlantic Ocean. Her crew were rescued by Jeune Charles (France). Ozemawas on a voyage from Port Talbot, Glamorgan, United Kingdom to Gothenburg.
Sea Venture	United Kingdom	The ship ran aground on the Tuzla Bank, in the Black Sea. She was on a voyage from Liverpool, Lancashire to Taganrog, Russia. She had been refloated by 23 November.

== 19 November ==
List of shipwrecks: 19 November 1858
Ship	State	Description
Cruiser	United Kingdom	The barque foundered off Point Elema, Spain. Her crew were rescued. She was on a voyage from Cardiff, Glamorgan to Civitavecchia, Papal States.
Gem of the Ocean	United Kingdom	The ship was driven ashore 3 leagues (9 nautical miles (17 km) east of Almería, Spain. Her crew were rescued. She was on a voyage from Swansea, Glamorgan to Valencia, Spain. Gem of the Ocean was refloated on 24 November and taken in to Almería.
Holyrood	United Kingdom	The ship was damaged by fire at New Orleans, Louisiana.
Olive	United Kingdom	The sloop was wrecked on the Sow and Pigs Rocks, on the coast of Northumberland. She was on a voyage from Leith, Lothian to Newcastle upon Tyne, Northumberland.
Quebec	United Kingdom	The ship ran aground in the Saint Lawrence River at St. Thomas, Province of Canada, British North America. She was on a voyage from Quebec City, Province of Canada to Liverpool, Lancashire. She was refloated and resumed her voyage.
South Pictou	United Kingdom	The brig was discovered derelict in the Atlantic Ocean 50 nautical miles (93 km) west south west of the Isles of Scilly by the barque Euphrates (United Kingdom). She was towed in to Queenstown, County Cork.
Thomas Watson	United Kingdom	The ship was driven ashore at Galveston, Texas, United States. She was on a voyage from Galveston to Liverpool. She was refloated, and subsequently sailed on 27 November.

== 20 November ==
List of shipwrecks: 20 November 1858
Ship	State	Description
Arab	United Kingdom	The ship ran aground at Wilmington, Delaware. She was on a voyage from Liverpool, Lancashire to Saint Thomas, Virgin Islands and Wilmington.
Betsey	United Kingdom	The brig was driven ashore at Wells-next-the-Sea, Norfolk. She was on a voyage from Blyth, Northumberland to Boulogne, Pas-de-Calais, France. She was refloated and taken in to Wells-next-the-Sea for repairs.
Chieftain	United Kingdom	The ship was abandoned in the Atlantic Ocean. Her crew were rescued by Benlomond (United Kingdom). Chieftain was on a voyage from Quebec City, Province of Canada, British North America to Grimsby, Lincolnshire.
Eva	United Kingdom	The brig was wrecked on Læsø, Denmark. She was on a voyage from Saint Petersburg, Russia to London.
Ida	United Kingdom	The brigantine was driven ashore at Wells-next-the-Sea. She was on a voyage from Hartlepool, County Durham to London. She was refloated the next day with the aid of a steamship and taken in to Wells-next-the-Sea.
James Turcan	United Kingdom	The barque was driven ashore and damaged at Columbo, Ceylon.
Old England	United Kingdom	The barque was wrecked 16 nautical miles (30 km) south of Cape Spartel, Morocco. She was on a voyage from Newcastle upon Tyne, Northumberland to Bastia, Corsica, France.
Sovereign	United Kingdom	The ship ran aground at Maranhão, Brazil.
Stephanie	France	The brig was wrecked at the Congio Lighthouse, Lisbon, Portugal. Her crew were rescued. She was on a voyage from London, United Kingdom to Marseille, Bouches-du-Rhône.

== 21 November ==
List of shipwrecks: 21 November 1858
Ship	State	Description
Doncaster	United Kingdom	The brig was driven ashore and severely damaged north of Black Head, County Antrim. She was on a voyage from Onega, Russia to Newport, Monmouthshire. She was refloated the next day and towed in to Belfast, County Antrim.
Eclipse	United Kingdom	The ship was wrecked near Bordeaux, Gironde, France. Her crew were rescued. She was on a voyage from Cardiff, Glamorgan to Bordeaux.
Juno	Netherlands	The galiot was severely damaged by an explosion in her cargo of coal at Hartlepool, County Durham, United Kingdom.
Maria	Norway	The schooner was damaged by an explosion in her cargo of coal at Hartlepool.
Vision	United Kingdom	The full-rigged ship was abandoned off Cape Horn, Chile. All on board were rescued by the full-rigged ship Steinwarder (Hamburg).

== 22 November ==
List of shipwrecks: 22 November 1858
Ship	State	Description
Clara	Austrian Empire	The brig was in collision with Victor Emmanuel (Flag unknown) and sank in the Mediterranean Sea.
Good Hope	United Kingdom	The sloop struck rocks and sank off Milford Haven, Pembrokeshire with the loss of her captain. She was on a voyage from Cardigan to Milford Haven.
Luisa	Norway	The barque was abandoned in the Mediterranean Sea. Her crew were rescued by Maria Teresa (Spain).
Neue Hoffnung	Lübeck	The ship was driven ashore at Riga, Russia. She was on a voyage from Lübeck to Riga.
Unity	Russia	The tug sank in the Daugava.

== 23 November ==
List of shipwrecks: 23 November 1858
Ship	State	Description
Flying Fish	United States	The extreme clipper was driven ashore at the mouth of the Min River. She was on a voyage from Foo Chow Foo, China to New York. She was refloated on 25 November. Although condemned, she was sold, repaired and returned to service as the Spanish ship El Bueno Suceso.
Great Northern	United Kingdom	The collier, a steamship was driven ashore at Sunderland, County Durham. Her crew were rescued. She was refloated on 19 December and taken in to Sunderland.
Maria Whitfield	United Kingdom	The ship foundered in the Atlantic Ocean off the Isles of Scilly. Her crew were rescued. She was on a voyage from Cardiff, Glamorgan to Southampton, Hampshire.
Nancy	United Kingdom	The schooner ran aground on the Goodwin Sands, Kent. She was refloated and resumed her voyage.
Navigateur	France	The ship was wrecked at Marseille, Bouches-du-Rhône.
Robert Henderson	United Kingdom	The ship ran aground in the Min River. She was on a voyage from Foo Chow Foo to New York.
Swallow	United Kingdom	The ship ran aground at South Shields, County Durham. She was on a voyage from South Shields to Chatham, Kent. She was refloated and resumed her voyage in a leaky condition, but consequently put in to Great Yarmouth, Norfolk to take on two extra hands.

== 24 November ==
List of shipwrecks: 24 November 1858
Ship	State	Description
Alert	United Kingdom	The sloop sprang a leak and sank in the North Sea. Her crew were rescued by United ( (United Kingdom of Great Britain and Ireland) Jersey). Albert was on a voyage from Boston, Lincolnshire to Sunderland, County Durham.
Calliope	United Kingdom	The brig was crushed between the barque Phœnix (Bremen and HMS Renown (Royal Navy) at Queenstown, County Cork and was severely damaged.
Jeannethe	Denmark	The brig was driven ashore at Bolderāja, Russia.
Northumberland	United Kingdom	The ship ran aground on the China Bakeer Sands, in the Indian Ocean. She was refloated on 4 December and taken in to Moulmein, Burma in a severely hogged condition.
Orator	United Kingdom	The barque foundered 6 nautical miles (11 km) south of the Old Head of Kinsale, County Cork. Her crew were rescued. She was on a voyage from Newport, Monmouthshire to Málaga, Spain.
St. Clair	United Kingdom	The schooner ran aground on the Herd Sand, in the North Sea off the coast of County Durham. She was on a voyage from London to South Shields, County Durham. She was refloated with the assistance of two tugs.
Volusia	United Kingdom	The brig was wrecked at Seaham, County Durham. Her crew were rescued. She was on a voyage from London to Seaham.
William and Mary	United Kingdom	The brig was abandoned in the Atlantic Ocean. Her crew were rescued by Speedwell (United Kingdom). William and Mary was on a voyage from Mauritius to London. She was subsequently discovered by the barque Marathon (United Kingdom) and taken in to Queenstown, County Cork

== 25 November ==
List of shipwrecks: 25 November 1858
Ship	State	Description
Beethoven	Norway	The full-rigged ship was abandoned in the Atlantic Ocean. Her crew were rescuedd by Juno (United Kingdom). Beethoven was on a voyage from Pugwash, Nova Scotia and/or Saint John, New Brunswick to London, United Kingdom.
Beulah Castle	United Kingdom	The ship was lost in Muros Bay. Her crew were rescued.
Minerva	United Kingdom	The schooner ran aground on the Pan Rocks, off the coast of Northumberland. Her crew were rescued. She was refloated on 4 December and taken in to Warkworth, Northumberland.
Nathaniel	United Kingdom	The ship ran aground on the Herd Sand, in the North Sea off the cost of County Durham. She floated off and came ashore at South Shields. Her crew were rescued. She was on a voyage from Brielle, South Holland, Netherlands to Newcastle upon Tyne, Northumberland.
Nautilus	United Kingdom	The ship sprang a leak and was beached at Middleton, County Durham, where she was wrecked. She was on a voyage from Blyth, Northumberland to Havre de Grâce, Seine-Inférieure, France.
Nestorian	United Kingdom	The ship struck the Arklow Banks, in the Irish Sea off the coast of County Wicklow with the loss of one of her 25 crew . She was on a voyage from Liverpool, Lancashire to Savannah, Georgia, United States. Nestorian was subsequently refloated and taken in tow for Liverpool. She capsized on 14 December and was driven ashore between Five Mile Point and Wicklow Head. She was righted with the assistance of two tugs.
Petrel	United Kingdom	The smack was driven ashore at Corry, Isle of Skye, Outer Hebrides. She was on a voyage from Scalloway, Shetland Islands to Liverpool. She was refloated and found to be severely leaky.
Protector	United Kingdom	The brig was run ashore and wrecked at Warkworth, Northumberland. Her crew were rescued. She was on a voyage from Warkworth to Bruges, West Flanders, Belgium. She was refloated on 8 December and taken in to Warkworth.
Thomas	United Kingdom	The brig was driven ashore at San Felipe, Spain. She was refloated on 10 December.

== 26 November ==
List of shipwrecks: 26 November 1858
Ship	State	Description
Elizabeth Moore	United Kingdom	The ship was abandoned in the Atlantic Ocean. Her crew were rescued by Henry Duncan (United Kingdom). Elizabeth Moore was on a voyage from Saint John, New Brunswick, British North America to Yarmouth, Isle of Wight. She came ashore at Alstadhaug, Norway on 23 April 1859 and was wrecked.
Maria	United Kingdom	The sloop ran aground on the Skagen Reef, in the Baltic Sea and sank. Her crew were rescued by Hermann Albert ( Stettin). Maria was on a voyage from Gothenburg, Sweden to Hull, Yorkshire.
Mead	United Kingdom	The brig ran aground at Blyth, Northumberland. She was on a voyage from London to Blyth.
Probe	Russia	The schooner was wrecked on the coast of Livonia. She was on a voyage from Riga to Helsingør, Denmark.
Protector	United Kingdom	The ship sprang a leak and was beached at Amble, Northumberland, where she was wrecked. Her crew were rescued. She was on a voyage from Amble to Bruges, West Flanders, Belgium.
Symmetry	United Kingdom	The brig was driven ashore at Sandsend, Yorkshire. She was on a voyage from Sunderland, County Durham to Lowestoft. She broke up a few days later.
Unnamed	United Kingdom	The smack was wrecked at Castletown, Isle of Man. Her four crew were rescued by the Castletown Lifeboat.

== 27 November ==
List of shipwrecks: 27 November 1858
Ship	State	Description
Fanny Louise	France	The barque was abandoned off the coast of Spain. Her crew were rescued by Justitia (Hamburg). Fanny Louise was on a voyage from Constantinople, Ottoman Empire to Brest, Finistère.
John	United Kingdom	The ship was driven ashore near "Prestoe", Russia. She was on a voyage from Saint Petersburg, Russia to London. She had been refloated by 1 December and resumed her voyage.
Sea Gull	United Kingdom	The steamship ran aground on the Maasdroogte, off the coast of Zeeland, Netherlands.
Waterwitch	United Kingdom	The schooner was abandoned in the Atlantic Ocean off Madeira. Her crew survived.
Wohlfart	Flag unknown	The ship was driven ashore near "Kuhno", Russia. Her crew were rescued. She had become a wreck by 1 December.

== 28 November ==
List of shipwrecks: 28 November 1858
Ship	State	Description
Lady Duffus	United Kingdom	The ship was driven ashore. She was on a voyage from London to a Swedish port. She was refloated and found to be severely leaky.
Laplace	French Navy	The Phlégéton-class corvette ran aground in the Chusan Islands. She was refloated with assistance from HMS Inflexible (Royal Navy) and towed in to Shanghai, China.
Roberts	United Kingdom	The ship foundered in the North Sea. Her crew were rescued by Orb (United Kingdom). Roberts was on a voyage from Svendborg, Denmark to Hull, Yorkshire.

== 29 November ==
List of shipwrecks: 29 November 1858
Ship	State	Description
Corinthian	United Kingdom	The ship ran aground on the West Hoyle Bank, in Liverpool Bay. She was on a voyage from Rio de Janeiro, Brazil to Liverpool, Lancashire. She was refloated and taken in to Liverpool in a leaky condition.
Fourleaver	United Kingdom	The ship was destroyed by fire in the South Atlantic.
Gentilhomme	France	The ship was collided with Mazeppa (United States) and sank in the Atlantic Ocean. Her crew were rescued. She was on a voyage from Brăila, Ottoman Empire to Antwerp, Belgium.
Hortensia	Stettin	The brig was driven ashore near Nexø, Denmark. Her crew survived. She was on a voyage from Kronstadt, Russia to Leith, Lothian, United Kingdom.
Meroo	United Kingdom	The ship was destroyed by fire in the Atlantic Ocean. She was on a voyage from Calcutta, India to London.
Witte Cornelio de Witte	Netherlands	The ship was wrecked on the Banjaard Sand, in the North Sea off the coast of Zeeland. She was on a voyage from Java, Netherlands East Indies to a Dutch port.

== 30 November ==
List of shipwrecks: 30 November 1858
Ship	State	Description
Ann Harley	United Kingdom	The full-rigged ship was wrecked near the Loggerhead Lighthouse, in the Dry Tortugas. She was on a voyage from Pensacola, Florida, United States to Hull, Yorkshire.
Cherie	France	The ketch was driven ashore and wrecked at Trevose Head, Cornwall, United Kingdom. Her crew were rescued. She was on a voyage from Cardiff, Glamorgan, United Kingdom to Havre de Grâce, Seine-Inférieure, France.
George Jordan	United Kingdom	The schooner foundered in the Irish Sea off Holyhead, Anglesey. Her crew were rescued by a Dutch vessel. She was on a voyage from Arklow, County Wicklow to Fleetwood, Lancashire.
Migrator	United Kingdom	The barque was driven ashore at Foo Chow Foo, China.
Neva	Sweden	The ship was driven ashore at Hanstholm, Denmark. She was on a voyage from Vaasa to London, United Kingdom. She was refloated the next day and resumed her voyage.
Tintern	United Kingdom	The steamship was driven ashore and wrecked on Holy Isle in the Firth of Clyde. She was on a voyage from Belfast, County Antrim to Troon, Ayrshire.

== Unknown date ==
List of shipwrecks: Unknown date in November 1858
Ship	State	Description
Acorn	United Kingdom	The ship was wrecked on the Pratas Shoal, in the South China Sea.
Ahto	Prussia	The barque was driven ashore at the Carbonera Lighthouse, Spain.
Anna Maria	Russian Empire	The schooner foundered in the Atlantic Ocean. Her crew were rescued by Annegina (Portugal). Anne Maria was on a voyage from Cardiff, Glamorgan, United Kingdom to Helsingør, Denmark.
Anne Giena Bendex	Hamburg	The ship was lost whilst on a voyage from the River Tyne to Hamburg.
Arrow	United Kingdom	The brig was wrecked on the Pratas Shoal, in the South China Sea before 15 November.
Asphalon	United Kingdom	The barque ran aground on the Longsand, in the North Sea off the coast of Essex. She was refloated and assisted in to Harwich, Essex.
British Queen	United Kingdom	The ship was abandoned in the North Sea before 29 November. Her crew were rescued. She was on a voyage from South Shields, County Durham to London.
Carlshamn	Sweden	The steamship sank off Kronstadt, Russia.
Columbia	United Kingdom	The ship was abandoned in the Atlantic Ocean before 3 November. She was on a voyage from Quebec City, Province of Canada, British North America to Queenstown, County Cork. She was discovered on that date and set afire.
Cornelia Lawrence	United States	The ship was destroyed by fire in Mobile Bay.
Cuba	United Kingdom	The steamship foundered off Land's End, Cornwall. Her 28 crew took to two boats; twelve of them were rescued by the schooner Annie Grant (United Kingdom). No further trace of the second boat Cuba was on a voyage from Wexford to Cardiff and London.
Dorothea	Norway	The barque was in collision with another vessel and was abandoned in the Atlantic Ocean 80 nautical miles (150 km) west of the Isles of Scilly on or before 18 November. Her crew were rescued by Ardbeg (United Kingdom).
Egent	Sweden	The schooner ran aground on the Shipwash Sand, in the North Sea off the coast of Suffolk, United Kingdom. She was refloated and assisted in to Harwich.
Emmeline	United Kingdom	The ship was driven ashore on the Swedish coast.
Etoile de la Mer	France	The brig foundered in the North Sea with the loss of three of her crew. Survivors were rescued by Jan Bos (Netherlands). Etoile de la Mer was on a voyage from Arkhangelsk, Russia to Antwerp, Belgium.
Familie	Grand Duchy of Oldenburg	The koff was wrecked at Höganäs, Sweden. She was on a voyage from Stockholm, Sweden to London.
Firefly	United Kingdom	The barque was abandoned in the Atlantic Ocean before 23 November. Her crew were rescued by Eagle (United Kingdom). Firefly was on a voyage from Newport, Monmouthshire to Valencia, Spain.
Friends	United Kingdom	The ship was lost on the Middelbank, in the North Sea off the Dutch coast before 8 November. She was on a voyage from Sunderland, County Durham to Schiedam, South Holland, Netherlands.
Fulton City	United Kingdom	The steamship struck a submerged object and sank in the Ohio River at Buffington Island, West Virginia before 18 November with the loss of twelve lives. She was on a voyage from Pittsburgh, Pennsylvania to Saint Louis, Missouri.
Garden	United Kingdom	The ship was abandoned in the Atlantic Ocean with the loss of two of her crew before 18 November. Survivors were rescued by the barque Sarah Ann (United States).
General Havelock	United Kingdom	The ship struck the Tendera, in the Black Sea and foundered.
Genova	Flag unknown	The full-rigged ship was driven ashore and damaged on Hiiumaa, Russia before 12 November. She was refloated and taken in to Copenhagen, Denmark for repairs.
George Canning	United Kingdom	The barque was driven ashore at Bjørnør, Norway. Her crew were rescued. she was on a voyage from Onega, Russia to Cardiff. She was refloated and taken in to "Kirau".
Guilelmo III	flag unknown	The steamship sank at Cádiz, Spain before 13 November.
Hazard	France	The lugger was abandoned in the English Channel. Her crew were rescued by Ceres (France). Hazard was on a voyage from Brest, Finistère to Abbeville, Somme.
Hebe	United Kingdom	The ship was abandoned at sea before 26 November. Her crew were rescued by the transport ship Northfleet (United Kingdom). Hebe was on a voyage from Alexandria, Egypt to London.
Hibernia	United Kingdom	The brig was wrecked on Barbuda before 4 November. She was on a voyage from New York to Saint Thomas, Virgin Islands.
Hopewell	United Kingdom	The smack was abandoned at sea. Two crew were rescued by Emigrant (United Kingdom). Hopewell was on a voyage from Bridgwater, Somerset to Port Madoc, Caernarfonshire.
Horizon	United Kingdom	The ship was abandoned in the Atlantic Ocean before 29 November. Her crew were rescued by Lady Peel (United Kingdom).
Imperatrice de Brasil	Brazil	The ship ran aground on the Rocas Shoal. She floated off and sank with the loss of eight of her crew. She was on a voyage from Rio de Janeiro to Havre de Grâce, Seine-Inférieure, France.
Jane	United Kingdom	The ship sank on the Linder Bank, in the North Sea off the Dutch coast. Her crew were rescued by a pilot boat. She was on a voyage from Middlesbrough, Yorkshire to Dordrecht, South Holland.
Jane Black	United Kingdom	The ship was abandoned at sea before 23 November.
La Française	France	The ship was driven ashore and wrecked in Ballinskelly's Bay. She was on a voyage from Málaga, Spain to Dunkirk, Nord
Langport	United Kingdom	The sloop was abandoned 80 nautical miles (150 km) off The Lizard, Cornwall before 16 November. Her crew were rescued by the brig Newbottle (United Kingdom).
Laura	United Kingdom	The snow ran aground in the River Plate before 2 November. She was on a voyage from Buenos Aires, Argentina to a European port. She was refloated and put back to Buenos Aires.
Linda	United Kingdom	The barque was driven ashore on Gotland, Sweden. She was refloated and taken in to Stockholm, Sweden for repairs.
Lord Hardinge	United Kingdom	The ship was driven ashore at "Fahlsund", Gotland before 22 November. She was refloated and taken in to Slitohamn, Gotland.
Margaretha Elizabeth	United Kingdom	The schooner ran aground on the Longsand. She was refloated and assisted in to Harwich.
Mary	United Kingdom	The ship was lost whilst on a voyage from Belize City, British Honduras to New Orleans, Louisiana, United States.
Medemblik	United Kingdom	The smack was wrecked at Sanlúcar de Barrameda, Spain with the loss of all but one of her crew. She was on a voyage from Cardiff, Glamorgan to Cádiz.
Minna	Lübeck	The brig departed from Kronstadt, Russia for Lübeck. No further trace, presumed foundered in the Baltic Sea with the loss of all hands.
Musser	United Kingdom	The full-rigged ship was abandoned in the Indian Ocean before 13 November. Her crew were rescued.
Orwell	United Kingdom	The brig was abandoned in the Atlantic Ocean before 24 November and was presumed to have foundered on that date.
Pamela	United Kingdom	The ship was driven ashore on "Cantate Island", in the Sea of Marmara before 17 November. Her crew were rescued.
Pearl	United Kingdom	The brig foundered in the Atlantic Ocean 300 to 400 nautical miles (560 to 740 km) west of Ireland. Her crew were rescued by John S. Iver ( (United Kingdom of Great Britain and Ireland) British North America).
Petrel	United Kingdom	The ship was abandoned in the Atlantic Ocean before 29 November.
Phase	France	The steamship was driven ashore at Bonifacio, Corsica. She was later refloated and towed in to Marseille, Bouches-du-Rhône.
Rankin	United States	The full-rigged ship was abandoned in the Atlantic Ocean before 6 November. Her crew were rescued. She was on a voyage from London to Quebec City.
Rosendale	United Kingdom	The full-rigged ship was abandoned in the Atlantic Ocean before 18 November. Her crew were rescued by Priscilla (United Kingdom). Rosendale was on a voyage from Quebec City to Hartlepool, County Durham.
Skatan	Sweden	The barque was abandoned in the Atlantic Ocean before 20 November.
St. Petersburg	United States	The ship was abandoned. Her crew were rescued by Antigua (United Kingdom). St. Petersburg was on a voyage from Glasgow, Renfrewshire, United Kingdom to Bombay, India.
Theophile	France	The ship was wrecked near Cádiz, Spain with the loss of eight lives.
Thomas Beghby	United Kingdom	The ship struck the Tendera, in the Black Sea and foundered.
Thorndale	United Kingdom	The ship was driven ashore on Gotland before 22 November. She was refloated and taken in to Slitohamn.
Three Sisters	United States	The schooner lost in the Bay of St. Lawrence. Crew saved.
United Kingdom	United Kingdom	The full-rigged ship was abandoned in the Atlantic Ocean before 20 November. Her crew were rescued by the full-rigged ship Daniel Webster (United States). United Kingdom was on a voyage from Quebec City to Belfast, County Antrim.
Wilkinson	United States	The brig was abandoned in the Atlantic Ocean. Her crew were rescued.
William Broderick	United Kingdom	The ship was driven ashore at Riga.
William Metcalfe	United Kingdom	The barque was abandoned in the Atlantic Ocean. Her fifteen crew were rescued by the barque Malakoff (United Kingdom).
Williams	United Kingdom	The ship was abandoned in the Atlantic Ocean before 25 November.
Wingrave	United Kingdom	The ship was run down and sunk off Southwold, Suffolk with the loss of ten crew.
Woodpark	United Kingdom	The ship was run down and sunk in the River Thames.
