= Harple =

Harple is a surname. Notable people with the surname include:

- Daniel Harple (born 1959), American entrepreneur, investor, inventor, and engineer.
- Leanne Harple, American politician

== See also ==
- Harpley
