= Sääre Nature Reserve =

Protected area in Estonia

- Location within Estonia
- Location: Estonia
- Coordinates: 57°54′30″N 22°01′40″E
- Area: 551 ha (1,360 acres)
- Established: 1971 (2018)

Sääre Nature Reserve is a nature reserve which is located in Saare County, Estonia.

The area of the nature reserve is 551 ha (1,360 acres).

The protected area was founded in 1971 on a basis of Vesitükimaa ornithological conservation area. In 2018 the protected area was designated to the nature reserve.
