= Harpley =

Harpley may mean:

- Harpley, Worcestershire, a village in Worcestershire, England
- Harpley, Norfolk, a village in Norfolk, England
