= Great Bromley =

Village in Essex, England

Coordinates: 51.89540°N 1.02600°E

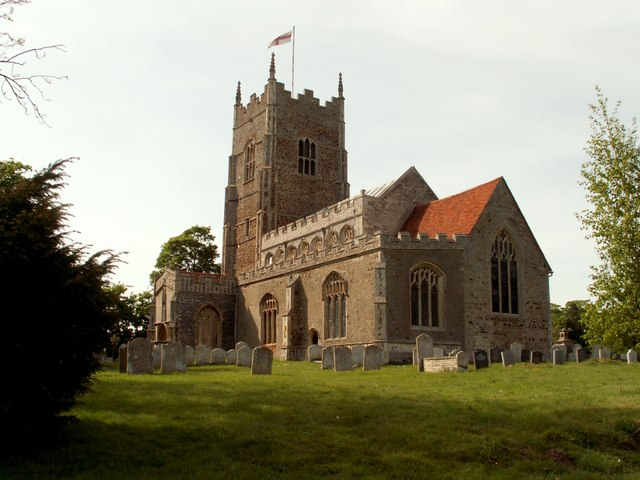
- St George's Church, Great Bromley

- Location within Essex
- Population: 1,108 (Parish, 2021)
- OS grid reference: TM083262
- District: Tendring
- Shire county: Essex
- Region: East
- Country: England
- Sovereign state: United Kingdom
- Post town: Colchester
- Postcode district: CO7
- Dialling code: 01206
- Police: Essex
- Fire: Essex
- Ambulance: East of England
- UK Parliament: Harwich and North Essex

Great Bromley is a village and civil parish in the Tendring district of Essex, England. It lies 6 kilometres (4 mi) south of Manningtree and 9 kilometres (6 mi) east of Colchester and includes the hamlets of Balls Green, Hare Green and Bromley Cross. The A120 trunk road (with the A133 as a spur off it) cuts right through the middle of the parish. At the 2021 census the parish had a population of 1,108.

== History ==
Ancient burial mounds have been found in and around Great Bromley.

The village church dates from the 14th and 15th centuries and is dedicated to Saint George but is sometimes referred to as the "Cathedral of the Tendring Hundred."

The village and the surrounding area, like much of East Anglia, had residents who were seething with Puritan sentiment during the early and middle years of the 17th century. By 1635, brothers Gregory and Simon Stone had departed for the Massachusetts Bay Colony as part of the wave of emigration that occurred during the Great Migration. They settled in Cambridge and Watertown, Massachusetts respectively.

During the interwar period, the Hall was the home of the wealthy brewer Sir Percy Crossman. Its grounds included a 500-yard-long lake, with two small islands and surrounded by woodland, which still exists and is used by a local angling club. Sir Percy built a Village Hall next to a cricket pitch in about 1923; in 1946 the building and associated land was conveyed as a gift to the village by his son, Douglas Peter Crossman.

The Church includes a monument to three sons from the Hanson family, owners of the Hall, one of whom died in battle in Catalonia fighting Napoleon's forces in Spain, one in the Navy, and one on a ship of the East India Company.

In the Second World War, Great Bromley Church suffered bomb damage on three occasions, to windows on the east and north sides.

Between 1936 and 1939, AMES 24, one of the earliest Chain Home radar stations, was built in the area of Honeypot Lane and Hilliards Road. By 1941 it consisted of 3 358-foot steel, 4 247-foot wooden, and 2 120-foot reserve wooden towers – locally known as "the Pylons". The station was operational from the 1938 Czech Crisis onwards, and operated right through the war, plotting German aircraft during the Battle of Britain and the Blitz, and later the V2 rockets. In 1941 and 1942 it was also the first "Gee" Bomber Command HQ and monitoring station, helping to guide the RAF to Lübeck and Cologne. The Great Bromley RAF staff reached over 250 at its peak, some staying at the Lodge and in a camouflaged "B Site" nearby localled called "Bromley Camp". AMES 24 was near-missed by German bombs and mines on several occasions, but was not hit. Between 1940 and 1942 the station was defended by up to 100 soldiers, 3 Bofors, and several machine guns. Two guardhouses and three concrete tower bases still be seen on the two main sites.

After the war, the old radar T (Transmitter) Site in Hilliards Road was used by Marconi for important radio and television tests, for Police, Fire Brigade and Civil Defence radio relay, and as a radio relay link between the US Air Force in England and Germany. A small party of American airmen lived locally in order to man the radio trailers. In 1982 CND staged two anti-nuclear demos at the USAF facility, without damage or arrests.

== Today ==
In 2006, the church of St. George received a £2,000 grant from the Friends of Essex Churches Trust to repair the building's windows.
