= Skye Marble Railway =

Former railway line in Scotland

Coordinates: 57.218°N 5.943°W

Overview
- Fleet: 1 Hunslet Engine Company steam locomotive
- Headquarters: Broadford, Skye
- Locale: Isle of Skye, Scotland
- Dates of operation: 1910–1912
- Successor: Abandoned

Technical
- Track gauge: 3 ft (914 mm)
- Length: 4 mi (6 km)

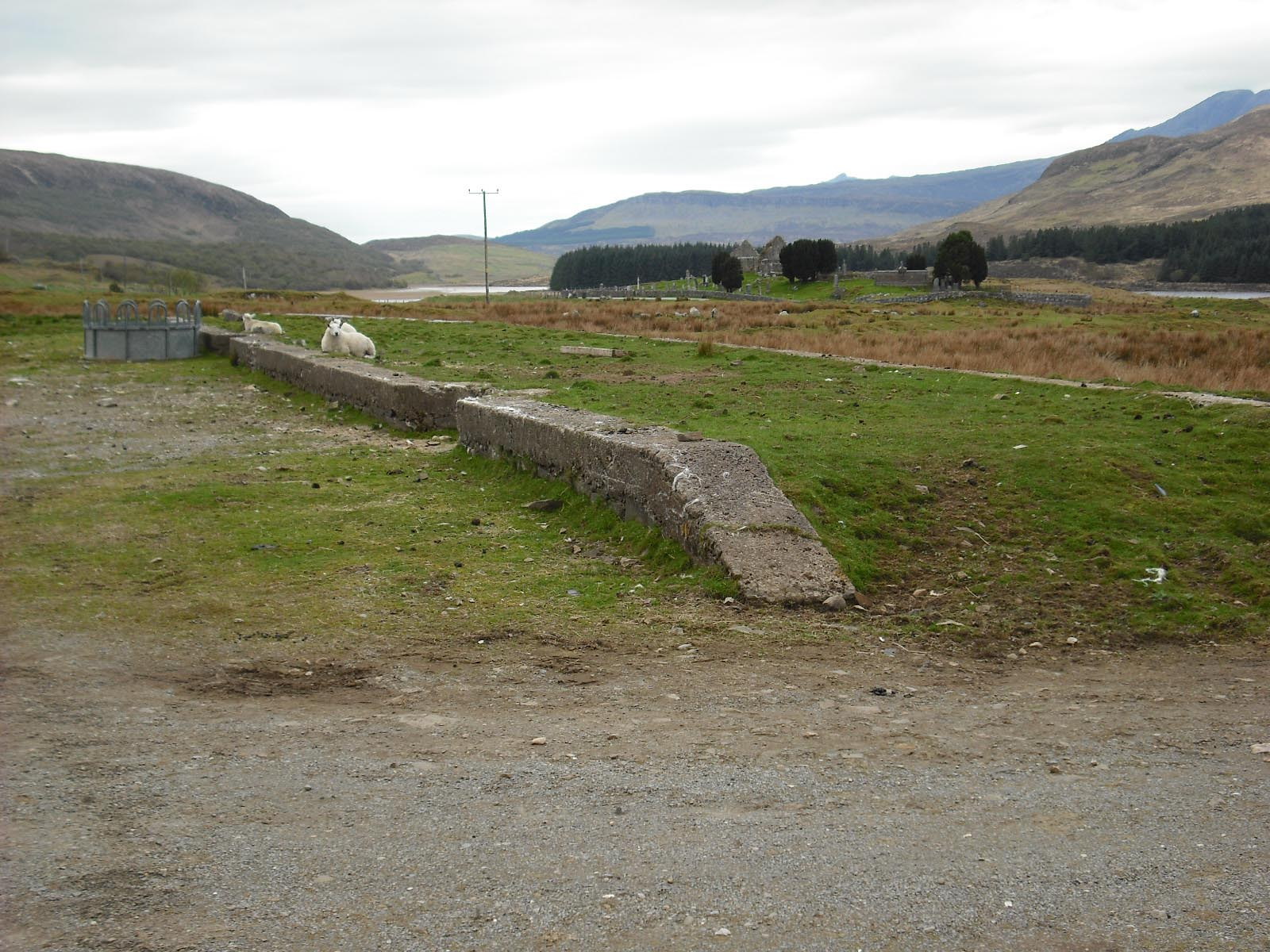
A former platform of the Skye Marble Railway

The Skye Marble Railway was a 3 ft (914 mm) narrow gauge industrial railway on the Isle of Skye, Scotland which operated from 1910 to 1912.

Marble was discovered near Kilchrist in Strath Suardal about 3 miles (5 kilometres) south west of Broadford around 1907. A large factory was built near the quarry for cutting and polishing the quarried blocks. In January 1910, the company put before the Skye District Committee plans for the railway including a level crossing in Broadford. The plans were accepted by the Committee with the provision that the company take responsibility for any accident which happened at the crossing. By August 1910, it was reported that the railway to the marble quarries was progressing well and expected to be completed within the anticipated timeframe.

The light railway extended 4 mi (6 km) from Broadford pier to the quarries, and there was a branch line to the factory. The blocks of marble were cut in workshops on the Island and shipped to Antwerp from the pier in Broadford. The railway was operated by a Hunslet Engine Company steam locomotive named Skylark, which was acquired second-hand from Ireland.

Shortly after completion in late October 1910, Lachian Macleod, a native of the Isle of Raasay, was employed by the company on a service train between Broadford and the quarry when a wagon got out of control on an incline. He leapt from the wagon and received a fracture of the skull which proved fatal.

The quarry railway was not successful for very long, and by 1913 the line was being offered for sale as part of the liquidation of the business. The sale comprised a 9½-in, 4-wheeled locomotive, 500 tons of 35 pounds (16 kg) and 56 pounds (25 kg) flat-bottomed rail and 9,000 6-foot creosoted sleepers.
