= Harpley Windmill =

Windmill in Harpley, Norfolk, England

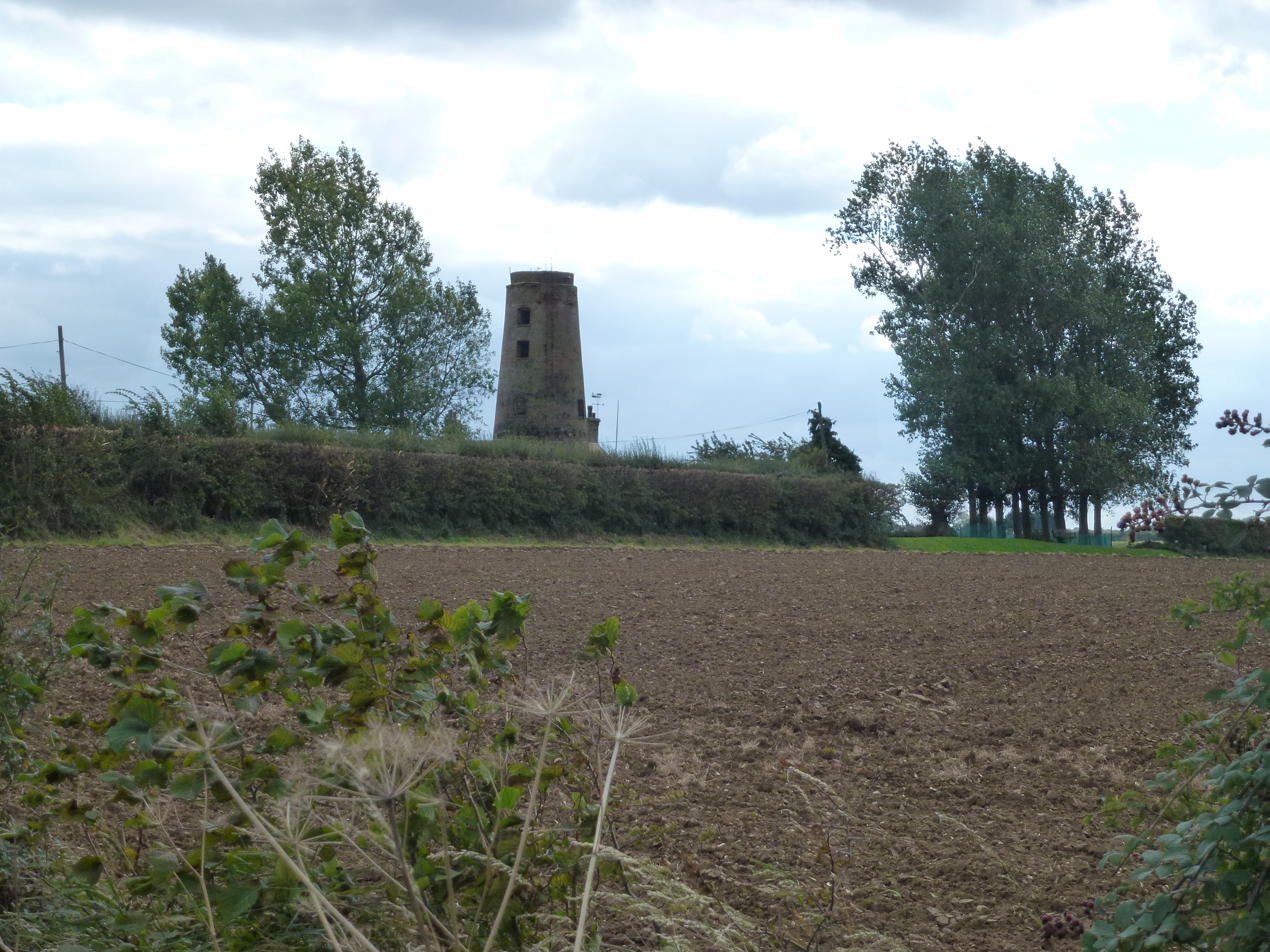
- Harpley Windmill, 2011
- Interactive map of Harpley Windmill

Origin
- Mill name: Harpley Windmill
- Mill location: Harpley, Norfolk, United Kingdom
- Grid reference: TF 7991 2532
- Coordinates: 52°47′48″N 0°40′01″E
- Year built: 1832

Information
- Purpose: Corn mill
- Type: Tower mill
- Storeys: Six storey tower
- No. of sails: Four
- Type of sails: Common sails, later Patent sails
- Windshaft: Cast iron
- Winding: Fantail
- Auxiliary power: Steam engine, later an oil engine
- No. of pairs of millstones: Three pairs
- Size of millstones: One pair 4 feet 0 inches (1.22 m) diameter, one pair 4 feet 6 inches (1.37 m) diameter
- Other information: Website

Harpley Windmill is a tower mill at Harpley, Norfolk, United Kingdom. It was built in 1832, replacing an earlier post mill. The mill worked by wind until 1921, and then by engine. Used as an observation post during World War II, it was converted to a holiday home in 2016. The mill is a Grade II listed building.

== History ==
The first mill on the site was a post mill. It was standing in 1790 when miller William Brooke made a will. Brooke died in 1792. He was followed by William Catton until 1803, then Edward Barber.

The post mill was replaced by a tower mill in 1832, evidenced by the windshaft bearing that date. Millers were William Norman (1836-43), followed by his son William (1843-83). A steam engine had been installed as auxiliary power by 1858. On 28 February 1860, the mill was severely damaged in a storm. William John Norman inherited the mill in 1883, working it until 1916. On 2 June 1889, the mill lost a sail in a thunderstorm. At this time, the mill was still being worked on Common sails. The last miller was Harry Howes. The mill was tailwinded in March 1921 and was thereafter worked by oil engine. By 1926, the mill had only two sails and the fantail was missing.

The mill had lost its cap and sails by 1937. It was used by the Home Guard during World War II. It was probably at this date that an external metal ladder was fitted to the mill. The mill was listed as Grade II on 13 April 1987. The tower was reduced in height by 3 feet (91 cm) in 2014. It was converted to a holiday home in 2016.

== Description ==
Harpley Windmill is a six storey tower mill, with a stage at the second floor level. It had an eight-sided ogee cap with a gallery and petticoat. Latterly, four double Patent sails were carried on a cast-iron windshaft, cast by King's Lynn ironfounder Aikman in 1832. The sails had eight bays. Seven of three shutters and the outermost bay having two. The sails rotated clockwise. The mill had a cast iron upright shaft.The 7 feet 6 inches (2.29 m) diameter great spur wheel drove three pairs of millstones, which were driven overdrift. One pair of French burr stones was 4 feet 0 inches (1.22 m) diameter, another was 4 feet 6 inches (1.37 m) diameter. The stone nuts were 18 inches (46 cm) diameter.
