= Hardy's Green =

Hamlet in Essex, England

Coordinates: 51.851°N 0.803°E

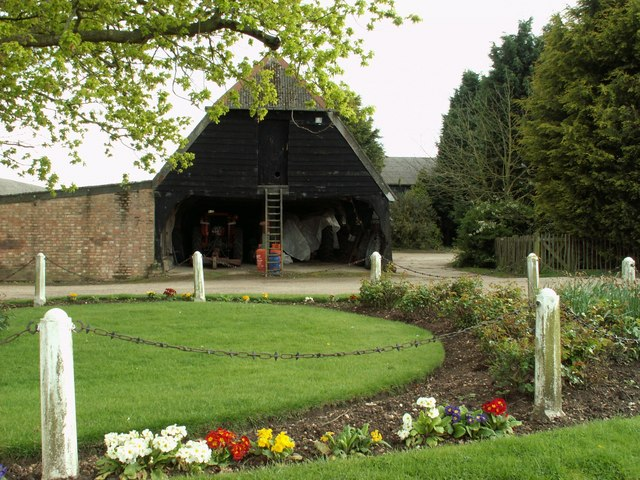
- Part of the farm at Beckingham Hall

- Location within Essex
- Civil parish: Birch
- District: Colchester
- Shire county: Essex
- Region: East
- Country: England
- Sovereign state: United Kingdom
- Police: Essex
- Fire: Essex
- Ambulance: East of England

Hardy's Green is a hamlet in civil parish of Birch in the Colchester district, in the county of Essex, England. Nearby settlements include the city of Colchester.
