= Hare Green =

Hamlet in Essex, England

Coordinates: 51.883°N 1.040°E

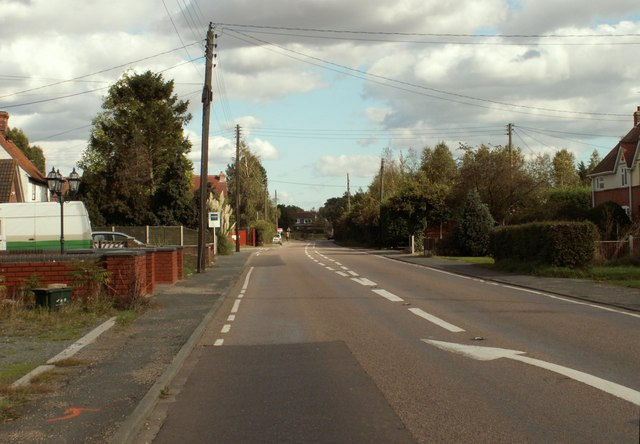
- Harwich Road

- Location within Essex
- Area: 0.237 km^{2} (0.092 sq mi)
- Population: 707 (2018 estimate)
  - Density: 2,983/km^{2} (7,730/sq mi)
- Civil parish: Great Bromley
- District: Tendring
- Shire county: Essex
- Region: East
- Country: England
- Sovereign state: United Kingdom

Hare Green is a hamlet in Harwich Road, in the Tendring district, in the English county of Essex. In 2018 it had an estimated population of 707. Hare Green is located within the civil parish of Great Bromley. There are several listed buildings including Hill House and Fleece House, both a Grade II listed 17th century properties.

== Transport ==
The A120 road and the A133 road are nearby, with the junction between the two roads is known as the Hare Green interchange. However there is no direct access to either road from Hare Green.
