= Hareshaw =

Village in North Lanarkshire, Scotland

Coordinates: 55°49′19″N 3°53′52″W

Hareshaw is a small village in North Lanarkshire, Scotland.
