= Pitkasääremaa =

Island in Estonia

Coordinates: 58°05′30″N 22°02′18″E

Pitkasääremaa is a small islet in the Baltic Sea belonging to the country of Estonia.

Pitkasääremaa is part of the Vesitükimaa islets, made up of several islets in Saaremaa Parish, Saare County in the southern part of the Sõrve Peninsula off the southeastern coast of the island of Saaremaa. The Vesitükimaa islets include Siiasaar, Lombimaa, Vesitükimaa islet and Pitkasääremaa. The area was placed under protection in 1971 as the Vesitükimaa Islets Sanctuary (Estonian: Vesitükimaa laidude kaitseala). The area of land of the sanctuary is made up of 10.8 hectares and the area of water in within the sanctuary has an area of 149.7 hectares (a total of 160.5 ha). Pitkasääremaa and the other islets in the sanctuary are an important breeding and nesting ground for waterfowl and migratory sea birds, as well as a breeding ground for grey seals (Halichoerus grypus). The area is off limits to visitors during the nesting season, from April 1 to July 1.

== See also ==
- List of islands of Estonia

== Sources ==
- Barrett, Michael B (2007). Operation Albion: the German conquest of the Baltic Islands. Indiana University Press. ISBN 978-0-253-34969-9.
