= Broadford, Skye =

Town on the Isle of Skye, Scotland

Coordinates: 57.241°N 5.907°W

Broadford: Scottish Gaelic: An t-Àth Leathann
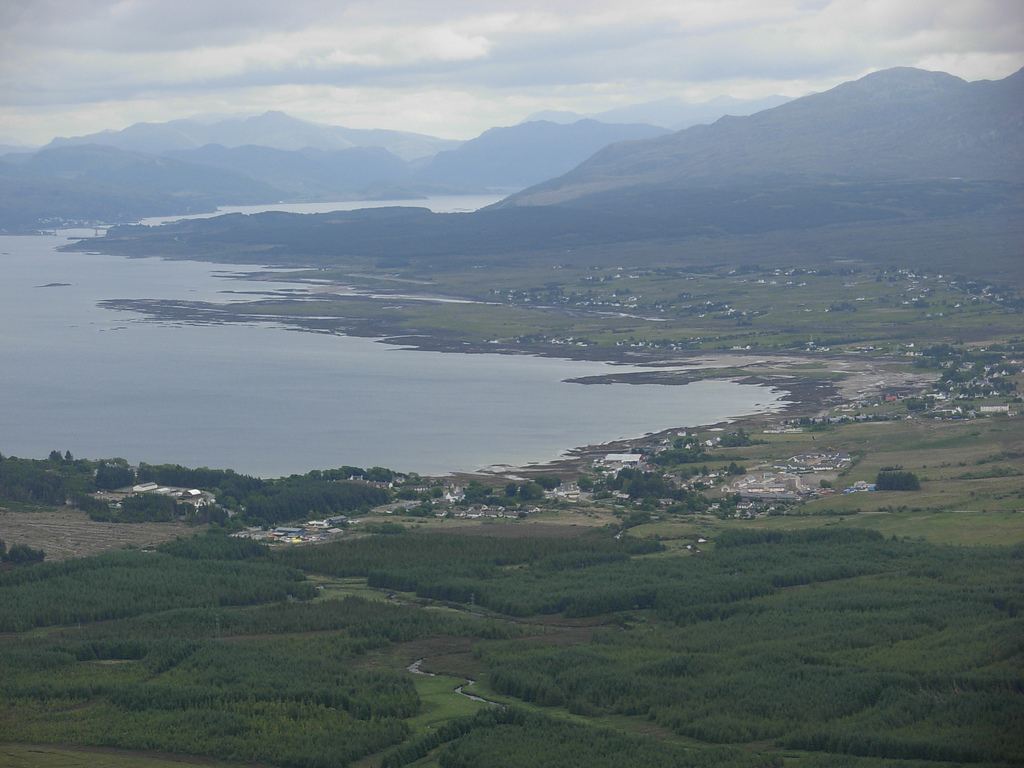
- Overlooking Broadford village

- Location within the Isle of Skye
- Population: 1,170 (2020)
- OS grid reference: NG642234
- Civil parish: Strath
- Council area: Highland
- Lieutenancy area: Ross and Cromarty
- Country: Scotland
- Sovereign state: United Kingdom
- Post town: ISLE OF SKYE
- Postcode district: IV49
- Dialling code: 01471
- Police: Scotland
- Fire: Scottish
- Ambulance: Scottish
- UK Parliament: Inverness, Skye and West Ross-shire
- Scottish Parliament: Skye, Lochaber and Badenoch

Broadford (Scottish Gaelic: An t-Àth Leathann [ən̪ˠ t̪aːh ˈʎɛhən̪ˠ]), together with nearby Harrapool, is the second-largest settlement on the Isle of Skye, Scotland. Lying in the shadow of the Red Cuillin mountains, Broadford is within the parish of Strath. A long meandering village historically consisting of a few buildings on either side of the Broadford River, the many small townships around the wide sweep of the bay have grown together and Broadford now stretches for 1 1/2 miles (2.4 kilometres) around the southern side of Broadford Bay.

== History ==
Like many places in Skye, Broadford derives its name from Old Norse. To the Vikings, this was Breiðafjorðr – the wide bay. The Gaelic name is of modern derivation and assumes that the "ford" element meant a river crossing.

West of Broadford in Glen Suardal, on the lower slopes of Beinn na Caillich, is Goir a' Bhlàir, 'the field of battle' (grid reference NG624234). The battle concerned was apparently a decisive action by the Gaelic Clan Mackinnon against the Norsemen.

From the late 1700s Broadford was a cattle market. In 1812, Thomas Telford built the road from Portree to Kyleakin. Veterans of the Napoleonic Wars settled during the first half of the 19th century, a legacy of which is a section of the village that is to this day named Waterloo. Writing in the middle of the 19th century, Alexander Smith said, "If Portree is the London of Skye, Broadford is its Manchester."

Legend holds that the recipe for Drambuie liqueur was given by Bonnie Prince Charlie to Clan MacKinnon who then passed it onto James Ross late 19th century. Ross ran the Broadford Inn (now the Broadford Hotel), where he developed and improved the recipe, initially for his friends and then later to patrons. Ross then began to sell it further afield and the name was registered as a trademark in 1893.

Throughout the 1800s, marble was extracted from a quarry at the foot of Beinn na Caillich (Hill of the Old Woman) and in 1904 the Skye Marble Railway was built to carry the marble to the new pier at Broadford. In December 1910 a steam locomotive named the Skylark was in use on the line until the work ceased in 1914.

The marble industry involved transporting the marble by hand to Loch Cill Chriosd, where it was dressed and polished using water power from a small dam, before being taken to the waiting ships at the old pier. Although there are significant early records of the much prized Skye marble, quarrying did not proceed on a commercial scale until more modern infrastructure was put in place, and the establishment of Skye Marble in 1907.

Martin Martin mentions the quarrying of marble near Torrin as early as 1698, and Thomas Pennant’s records of his Scottish tours of 1771–1775, state that the altar in Iona Abbey was made of Skye marble. The highly ornamental white marble was also used in Hamilton Palace and Armadale Castle.

== Sleat & Strath AFC ==
Broadford is home to a successful football club in the Skye and Lochalsh Football League known as 'Sleat and Strath', originally just known as Sleat.

== Geography ==
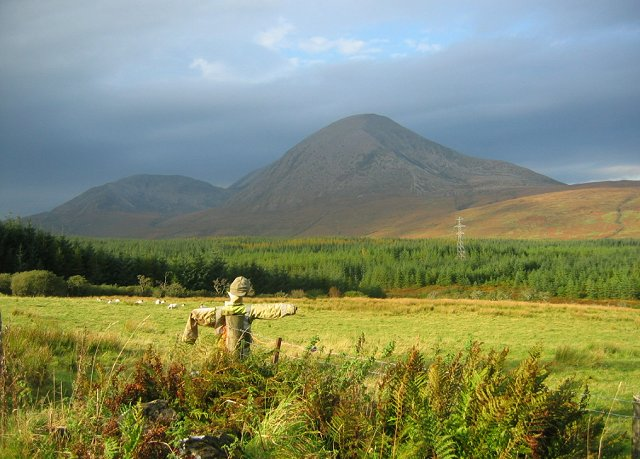
Beinn na Caillich and Goir a' Bhlàir from Broadford

Broadford lies on the south-west corner of Broadford Bay, on the A87 between Portree and the Skye Bridge. The settlement is overlooked by the Red Cuillin.

=== Geology ===
The mineral harkerite was first found near Broadford by the geologist Alfred Harker.

=== Wildlife ===
A variety of marine life can be seen in Broadford Bay including otters, seals and on very rare occasions orca whales.

Birds that can sometimes be spotted at the bay include the whooper swan, brent goose, red-throated diver and the black-tailed godwit.

=== Climate ===
Broadford has an oceanic climate (Köppen: Cfb). The climate here is extremely wet, with over 2,000 mm (79 in) of rainfall a year on average. The nearest weather station to Broadford is located at Lusa, around 4 mi (6 km) to the east.

Climate data for Lusa (18 m asl, averages 1981–2010)
Month	Jan	Feb	Mar	Apr	May	Jun	Jul	Aug	Sep	Oct	Nov	Dec	Year
Mean daily maximum °C (°F)	7.2 (45.0)	7.5 (45.5)	8.9 (48.0)	11.1 (52.0)	13.9 (57.0)	15.6 (60.1)	17.0 (62.6)	17.1 (62.8)	15.1 (59.2)	12.4 (54.3)	9.5 (49.1)	7.2 (45.0)	11.9 (53.4)
Mean daily minimum °C (°F)	2.1 (35.8)	2.0 (35.6)	2.9 (37.2)	4.0 (39.2)	6.3 (43.3)	8.9 (48.0)	10.8 (51.4)	10.8 (51.4)	9.1 (48.4)	6.7 (44.1)	4.3 (39.7)	2.2 (36.0)	5.8 (42.5)
Average rainfall mm (inches)	252.2 (9.93)	173.9 (6.85)	190.8 (7.51)	113.8 (4.48)	92.0 (3.62)	89.6 (3.53)	105.7 (4.16)	137.4 (5.41)	190.2 (7.49)	232.5 (9.15)	227.0 (8.94)	231.6 (9.12)	2,036.7 (80.19)
Average rainy days (≥ 1 mm)	20.7	17.5	20.6	15.3	12.8	13.3	16.3	17.9	17.8	20.5	20.5	20.3	213.5
Source: Met Office

== Economy ==
As well as being the home port to numerous fishing vessels, Broadford is also a key service centre for southern Skye. Services include the Co-op supermarket combined with a 24-hour Asda filling station, restaurants (including the Broadford Hotel, Harbour Restaurant, Claymore, Dunollie Hotel, Hebridean Hotel and Red Skye), and a youth hostel. The previous local hospital, the Mackinnon Memorial Hospital, was replaced with opening of the much larger Broadford Hospital in May 2022.

== Transport ==
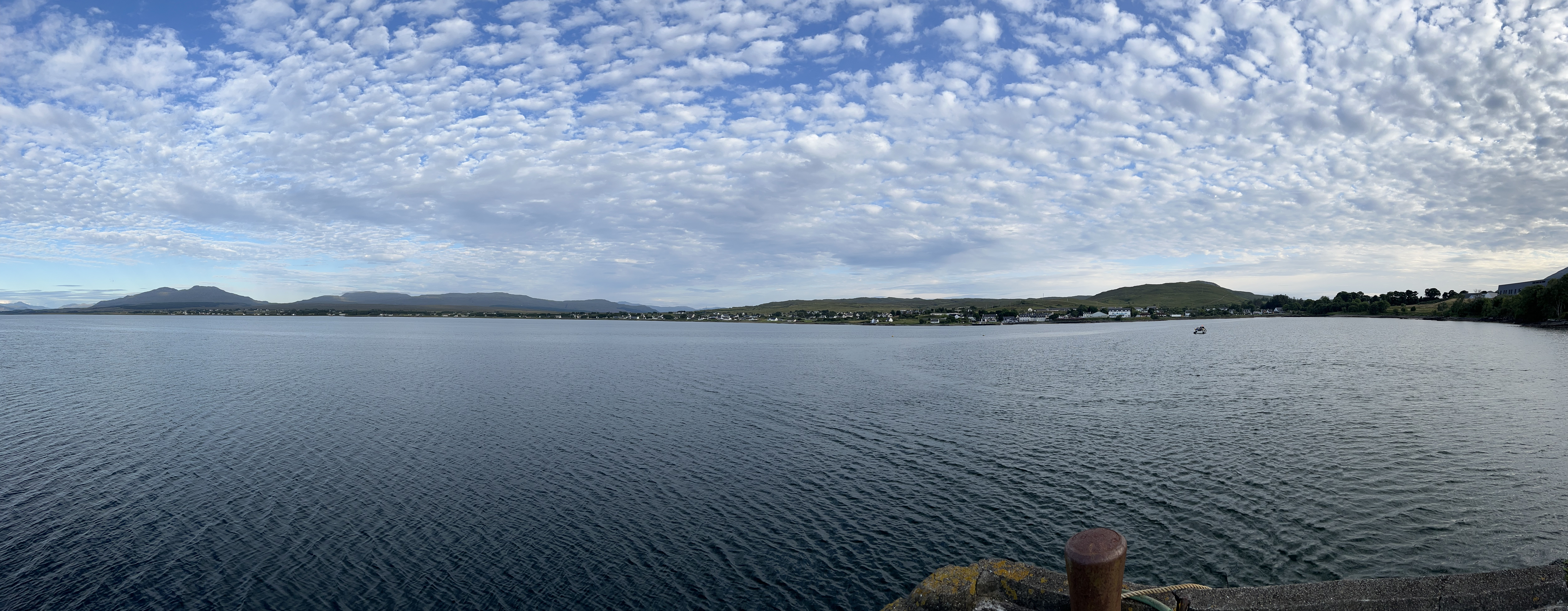
Panorama from Broadford pier

=== Road ===
The A87 travels through Broadford, on its route from Invergarry to Uig. The A851 begins at a junction with the A87, towards the east end of Broadford, and continues to Armadale. Meanwhile, the B8083 begins at a junction with the A87 at the western end of Broadford, and continues to Elgol. There is also a coastal road, (a left turn at Killbride) which can be found halfway along the B8083, this takes you down to a viewpoint at Loch Slapin. Public are able to catch either the 155 or 55 bus along this road.

=== Water ===
There are two piers within the vicinity of Broadford. One is at the east end of the village by the war memorial, the other and larger at Corry, at the north west end of the bay. It is common to see rainbows over Broadford bay, caused by the high moisture content of the air above it.

=== Air ===
Broadford Airfield (IATA: SKL; ICAO: EGEI) is located at nearby Ashaig. The single asphalt runway is 793 m (2,602 ft) in length and oriented at 07/25.

== In popular culture ==
- There is a song by the rock band Jethro Tull called "Broadford Bazaar" (on the remastered version of the Heavy Horses album) which is named after this town.
- There is also a song entitled 'The Trip to Broadford' on the 1990 album Room to Roam by The Waterboys.
- The opening sequence from the 1980 film Flash Gordon, was filmed at the Airstrip in the summer of 1978.
