= Vesitükimaa =

Island in Estonia

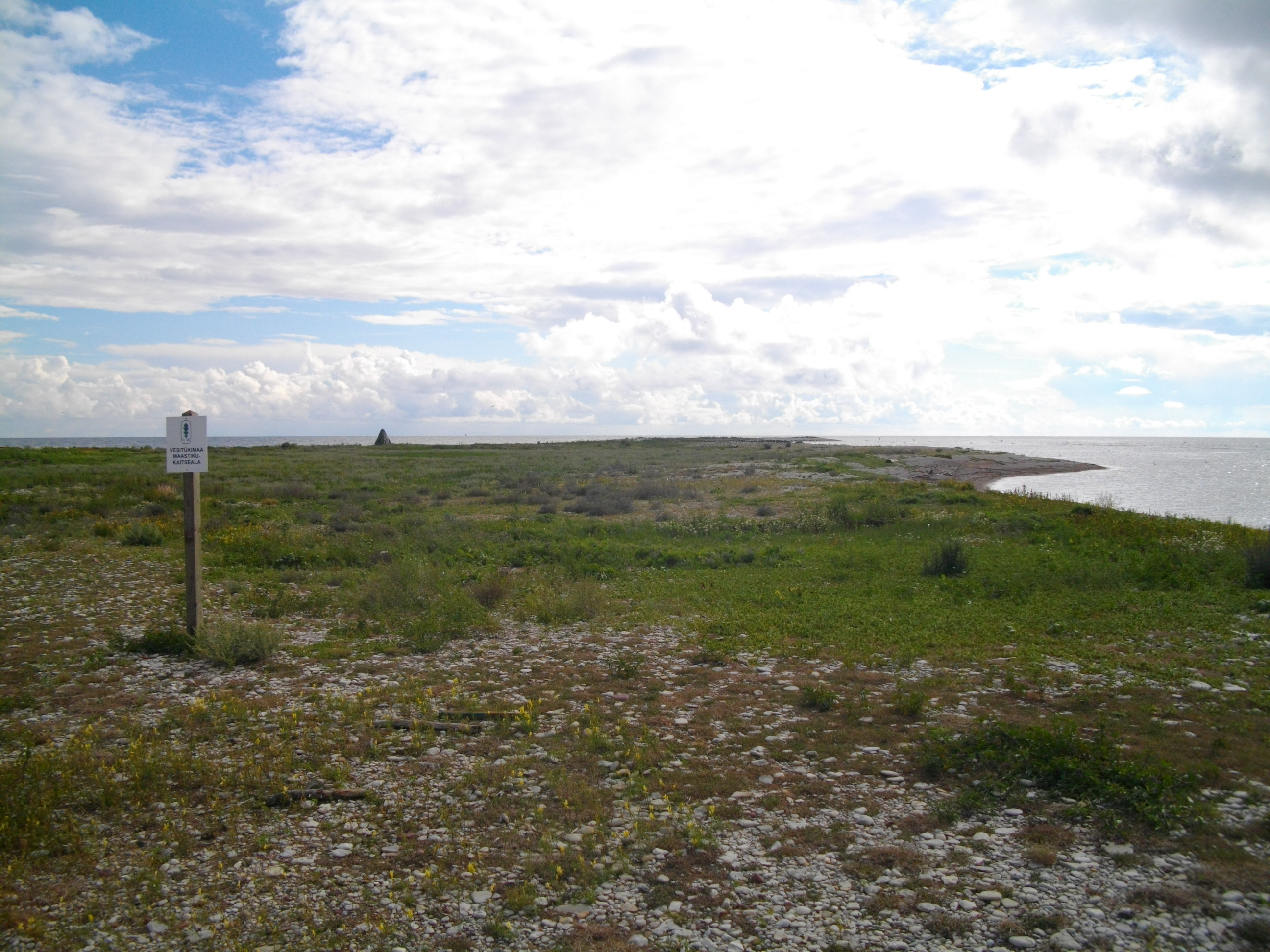
View from the northern tip of Vesitükimaa

Vesitükimaa (alternately: Vesitükk and Vesitüki. English: Piece of Waterland) is a small, uninhabited Estonian islet located in Saaremaa Parish, at the tip of Sõrve Peninsula of Saaremaa island. It is a site of European Community importance for the Boreal Biogeographical Region, its coordinates are 57°53′49″N 22°02′26″E and its territory is 12,6 km^{2}.

Vesitükimaa is among a group of small islets, including Siiasaar, Lombimaa and Pitkasääremaa that make up the Vesitükimaa Islets Sanctuary (Estonian: Vesitükimaa laidude kaitseala). The small island of Lombimaa lies 200 meters south of Vesitükimaa.

The reserve area covers 160.5 hectares, of which 10.8 hectares is land and 149.7 hectares sea. The closest village to Vesitükimaa is Tehumardi, located on the narrowest strip of Saaremaa – the neck of the Sõrve Peninsula.

Vesitükimaa islets and the tip of Sõrve Peninsula were placed under protection in 1971 because of its geological, botanical and ornithological importance. The Estonian Geological Institute has carried on long-term studies on many of the islets, including Vesitükimaa. The islets are also a favored nesting area for sea birds, especially for several species of sea gulls. Swans can be seen here as well as other birds. The area is off limits to visitors during the nesting season, from April 1 to July 1.

== See also ==
- List of islands of Estonia
