= Harrapool =

Coordinates: 57.24244°N 5.88989°W

Harrapool: Scottish Gaelic: Harrapul
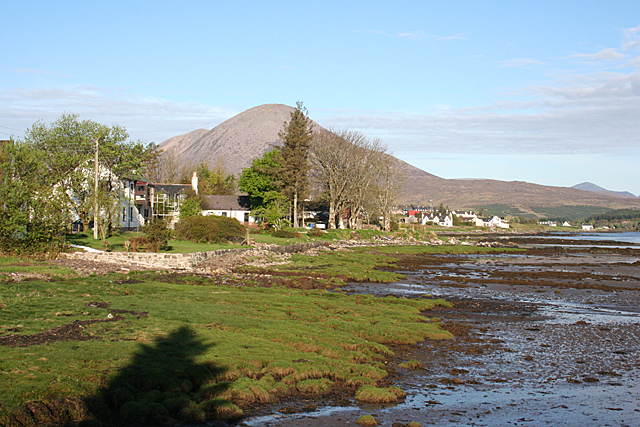
- Harrapool The outskirts of Broadford, with Beinn na Caillich, one of the Red Cuillins, in the background.

- Location within the Isle of Skye
- OS grid reference: ND313390
- Council area: Highland
- Country: Scotland
- Sovereign state: United Kingdom
- Post town: Broadford
- Postcode district: IV49 9
- Dialling code: 01471
- Police: Scotland
- Fire: Scottish
- Ambulance: Scottish

Harrapool (Scottish Gaelic: Harrapul or Harrabol) is a village on the southeast coast of the Isle of Skye, Scottish Highlands and is in the Scottish council area of Highland. It lies on the right-hand side of Broadford Bay, with the town of the bay to the east along the A87 road.

== Geography and Location ==
The scattered settlement of Harrapool is situated immediately east of Broadford.

== Climate ==
Harrapool has a mild climate for Scotland. Winters are typically mild with January temperatures averaging highs of 7.1 °C and lows of 1.9 °C. Summers are cool, with August temperatures reaching an average high of 17.1 °C and lows of 10.8 °C.

The area receives significant rainfall, with an annual average of 2,031 mm distributed over approximately 214 days per year. Precipitation tends to be heavier during winter months. Sunshine is relatively limited, with a total of about 1,194 hours recorded in a typical year.

== History and Administration ==
Historically, Harrapool was part of Inverness-shire and the parish of Strath. Today it falls under the Highland Council area.
