= Harrietfield =

Coordinates: 56.44°N 03.65°W

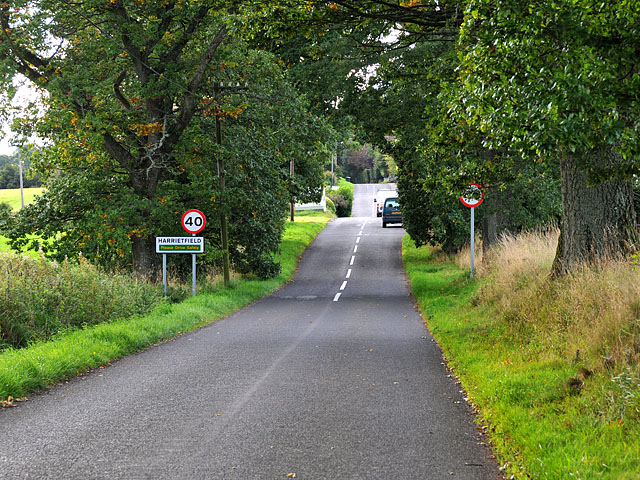

- Location within Perth and Kinross
- OS grid reference: NN9829
- Council area: Perth and Kinross
- Lieutenancy area: Perth and Kinross
- Country: Scotland
- Sovereign state: United Kingdom
- Post town: PERTH
- Postcode district: PH1
- Dialling code: 01738
- Police: Scotland
- Fire: Scottish
- Ambulance: Scottish
- UK Parliament: Ochil & South Perthshire
- Scottish Parliament: North Tayside; North East Scotland

Harrietfield is a village near Glenalmond in Perth and Kinross. It is about 9 miles (14 km) north-west of Perth. It has been suggested that the village was built in 1822 as a planned community for mill workers

== Amenities ==
The village is home to The Drumtochty Tavern, which is thought to be around 200 years old. The tavern is closed at present. There was also a Free Church of Scotland in the village until 1995, when it was closed.
