= Harpley, Worcestershire =

Hamlet in Worcestershire, England

Coordinates: 52.248114°N 2.465013°W

Harpley
- Location within Worcestershire
- District: Malvern Hills
- Shire county: Worcestershire
- Region: West Midlands
- Country: England
- Sovereign state: United Kingdom
- Post town: Worcester
- Postcode district: WR6
- Police: West Mercia
- Fire: Hereford and Worcester
- Ambulance: West Midlands

Harpley is a hamlet in Worcestershire, England.
