= Harpley, Norfolk =

Village in Norfolk, England

Coordinates: 52.80654°N 0.65468°E

Harpley
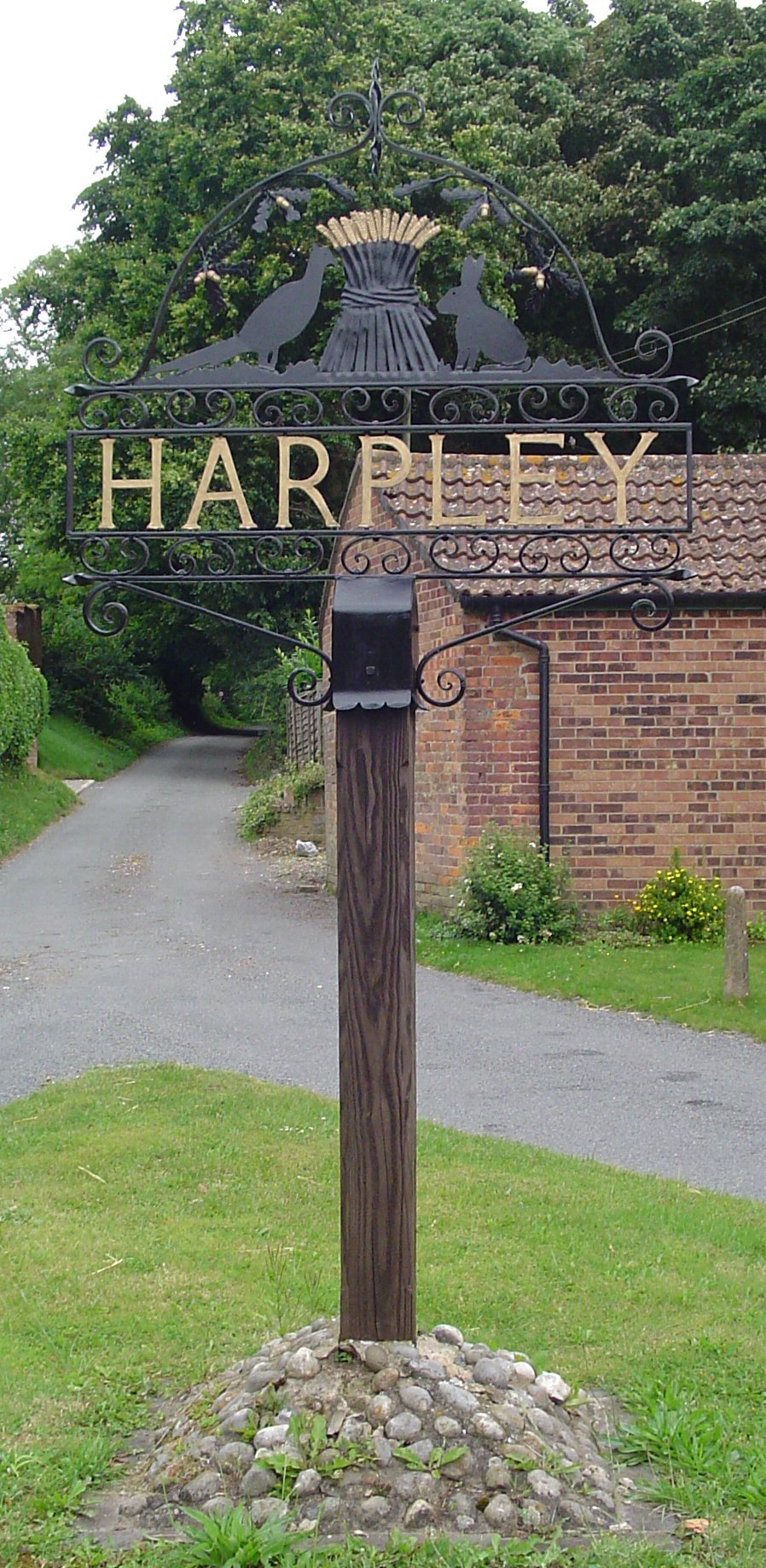
- Harpley Village Sign

- Location within Norfolk
- Area: 3.59 sq mi (9.3 km^{2})
- Population: 333 (2021 census)
  - Density: 93/sq mi (36/km^{2})
- OS grid reference: TF790265
- Civil parish: Harpley
- District: King's Lynn and West Norfolk
- Shire county: Norfolk
- Region: East
- Country: England
- Sovereign state: United Kingdom
- Post town: KING'S LYNN
- Postcode district: PE31
- Dialling code: 01485
- UK Parliament: North West Norfolk

Harpley is a village and civil parish in the English county of Norfolk, located along the A148.

Harpley is 12 miles (19 km) north-east of King's Lynn and 30 miles (48 km) north-west of Norwich.

== History ==
Harpley's name is of Anglo-Saxon origin and derives from the Old English for harp clearing with 'harp' referring to a sieve used in salt working.

There was once a neolithic barrow in Harpley which has mostly been lost to the plough. The Roman Peddars Way once passed through Harpley alongside the barrow.

In the Domesday Book, Harpley is recorded as a settlement of 43 households in the hundred of Freebridge. In 1086, the village was divided between the estates of Odo of Bayeux and William de Warenne.

== Geography ==
According to the 2021 census, Harpley has a population of 333 people which shows a decrease from the 338 people listed in the 2011 census.

The village is located along the A148, between King's Lynn and Cromer.

== St. Lawrence's Church ==
Harpley's parish church is dedicated to Saint Lawrence and dates from the Thirteenth Century. St. Lawrence's is located within the village on Church Lane and has been Grade I listed since 1960. The church no longer holds regular church services and is part of the GGM Benefice.

St. Lawrence's holds medieval carved statues of the four Doctors of the Church, medieval bench ends and medieval stained-glass depicting Saint Edward the Confessor.

== Amenities ==
Harpley Church of England Primary School is located on School Lane and is part of the Great Massingham & Harpley Schools Federation. The headteacher is H. Myhill.

The Rose & Crown Pub has stood in the village since at least 1789. Harpley Windmill was converted to a holiday home in 2016.

== Governance ==
Harpley is part of the electoral ward of Massingham with Castle Acre for local elections and is part of the district of King's Lynn and West Norfolk.

The village's national constituency is North West Norfolk which has been represented by the Conservative's James Wild MP since 2010.

== War Memorial ==
Harpley War Memorial is a marble obelisk inside St. Lawrence's Churchyard which was unveiled by John Bowers, Bishop of Thetford. The memorial lists the following names for the First World War:

Rank	Name	Unit	Date of death	Burial/Commemoration
Pte.	Ralph W. Porter MM	60th (Victoria Rifles) Bn., CEF	9 Oct. 1916	Vimy Memorial
Pte.	Herbert Arter	4th Bn., Canadian Military Engineers	25 Aug. 1916	Reningelst Cemetery
Pte.	William H. Fake	17th Bn., Royal Fusiliers	8 Jun. 1918	Bagneux Cemetery
Pte.	Ezra Seaman	1st Bn., Hertfordshire Regiment	18 Sep. 1918	Vis-en-Artois Memorial
Pte.	Bertram Stringer	12th Bn., Highland Light Infantry	29 Sep. 1918	Zantvoorde Cemetery
Pte.	Alfred T. Norman	21st Bn., Manchester Regiment	11 Oct. 1918	Beaurevoir Cemetery
Pte.	Stanley Steel	1st Bn., Norfolk Regiment	9 Oct. 1917	Tyne Cot
Pte.	Bertie W. Porter	5th Bn., Norfolk Regt.	19 Apr. 1917	Jerusalem Memorial
Pte.	Ernest Gagen	9th Bn., Norfolk Regt.	14 Sep. 1916	Wimereux Cemetery
Pte.	John E. Osborne	9th Bn., Norfolk Regt.	15 Sep. 1916	Thiepval Memorial

The following names were added after the Second World War:

Rank	Name	Unit	Date of death	Burial/Commemoration
WO	C. Edward Rasberry	2nd Bn., Royal Norfolk Regiment	27 May 1940	Dunkirk Town Cemetery
Sgt.	Ivor E. Laughlin	Royal Air Force Volunteer Reserve	27 Mar. 1944	Hotton War Cemetery
Sgt.	Harold F. Arter	Norfolk Yeomanry	11 Mar. 1940	Blargies Cemetery
LSgt.	Arthur C. Dolman	55 A.T. Regt., Royal Artillery	18 Jun. 1944	Hottot-les-Bagues Cemetery
Gnr.	Arthur A. Hammond	48 L.A.A. Regt., R.A.	21 Apr. 1945	Labuan War Cemetery
Pte.	Reginald C. Stringer	2nd Bn., Royal Norfolk Regiment	4 May 1944	Kohima War Cemetery
