= Holy Family Church =

Holy Family Church, or other variations on the name, may refer to:

== Africa ==
- Cathedral Basilica of the Holy Family, Nairobi, Kenya

== Asia ==
=== Palestine and Jerusalem ===
- Church of the Holy Family, Jerusalem
- Holy Family Church, Gaza, Palestine
- Holy Family Church, Ramallah, Palestine

=== Elsewhere in Asia ===
- Holy Family Syro-Malabar Church, Mannila, India
- Holy Family Catholic Church (Srinagar), India
- Church of the Holy Family, Singapore, a Roman Catholic parish

== Europe ==
- Holy Family of Nazareth Church, Oulu, Finland
- Church of the Holy Family (Alcamo), Italy
- Church of the Holy Family (Barletta), Italy
- Church of the Holy Family, Kaliningrad, Russia
- Holy Family Church, Bratislava, Slovakia
- Sagrada Família, Barcelona, Spain, the Expiatory Temple of the Holy Family
- Church of the Holy Family, Dunblane, Scotland, United Kingdom

== North America ==
=== Canada ===
- Holy Family Roman Catholic Church (Toronto), Ontario
- Holy Family Cathedral (Saskatoon), Saskatchewan

=== United States ===
==== California ====
- Church of the Holy Family (Agoura Hills, California)
- Holy Family Catholic Church (Artesia, California)
- Holy Family Catholic Church (Glendale, California)
- Holy Family Catholic Church (Orange, California)

==== Illinois ====
- Holy Family Catholic Church (Chicago)
- Church of the Holy Family (Cahokia Heights, Illinois)
- Holy Family Church (North Chicago, Illinois)

==== New York ====
- Church of the Holy Family (Manhattan)
- Church of the Holy Family (New Rochelle, New York)
- Church of the Holy Family (Staten Island)

==== Elsewhere in the United States ====
- Holy Family Old Cathedral (Anchorage, Alaska)
- Holy Family Church (Fairfield, Connecticut)
- Church of the Holy Family (Columbus, Georgia)
- Holy Family Catholic Church (Fort Madison, Iowa)
- Church of the Holy Family (Eveleth, Minnesota)
- Holy Family Catholic Church Historic District, Natchez, Mississippi
- Holy Family Mission (Glacier County, Montana), Browning, Montana
- Holy Family Catholic Church (Omaha, Nebraska)
- Holy Family Church (Omaha, Nebraska)
- Holy Family Catholic Church (Frenchtown, Ohio)
- Holy Family Cathedral (Tulsa, Oklahoma)
- Holy Family Catholic Church (Philadelphia), Pennsylvania, in the Roxborough section of Philadelphia
- Holy Family Church (Pittsburgh), Pennsylvania
- Holy Family Church, School, and Rectory, Mitchell, South Dakota
- Ukrainian Catholic National Shrine of the Holy Family, Washington, DC

== South America ==
=== Peru ===
- Church of Jesus, Mary, and Joseph, Lima

== See also ==
- Church of Our Lady and Saint Joseph
- Family Church (disambiguation)
- Holy Family (disambiguation)
- Holy Family Cathedral (disambiguation)
