= List of parishes in the Archdiocese of Philadelphia =

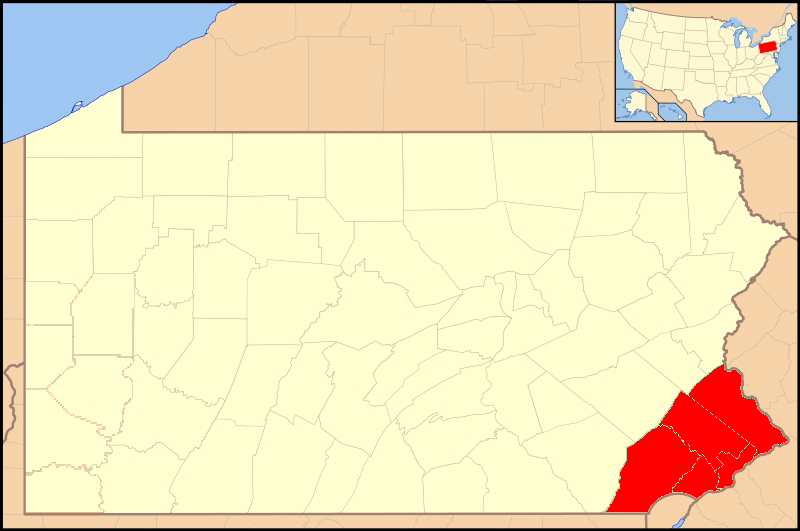
Map of the Archdiocese of Philadelphia within Pennsylvania

This is a list of current and former parishes in the Roman Catholic Archdiocese of Philadelphia. There are currently 214 active parishes in the archdiocese, divided for administrative purposes into four episcopal regions headed by an individual auxiliary bishop. These episcopal regions are then divided further into 12 deaneries, each headed by a pastor of one of the parishes within that deanery. The archbishop of Philadelphia, Nelson J. Pérez, has oversight over the whole archdiocese.

The cathedral church of the diocese is the Cathedral Basilica of Saints Peter and Paul in the city of Philadelphia. The oldest parish and church in the archdiocese is Old St. Joseph's in Philadelphia, which was founded in 1733.

== Episcopal Region I ==
Episcopal Region I comprises Delaware and Chester counties and is further divided into four deaneries (two per county). Auxiliary Bishop John J. McIntyre oversees the region.

=== Delaware County East deanery ===
- Dean: George A. Majoros

Parish	Location	Founded	Pastor/Parochial Administrator	Membership	Ref.
Saint Andrew the Apostle	Drexel Hill	1916	Marc F. Capizzi	3,662	
Annunciation B.V.M.	Havertown	1927	Kevin J. Gallagher	4,318	
Saint Bernadette of Lourdes	Drexel Hill	1947	Christopher R. Coffiey	4,437	
Blessed Virgin Mary	Darby	1913	David C. Quitugua	1,719	
Saint Charles Borromeo	Drexel Hill	1849	George A. Majoros	1,114	
Saint Denis	Havertown	1825	Kevin J. Gallagher	7,140	
Saint Dorothy	Drexel Hill	1947	Joseph G. Prior	5,344	
Saint Eugene	Primos	1955	Joseph M. McDermott	2,426	
Saint Francis of Assisi	Springfield	1923	Matthew J. Tralies	8,999	
Saint George	Glenolden	1923	Vacant	2,676	
Holy Cross	Springfield	1948	Steven W. Kiernan	2,421	
Saint Joseph	Collingdale	1916	Thomas M. Sodano	1,698	
Saint Kevin	Springfield	1955	John C. Moloney	3,853	
Saint Laurence	Upper Darby	1917	Thomas P. Whittingham	5,287	
Saint Philomena	Lansdowne	1898	Paul A. Castellani	2,855	
Saint Pius X	Broomall	1955	Matthew P. Windle	10,576	
Sacred Heart	Havertown	1927	John B. Flanagan	6,626	
Sacred Heart (Note: National parish for Polish Americans in Delaware County)	Clifton Heights	1910	George A. Majoros	225	

=== Delaware County West deanery ===
- Dean: Michael J. Matz

Parish	Location	Founded	Pastor/Parochial Administrator	Membership	Ref.
Saint Anastasia	Newtown Square	1912	Brandon M. Artman	9,661	
Saint Colman	Ardmore	1907	John J. Ames	1,654	
Saint Francis de Sales	Lenni	1894	Vacant	2,993	
Saint Gabriel	Norwood	1891	John D. Hand	5,100	
Saint John Chrysostom	Wallingford	1952	Edward J. Hallinan	5,857	
Saint John Fisher	Boothwyn	1971	James C. Otto	5,100	
Saint John Neumann	Bryn Mawr	1964	Michael J. Matz	4,346	
Saint Joseph	Aston	1947	Henry F. Graebe	6,653	
Saint Katharine Drexel	Chester	1993	Robert A. Ianelli	862	
Saint Katharine Siena	Wayne	1893	Hans A. L. Brouwers	7,567	
Saint Madeline	Ridley Park	1908	Sean A. Loomis	5,339	
Saint Mary Magdalen	Media	1963	Kenneth L. Cavara	6,037	
Nativity B.V.M.	Media	1868	Edward H. Bell	4,436	
Our Lady of Charity	Brookhaven	1952	James E. Goerner	2,598	
Our Lady of Fatima	Secane	1952	Amalraj Sawarimuthu	4,386	
Our Lady of Peace	Milmont Park	1922	Joseph C. McCaffrey	4,303	
Our Lady of Perpetual Help	Morton	1907	Philip J. Lowe	5,569	
Our Mother of Good Counsel	Bryn Mawr	1885	Joseph S. Mostardi	3,928	
Saint Rose of Lima	Eddystone	1890	James E. Goerner	2,959	
Saint Thomas of Villanova	Villanova	1848	Joseph L. Narog	4,947	
Saint Thomas the Apostle	Glen Mills	1729	Stephen E. Shott	7,626	

=== Chester County West deanery ===
- Dean: Michael J. Gerlach

Parish	Location	Founded	Pastor/Parochial Administrator	Membership	Ref.
Saint Agnes	West Chester	1793	Louis P. Bellopede	11,719	
Assumption B.V.M.	West Grove	1873	Brian T. Connolly	6,068	
Saint Cornelius	Chadds Ford	1963	David E. Diamond	6,567	
Saint Gabriel of the Sorrowful Mother	Avondale	1988	Anthony J. DiGuglielmo	2,175	
Saint Joseph	Coatesville	1924	Komlan D. Gnangba	1,932	
Saint Maximilian Kolbe	West Chester	1986	Christopher J. Papa	8,730	
Our Lady of Consolation	Parkesburg	1853	Sean F. O'Neill	2,885	
Our Lady of the Rosary	Coatesville	1917	Komlan D. Gnangba	2,847	
Saint Patrick	Kennett Square	1869	Mark A. Tobin	4,910	
Saint Peter	West Brandywine	1963	Michael S. Olivere	6,329	
Saints Peter and Paul	West Chester	1967	Michael J. Reilly	6,364	
Saint Rocco (Note: National parish for Spanish speakers in the Avondale area)	Avondale	2010	Francis J. Depman	14,169	
Sacred Heart	Oxford	1915	Anthony M. Raymundo	5,245	
Saints Simon and Jude	West Chester	1961	Michael J. Gerlach	12,330	

=== Chester County North deanery ===
- Dean: Christopher B. Rogers

Parish	Location	Founded	Pastor/Parochial Administrator	Membership	Ref.
Saint Ann	Phoenixville	1905	Daniel J. Arechabala	6,332	
Saint Basil the Great	Kimberton	1965	John P. Stokely	4,442	
Saint Elizabeth	Upper Uwchlan	2000	John E. Donia	9,861	
Saint Isaac Jogues	Wayne	1970	Albin J. Grous	2,942	
Saint Joseph	Spring City	1919	Charles R. O'Hara	2,504	
Saint Joseph	Downingtown	1851	Christopher B. Rogers	17,304	
Saint Mary of the Assumption	Phoenixville	1840	Vacant	1,705	
Saint Monica	Berwyn	1897	Paul J. O'Donnell	3,317	
Saint Norbert	Paoli	1956	Steven J. Albero	7,015	
Our Lady of the Assumption (Note: National parish for Italian Americans in the Main Line area)	Strafford	1908	Gerald P. Carey	2,476	
Saint Patrick	Malvern	1915	Joseph P. Duncan	10,075	
Saints Philip and James	Exton	1959	Anthony R. Hangholt	7,919	
Saint Thomas More	South Coventry	1968	Matthew R. VanSmoorenburg	2,361	

== Episcopal Region II ==
Episcopal Region II comprises the entirety of Montgomery County and is further divided into three deaneries. Auxiliary Bishop Keith J. Chylinski oversees the region.

=== Montgomery County West deanery ===
- Dean: Joseph T. Shenosky

Parish	Location	Founded	Pastor/Parochial Administrator	Membership	Ref.
Saint Aloysius	Pottstown	1856	Wesly L. Taveras Medina	7,270	
Corpus Christi	Lansdale	1964	John D. Schiele	9,600	
Saint Eleanor	Collegeville	1911	J. Brian Bransfield	13,742	
Epiphany of Our Lord	Plymouth Meeting	1957	Thomas D. O'Donald	4,385	
Saint Gabriel of the Sorrowful Mother	Stowe	1929	Matthew R. VanSmoorenburg	752	
Saint Helena	Blue Bell	1919	Joseph W. Bongard	7,953	
Saint Maria Goretti	Hatfield	1953	John C. Nguyen	9,771	
Saint Mary	Schwenksville	1926	James M. Cox	7,125	
Mary, Mother of the Redeemer	North Wales	1987	Joseph T. Shenosky	10,735	
Saint Philip Neri	Pennsburg	1919	Michael J. Saban	4,846	
Saint Rose of Lima	North Wales	1919	Bernard J. Taglianetti	3,167	
Sacred Heart	Royersford	1973	Tadeusz Gorka	4,694	
Saint Stanislaus	Lansdale	1876	Patrick J. Brady	7,727	
Saint Teresa of Avila	Norristown	1918	J. Jerome Wild	2,585	
Saint Teresa of Calcutta	Schwenksville	2006	Paul C. Brandt	11,639	
Saint Titus	Norristown	1962	Joseph W. Bongard	4,097	
Visitation B.V.M.	Norristown	1954	Robert M. Gross	10,580	

=== Montgomery County Central deanery ===
- Dean: Charles L. Sangermano

Parish	Location	Founded	Pastor/Parochial Administrator	Membership	Ref.
Saint Francis of Assisi	Norristown	1923	Richard J. Smith	3,539	
Holy Saviour (Note: National parish for Italian speakers in the Norristown area)	Norristown	1903	Charles L. Sangermano	4,820	
Saint John Vianney	Gladwyne	1927	William G. Donovan	2,997	
Saint Margaret	Narberth	1900	Paul V. Dougherty	3,379	
Saint Mary (Note: Quasi-parish that prays the Traditional Latin Mass)	Conshohocken	2018	Carl Gismondi	1,167	
Saint Matthew	Conshohocken	1851	Joseph Devlin	2,305	
Saint Matthias	Bala Cynwyd	1906	Joseph F. Gleason	1,631	
Mother of Divine Providence	King of Prussia	1954	Thomas J. Gardner	5,858	
Saint Patrick	Norristown	1835	Przemyslaw L. Rozestwinski	8,231	
Saint Paul	East Norriton	1963	Richard K. McFadden	2,318	
Presentation B.V.M.	Wynnewood	1954	Eduardo G. Montero	1,419	
Sacred Heart	Swedesburg	1907	Peter J. DiMaria	2,059	

=== Montgomery County East deanery ===
- Dean: Brian P. Hennessy

Parish	Location	Founded	Pastor/Parochial Administrator	Membership	Ref.
Saint Albert the Great	Huntingdon Valley	1962	Robert B. McDermott	6,235	
Saint Alphonsus	Maple Glen	1963	Brian P. Hennessy	7,028	
Saint Anthony of Padua	Ambler	1886	James T. McGuinn	5,337	
Saint Catherine of Siena	Horsham	1963	Joseph F. Rymdeika	8,179	
Saint Luke the Evangelist	Willow Grove	1919	Alexander W. Pancoast	6,440	
Saint Genevieve	Flourtown	1953	Carl F. Janicki	5,707	
Saint Hilary of Poitiers	Rydal	1962	Gregory J. Fairbanks	2,934	
Holy Martyrs	Oreland	1949	Vacant	2,369	
Immaculate Conception B.V.M.	Jenkintown	1866	Joseph Howarth	3,351	
Saint James	Elkins Park	1923	Andrew Labatorio	963	
Saint Joseph	Ambler	1920	James T. McGuinn	2,169	
Saint Joseph	Cheltenham	1953	Dominic Ishaq	750	
Saint Luke the Evangelist	Glenside	1905	Joseph D. Brandt	6,389	
Our Lady Help of Christians	Abington	1953	Anthony W. Janton	3,270	
Saint Philip Neri	Lafayette Hill	1945	George J. Szparagowski	6,879	
Presentation B.V.M.	Cheltenham	1890	Dominic Ishaq	3,010	
Queen of Peace	Ardsley	1954	James R. DeGrassa	7,067	

== Episcopal Region III ==
Episcopal Region III comprises the entirety of Bucks County and is further divided into two deaneries. Auxiliary Bishop Christopher R. Cooke oversees the region.

=== Bucks County Southeast deanery ===
- Dean: John R. Weber

Parish	Location	Founded	Pastor/Parochial Administrator	Membership	Ref.
Saint Charles Borromeo	Bensalem	1903	Philip M. Forlano	8,202	
Saint Ephrem	Bensalem	1966	Michael G. Speziale	7,610	
Saint Frances Cabrini	Fairless Hills	1953	Michael P. McCormac	5,615	
Holy Trinity	Morrisville	1900	Vacant	3,310	
Saint John Bosco	Hatboro	1953	Gary J. Kramer	7,492	
Saint John the Evangelist	Morrisville	1964	Vacant	5,786	
Saint Mark	Bristol	1844	Vacant	5,512	
Saint Michael the Archangel	Levittown	1953	Jonathan J. Dalin	8,428	
Our Lady of Good Counsel	Southampton	1923	Robert G. Suskey	10,037	
Our Lady of Grace	Penndel	1908	William J. Monahan	7,502	
Queen of the Universe	Levittown	1955	John R. Weber	10,383	
Saint Thomas Aquinas	Croydon	1922	David A. Fernandes	1,607	

=== Bucks County Central and North deanery ===
- Dean: John C. Marine

Parish	Location	Founded	Pastor/Parochial Administrator	Membership	Ref.
Saint Agnes	Sellersville	1919	Anthony T. Rossi	4,083	
Saint Andrew	Newtown	1880	Kevin C. Lawrence	21,000	
Assumption B.V.M.	Feasterville	1950	John F. Wackerman	6,234	
Saint Bede the Venerable	Holland	1965	John C. Marine	11,473	
Saint Cyril of Jerusalem	Jamison	1965	Robert J. Powell	6,200	
Saint Ignatius of Antioch	Yardley	1920	Andrew C. Brownholtz	9,573	
Saint Isidore	Quakertown	1886	Kenneth C. Brabazon	6,615	
Saint John the Baptist	Ottsville	1743	Selvaraj Lucas	1,927	
Saint Joseph	Warrington	1922	Michael J. Pawelko	3,378	
Saint Jude	Chalfont	1962	Anthony J. Costa	8,730	
Saint Lawrence	Riegelsville	1974	Walter J. Benn	1,089	
Saint Martin of Tours	New Hope	1885	Stephen F. Leva	3,234	
Nativity of Our Lord	Warminster	1956	Joseph G. Watson	8,895	
Our Lady of Guadalupe	Doylestown	2000	Joseph P. Gentili	10,299	
Our Lady of Mount Carmel	Doylestown	1850	Matthew W. Guckin	12,970	
Our Lady of the Sacred Heart	Hilltown	1919	Tadeusz R. Lizinczyk	5,166	
Saint Robert Bellarmine	Warrington	1968	James D. Beisel	7,283	
Saint Vincent de Paul	Richboro	1968	William J. Chiriaco	5,305	

== Episcopal Region IV ==
Episcopal Region IV comprises the entirety of the city of Philadelphia and is further divided into five deaneries. Auxiliary Bishop Efren V. Esmilla oversees the region.

=== Philadelphia South and East deanery ===
- Dean: Joseph J. Kelley

Parish	Location	Founded	Pastor/Parochial Administrator	Membership	Ref.
Saint Agnes–Saint John Nepomucene (Note: National parish for Slovak Americans in the archdiocese)	Philadelphia	1980 (Note: St. John Nepomucene founded in 1902, St. Agnes founded in 1907; parishes merged in 1980)	Gerald Dennis Gill	93	
Annunciation B.V.M.	Philadelphia	1860	Jonathan G. Rice	2,295	
Saint Augustine	Philadelphia	1796	Christopher J. Drennen	1,351	
Saint Charles Borromeo	Philadelphia	1868	Wellington M. Munoz	339	
Epiphany of Our Lord	Philadelphia	1889	James R. Casey	797	
Saint Gabriel	Philadelphia	1895	Vacant	406	
Holy Name of Jesus	Philadelphia	1905	Alfred E. Bradley	1,234	
Saint Michael	Philadelphia	1831	Fernando Londono	400	
Saint Monica	Philadelphia	1895	Joseph J. Kelley	7,900	
Saint Nicholas of Tolentine (Note: National parish for Italian Americans in the area)	Philadelphia	1912	Nicholas F. Martorano	3,175	
Old Saint Joseph's	Philadelphia	1733	Francis T. Hannafey	1,454	
Old Saint Mary's	Philadelphia	1763	Paul A. DiGirolamo	1,981	
Our Lady of Mount Carmel	Philadelphia	1896	Francis J. Cauterucci	7,581	
Saint Paul	Philadelphia	1843	Paul W. Galetto	1,332	
Saint Peter the Apostle (Note: Hosts the National Shrine of Saint John Neumann)	Philadelphia	1842	Michael J. Cunningham	2,309	
Saint Philip Neri	Philadelphia	1840	Edward P. Kuczynski	758	
Saint Richard of Chichester	Philadelphia	1924	Alessandro P. Giardini	4,516	
Sacred Heart of Jesus	Philadelphia	1871	Shaun L. Mahoney	3,500	
Stella Maris	Philadelphia	1954	John R. DiOrio	3,082	
Saint Thomas Aquinas	Philadelphia	1885	Dominic Tran Minh Duc	2,400	

=== Philadelphia West and Central deanery ===
- Dean: Federico A. Britto

Parish	Location	Founded	Pastor/Parochial Administrator	Membership	Ref.
Saint Agatha–Saint James	Philadelphia	1976 (Note: St. James founded in 1850, St. Agatha founded in 1865; parishes merged in 1976)	Remigio Morales Bermudez Buse	497	
Saint Andrew (Note: National parish for Lithuanian Americans in the archdiocese)	Philadelphia	1924	Gerald Dennis Gill	357	
Saint Barbara	Philadelphia	1921	Federico A. Britto	1,428	
Saint Barnabas	Philadelphia	1919	Miguel Angel Bravo Alvarez	339	
Cathedral Basilica of Saints Peter and Paul (Note: Hosts the Shrine of Saint Katharine Drexel)	Philadelphia	1846	Gerald Dennis Gill	2,361	
Saint Cyprian	Philadelphia	2000	Federico A. Britto	1,138	
Divine Mercy	Philadelphia	2004	Quan M. Trinh	2,275	
Saint Francis de Sales	Philadelphia	1890	Robert Ngageno	450	
Saint Francis Xavier	Philadelphia	1839	Paul C. Convery	1,683	
Saint Ignatius of Loyola	Philadelphia	1893	Federico A. Britto	351	
Saint John the Evangelist	Philadelphia	1830	Thomas R. Betz	3,015	
Saint Malachy	Philadelphia	1850	Matthew K. Biedrzycki	400	
Saint Martin de Porres	Philadelphia	1993	Wilfred E. Emeh	773	
Our Lady of Lourdes	Philadelphia	1894	Matthew H. Phelan	1,879	
Saint Patrick	Philadelphia	1839	Hyacinth Cordell	2,354	

=== Philadelphia Northwest deanery ===
- Dean: Charles Zlock

Parish	Location	Founded	Pastor/Parochial Administrator	Membership	Ref.
Saint Athanasius	Philadelphia	1928	Joseph F. Okonski	375	
Saint Bridget	Philadelphia	1853	James M. Oliver	2,205	
Holy Cross	Philadelphia	1890	Kevin C. Okafor	1,673	
Holy Family	Philadelphia	1885	Timothy F. O'Sullivan	1,194	
Immaculate Heart of Mary	Philadelphia	1952	Edward J. Casey	5,314	
Saint John the Baptist	Philadelphia	1831	Andrew J. Auletta	2,638	
Our Mother of Consolation	Philadelphia	1855	John J. Fisher	3,475	
Saint Raymond of Penafort	Philadelphia	1941	Charles Zlock	1,324	
Saint Vincent de Paul	Philadelphia	1851	Paul C. Convery	1,450	

=== Philadelphia Near Northeast deanery ===
- Dean: Thomas M. Higgins

Parish	Location	Founded	Pastor/Parochial Administrator	Membership	Ref.
Saint Ambrose	Philadelphia	1923	Charles J. Ravert	1,799	
Saint Anne	Philadelphia	1845	Lourdes Sri Dharshanna Jayamanne	5,027	
Saint Cecilia	Philadelphia	1911	Christopher M. Walsh	6,953	
Saint Helena	Philadelphia	1924	Joseph T. Trinh	2,168	
Holy Angels (Note: National parish for Korean Americans in the archdiocese)	Philadelphia	1900	Joseph Soon-Jin Kim	2,046	
Holy Innocents	Philadelphia	1927	Thomas M. Higgins	10,780	
Saint John Paul II	Philadelphia	2019	James P. Olson	2,756	
Saint Martin of Tours	Philadelphia	1923	Andrew F. Lane	3,849	
Our Lady of Hope	Philadelphia	1993	Andrew Labatorio	1,683	
Resurrection of Our Lord	Philadelphia	1928	Vincent E. Smith	5,335	
Saint Veronica	Philadelphia	1872	Roberto Gurrola	3,085	
Visitation B.V.M.	Philadelphia	1873	Francis D. Mulvaney	1,486	
Saint William	Philadelphia	1920	Francesco M. D'Amico	5,675	

=== Philadelphia Far Northeast deanery ===
- Dean: John F. Babowitch

Parish	Location	Founded	Pastor/Parochial Administrator	Membership	Ref.
Saint Anselm	Philadelphia	1962	Jeffrey Stecz	12,656	
Saint Bartholomew	Philadelphia	1919	Francis P. Foley	927	
Saint Bernard	Philadelphia	1927	Joseph N. Accardi	2,298	
Christ the King	Philadelphia	1963	John F. Babowitch	4,297	
Saint Christopher	Philadelphia	1950	Philip G. Bochanski	9,468	
Saint Dominic	Philadelphia	1849	John P. Hutter	2,957	
Saint Jerome	Philadelphia	1955	Brian A. Izzo	4,774	
Saint John Cantius	Philadelphia	1892	Mark S. Kunigonis	2,381	
Saint Katherine of Siena	Philadelphia	1922	Joseph S. Zaleski	8,851	
Saint Martha	Philadelphia	1966	Vacant	4,131	
Maternity B.V.M.	Philadelphia	1870	Joseph L. Maloney	8,620	
Saint Matthew	Philadelphia	1927	Patrick J. Welsh	5,127	
Our Lady of Calvary	Philadelphia	1958	John F. Babowitch	7,247	
Our Lady of Consolation	Philadelphia	1917	Joseph L. Farrell	2,574	
Saint Timothy	Philadelphia	1928	Francis P. Foley	4,776	

== Former parishes ==
Parish/Mission	Location	Founded	Closed	Ref.
Saint Adalbert (Note: National parish for Polish Americans)	Philadelphia	1904	2019 (Note: Merged into Saint John Paul II Parish in Philadelphia)	
Saint Alice	Upper Darby	1922	2013 (Note: Merged into Saint Laurence Parish in Upper Darby; former parish church now a Vietnamese language worship site)	
All Saints	Philadelphia	1860	2013 (Note: Merged into Saint John Cantius Parish in Philadelphia)	
Saint Aloysius (Note: National parish for German Americans)	Philadelphia	1894	2003 (Note: Merged into Saint Gabriel Parish in Philadelphia)	
Saint Alphonsus	Philadelphia	1852	1972 (Note: Merged into Sacred Heart of Jesus Parish in Philadelphia)	
Saint Ann (Note: National parish for Italian Americans)	Bristol	1906	2014 (Note: Merged into Saint Mark Parish in Upper Darby; former parish church now an Italian language worship site)	
Saint Anthony of Padua	Philadelphia	1886	1999 (Note: Merged into Saint Charles Borromeo Parish in Philadelphia)	
Saint Anthony of Padua	Chester	1908	1993 (Note: Merged into Saint Katharine Drexel Parish in Chester)	
Ascension of Our Lord	Philadelphia	1899	2012 (Note: Merged into Holy Innocents Parish in Philadelphia)	
Assumption B.V.M.	Philadelphia	1845	1995 (Note: Merged into Saint John the Evangelist Parish in Philadelphia)	
Saint Augustine	Bridgeport	1892	2014 (Note: Merged into Sacred Heart Parish in Swedesburg; former parish church now a worship site)	
Saint Benedict	Philadelphia	1922	2013 (Note: Merged into Saint Athanasius Parish in Philadelphia; former parish church now a worship site)	
Saint Bonaventure	Philadelphia	1889	1993 (Note: Merged into Saint Veronica Parish in Philadelphia)	
Saint Boniface	Philadelphia	1866	2006 (Note: Merged into Visitation B.V.M. Parish in Philadelphia)	
Saint Brendan	Philadelphia	1925	1934 (Note: Merged into Saint Vincent de Paul Parish in Philadelphia)	
Saint Callistus	Philadelphia	1921	2013 (Note: Merged into Our Lady of Lourdes Parish in Philadelphia)	
Saint Carthage	Philadelphia	1915	2000 (Note: Merged into Saint Cyprian Parish in Philadelphia)	
Saint Casimir (Note: National parish for Lithuanian Americans)	Philadelphia	1893	2011 (Note: Merged into Saint Andrew Parish in Philadelphia; former parish church now a Lithuanian language worship site)	
Saint Catherine of Siena	Philadelphia	1910	1972	
Saint Cecilia	Coatesville	1869	2012 (Note: Merged into Our Lady of the Rosary Parish in Coatesville; former parish church now a worship site)	
Saint Clare	Linfield	1963	2006 (Note: Merged into Saint Teresa of Calcutta Parish in Schwenksville)	
Saint Clement	Philadelphia	1865	2004 (Note: Merged into Divine Mercy Parish in Philadelphia)	
Saint Columba	Philadelphia	1895	1993 (Note: Merged into Saint Martin de Porres Parish in Philadelphia)	
Corpus Christi	Philadelphia	1912	1987	
Saints Cosmas and Damian	Conshohocken	1912	2014 (Note: Merged into Saint Matthew Parish in Conshohocken)	
Saint Cyril of Alexandria	East Lansdowne	1928	2013 (Note: Merged into Saint Philomena Parish in Lansdowne)	
Saint Donato	Philadelphia	1910	2013 (Note: Merged into Our Lady of Lourdes Parish in Philadelphia; former parish church now an Italian language worship site)	
Saint Edmond	Philadelphia	1912	2014 (Note: Merged into Saint Monica Parish in Philadelphia; former parish church now a worship site)	
Saint Edward the Confessor	Philadelphia	1865	1993	
Saint Elizabeth	Philadelphia	1872	1993	
Saint Elizabeth Ann Seton	Bensalem	1976	2014 (Note: Merged into Saint Thomas Aquinas Parish in Croydon; former parish church now a worship site)	
Saint Francis of Assisi	Philadelphia	1899	2012	
Saint George	Philadelphia	1902	2019	
Saint Gertrude	West Conshohocken	1888	2014	
Church of the Gesú	Philadelphia	1868	1993 (Note: Merged into Saint Malachy Parish in Philadelphia)	
Good Shepherd	Philadelphia	1925	2004	
Saint Gregory	Philadelphia	1895	1981 (Note: Merged into Saint Barbara Parish in Philadelphia)	
Saint Hedwig	Chester	1902	1993 (Note: Merged into Sacred Heart Parish in Clifton Heights; former parish church now a worship site)	
Saint Hedwig	Philadelphia	1907	2000 (Note: Merged into Saint Francis Xavier Parish in Philadelphia)	
Saint Henry	Philadelphia	1916	1993 (Note: Merged into Saint Helena Parish in Philadelphia)	
Holy Child	Philadelphia	1909	1993 (Note: Merged into Our Lady of Hope Parish in Philadelphia)	
Holy Saviour	Linwood	1914	2013 (Note: Merged into Saint John Fisher Parish in Boothwyn)	
Holy Spirit	Sharon Hill	1892	2014 (Note: Merged into Saint George Parish in Glenolden; former parish church now a worship site)	
Holy Spirit	Philadelphia	1964	2014 (Note: Merged into Saint Richard Parish in Philadelphia; former parish church now a worship site)	
Holy Trinity	Philadelphia	1788	2009 (Note: Merged into Old Saint Mary's Parish in Philadelphia)	
Holy Trinity	Phoenixville	1903	2012 (Note: Merged into Saint Mary of the Assumption Parish in Phoenixville; former parish church now a worship site)	
Holy Trinity (Note: National parish for Slovak Americans)	Pottstown	1899	2004 (Note: Merged into Saint Aloysius Parish in Pottstown; former parish church now a worship site)	
Saint Hubert	Philadelphia	1924	1940 (Note: Merged into Saint Bernard Parish in Philadelphia)	
Saint Hugh of Cluny	Philadelphia	1922	2013	
Immaculate Conception	Philadelphia	1869	2011 (Note: Merged into Saint Michael Parish in Philadelphia; former parish church now a worship site)	
Immaculate Conception	Philadelphia	1902	2012	
Immaculate Conception	Marcus Hook	1917	2013	
Immaculate Conception B.V.M.	Levittown	1954	2014 (Note: Merged into Queen of the Universe Parish in Levittown)	
Immaculate Heart of Mary	Chester	1873	1993	
Incarnation of Our Lord	Philadelphia	1900	2013	
Saint Irenaeus	Philadelphia	1966	2004 (Note: Merged into Divine Mercy Parish in Philadelphia; former parish church now a worship site)	
Saint Joachim	Philadelphia	1845	2013	
Saint Joan of Arc	Philadelphia	1919	2013 (Note: Merged into Holy Innocents Parish in Philadelphia; former parish church now a worship site)	
Saint John of the Cross	Roslyn	1953	2014 (Note: Merged into Queen of Peace Parish in Ardsley)	
Saint Josaphat	Philadelphia	1898	2012 (Note: Merged into Saint John the Baptist Parish in Philadelphia; former parish church now a worship site)	
Saint Joseph the Worker	Fallsington	1956	2014 (Note: Merged into Saint Frances Cabrini Parish in Fairless Hills)	
Saint Justin Martyr	Narberth	1964	2009 (Note: Merged into Saint John Vianney Parish in Gladwyne)	
King of Peace	Philadelphia	1926	2004	
Saint Ladislaus	Philadelphia	1906	2003 (Note: Merged into Saint John the Baptist Parish in Philadelphia)	
Saint Laurentius	Philadelphia	1882	2013 (Note: Merged into Holy Name of Jesus Parish in Philadelphia)	
Saint Leo the Great	Philadelphia	1884	2013 (Note: Merged into Our Lady of Consolation Parish in Philadelphia; former parish church now a worship site)	
Saint Louis	Yeadon	1928	2013 (Note: Merged into Blessed Virgin Mary Parish in Darby; former parish church now a worship site)	
Saint Lucy	Philadelphia	1927	2012 (Note: Merged into Holy Family Parish in Philadelphia; former parish church now a worship site)	
Saint Ludwig	Philadelphia	1891	1975	
Saint Madeleine Sophie	Philadelphia	1925	2013 (Note: Merged into Holy Cross Parish in Philadelphia)	
Saint Margaret Mary Alacoque	Essington	1921	2014 (Note: Merged into Saint Gabriel Parish in Norwood; former parish church now a worship site)	
Saint Mary	Conshohocken	1905	2014	
Saint Mary Magdalen de Pazzi	Philadelphia	1852	2000 (Note: Merged into Saint Paul Parish in Philadelphia; former parish church now a worship site)	
Saint Mary of Czestochowa	Philadelphia	1927	2000 (Note: Merged into Saint Barnabas Parish in Philadelphia)	
Saint Mary of the Assumption	Philadelphia	1849	2012	
Saint Mary of the Eternal	Philadelphia	1911	1976	
Mater Dolorosa	Philadelphia	1911	2013	
Saint Michael	Chester	1842	1993	
Saint Michael	Philadelphia	1923	1958 (Note: Merged into Our Lady of Calvary Parish in Philadelphia)	
Saint Michael of the Saints	Philadelphia	1924	1982	
Most Blessed Sacrament	Philadelphia	1901	2008 (Note: Merged into Saint Francis de Sales Parish in Philadelphia)	
Most Precious Blood of Our Lord	Philadelphia	1907	1993	
Mother of Divine Grace	Philadelphia	1926	2019	
Nativity B.V.M.	Philadelphia	1882	2019	
Notre Dame de Lourdes	Swarthmore	1959	2014 (Note: Merged into Our Lady of Peace Parish in Milmont Park)	
Our Lady Help of Christians	Philadelphia	1885	2016	
Our Lady of Angels	Philadelphia	1907	2006	
Our Lady of Fatima	Bensalem	1954	2014 (Note: Merged into Saint Charles Borromeo Parish in Bensalem; former parish church now a worship site)	
Our Lady of Good Counsel	Philadelphia	1898	1932 (Note: Merged into Saint Paul Parish in Philadelphia)	
Our Lady of Loreto	Philadelphia	1932	2000	
Our Lady of Mercy	Philadelphia	1889	1984	
Our Lady of Mount Carmel	Bridgeport	1924	2014	
Our Lady of Pompeii	Philadelphia	1914	1993	
Our Lady of Ransom	Philadelphia	1954	2017	
Our Lady of the Blessed Sacrament	Philadelphia	1910	1972 (Note: Merged into the Cathedral Basilica of Saints Peter and Paul in Philadelphia)	
Our Lady of the Blessed Sacrament	Philadelphia	2005	2013	
Our Lady of the Holy Rosary	Philadelphia	1928	1977	
Our Lady of the Holy Souls	Philadelphia	1909	1993	
Our Lady of the Miraculous Medal Chapel (Note: National parish for Spanish speakers)	Philadelphia	1912	2013	
Our Lady of the Rosary	Philadelphia	1886	2005	
Our Lady of Victory	Philadelphia	1899	2005	
Our Lady of Vilna	Chester	1924	1972	
Our Mother of Sorrows	Philadelphia	1852	2013 (Note: Merged into Saint Ignatius of Loyola Parish in Philadelphia)	
Our Mother of Sorrows	Bridgeport	1926	2001 (Note: Merged into Sacred Heart Parish in Swedesburg)	
Saint Patrick	Dublin	1944	1979 (Note: Merged into Our Lady of the Sacred Heart Parish in Hilltown)	
Saint Peter	Pottstown	1924	2006	
Saint Peter Claver	Philadelphia	1886	1985	
Saint Raphael	Philadelphia	1904	1989	
Resurrection of Our Lord	Chester	1911	1993	
Saint Rita of Cascia	Philadelphia	1907	2016 (Note: Merged into Annunciation B.V.M. Parish in Philadelphia)	
Saint Robert	Chester	1922	1993	
Saint Roch	Philadelphia	1926	2000 (Note: Merged into Mother of Divine Grace Parish in Philadelphia)	
Saint Rose of Lima	Philadelphia	1921	2013	
Sacred Heart (Note: National parish for Hungarian Americans)	Philadelphia	1913	1977 (Note: Merged into Saint Michael Parish in Philadelphia)	
Sacred Heart	Phoenixville	1900	2012 (Note: Merged into Saint Ann Parish in Phoenixville)	
Seven Dolors	Wyndmoor	1916	2003 (Note: Merged into Saint Genevieve Parish in Flourtown)	
Saint Stanislaus	Philadelphia	1891	2006 (Note: Merged into Saint Philip Neri Parish in Philadelphia; former parish church now a worship site)	
Saint Stanislaus Kostka	Coatesville	1907	2012 (Note: Merged into Saint Joseph Parish in Coatesville)	
Saint Stephen	Philadelphia	1843	1993	
Saint Teresa of Avila	Philadelphia	1853	1972	
Saint Therese of the Child Jesus	Philadelphia	1925	2013 (Note: Merged into Holy Cross Parish in Philadelphia)	
Transfiguration of Our Lord	Philadelphia	1905	2000	
