= Church of Our Lady and Saint Joseph =

Church of Our Lady and Saint Joseph may refer to:

== England ==
- Coldham Cottage (Church of Our Lady Immaculate and St Joseph)
- Our Lady and St Joseph's Church, Carlisle
- Our Lady and St Joseph Church, Heywood
- Our Lady Immaculate and St Joseph Church, Prescot
- Church of St Mary and St Joseph, Poplar

== Ireland ==
- Church of Our Lady and St Joseph, Prosperous

== Peru ==
- Church of Our Lady of the Forsaken and of Saint Joseph, Lima

== United States ==
- Church of Sts. Joseph and Mary-Catholic (Minnesota)

== See also ==
- Holy Family Church
- Church of Our Lady
- List of churches named after Saint Joseph
