= East Lansdowne, Pennsylvania =

Borough in Pennsylvania, US

- Borough
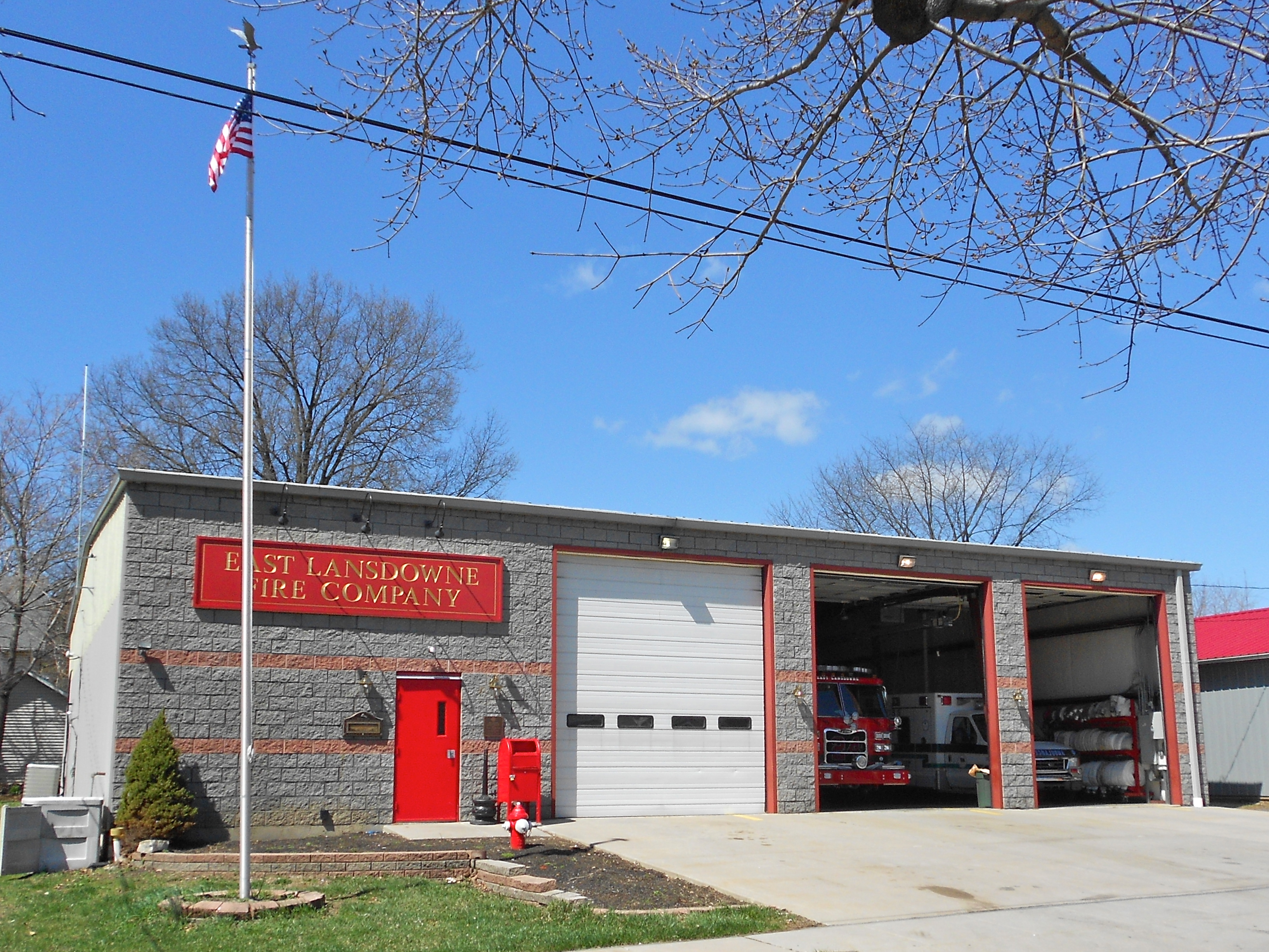
- East Lansdowne Fire Department

- Location of East Lansdowne in Delaware County, Pennsylvania
- Coordinates: 39°56′39″N 75°15′37″W
- Country: United States
- State: Pennsylvania
- County: Delaware
- Founded: 1682
- Incorporated: June 3, 1911
- Named for: Lansdowne Boro

Government
  - Mayor: Mojavie “Joe” Bland

Area
  - Total: 0.206 sq mi (0.534 km^{2})
  - Land: 0.206 sq mi (0.534 km^{2})
  - Water: 0 sq mi (0.000 km^{2})
- Elevation: 118 ft (36 m)

Population (2020)
  - Total: 2,714
  - Estimate (2023): 2,687
  - Density: 13,020/sq mi (5,028/km^{2})
- Time zone: UTC−5 (Eastern (EST))
  - Summer (DST): UTC−4 (EDT)
- ZIP Code: 19050
- Area codes: 610, 484, and 835
- FIPS code: 42-21384
- GNIS feature ID: 1215181
- Sales tax: 6.0%
- Website: eastlansdowne.org

East Lansdowne is a borough in Delaware County Pennsylvania, United States. The population was 2,714 at the 2020 census.

== Geography ==
East Lansdowne is located at 39°56′39″N 75°15′37″W (39.944162, -75.260253).

According to the United States Census Bureau, the borough has a total area of 0.206 square miles (0.53 km^{2}), all land.

East Lansdowne is located approximately one-half mile west of Southwest Philadelphia and is surrounded by Upper Darby Township, namely the Stonehurst/Stonehurst Hills/69th Street and Fernwood neighborhoods. Union Avenue to the west separates Lansdowne from Upper Darby, while the East Lansdowne border is near Hirst Avenue, leaving a one-block expanse of land that is part of Upper Darby Township. It is the former railroad track that gives East Lansdowne borough's western boundary that vaguely ovoid shape.

The borough of Yeadon is south of SEPTA's Media/Wawa Line railroad tracks, about one block south of East Lansdowne.

== Education ==
William Penn School District serves East Lansdowne. The district was created in 1972.

- East Lansdowne Basics Magnet Elementary School (K-6)
  - In 1972 the school's library was open to the public, one of the few school libraries to do so, as East Lansdowne had no other public library. That year, it had an area for sports called the "dust bowl". That year John Hilferty of the Philadelphia Inquirer described it as "even more minuscule" compared to the East Lansdowne borough, which he called "Lilliputian" due to its 0.21 square miles (0.54 km^{2}) size.
- Vision Academy Charter School (K-8)
- Penn Wood Middle School (7–8) (Darby)
- Penn Wood High School, Cypress Street Campus (9–10)(Yeadon)
- Penn Wood High School, Green Ave Campus (11–12) (Lansdowne)

=== Private schools ===
Saint Cyril of Alexandria Catholic Elementary School (K-8), founded in September, 1929, was moved to and combined with St. Philomena in nearby Lansdowne, PA in 2021 after a protracted battle to keep the school open.

In December, 2005 the archdiocese proposed closing it, but it remained open after community members, inspired by a child with cystic fibrosis who asked for the Make a Wish foundation to save his school, donated $200,000 to keep it open. This was dubbed the "Miracle at St. Cyril." In 2012 the Roman Catholic Archdiocese of Philadelphia proposed closing it again, intending to merge it into St. Andrew School of Upper Darby. However the archdiocese reversed that decision. Instead it became the Independence Mission Schools, not operated by the archdiocese. In 2012 there were 207 students.

Vision Academy Charter School purchased the St. Cyril of Alexandria buildings from the Archdiocese of Philadelphia and opened during the 2021–22 school year.

== Religion ==
The Roman Catholic Archdiocese of Philadelphia operates Catholic churches. St. Cyril of Alexandria Church in East Lansdowne opened in June 1928. In 2013, St. Cyril of Alexandria merged into St. Philomena Church in Lansdowne, with the St. Cyril parish closed.

== Demographics ==
Historical population
Census	Pop.	Note	%±
1920	1,561		—
1930	3,168		102.9%
1940	3,323		4.9%
1950	3,527		6.1%
1960	3,224		−8.6%
1970	3,186		−1.2%
1980	2,806		−11.9%
1990	2,691		−4.1%
2000	2,586		−3.9%
2010	2,668		3.2%
2020	2,714		1.7%
2023 (est.)	2,687	▼	−1.0%
U.S. Decennial Census; 2020 Census

=== 2020 census ===
East Lansdowne, Pennsylvania – Racial and ethnic composition Note: the US Census treats Hispanic/Latino as an ethnic category. This table excludes Latinos from the racial categories and assigns them to a separate category. Hispanics/Latinos may be of any race.
Race / Ethnicity (NH = Non-Hispanic)	Pop 2000	Pop 2010	Pop 2020	% 2000	% 2010	2020
White alone (NH)	1,833	790	429	70.88%	29.61%	15.81%
Black or African American alone (NH)	521	1,452	1,780	20.15%	54.42%	65.59%
Native American or Alaska Native alone (NH)	2	3	6	0.08%	0.11%	0.22%
Asian alone (NH)	156	232	201	6.03%	8.70%	7.41%
Native Hawaiian or Pacific Islander alone (NH)	0	6	0	0.00%	0.22%	0.00%
Other race alone (NH)	3	6	26	0.12%	0.22%	0.96%
Mixed race or Multiracial (NH)	39	63	101	1.51%	2.36%	3.72%
Hispanic or Latino (any race)	32	116	171	1.24%	4.35%	6.30%
Total	2,586	2,668	2,714	100.00%	100.00%	100.00%

As of the 2020 census, there were 2,714 people, 931 households, and 644 families residing in the borough. The population density was 13,100.6 inhabitants per square mile (5,058.2/km^{2}). There were 1,024 housing units. The racial makeup of the borough was 16.6% White, 66.0% African American, 0.4% Native American, 7.4% Asian, 0.0% Pacific Islander, 4.8% from some other races and 4.8% from two or more races. Hispanic or Latino of any race were 6.3% of the population.

=== 2010 census ===
As of the 2010 census, there were 2,668 people, 923 households, and _ families residing in the borough. The racial makeup of the borough was 30.5% White, 55.8% African American, 0.1% Native American, 8.8% Asian, 0.2% Native Hawaiian and Other Pacific Islander, 1.3% from other races, and 3.1% from two or more races. Hispanic or Latino of any race were 4.3% of the population.

=== 2000 census ===
As of the 2000 census, there were 2,586 people, 938 households, and 608 families residing in the borough. The population density was 12,517.6 inhabitants per square mile (4,833.1/km^{2}). There were 1,012 housing units at an average density of 4,898.6 inhabitants per square mile (1,891.4/km^{2}). The racial makeup of the borough was 71.2% White, 26.8% African American, 0.08% Native American, 6.03% Asian, 0.46% from other races, and 1.70% from two or more races. Hispanic or Latino of any race were 1.24% of the population.

There were 938 households out of which 32.8% had children under the age of 18 living with them, 45.6% were married couples living together, 12.7% had a female householder with no husband present, and 35.1% were non-families. 28.9% of all households were made up of individuals and 10.3% had someone living alone who was 65 years of age or older. The average household size was 2.71 and the average family size was 3.41.

In the borough the population was spread out with 25.8% under the age of 18, 8.6% from 18 to 24, 31.7% from 25 to 44, 19.9% from 45 to 64, and 14.0% who were 65 years of age or older. The median age was 37 years. For every 100 females there were 100.2 males. For every 100 females age 18 and over, there were 93.6 males.

The median income for a household in the borough was $44,205, and the median income for a family was $53,021. Males had a median income of $37,813 versus $28,409 for females. The per capita income for the borough was $19,558. About 6.2% of families and 7.6% of the population were below the poverty line, including 4.9% of those under age 18 and 10.0% of those age 65 or over.

== Transportation ==
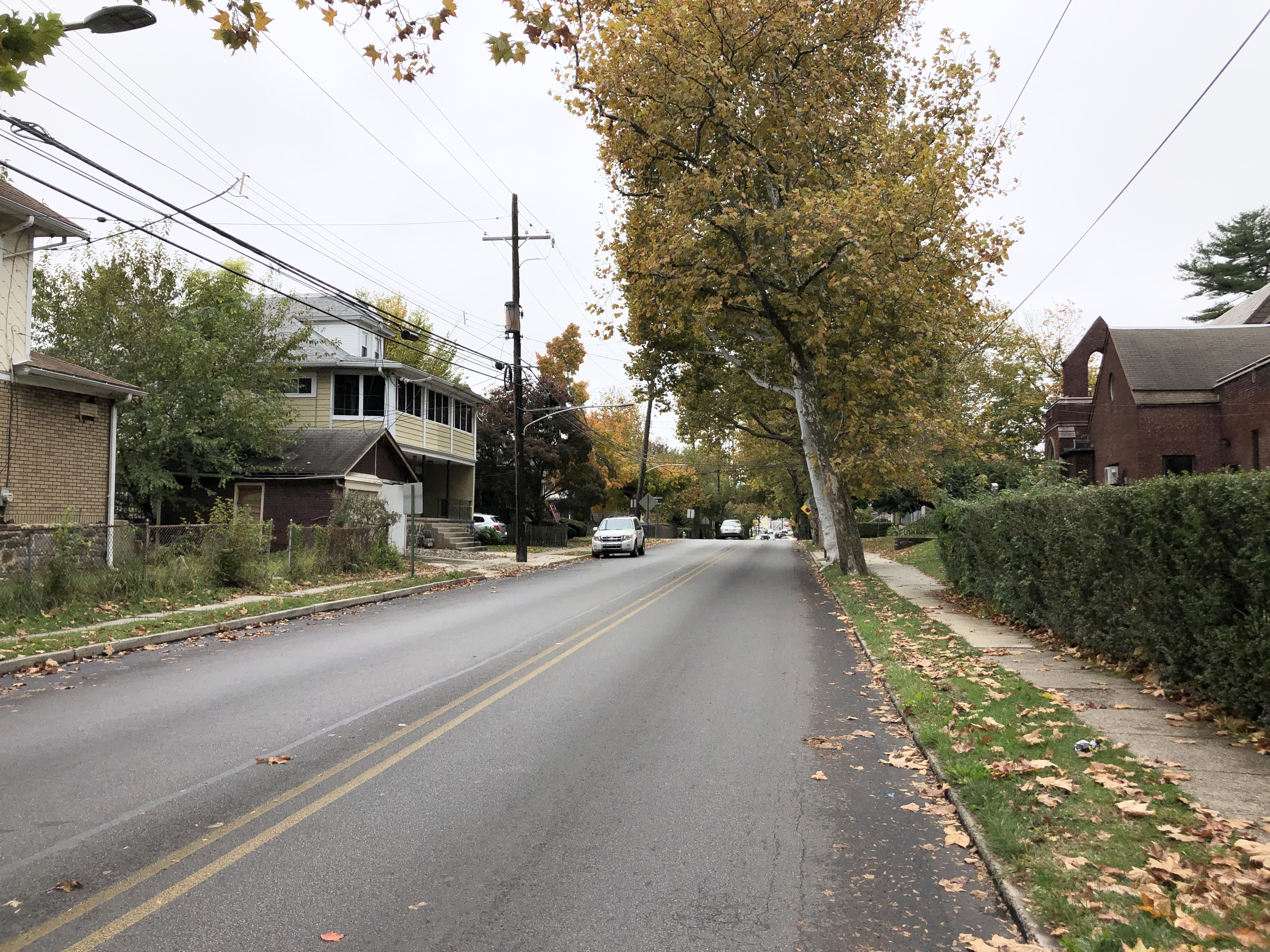
Pembroke Avenue in East Lansdowne

As of 2014, there were 5.03 miles (8.10 km) of public roads in East Lansdowne, of which 0.66 miles (1.06 km) were maintained by the Pennsylvania Department of Transportation (PennDOT) and 4.37 miles (7.03 km) were maintained by the borough.

No numbered highways serve East Lansdowne directly. The main thoroughfares in the borough include Pembroke Avenue and Church Lane, which intersect near the eastern edge of the borough.

== Notable features ==
Oldest 4th of July parade and celebration in Delaware County.
