= Robert Elmore =

American organist and composer (1913–1985)

- Born: Robert Hall Elmore; January 2, 1913; Ramapuram, Chennai, India
- Died: September 22, 1985 (aged 72); Wayne, Pennsylvania, United States
- Known for: Organ virtuoso, teacher, composer

Robert Hall Elmore (January 2, 1913 – September 22, 1985) was an American composer, organist, pianist who was active in Philadelphia during the mid 20th century and who wrote some organ pieces that are included in recitals today.

== Early life ==
Robert Elmore was born on January 2, 1913, in Ramapuram, Chennai, India where his parents were missionaries. The family relocated to Lincoln, Nebraska in 1918 where Elmore began studying piano at age six and organ at age nine. His first composition was written at age 11.

In 1925, the family relocated once again to Wayne, Pennsylvania where Elmore was to live at 130 Walnut Avenue until his death in 1985. Shortly thereafter he began study with famed organist and composer Pietro Yon who was then organist and music director at St. Patrick's Cathedral, New York. Yon was sufficiently impressed with Elmore's abilities to have referred to him as "the foremost American organist of the day".

== Professional assignments ==
While still in his teens Elmore was appointed organist at the Central Baptist Church, Wayne, Pennsylvania (1925–1933). He also performed as a theatre organist at the Lincoln, Bryn Mawr Seville and Anthony Wayne theaters. From 1938 to 1955 he was organist at the Holy Trinity Church in Philadelphia. In 1955 he was appointed organist of the Central Moravian Church in Bethlehem. In 1969, Dr. Elmore accepted a call to become the music director of Tenth Presbyterian Church in Philadelphia, where he remained until his death. The influence of classical, church and theatre music merged with his natural virtuosity and a sense of the theatricality to create a uniquely personal compositional style. Among his numerous non-church musical positions were: professor of composition at the University of Pennsylvania; official organist of The Philadelphia Orchestra; organ professor at the Philadelphia Conservatory of Music; and many others. His recordings of the Kimball and Midmer-Losh pipe organs at the Atlantic City Convention Hall in the mid-1950's were critically acclaimed. As a closing remark, his opera "It Began at Breakfast" was the first opera to be televised, a fact Dr. Elmore was justly proud of.
