= Family Church =

Family church may refer to:

- First Family Church in Overland Park, Kansas
- Family Integrated Church

== See also ==
- Holy Family Church (disambiguation)
