= Holy Family Church, Bratislava =

Church in Bratislava, Slovakia

Coordinates: 48°06′45″N 17°06′26″E

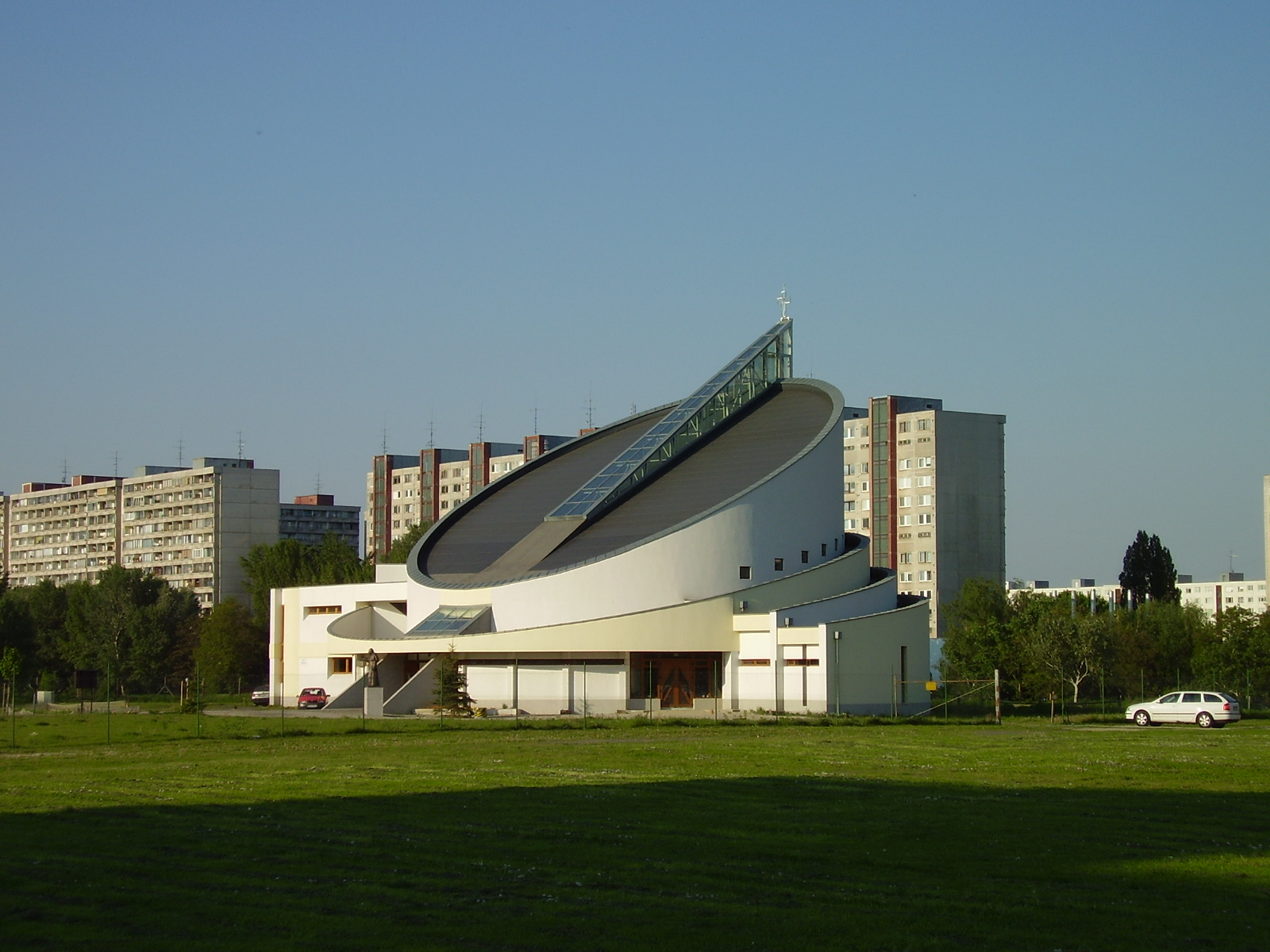
Holy Family Church

Holy Family Church (Slovak: Kostol Svätej rodiny) is a Catholic church in Petržalka, a district of Bratislava.The seating capacity is 448. Construction began in July 2001 and the church was completed in 2003.

The church is located by the Croatian Canal (Slovak: Chorvátske rameno) near the Technopol building complex. It is located in a park where Pope John Paul II celebrated mass in 2003, now known as John Paul II Square (Slovak: Námestie Jána Pavla II.).

In 2003, Pope John Paul II visited the church and celebrated the mass on the space in front of it. Tens of thousands of believers from all around Slovakia and neighbouring countries attended.
