= National parish =

Catholic church serving a particular nationality or ethnicity

A national parish is a type of Catholic parish distinguished by liturgical rites or nationality of the congregation; it is found within a diocese or particular Church, which includes other types of parishes in the same geographical area, each parish being unique. A national parish is distinguished from the commonly known type of parish, the territorial parish, which serves a territory subject to the exclusive jurisdiction of the territorial parish priest. A national parish is an ecclesiastic subdivision which serves a community of people but is not necessarily a geographic subdivision.

== Background ==
National parishes housed in national churches in Rome have existed for centuries to meet the spiritual needs of people both temporarily or permanently residing in Rome and those visiting Rome on pilgrimage. For example, the Church of Santa Susanna served both as a titular church and the national parish for Americans until 2017, when it was replaced by San Patrizio a Villa Ludovisi.

National parishes were first established in North America in the late 18th century, to meet the needs of immigrants not speaking the language of the majority population. The first national parish in North America was Holy Trinity German National Parish, founded in 1788 in Philadelphia, Pennsylvania.

Father Raymond A. Schroth, SJ, wrote in a 2002 National Catholic Reporter article about trusteeism that, "national parishes, particularly German and Polish, who brought over European traditions of the laypeople establishing and directing the parish," have strongly represented the voice of the laity in the church.

The U.S. Conference of Catholic Bishops, when covering Pope Benedict XVI's 2008 visit to the United States, identified two historically significant national parishes: Holy Trinity Church, in Philadelphia, established in 1789 as both the first national parish in the United States and the first to serve German-speaking Catholics; and, Saint Benedict the Moor's Church, in New York, established in 1883 as the first mission parish to serve African-American Catholics north of the Mason–Dixon line.

As city populations changed, sometimes national parishes were merged into one church as population declines caused church closings. For instance, in Little Falls, New York, former national parishes for Italian, Polish and other immigrant groups have been closed. The Catholic community now worships in one church, renamed after the Holy Family. It is the largest physical church and had been founded as St. Patrick's by Irish Catholic immigrants, the first of waves of immigrants to this small city in the 19th and 20th centuries.

In a 2009 National Catholic Reporter article about the resignation of Bishop Joseph Francis Martino of the Diocese of Scranton, Pennsylvania, Jerry Filteau noted the diocese's history of establishing national parishes for Polish people, Italians, Irish and other Catholic immigrant groups who arrived in the late 19th and early 20th centuries. He attributed failure by an earlier Irish-American bishop to be sensitive to the Polish national parish as being the catalyst for the separation of the Polish National Catholic Church in Scranton.

George Gregory wrote in 2010 about the establishment of a new national parish designated for Hispanics in the Philadelphia archdiocese, noting that "national parishes serve particular ethnic communities, as opposed to territorial parishes, which serve a geographic area of an archdiocese or a diocese." He said that the new parish was the 32nd national parish in the Archdiocese of Philadelphia. The parish was established as St. Rocco Parish in Avondale, Pennsylvania, in southern Chester County, where a large number of Latinos have moved in recent years. Parish members are primarily Mexican, but some are Puerto Rican, Colombian, Argentinian, or have other Latin American backgrounds. As of 2010, the Philadelphia archdiocese had "13 Italian parishes, nine Polish parishes, three Slovak parishes, three Lithuanian parishes, two German parishes, and one Korean parish."

== See also ==
- National parishes (Québec)
