= Holy Trinity Church (Philadelphia) =

Former Catholic church in Philadelphia

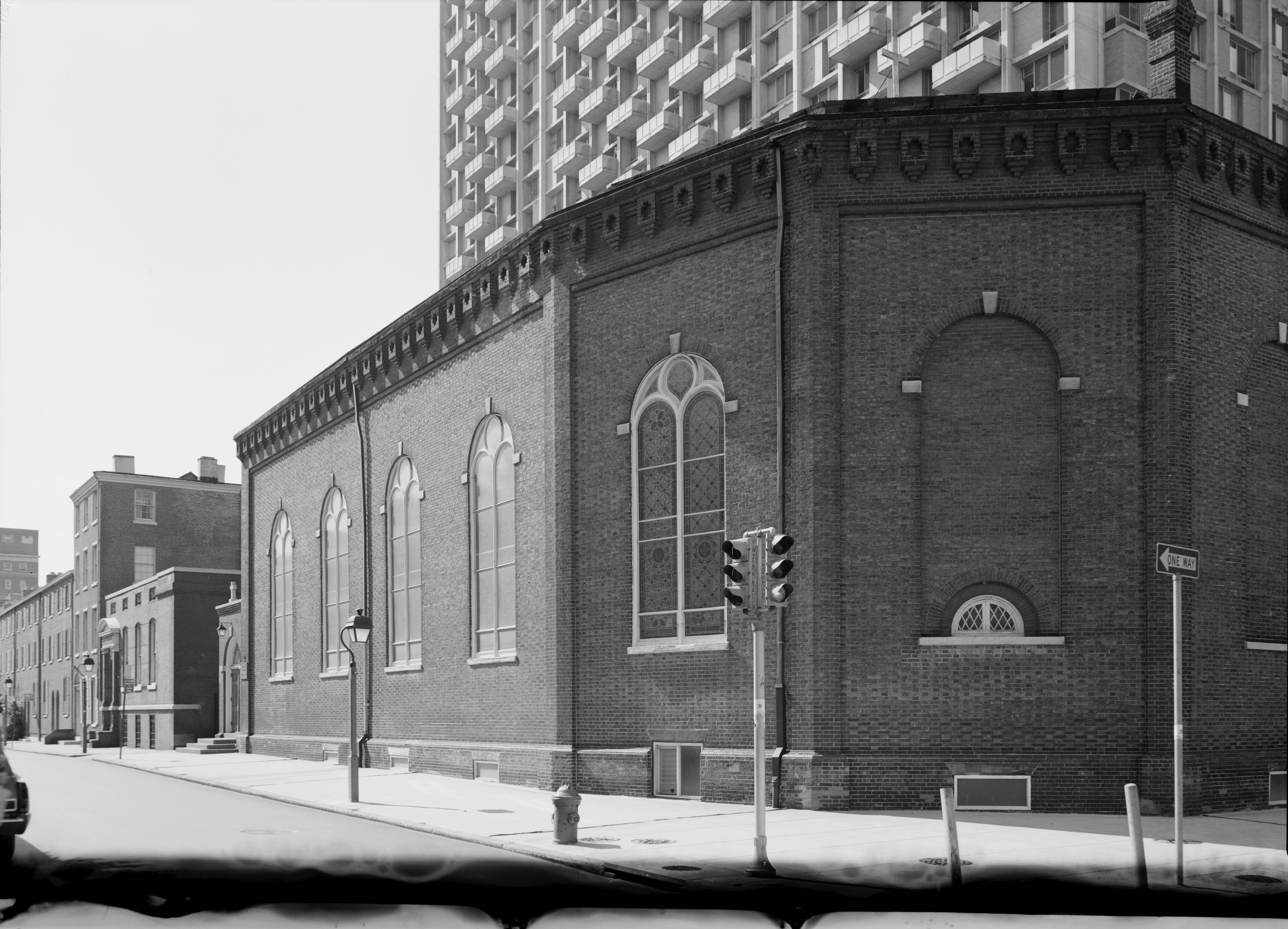
- Photograph by the Historic American Buildings Survey
- Holy Trinity Church
- 39°56′44″N 75°09′07″W
- Location: 256–66 South 6th Street, Philadelphia, Pennsylvania
- Country: United States
- Denomination: Catholic Church
- Website: www.oldstmary.com/holy-trinity-church

History
- Founded: 1784
- Dedication: Holy Trinity

Architecture
- Years built: 1789; 237 years ago
- Closed: 2019; 7 years ago

Administration
- Archdiocese: Archdiocese of Philadelphia
- Parish: St. Mary's Church (post-2009)
- Trinity Roman Catholic Church
- U.S. Historic district – Contributing property
- Philadelphia Register of Historic Places
- Part of: Society Hill (ID71000065)
- Designated PRHP: April 30, 1957

Holy Trinity Church is a historic church building and former parish of the Catholic Church located in the Society Hill neighborhood of Philadelphia, Pennsylvania. Established in 1784, the church was a national parish for Germans and was the first national parish for any ethnicity in the United States. The church merged into a single parish with St. Mary's Church in 2009, and closed in 2019. It is set to be relegated to profane but not sordid use in January 2023.

== History ==
By the 1780s, half of Philadelphia's Catholic population was German, and they asked permission of John Carroll, the Apostolic Prefect of the United States, to build their own church. Holy Trinity Church was founded in 1784 by German-speaking Catholics, and in 1788, Carroll authorized it as a national parish for Germans. It was the first national parish for any ethnicity in the United States, and was the third parish established in the city of Philadelphia, predating the establishment of the Archdiocese of Philadelphia.

The church building was constructed in 1789, and today is nearly identical to how it appeared then. The interior of the church and the roof were destroyed in 1860 by a fire started by a firecracker lit during a Fourth of July celebration. Other alterations were made to the interior over the course of its history.

The parish established an orphanage in 1797 for children orphaned by the yellow fever epidemics, which was the first Catholic orphanage in the United States.

Composer Robert Elmore was church organist from 1938 to 1955.

The church building was inscribed on the Philadelphia Register of Historic Places as "Trinity Roman Catholic Church" on April 30, 1957, and is a contributing property of the Society Hill historic district. The exterior cannot be altered without the approval of the Philadelphia Historical Commission. The church was also documented by the Historic American Buildings Survey of the National Park Service.

There is a small cemetery in Holy Trinity's churchyard, which is also historically protected. The cemetery inspired the final scene in Henry Wadsworth Longfellow's poem Evangeline.

=== Merger with Old St. Mary's Church ===
In the 21st century, the number of parishioners declined because of the church's proximity to two nearby Catholic churches, Old St. Joseph's Church and Old St. Mary's Church, and the area no longer contains a significant German-speaking Catholic population. The church merged into the parish of Old St. Mary's Church on July 1, 2009.

After the merger, the church was infrequently used because of the poor condition of the roof and floors. Masses were celebrated on holy days other than solemnities, and from July 2013 to May 2015, Traditional Latin Masses were celebrated there. The last Mass was celebrated inside the church in 2017. In 2019, the cost to repair the building and install a new air conditioning and heating system was projected to be between $800,000 and $1 million, which Old St. Mary's Church deemed would pose a financial strain, in light of a small number of congregants at Holy Trinity Church.

On July 25, 2019, the Archbishop of Philadelphia, Charles Chaput, decreed that effective September 3, the church would be relegated to profane but not sordid use, meaning that it would be closed as a place of worship and that St. Mary's Church would be permitted to sell it. On August 26, Archbishop Chaput delayed the implementation of that decree to November 12. On April 30, 2022, his successor, Archbishop Nelson J. Perez, withdrew the decree to relegate the church. On December 11, 2022, Archbishop Perez, decreed that, effective January 23, 2023, Holy Trinity Church would be relegated to profane but not sordid use.
