= Holy Family Church, School, and Rectory =

Historic church in South Dakota, United States

- U.S. National Register of Historic Places
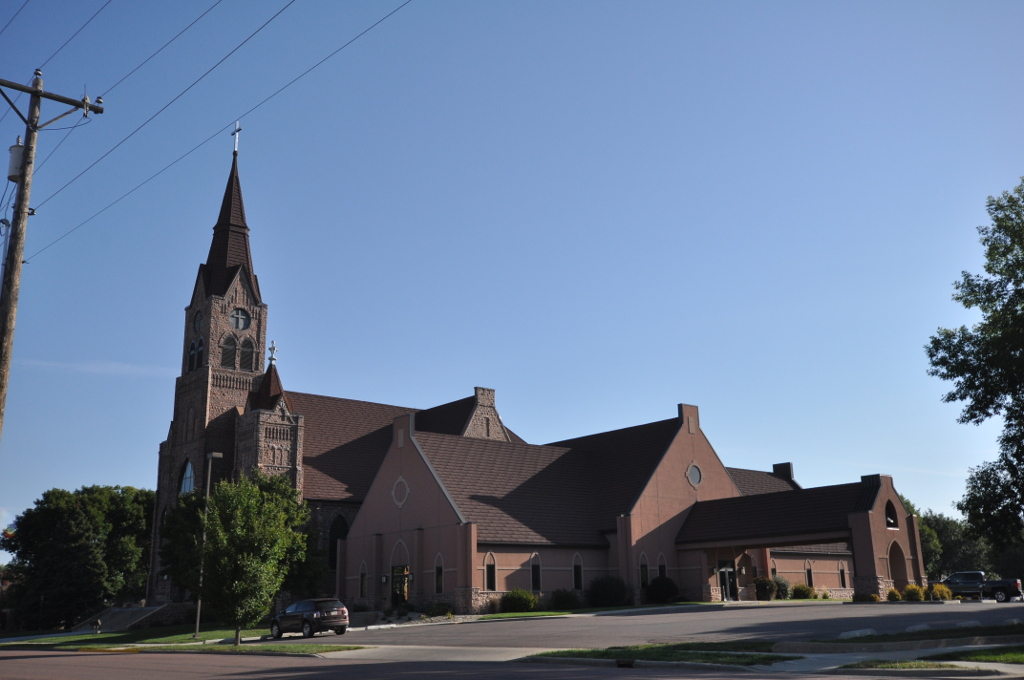

- Location within South Dakota Location within the United States
- Location: Kimball and Davison Sts., E. 2nd and E. 3rd Aves., Mitchell, South Dakota
- Coordinates: 43°42′40″N 98°1′18″W
- Area: 3.6 acres (1.5 ha)
- Built: 1906, 1912, 1921
- Architectural style: Gothic, Tudor Revival, Jacobethan, English Medieval
- NRHP reference No.: 76001729
- Added to NRHP: December 12, 1976

The Holy Family Church, School, and Rectory in Mitchell, South Dakota is a historic church complex at Kimball and Davison Sts., E. 2nd and E. 3rd Avenues. It was built in 1906, 1912, and 1921 and was added to the National Register of Historic Places in 1976.

The church was built in 1906 at cost of $100,000. The school, at cost of $150,000, was opened as Notre Dame Academy in 1912. The rectory was built in 1921 for $30,000.
