= Holy Family Syro-Malabar Church, Mannila =

Catholic church in Kerala, India

Coordinates: 9.466667°N 76.55°E

Holy Family Church Mannila is a Catholic church located in Kottayam district in the Indian state of Kerala, about 10 kilometers away from Changanacherry; the Church is part of the Archdiocese of Changanacherry. It was established in 1927. That year a cross was erected on Mannilakunnu – മാന്നിലക്കുന്ന് (a small hill area around 10 km from Changanachery) by Fr. Karingida Thomma with the help of members of Marthoma Dasa Sangham, a Christian youth organisation. This was the beginning of The Holy Family Church Mannila.

Through co-operative effort, an official church was constructed in 1940. Construction of the present church, on the site of the old church, began 51 years later and was completed in 1995. Marthoma Dasa Sangham played an important role in the formation of Mannila church. The organisation was founded by H. E. Mar Thomas Kurialassery in 1919. Mar Thomas Kurialassery arranged training for Marthoma Dasa Sangham members at Parel minor seminary, Changanacherry.

Rev Fr. Dominic Thottassery was the first president of Marthoma Dasa Sangham. They conducted prayers in remote areas and taught catechism to the people in Mannila, which created a holy atmosphere at Mannilakunnu.

== History ==
Mar Thomas Kurialassery became the Bishop of Changanacherry Diocese in 1911. He selected a group of young people to conduct prayers in remote areas and teach catechism to the people. They conducted prayers in places where there were no churches. Mar Thomas Kurialassery also made a by-law for their activities and named them as "Marthommadasasangham – മാർത്തോമ്മാദാസസംഘം". He also arranged training for "Marthommadasasangham" members at Parel minor Seminary Changanacherry. Fr.Dominic Thottassery was the first president of Marthommadasasangham. Thrikodithanam, Mannila, Kurumpanadam and Payipadu were the main functional areas. Changanacherry Cathedral Church and Kurumpanadam church were the main centres of Marthommadasasangham at that time.

Karingida Thomma became the vicar of Kurumpanadam church. He assembled a group of people and moved to Mannilakunnu through the forest road via Parakada. There he erected a cross with the help of Marthommadasasangham members. Many people gathered at Mannilakunnu and prayed there. A shed was erected and Palakunnel Ninan Saviour donated a model of the Holy Family that was placed inside. Prayers began in Mannilakunnu every Wednesday. People from remote areas, including Kuttanadu, came to Mannilakunnu to conduct prayers. They gave money to the Holy Family as "Nercha". Marthommadasasangham gave money to the Kurumpanadam church for mission works. After it was built, the shed was under the control of Marthommadasasangham. The Changanacherry revenue officers gave the land to Marthommadasasangham as "Danapathippu". Marthommadasasangham paid the tax for the land. Kalyamkandam Thommachen, Moolayil Cheriyachen, Moolayil Kunjachen, K.J Joseph Kochukalayamkandam, Muriyankavunkal Joseph Sir, Thyparampil Chacko Sir, Koovakattu Thommachy, Kuttuvelil Kunjappen were the prominent members of the Marthommadasasangham during that time.

In 1940, Thackenkery Varghese became vicar. The shed at Mannilakunnu was replaced and a new church was built. Palakunnel Ninan Saviour gave a "Althara" to Mannila church. When Kocheri Cyriac became vicar, he started holding Mass at Mannilakunnu every Sunday.

In 1972, then Archbishop of Changanacherry, Mar Antony Padiyara declared Mannila an Independent Church. Mathew Kallukalam became the first vicar of Mannila Holy Family Church. At that time a youth organisation called Mannila Youth Organisation was developed in Mannila. In 1982 a parish hall was built, while Mathew Kiliroor was vicar. On 21 June 1982 an ASMI convent was established. On 10 February 1991, the foundation stone for the new church was laid at Mannila by Archbishop Mar Joseph Powathil. On 5 November 1995 the new church was blessed by Powathil, while Joseph Vaniyapurakkal was vicar. In 2014 Thomas Thekkekara was vicar. In 2023, Rev. Fr. Antony Nereyath was the vicar.
