= Church of the Holy Family (Staten Island) =

Roman Catholic church in New York City

Coordinates: 40°36′58.7″N 74°8′29.34″W

The Church of the Holy Family
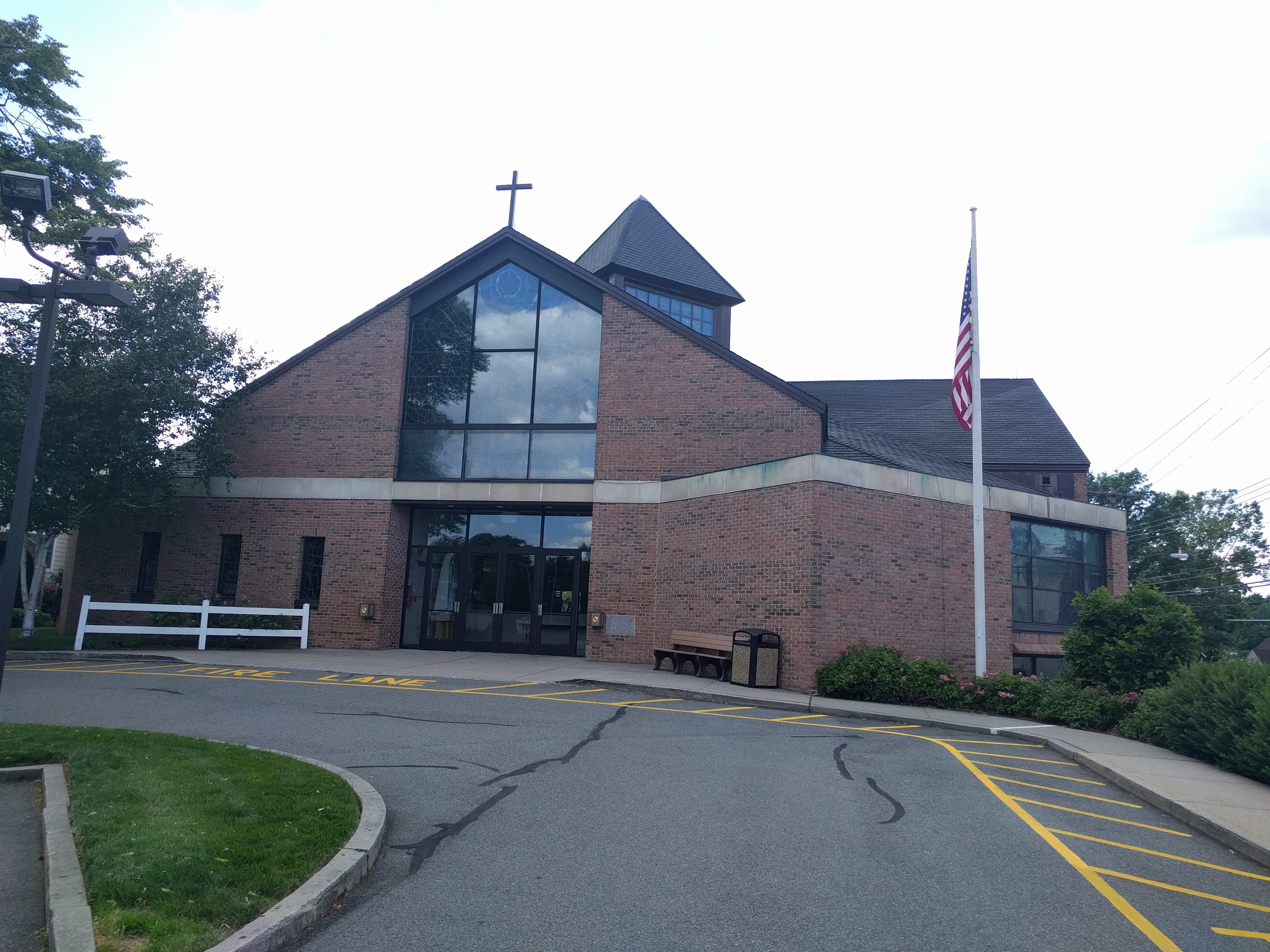
- Interactive map of the The Church of the Holy Family area

General information
- Location: Staten Island, New York, United States of America
- Completed: 1990
- Client: Roman Catholic Archdiocese of New York

The Church of the Holy Family is a Roman Catholic parish church under the authority of the Roman Catholic Archdiocese of New York, located at 366 Watchogue Road Westerleigh Staten Island, New York City. The parish was founded in 1966, a parish center was built in 1968 containing a chapel and school, and a parish church was completed in 1990.
