= Holy Family Catholic Church (Philadelphia) =

Church building in United States

Coordinates: 40.03274°N 75.22855°W

Holy Family Catholic Church is a Roman Catholic Church located at 234 Hermitage Street in the Roxborough section of Philadelphia.

== Holy Family parish ==
The parish of Holy Family was founded in 1885 and its boundary extends from Livezey Lane from Ridge Avenue to Valley Avenue; to air line to Wissahickon Creek; to Green Lane; to Schuylkill River; to Paoli Avenue; to Ridge Avenue; to Livezey Lane.

== Parish school ==
A parish school is located next to the church. Children from the parish and from St. Josaphat parish attend primary grades. The grade school now operates as a daycare center.
