= Church of the Holy Family (Agoura Hills, California) =

Catholic church in Agoura, California, United States

Coordinates: 34.112062°N 118.785292°W

Holy Family is a private, independent traditionalist Catholic chapel located behind a guarded gate at 30188 W. Mulholland Highway, Agoura, California, United States. It is not affiliated with the Archdiocese of Los Angeles. Its 70 or so members are traditional Catholics, including some that hold a sedevacantist position. They reject many or all of the reforms introduced by the Second Vatican Council and worship according to Catholic Roman Rites including the Tridentine Mass.

The chapel is supported by the non-profit A.P. Reilly Foundation, which is funded by actor/director Mel Gibson. According to 2008 IRS filings, the foundation's assets, including real property, total $42 million.
