= Coldham Cottage =

- Church of Our Lady Immaculate and St Joseph
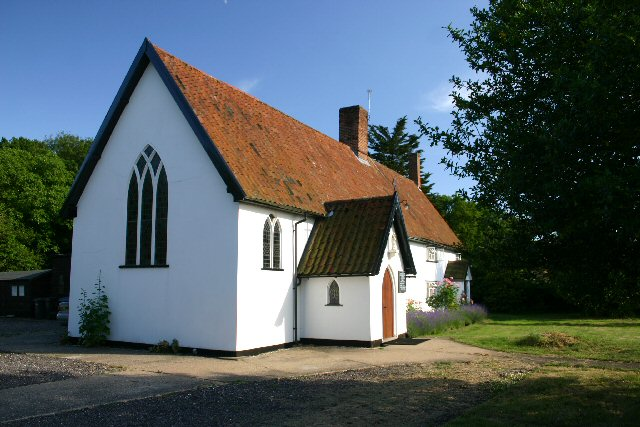
- Church of Our Lady Immaculate and St Joseph - known as Coldham Cottage

- Location within Suffolk
- 52.1700°N 0.7148°E
- Location: Bury Road, Lawshall, Suffolk
- Country: England
- Denomination: Roman Catholic

Administration
- Diocese: Roman Catholic Diocese of East Anglia

The Church of Our Lady Immaculate and St Joseph, otherwise known as Coldham Cottage is the oldest continuing Roman Catholic church in Suffolk. It is in Bury Road, Lawshall and is part of the Diocese of East Anglia. It is in the Catholic parish of Bury St Edmunds. In 1998, it was designated as a Grade II Listed Building.

The church is located in Bury Road near the entrance to Coldham Hall. From the time of the Reformation the history of the Catholic Mission had been closely linked to the Rookwood family and Coldham Hall. The hall itself is in the neighbouring parish of Stanningfield but the main entrance gatehouse, the avenue and the present church are in Lawshall.

== History ==
The Rookwoods who had been in the area since 1315, built a magnificent house in 1574 and pulled down their former residence. The new house was constructed with its "built-in" secret attic chapel, its hiding hole and escape down a chimney with an outer wall.

Four years after the completion of the hall Queen Elizabeth I paid her visit to Lawshall. Efforts were made by the Rookwoods to persuade her to visit them at the hall but these were rewarded by one of the family being thrown in prison in Bury St Edmunds where he later died. The disturbances between the Roman Catholics and Protestants probably touched the village in many ways. The tale of fines and confiscations can be followed in the Rookwood records. During these difficult times the priests sometimes stayed at Coldham Hall but their names were not recorded for security.

Sometime during the late sixteenth century or early seventeenth century the attic chapel was no longer used for religious purposes. Another place was used for Mass, buried in the woods and surrounded by a moat. This second chapel was at a house named Barfords, and the building, with the remains of the chapel, survives. At about this time the Rookwoods were linked with the Gage family at Hengrave Hall when Sir Thomas Gage took over Coldham Hall from his mother, who was a Rookwood. His brother Fr. John Gage nearly brought the Coldham mission to an end by arranging for many people to travel to his new church in Bury St Edmunds. In an attempt to stop the drop in communicants at the beginning of the nineteenth century a third chapel was built at Coldham Hall. It is still there but no longer used for services.

In 1865, when Fr. Patrick Rogers was priest, new challenges arose when Coldham Hall was sold because of financial difficulties. Mass was said at Barfords once again until 1870, when the presbytery at Coldham Cottage was adapted and extended to form the present church. At about this time the Catholic school was moved to a site adjacent to the new church.

Coldham Cottage itself dates from the late seventeenth/early eighteenth century and has a timber-frame, whitewashed and rendered, with pantile roof and brick central ridge and right end projecting stacks. A separate church was created utilising one unit of the existing house (kitchen and bedroom with removal of floor) and building on an extension. The whole represents an unusual and rare instance of continuing Catholic use from at least the eighteenth century.

Following renovation work to the cottage, there is now a resident priest as well as facility to provide holiday accommodation for clergy wanting to take time off from their own parishes. The present church is now the oldest Roman Catholic Mission in Suffolk.

== See also ==
- Catholic Church in England
