= Saint Philomena's Church (Lansdowne, Pennsylvania) =

Catholic church in Lansdowne, Pennsylvania

St. Philomena Church
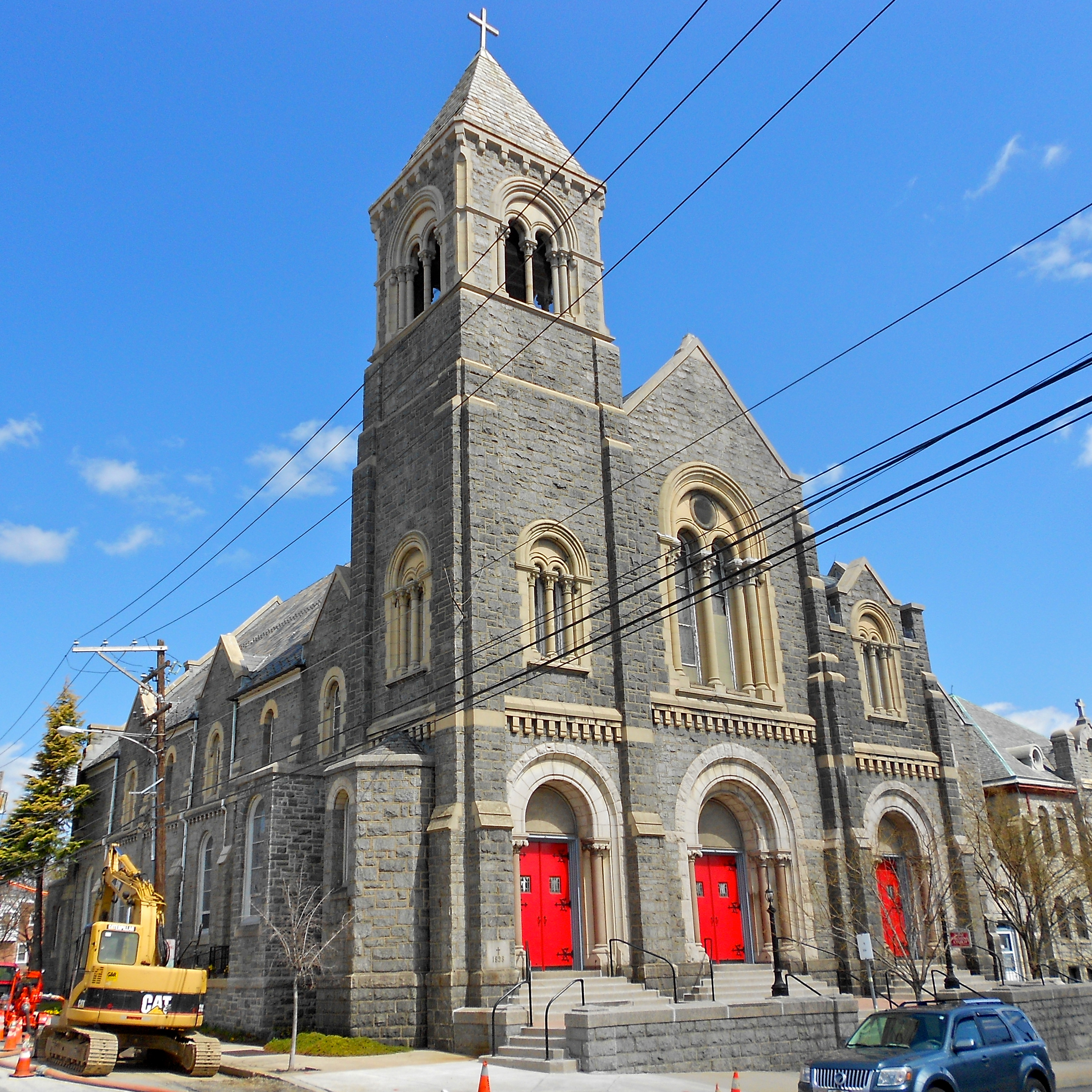
- Exterior of church in 2015

- Location of St. Philomena Church in Pennsylvania
- 39.9393°N 75.2707°W
- Address: 41 E Baltimore Ave Lansdowne, Pennsylvania 19050
- Country: United States
- Denomination: Roman Catholic
- Tradition: Roman Rite (Ecclesiastical)
- Website: www.stphilspa.com

History
- Dedication: Saint Philomena
- Dedicated: May 27, 1900

Architecture
- Architectural type: Romanesque
- Years built: 1898–1899; 1924–1925

Administration
- Archdiocese: Archdiocese of Philadelphia
- Deanery: Episcopal Region I – Delaware County East

The St. Philomena Church is a Roman Catholic church located in Lansdowne, Pennsylvania.

== History ==
Beginning construction in 1898, the cornerstone for the church's foundation was laid on December 4 of that year. The local congregation, who had been meeting in a rented space at the Lansdowne Hall, held a service in the rain led by Bishop Edmond Francis Prendergast as the cornerstone was laid. The church was completed for the most part by 1899, although would undergo various major renovations and roof raisings throughout the early 20th century.

The church was dedicated to Saint Philomena on May 27, 1900. Rev. Francis J. Markee was the rector at its founding. In 1902, planning began to construct a parochial school for the congregation under lead of Philadelphia architect Rowland W. Boyle (d. 1911). Construction began in 1906, and it was officially dedicated on September 22, 1907, by Archbishop Patrick John Ryan.

In 1924, the church rectory began plans for expansion after a donation of $70,000 ($1,315,049 USD in 2025) by Philadelphia businessman Thomas Fitzgerald. In 1925, the church's convent caught fire and burned to the ground. Later in the year, the final touches on the main building were completed. The convent was fully restored and blessed by Bishop J. Carroll McCormick in 1950. Minor repairs were made in 1990 after a drunk driver crashed his car into the steps leading up to the church. 2 months later, a gas explosion damaged the church's lower school, injuring one person.

For the first 45 years of its existence, St. Philomena's pastor was Francis J. Markee (1855–1943), who served until his death in June 1943. Rev. A. Paul Lambert succeeded him as priest in July 1943.

In 1998, the church celebrated its Centenary Jubilee, holding a triathlon extending to the shore of New Jersey.

In October 2021, the SS Cyril Catholic school merged with Saint Philomena into one Catholic school following the closure of the St. Cyril of Alexandria parish, whose congregation had merged with St. Philomena's in 2013.

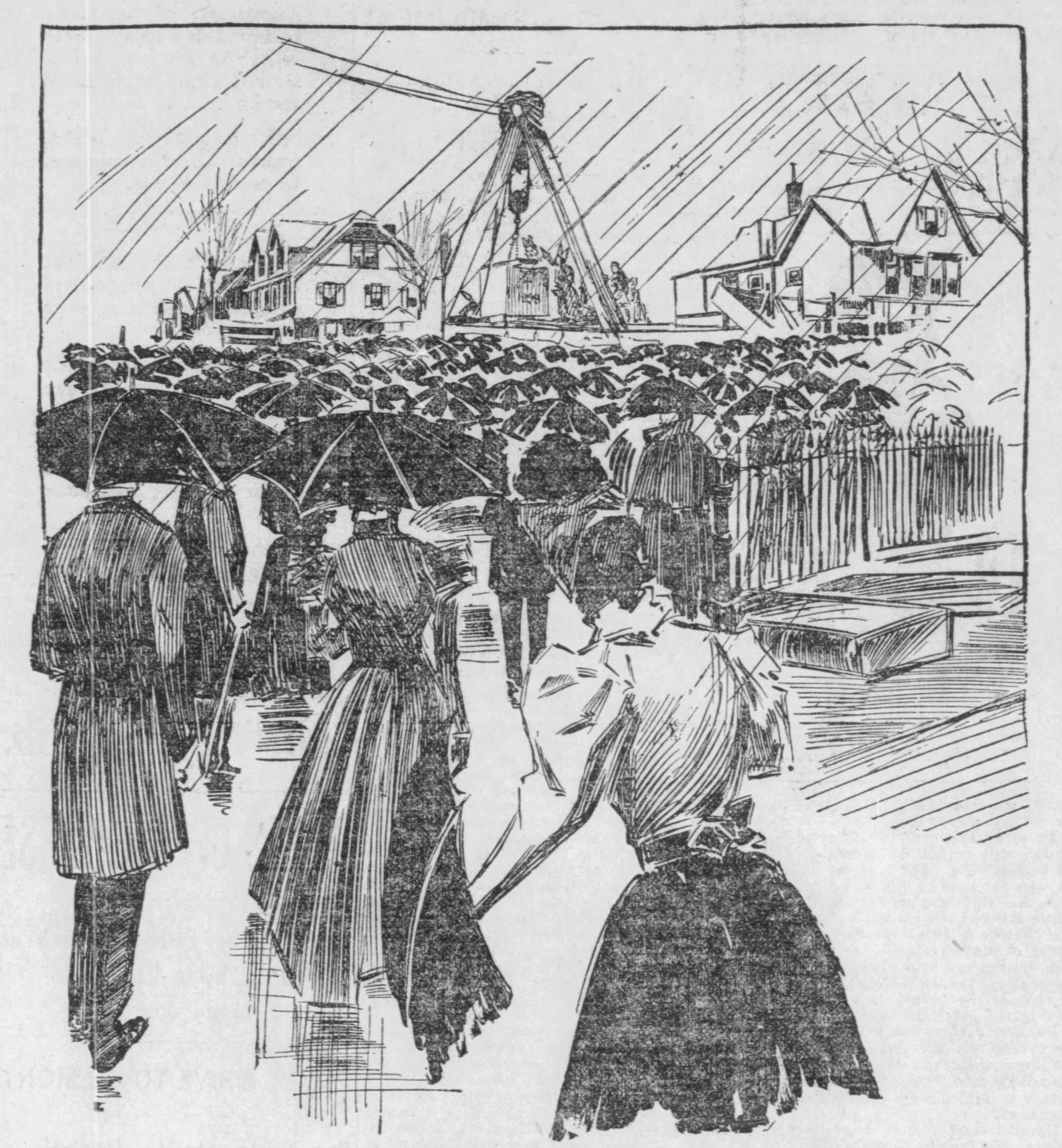
Depiction of Cornerstone ceremony in the Philadelphia Inquirer, 1898

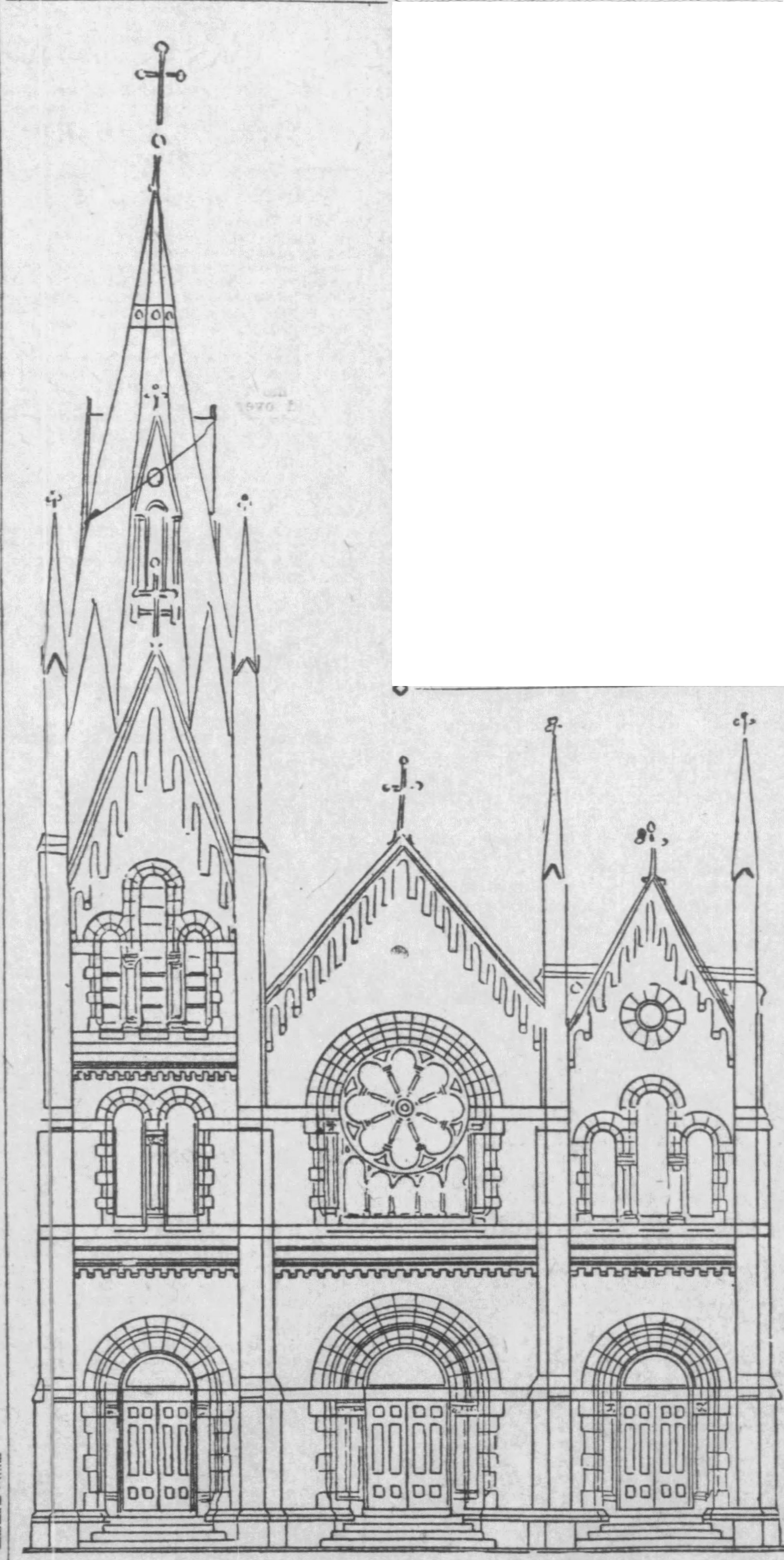
Original blueprint design for edifice of church, 1898

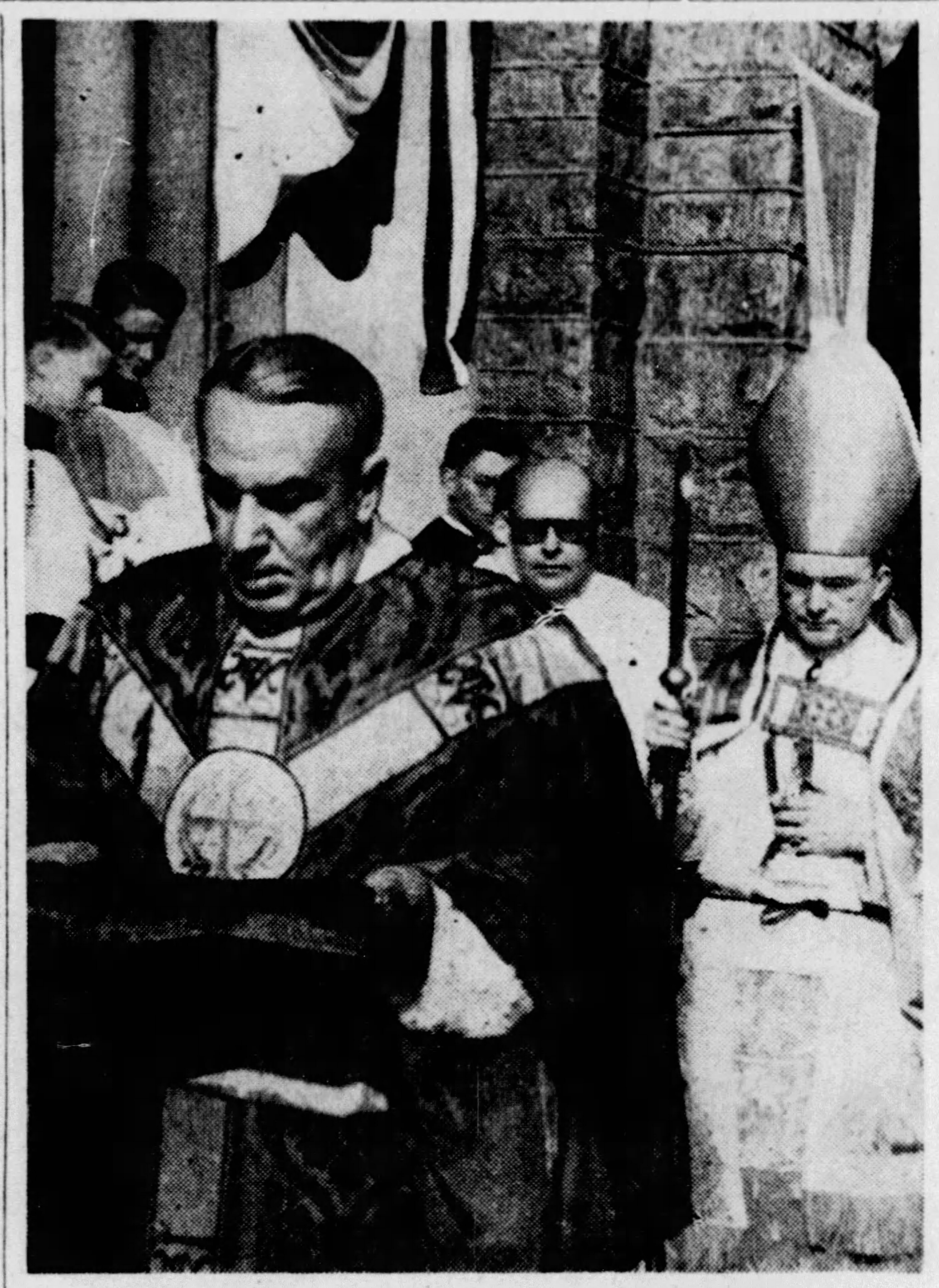
Rev. A. Paul Lambert and Bishop J. Carroll McCormick celebrating Golden Jubilee of St. Philomena, 1948
