= Holy Family Church (North Chicago, Illinois) =

Historic church in Illinois, United States

- U.S. National Register of Historic Places
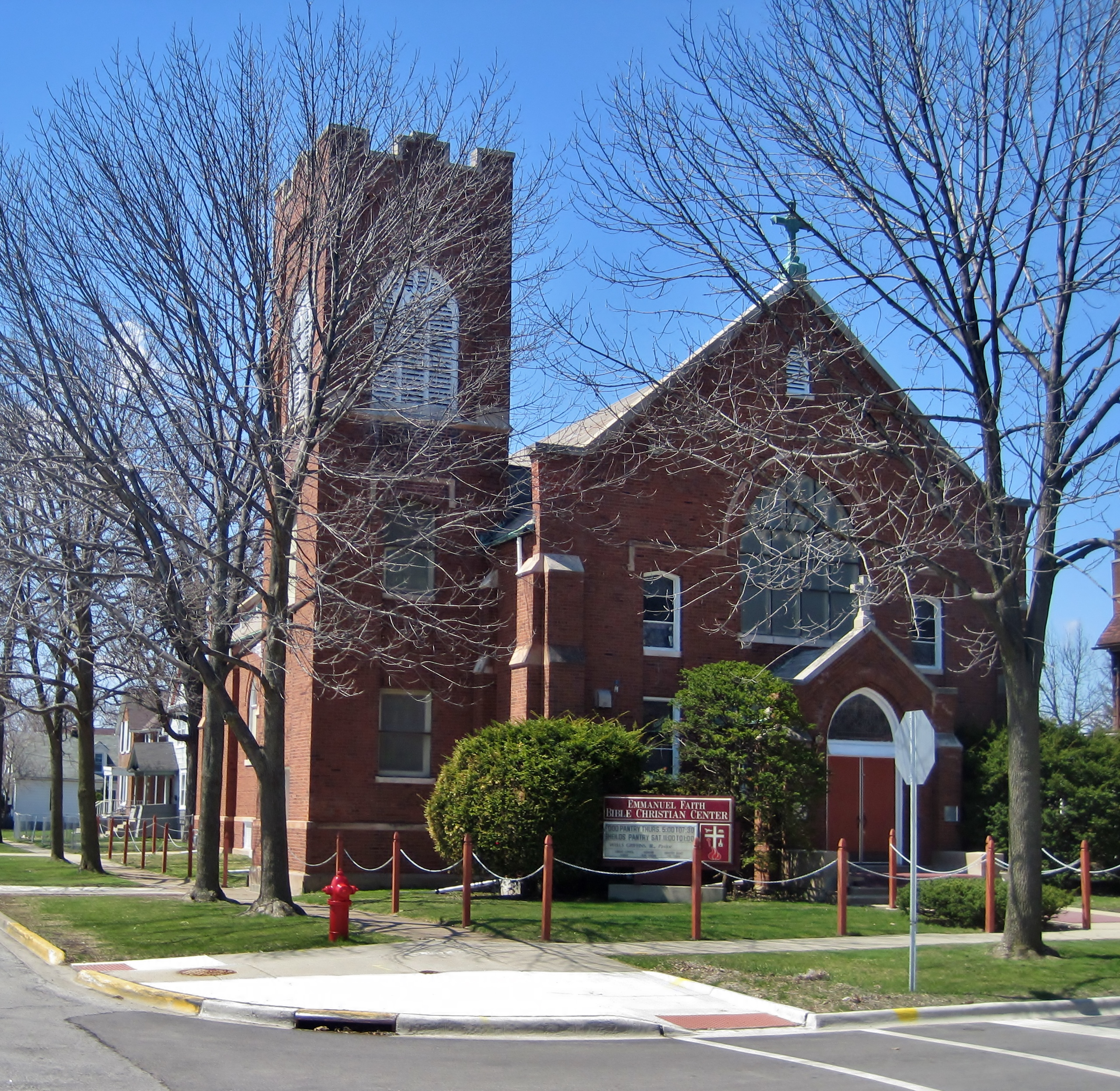

- Location within Illinois Location within the United States
- Location: 1840 Lincoln St., North Chicago, Illinois
- Coordinates: 42°19′30″N 87°50′34″W
- Area: less than one acre
- Built: 1914-15
- Built by: Bajorek, Joseph
- Architect: Gubbins, William F.
- Architectural style: Late Gothic Revival
- NRHP reference No.: 03000780
- Added to NRHP: August 21, 2003

Holy Family Church is a historic church at 1840 Lincoln Street in North Chicago, Illinois. The church was built in 1914–15 for North Chicago's Roman Catholic congregation, which was formed in 1901. Architect William F. Gubbins designed the Late Gothic Revival church. The church's design includes a front-facing gable with a large stained glass window, pointed arch windows, and a square bell tower with large louvered windows, all typical features of Gothic Revival architecture. The Catholic congregation used the church until 1991; it is now occupied by the Emmanuel Faith Bible Christian Center.

The church was added to the National Register of Historic Places on August 21, 2003.
