= Church of the Holy Family (Eveleth, Minnesota) =

Historic church building in Minnesota, US

- Church of the Holy Family (Catholic)
- U.S. National Register of Historic Places
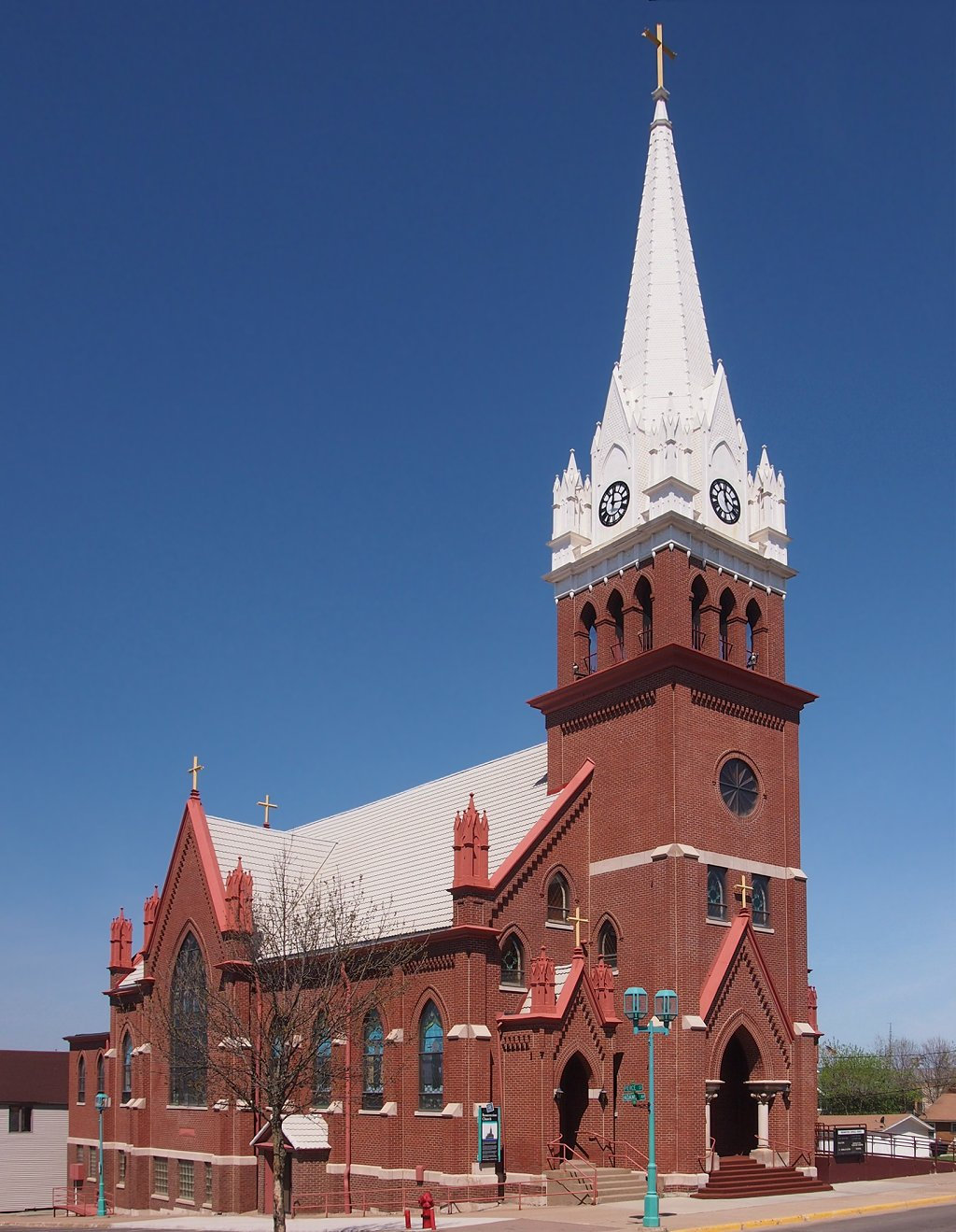
- Church of the Holy Family from the southeast

- Location within Minnesota Location within the United States
- Location: 307 Adams Avenue, Eveleth, Minnesota
- Coordinates: 47°27′45.5″N 92°32′18″W
- Area: Less than one acre
- Built: 1909
- Architect: A.F. Wasielewski
- Architectural style: Gothic Revival
- NRHP reference No.: 80004345
- Added to NRHP: August 27, 1980

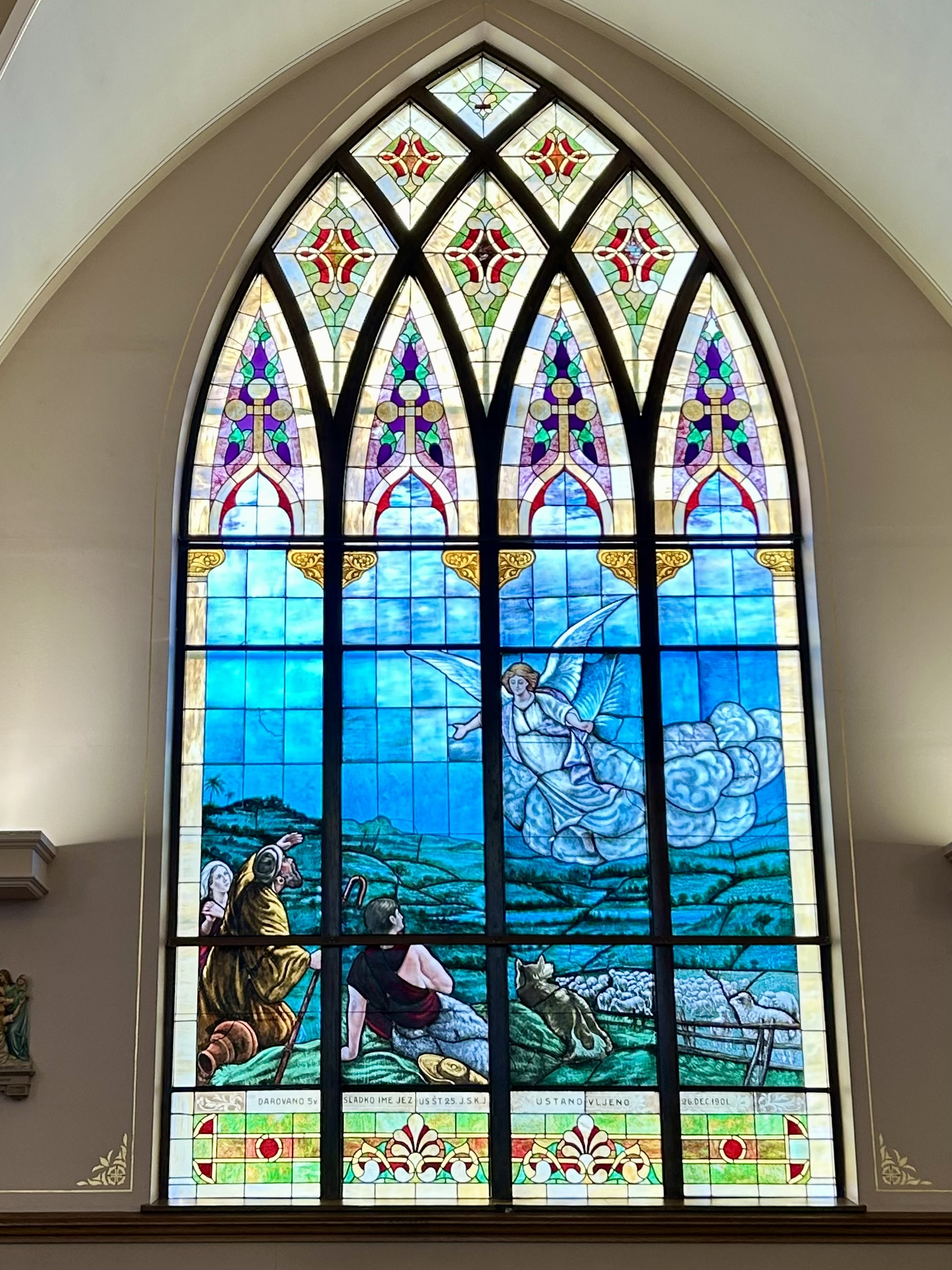
Stained Glass Window, Resurrection Church

The Church of the Holy Family is a historic Roman Catholic church building in Eveleth, Minnesota, United States. It was built in 1909 by a Slovene American congregation and anchored its ethnic community for seventy years. The building was listed on the National Register of Historic Places in 1980 for its local significance in the themes of religion and social history. It was nominated for serving as a long-time community anchor for one of Eveleth's major ethnic groups.

Eveleth's three ethnic Roman Catholic parishes merged in the late 20th century, first with the historically Irish St. Patrick's church joining the Holy Family congregation in 1968. Ten years later, with the addition of the historically Italian congregation from Immaculate Conception church, Holy Family was renamed Resurrection Church.

== See also ==
- List of Catholic churches in the United States
- National Register of Historic Places listings in St. Louis County, Minnesota
