= The Street, Lawshall =

Coordinates: 52.1548°N 0.7279°E

The Street
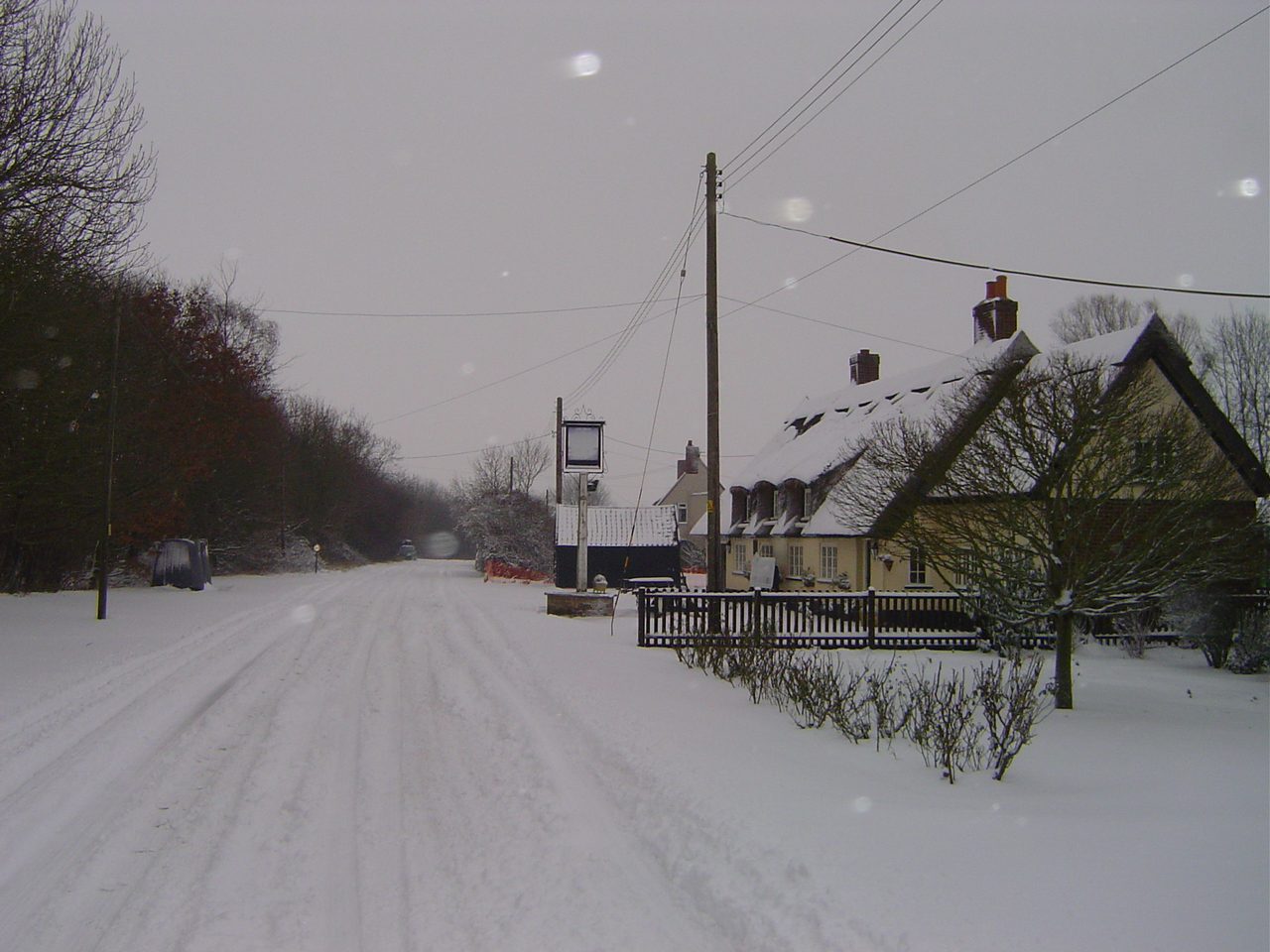
- The Street, Lawshall during a winter snow-storm

- Location within Suffolk
- District: Babergh
- Shire county: Suffolk
- Region: East
- Country: England
- Sovereign state: United Kingdom
- Post town: Bury St Edmunds
- Postcode district: IP29

The Street is a linear settlement in the civil parish of Lawshall in the Babergh district in the county of Suffolk, England. It extends from Lawshall Hall in the west to Donkey Lane in the east. The settlement includes Swanfield, east of the Swan Public House and the small residential development of Hall Mead which is opposite All Saints Church.

The Street is located between Harrow Green and Hanningfield Green and is just over one mile off the A134 between Bury St Edmunds and Sudbury.

== Previous names ==
The Street was known as Church Street in the 1567 Lawshall Survey. At that time there was a track known as The Parson's Way from The Street to the Bury Road at Hill's Farm. There was also a track from Lawshall Hall to Carpenters Cottage (previously a public house) in Donkey Lane.

== History ==
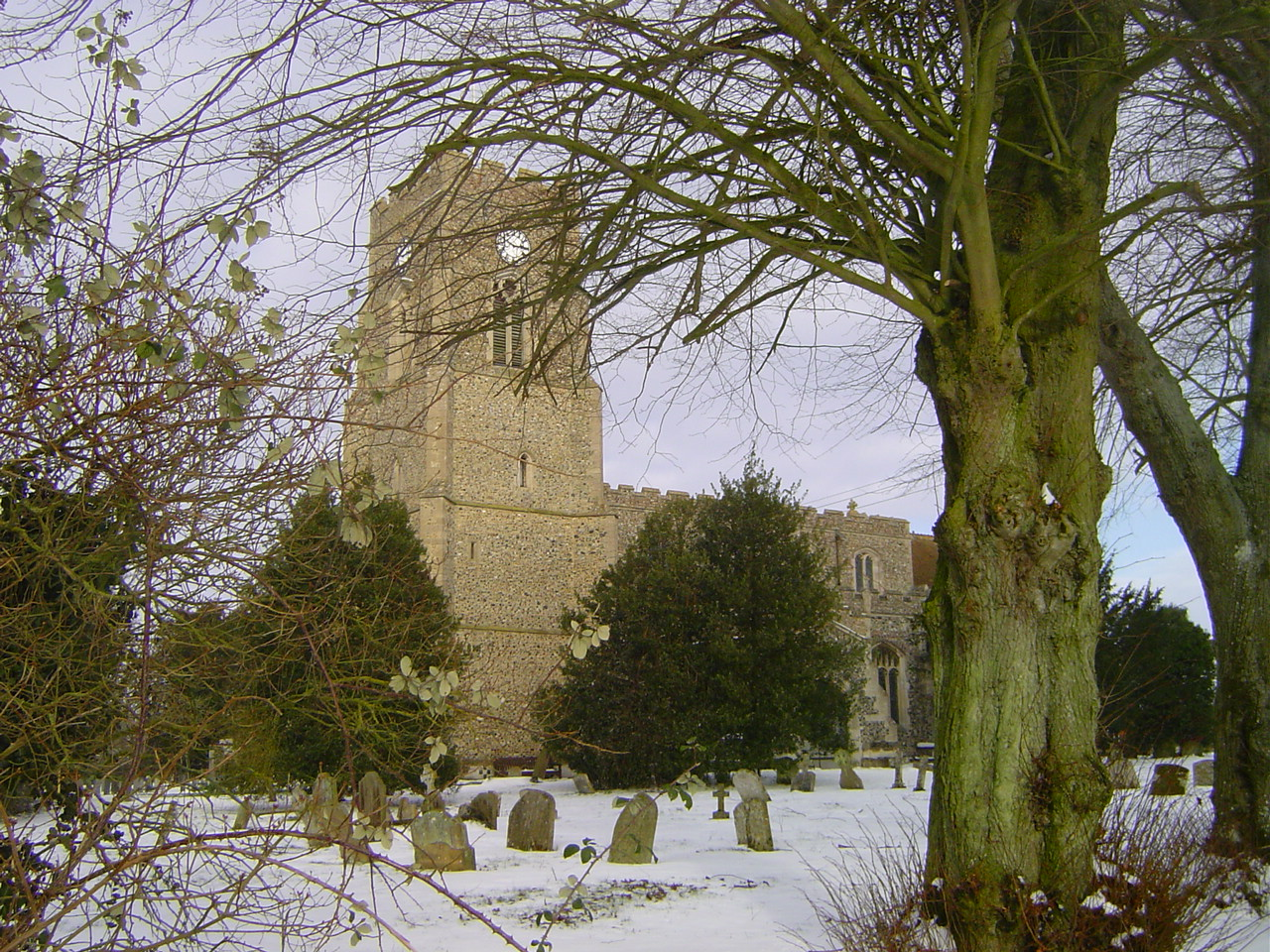
All Saints Church in winter

=== All Saints Church ===
This 15th-century flint church is a Grade I listed building with stone dressings comprising a tall west tower, nave, aisles and a nineteenth-century chancel. The first record of the church was in the Domesday Book although it is not necessarily the church that is visible today. The earliest one that can be dated is in the Early English period c.1166-1266, the chancel and possibly the east windows being of this period. The church was almost completely rebuilt in the mid-15th century on the profits of the cloth industry, and became a vast preaching house after the Reformation.

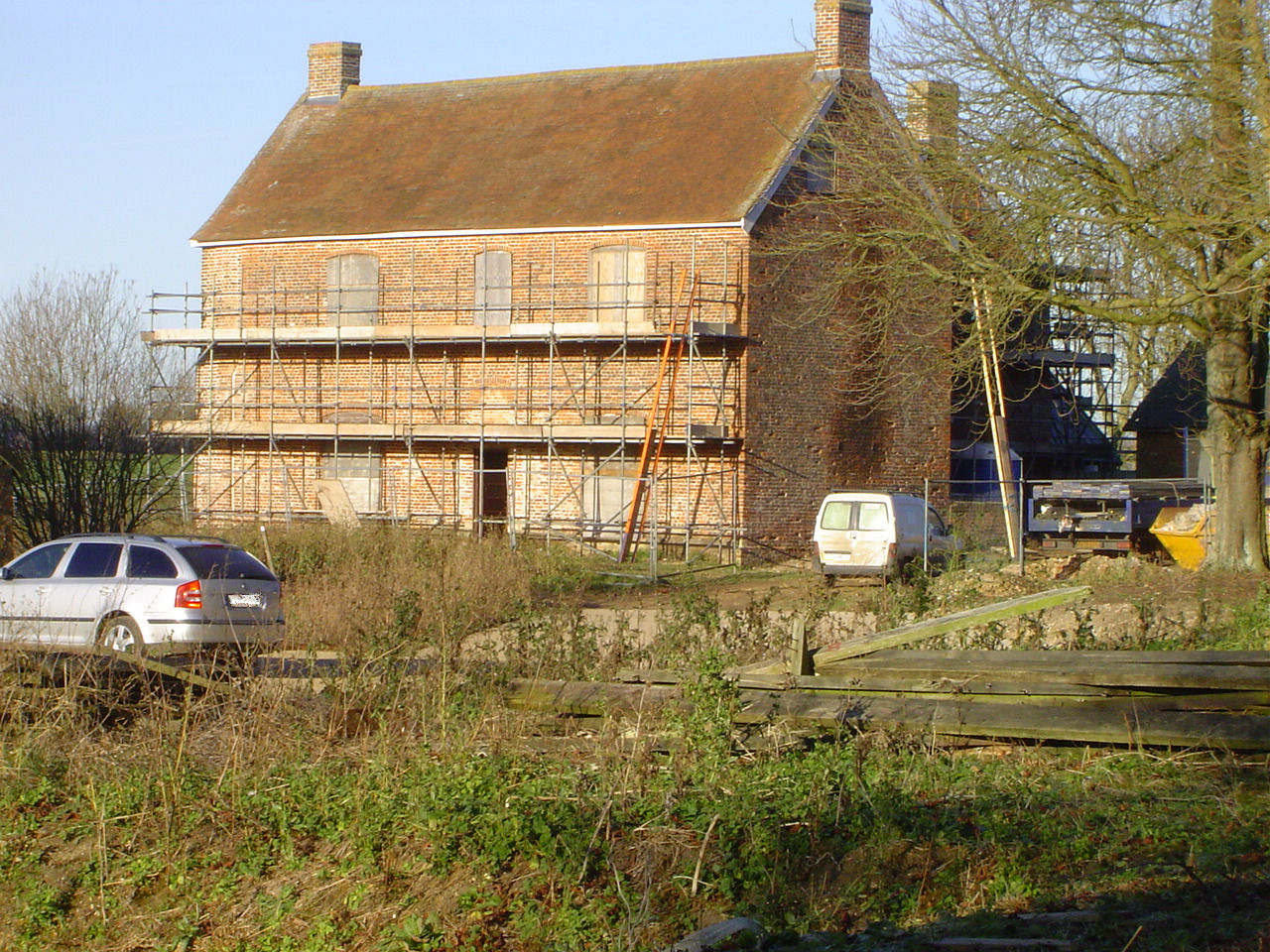
Lawshall Hall

=== Lawshall Hall ===
Lawshall Hall is a mid-16th-century red brick house with some blue brick diapering, built on a T-shaped plan, with the older wing extending north-west. The house may have been part of an old monastery and has massive brick walls approximately 6 feet thick in places. Part of the original wall is apparent at the north-west end of the front wing, with 2 small stone framed windows and a Tudor arched doorway. The house has been greatly altered and was refronted on the south-west elevation in the 19th century with 3 window range of double-hung sashes. The north-east wing has some original mullioned and transomed windows but has been partly blocked. The roof was tiled in the 20th century. The house is dated 1557 with the arms of the Drury's. Queen Elizabeth I visited Henry Drury at Lawshall Hall during her "Royal Progress" tour in August 1578.

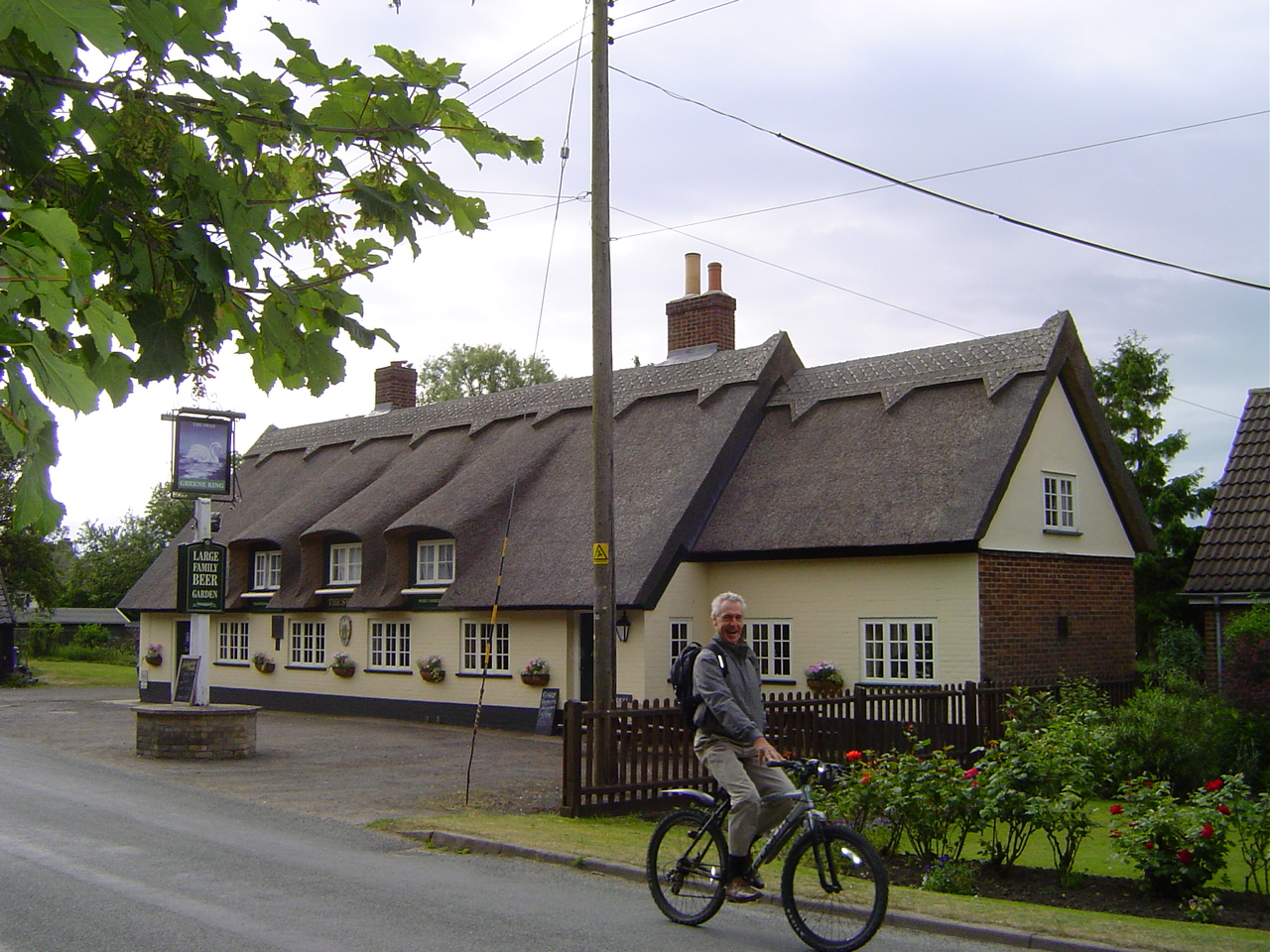
Lawshall Swan Public House

=== Swan Inn ===
The Swan Inn is an 18th-century timber-framed and plastered building, previously with an L-shaped plan with a front extension at right angles to the road. This front extension was demolished in 1968 when the building was renovated. The roof is thatched with three dormers.

There are coins nailed to the underside of the timber beams in the public bar. It was the custom of soldiers during the Great War to nail up coins in this way and to reclaim them upon their return. Alas many of the coins were not reclaimed reflecting the loss of 24 men from the village.

It is not possible to provide a complete list of all the publicans (and residents) of the Swan or the verified dates when they took over or left the public house. However, with reference to the Official Census, White's Directory, Post Office Directory and other sources the following list is provided:

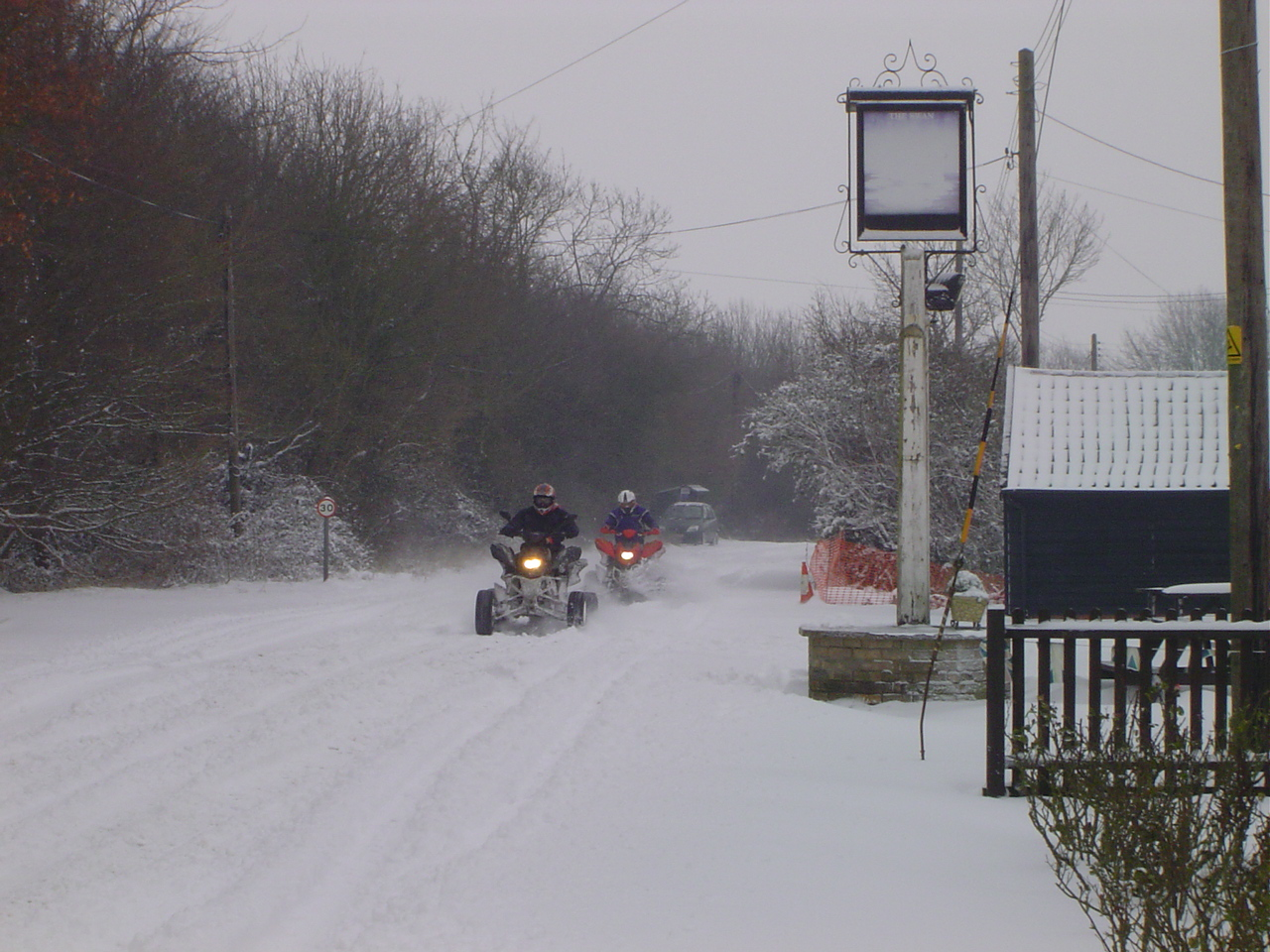
The Lawshall Swan sign in a snow-storm.

Year(s) -	Publicans (and residents)
1825	John Last
1844-61	John Russell
1865-81	William Windred
1888-91	Louisa Windred
1892	Jesse Debenham

Year(s) -	Publicans (and residents)
1900-01	Joseph Hale
1911-22	Walter Cornish
1981	Jim Mapston
1991	Jim & Hazel Leggett
2003	Roy & Bernice Tooke

=== Former facilities ===
Lawshall had its own workhouse which was located in The Street east of All Saints Church. In 1776 it was recorded as having 20 inmates. On 2 June 1790 the Bury and Norwich Post reported that Sarah Allen and her accomplice Ann Flower were committed to the new Bridewell (the house of correction at Bury St Edmunds) by J.Plampin for setting fire to the workhouse at Lawshall.

From 19th century press reports it is clear that Lawshall had its own fire appliance. For example, on 11 April 1843 the Bury and Norwich Post reported that a fire broke out at Place Farm in Hartest and the engines from Chadacre and Lawshall attended. The farm dwelling house was saved but two thatched cottages were destroyed. In another arson incident the paper reported on 27 November 1849 that "the inhabitants of Lawshall were greatly alarmed by the cry of fire which had broken out on the property of George Morley in Lawshall Street which destroyed a barn, stable and outbuildings. Prompt assistance from the Lawshall and Chadacre fire engines saved the house"

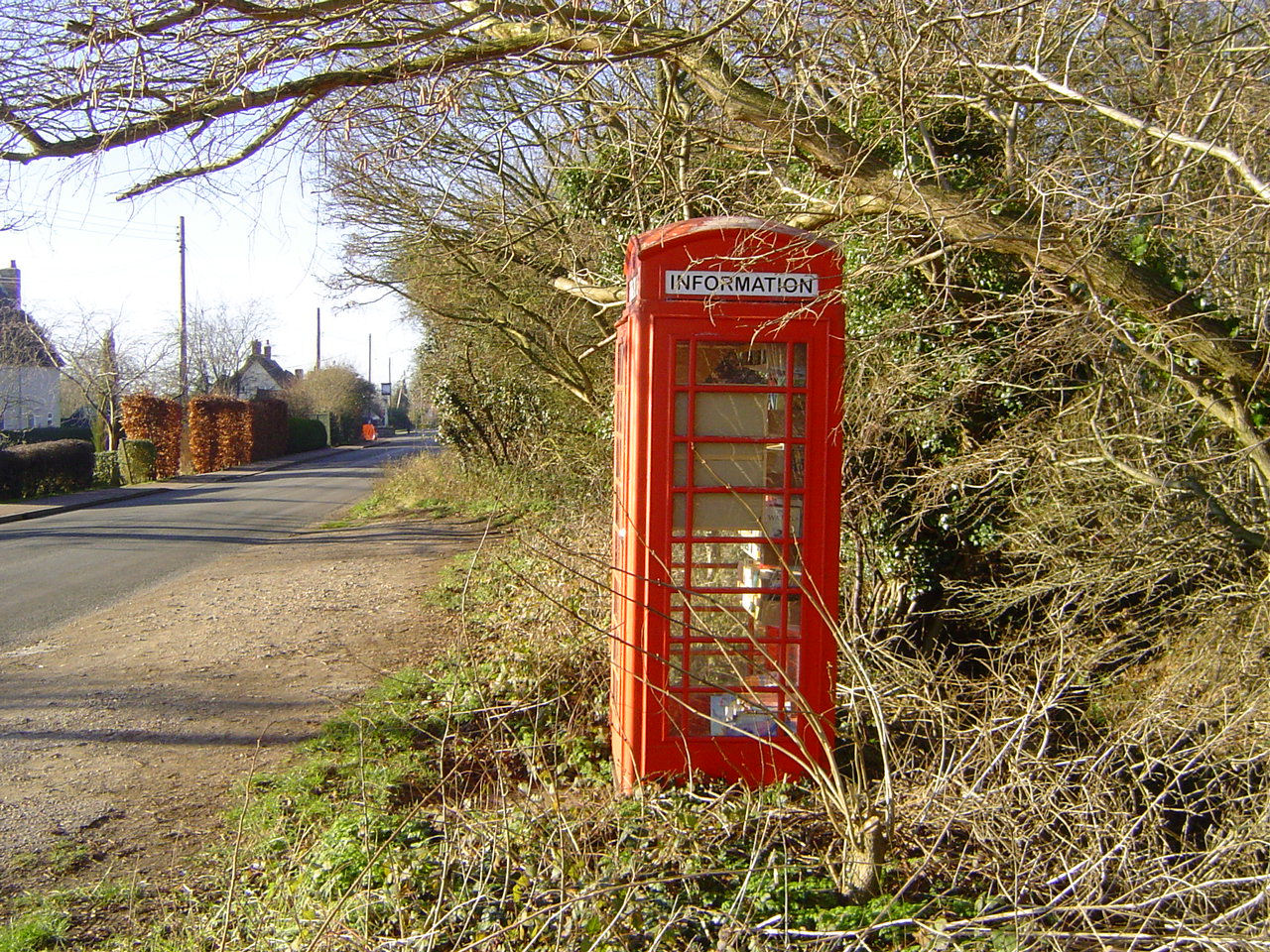
Re-use of red telephone box as a small book swap shop.

In 1857 a large service was held in All Saints Church to celebrate the completion of restoration work including the rebuilding of the chancel. Some £15 was obtained from the offertory and this was used to build a coal house and well for the village. The coal house was situated opposite the Swan Inn and later in its life became a reading room. The building has long since been demolished.

Maintaining a similar theme, the traditional K6 red telephone box opposite Swanfield began enjoying a new lease of life in 2011 as a small book swap shop. Where the old "telephone" logo once took pride of place at the top of the booth, the words "information" and "book swap shop" are now proclaimed in black letters on a white background.

The horse hair factory, first recorded in 1855, was located next to Walnut Trees and was later used as a village hall until the new village hall facility was constructed at Lambs Lane in the 1960s. The old village hall also served as the dining hall for the school.

The village pond is located to the north of The Street and for many years was available to local residents as a result of the goodwill of a local farmer. The pond was well stocked for fishing with common carp, mirror carp, crucian carp, common roach, rudd and tench. A familiar sight was to see local youngsters cycling or walking along The Street with their fishing rods.

== Listed buildings ==
English Heritage lists the following seven Grade II Listed buildings within the settlement of The Street, Lawshall:

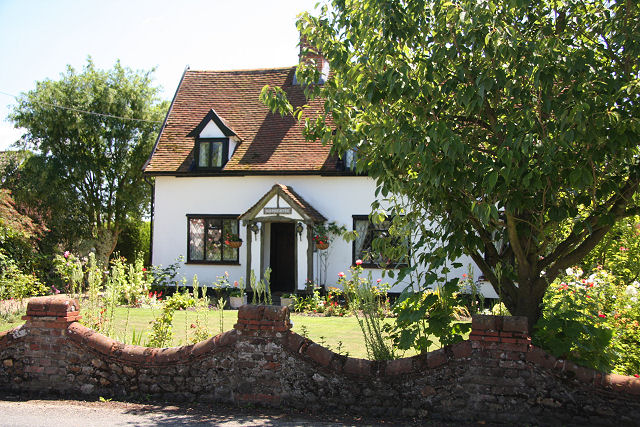
The Old Post Office

- Bowaters and Shepherds Cottage - Images of England
- Church House - Images of England
- Fox Cottage - Images of England
- Street Farmhouse - Images of England
- Swan Inn - Images of England
- The Old Post Office - Images of England
- The Walnut Trees - Images of England

NB: The above property details usually represent the names and addresses that were used at the time that the buildings were listed. In some instances the name of the building may have changed over the intervening years.

== All Saints CEVCP Primary School ==
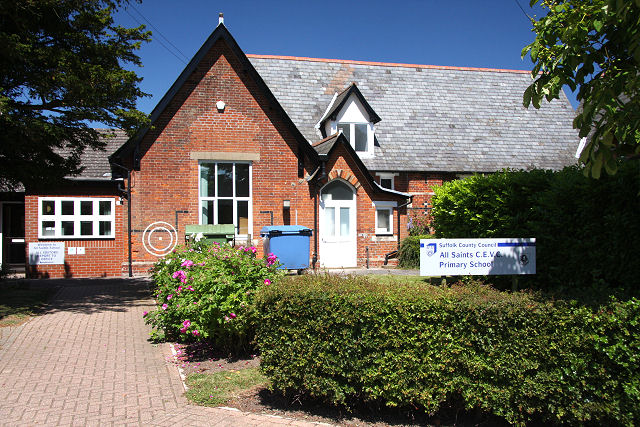
All Saints Primary School

All Saints CEVCP Primary School is a small successful primary school catering for pupils aged 5–9. The school has an average of 90 pupils and serves the settlements of Lawshall, Alpheton, Shimpling, Bridge Street and Hawstead. The Victorian building was sympathetically modernised and extended in 1989 to allow for more accommodation. The school has a purpose-built nursery building that is shared with Lawshall Pre-School, a self-funding organisation and charity. The links with the pre-school are strong and allow children to start and continue their education on the same campus, enabling smooth transitions and the chance to build a real partnership between home, school and the community.

In the late 1980s All Saints faced a very real threat of closure but survived the axe which sadly meant the closure of the neighbouring primary school in the village of Shimpling. All Saints was extended and a small playing field was provided at the rear of the school. Another significant improvement for school users was the provision of a footway in the early 1990s from Lambs Lane to The Street. This enabled children to walk to school from Harrow Green and Lambs Lane in safety.

All Saints is a Church of England school and has strong links with the Green Light Trust. This includes forest school sessions which are held in Frithy Wood by kind permission of the landowners.

Older children attend Hardwick Middle School and King Edward VI CEVC Upper School in Bury St Edmunds.

== Sports ==
=== Medieval football ===
Camping was a Medieval football game popular in parts of East Anglia. Of all the traditional forms of football played in Europe, it appears to have been one of the toughest and most dangerous. Matches were often between rival parishes and stirred local passions particularly when a prize was played for. The game was very rough and injuries many, as teams could field as many players as they wished. The neighbouring parishes of Hawstead and Cockfield each had their own Camp (football ground). Lawshall's Camping field was located south of The Street.

=== Cricket ===
Newspaper records indicate that Lawshall were regularly playing matches against other local villages in the late 19th century, as exemplified with detailed scores recorded for matches against Long Melford, Glemsford and Stanningfield. The home venue was the meadow between All Saints Church and Frithy Wood, a small part of which now forms the playing field for All Saints CEVCP Primary School.

== Industry ==
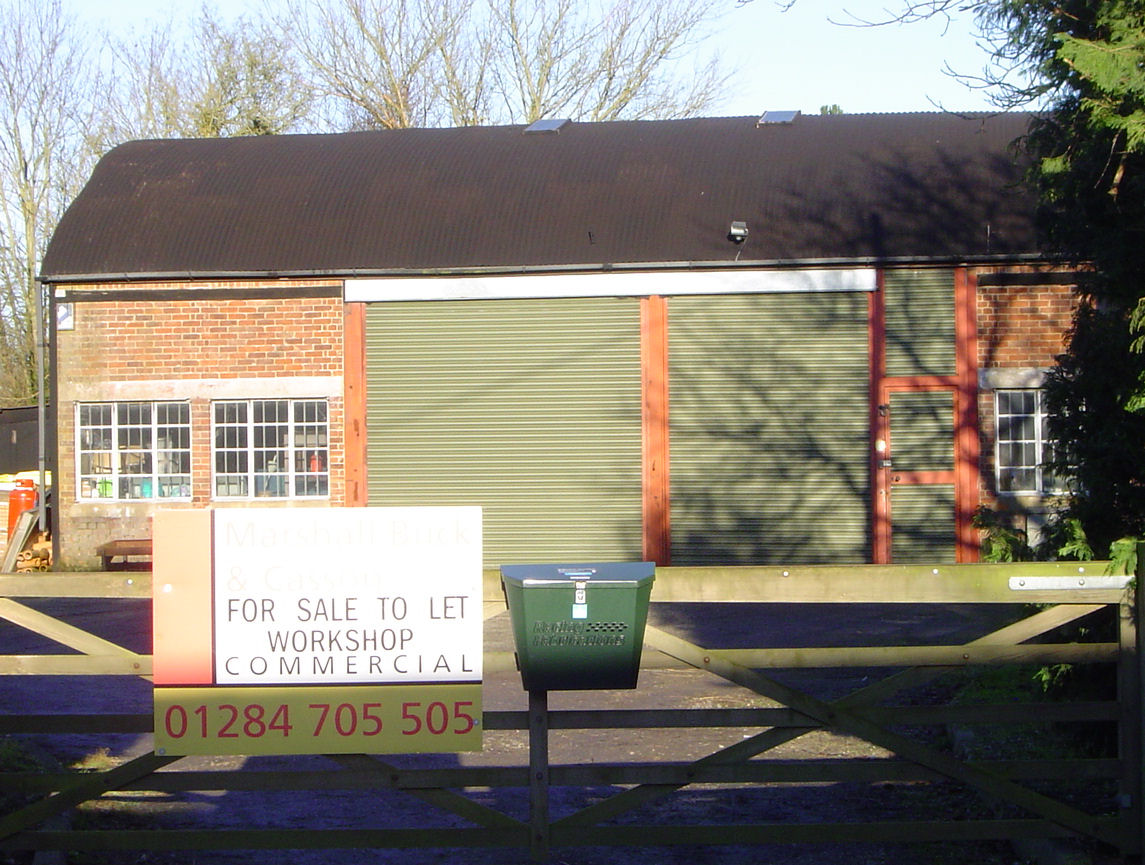
Workshop premises in The Street

The general perception of the parish of Lawshall is a rural area where agriculture has remained the dominant and primary activity for hundreds of years. Whilst this is accepted, there is evidence that other industries have also taken place in the parish. In The Street there is evidence of an extensive pottery production site close by All Saints Church. In the Bury and Norwich Post on 8 July 1846 notice was given that the Paradise Brick Kilns had opened in Lawshall. The village pond provides evidence of an excavated area to provide material for brick making.

White's Directory and Post Office Directory in the 19th century lists horse hair manufacturers (Harms, List & Co), hurdle makers, rake-makers, a wheelwright, blacksmiths and a cornmiller as well as many service providers such as saddler, coopers and carriers.

In the 1920s Canon Algernon Ogle Wintle, the rector of All Saints Church, set up a piano organ works and provided employment to many local people in the village in the depression years of the 1930s. The barrel pianos and organs represented a resourceful business for Canon Wintle who bought the used organs, renovated them and resold them under his name. He had a workshop full of barrel pianos and ladies of the village used to trundle the organs up to his house, with the pins pulled out ready for him to put in the latest tunes.

There now remains only one industrial unit in The Street, opposite Fox Cottage. The premises were originally agricultural workshops and have latterly been used for the erection and repair of specialist racing cars.
