= Listed buildings in Shimpling =

Civil Parish in Suffolk, England

Shimpling is a village and civil parish in the Babergh District of Suffolk, England. It contains 21 listed buildings that are recorded in the National Heritage List for England. Of these one is grade I and 20 are grade II.

This list is based on the information retrieved online from Historic England.

== Key ==
Grade	Criteria
I	Buildings that are of exceptional interest
II*	Particularly important buildings of more than special interest
II	Buildings that are of special interest

== Listing ==
Name	Grade	Location	Type	Completed (Note: The date given is the date used by Historic England as significant for the initial building or that of an important part in the structure's description.)	Date designated	Grid ref. (Note: The grid reference is based on the British national grid reference system, sometimes known as OSGB36, used by the Ordnance Survey.) Geo-coordinates	Notes	Entry number (Note: The "List Entry Number" is a unique number assigned to each listed building and scheduled monument by Historic England.)	Image	Wikidata
Shimpling Hall	II				10 January 1953	TL8584251251; 52°07′42″N 0°42′49″E		1033554	Upload Photo	Q26285037
The Hermitage	II	Bury Road, Cockfield			9 February 1978	TL8889352661; 52°08′24″N 0°45′32″E		1283352	Upload Photo	Q26572218
Chadacre Agricultural Institute	II	Chadacre Park			9 February 1978	TL8535752733; 52°08′30″N 0°42′26″E		1351906	Upload Photo	Q26634969
Principal's House Chadacre Agricultural Institute	II	Chadacre Park			9 February 1978	TL8540852472; 52°08′22″N 0°42′29″E		1033555	Upload Photo	Q26285038
8 and 9, Gents Lane	II	8 and 9, Gents Lane			9 February 1978	TL8686452576; 52°08′24″N 0°43′45″E		1283329	Upload Photo	Q26572196
Church of St George	I	Rectory Lane	church building		23 March 1961	TL8596451289; 52°07′43″N 0°42′55″E		1033556	Church of St George More images	Q17541600
Clock House Farmhouse	II	Rectory Lane			9 February 1978	TL8612451362; 52°07′45″N 0°43′04″E		1351907	Upload Photo	Q26634970
Thorne Lodge	II	Shimpling Road			14 August 1996	TL8853753024; 52°08′36″N 0°45′14″E		1268332	Upload Photo	Q26558647
The Cottage	II	Slough Hill			9 February 1978	TL8669952641; 52°08′26″N 0°43′37″E		1199587	Upload Photo	Q26495457
Gifford's Hall	II	Stanstead Road			9 February 1978	TL8436251488; 52°07′51″N 0°41′32″E		1033557	Upload Photo	Q26285040
Former Range of Almshouses	II	The Old Post Office And Chestnut Cottage, The Street, IP29 4HS			9 February 1978	TL8692452784; 52°08′30″N 0°43′49″E		1351870	Upload Photo	Q26634933
Ashton House	II	The Street			9 February 1978	TL8680352684; 52°08′27″N 0°43′42″E		1283291	Upload Photo	Q26572158
Court Cottage	II	The Street			9 February 1978	TL8688152750; 52°08′29″N 0°43′46″E		1033558	Upload Photo	Q26285041
Cromwell House	II	The Street			9 February 1978	TL8697052751; 52°08′29″N 0°43′51″E		1351871	Upload Photo	Q26634934
Homeleigh	II	The Street			9 February 1978	TL8688552755; 52°08′29″N 0°43′47″E		1199634	Upload Photo	Q26495500
Parish Coalhouse	II	The Street			9 February 1978	TL8699252804; 52°08′31″N 0°43′52″E		1283267	Upload Photo	Q26572135
Ramblers	II	The Street			9 February 1978	TL8684852644; 52°08′26″N 0°43′45″E		1033561	Upload Photo	Q26285044
Shimpling House	II	The Street			9 February 1978	TL8705552798; 52°08′30″N 0°43′56″E		1199649	Upload Photo	Q26495514
Shimpling Place	II	The Street			9 February 1978	TL8720452963; 52°08′36″N 0°44′04″E		1033559	Upload Photo	Q26285042
Thatch End and Cracketts	II	The Street			9 February 1978	TL8736752970; 52°08′36″N 0°44′12″E		1033560	Upload Photo	Q26285043
Village School	II	The Street			9 February 1978	TL8684252717; 52°08′28″N 0°43′44″E		1351908	Upload Photo	Q26634971

== See also ==
- Grade I listed buildings in Suffolk
- Grade II* listed buildings in Suffolk

== Sources ==
- Bettely, James; Pevsner, Nikolaus (2015) [1961], Suffolk: West, The Buildings of England, New Haven and London: Yale University Press, ISBN 978-0-300-19655-9
