= Harrow Green =

Hamlet in Suffolk, England

Coordinates: 52.159551°N 00.714985°E

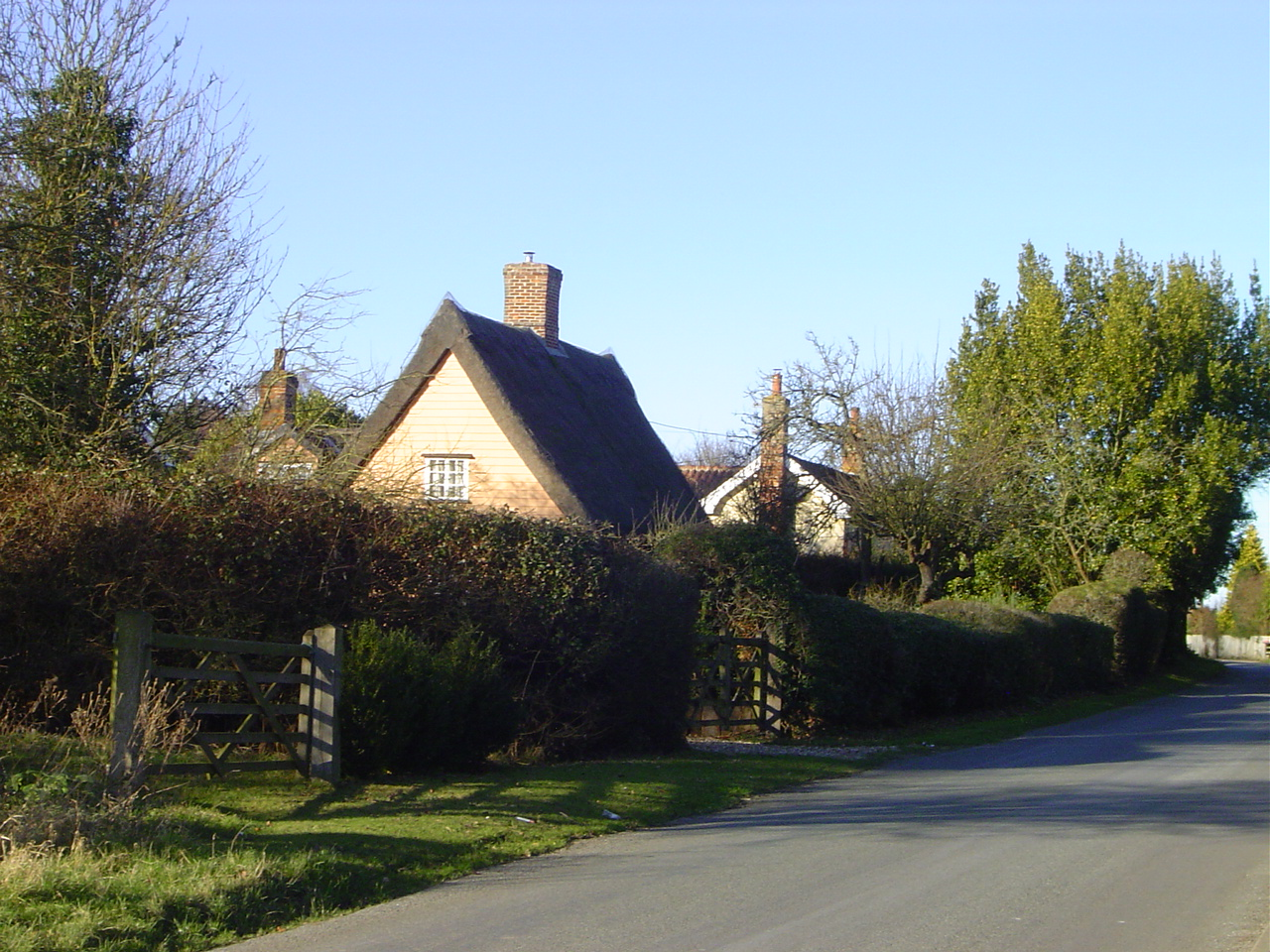
- The small hamlet of Harrow Green

- Location within Suffolk
- District: Babergh
- Shire county: Suffolk
- Region: East
- Country: England
- Sovereign state: United Kingdom
- Post town: Bury St Edmunds
- Postcode district: IP29

Harrow Green is a hamlet in the civil parish of Lawshall in the Babergh district in the county of Suffolk, England. It is located between Lambs Lane and The Street and is just over a mile off the A134 between Bury St Edmunds and Sudbury.

== The Lawshall Murder ==
The Lawshall Murder took place on Monday 20 January 1851 and was reported in detail in both the local and national press including The Times. The event will always be associated with the Harrow Inn at Harrow Green. Elizabeth Bainbridge, a 31-year-old dress and straw bonnet maker, was visiting her brother's public house, the Harrow Inn, where she spent time drinking with George Carnt, a 29-year-old farm labourer and lodger at the Inn. The couple appeared to have formed a recent attachment. She left the public house between three and four o'clock to return to her father's house across the fields. Carnt followed her to a pond where the murder took place. The Times on 24 January 1851 reported:

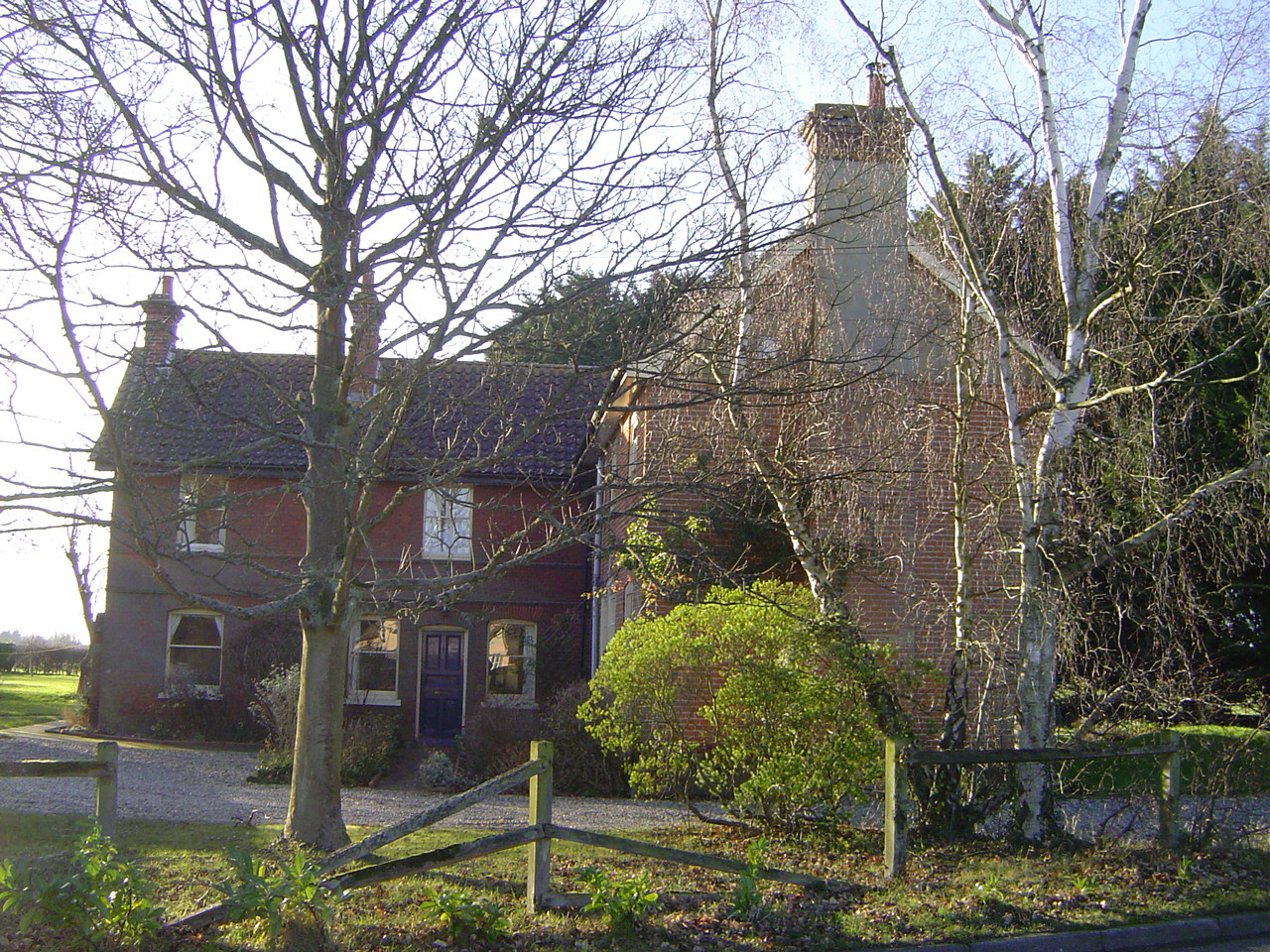
The former Harrow Inn, Harrow Green

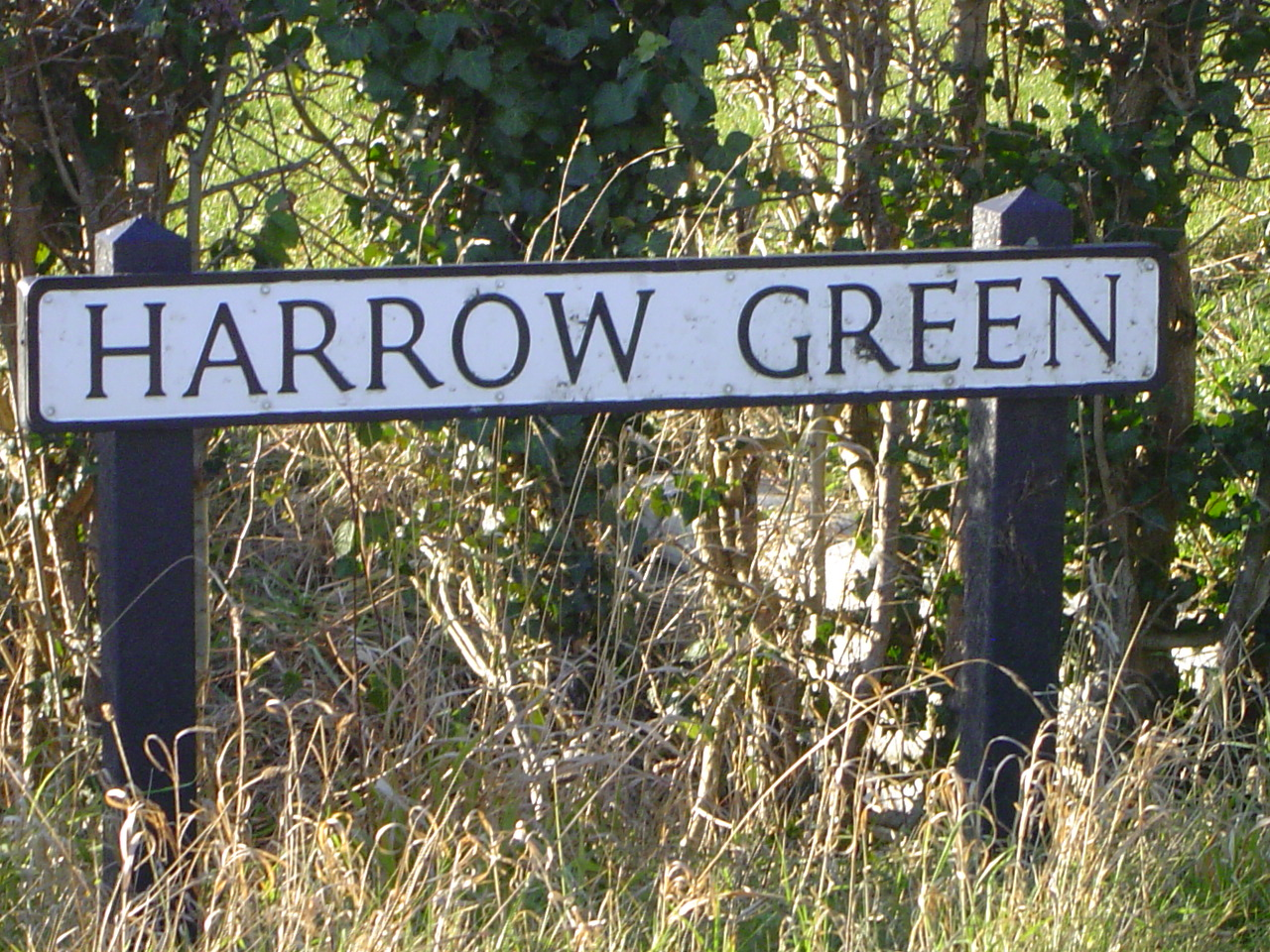
The street sign for Harrow Green

"It is evident, from the tattered condition of her dress and the state of the ground near the pond where the body was discovered, that a fearful struggle must have ensued between the unhappy victim and her murderer. It is conjectured that a refusal to comply with some improper overtures on his part led to a struggle, and that in a moment of revenge he forced her into the pond, where, from the shallowness of the water and the position she was found, it is apparent that she must have been held down with considerable violence in order to destroy her life. The pond is in a very lonely situation, and the banks is thickly studded with bushes."

On 28 January 1851 the Bury and Norwich Post reported that:

"About 5 o'clock the Mr Payne landlord, returned home from his father's house and was asked by his wife what time the deceased returned home. He frequently expressed hopes she would be alright. At about 7 o'clock the prisoner returned to the Harrow with his clothes dirty and wet. It was known that he suffered from fits. Payne said 'you fool you ought not never be trusted on your own if you blunder about in this way'."

"He was frequently obliged to take his handkerchief and loosen it. Payne asked him where his hat was. Carnt, who frequently had epileptic fits, said 'in the pond'. Mr Payne despatched a man to his father to see if his sister had arrived home. The answer was no. PC Keable was sent for and on his arrival the prisoner refused to make any answer."

"Keable, her father and George Farrow commenced a search for her. For near a mile they traced their footsteps which stopped near a pond. On inspection with a lanthorn, Keable perceived something and jumped in the water and found the body of deceased. They conveyed it to a neighbouring house where a large bruise was found on her face as if from a blow."

"They proceeded at once to the Harrow where Carnt was arrested and taken into custody. Supt. Death of Clare was sent for and he ascertained all the facts. The deceased was described as an industrious and respectable person who had been deserted by her husband. The prisoner also bore a good character of a hard working labourer. The only allusion he made to the event was in the course of the night was to one of those he was drinking with, when he said while drinking brandy and water, was that he was afraid that it was the last time they would drink together."

On the Tuesday an inquest was held at the Harrow public house. The Times reported:

"The body of the deceased presented the appearance of a fine healthy woman of ordinary stature, possessing rather pleasing features, with the exception of a slight bruise on the side of the head, there was nothing to indicate that she had met a violent death. Both arms, however, bore marks of having been tightly gripped, evidently inflicted while the poor creature was being held under the water."

George Carnt was taken to Bury gaol where he awaited execution. The Bury and Norwich Post on 16 April 1851 reported that:

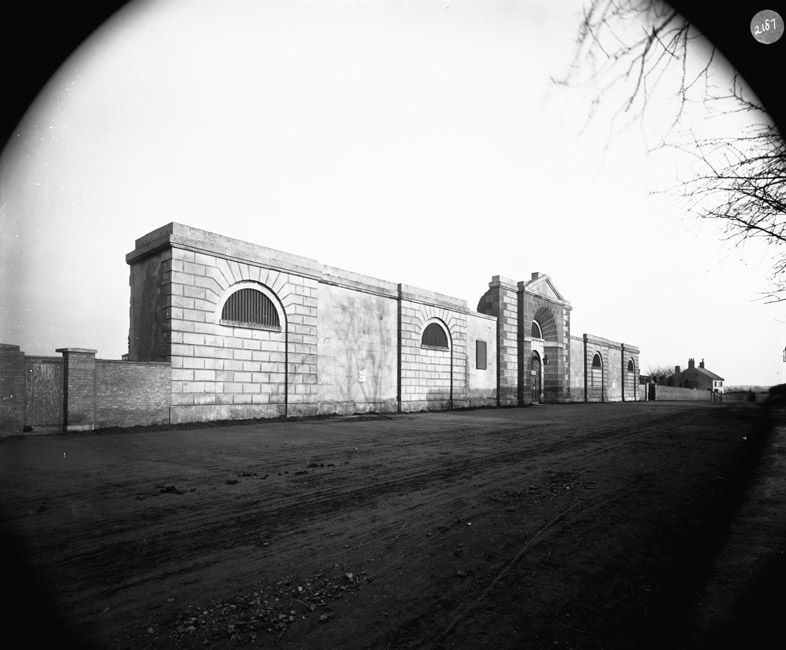
Old Gaol, Southgate Street, Bury St Edmunds

"Statements in a London paper are incorrect. He did not state the unfortunate woman refused to yield to his desires and the murder was the result of her resistance. On the contrary we believe his statements that they had been in company for several hours and had exchanged love tokens found upon their persons. But while walking together, the deceased snatched a knife from out of the prisoner's pocket and declared she could not bear such a life any longer and made a motion as if to cut her throat. This the prisoner prevented upon which she declared she would drown herself and rushed into the pond. The prisoner followed and in a phrenzy for which he cannot account except he was full of beer for two days of club revelling and admits that in spite of her struggles and screams he held her down in the water till life was extinct intending after to destroy himself in the state of madness."

The Bury and Norwich Post on 23 April 1851 reported that:

"On Wednesday night the prisoner's father and step mother, brothers, sisters and Mr Payne came to see him. His aged father wept bitterly. The prisoner leapt up and said "cheer up old boy". His father said "George if you had taken my advice it would not have come to this." The prisoner replied "that's true but you don't know the temptations I have had". He then proceeded to divide various articles of clothing among members of the family. "Whereabouts in Lawshall churchyard did they bury her?" On being informed, he replied, "poor thing, I am sorry for her. I knew it was wrong to live on the terms we did". He wished the day of his death would come on Tuesday morning, The hour was fixed much earlier the usual in the hope of lessening the concourse of spectators, but early as it was, the eagerness for such a spectacles was shown by the arrival of people as early as 6 o' clock."

"The execution shall take place on the flat roof between the Infirmary on the south side and the entrance to the Porter's lodge. The new gallows had been prepared on a new principle by Mr Darkin of Bury and it was not brought out until 7 next morning and at 8-30 it was fixed without noise. As the fatal hour approached, the London and Nowton roads and the intervening fields were occupied in every part with a view of the awful scene. The crowd consisted almost entirely of the working class, the large proportion being females, many bringing children and infants with them, We scarcely noticed 50 persons of superior class and a rough calculation between 4000 to 5000 people were present."

"The behaviour of the crowd was mainly decorous, shortly after 9 o' clock the death bell was mournfully heard in the air and the fatal procession emerged from the condemned cell, the Chaplain in his surplice read the sentence from the burial service and the under Sheriff, Mr Gooding and Mr Sparke followed the criminal, assisted by the Governor. The operation of pinioning was performed by Calcraft, the rope was adjusted to a staple fixed in the beam and the cap was drawn on over the prisoner face, at the appointed signal of the Chaplain closing his book, the bolt was drawn and without a struggle the unhappy man was despatched to eternity. He was buried in the precincts of the gaol."

The hanging of George Carnt on 22 April 1851 was the last execution in Bury St Edmunds.

== Harrow Inn ==
It is not possible to provide a complete list of all the publicans (and residents) of the Harrow Inn or the verified dates when they took over or left the public house. However, with reference to the Official Census, White's Directory, Post Office Directory and other sources the following list is provided:

Year(s)	Publicans (and residents)
1844	Thos Ashfield
1851	William Payne
1855–61	Thomas Frost
1865–69	George Ford

Year(s)	Publicans (and residents)
1871–92	Margaret Price
1900–01	George Steward
1911–22	Susannah Steward (Mrs George Steward)
1971	Jim Mapston

The Bury Free Press on 5 September 1891 reported that the Harrow Inn was offered for sale on Wednesday evening together with a lucrative baking business. It had been owned by Messrs Biddell and passed into the hands of Messrs Mauldon of Sudbury for £760. The public house would survive another 80 years before finally closing its doors in 1971.

== Listed buildings ==
English Heritage lists one Grade II Listed building within the hamlet of Harrow Green:

- The Ryes – An eighteenth-century timber framed and plastered house with a thatched roof, one central chimney stack and one stack at the west end.

NB: The above property details represent the name and address that was used at the time that the building was listed. In some instances the name of the building may have changed over the intervening years.
