= All Saints' Church, Lawshall =

Coordinates: 52.1549°N 0.7248°E

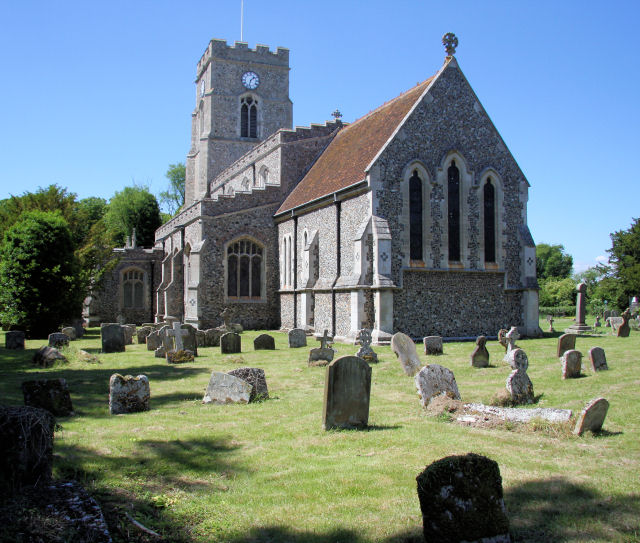
- All Saints' Church, Lawshall, a Grade I listed Building

- Location in Suffolk
- OS grid reference: TL8643654260
- Location: Lawshall, Suffolk
- Country: England
- Denomination: Anglican
- Website: St Edmund Way Benefice, Lawshall Church

History
- Dedication: All Saints

Architecture
- Functional status: Active
- Heritage designation: Grade I
- Designated: 23 March 1961
- Architect(s): William Butterfield (restorations)
- Architectural type: Church

Specifications
- Materials: Flint with stone dressings.

Administration
- Province: Canterbury
- Diocese: St Edmundsbury and Ipswich
- Archdeaconry: Sudbury
- Parish: Lawshall

Clergy
- Rector: Matthew Lawson

The Parish Church of All Saints' Lawshall, is an Anglican church in the village of Lawshall, Suffolk, England. It has been designated by English Heritage as a Grade I listed building. The church is located in between Lawshall Hall and All Saints CEVCP Primary School. The church is in the process of joining the Chadbrooke benefice, whose Rector is Revd Matthew Lawson.

== History ==
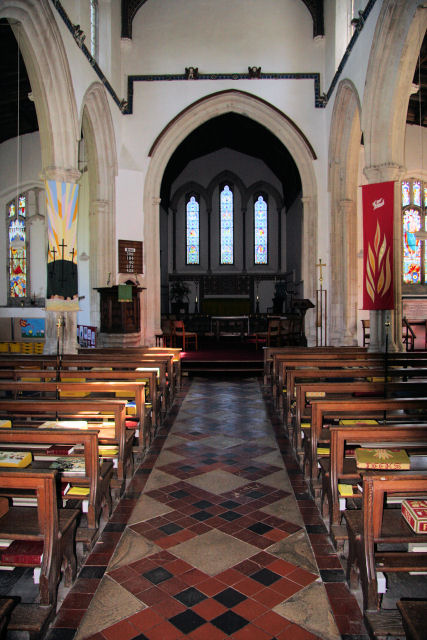
The tiled nave of All Saints' Church

In the Domesday Book of 1086, Lawshall is recorded as having "a church with 30 acres of free land", and probably long before that time people were worshipping on the site of the present church. As in many churches throughout the country, the building has undergone many changes over the centuries. The two biggest changes took place in the 1440s and 1850s.

The earliest part of the church that can be dated is in the Early English period c.1166–1266, the chancel and possibly the east windows being of this period. The predominant style of construction which can be identified in the aisle window of the nave is known as perpendicular and dates from c.1366–1566.

The church was almost completely rebuilt in the mid-15th century on the profits of the cloth industry. A great deal of rebuilding work took place in the 1440s following a bequeathal in 1426 by William Hanningfield "to the building of Lawshall Church – £40 – for my ancestors to be prayed for". This was a huge amount and would represent millions in today's terms.

Before the violent fracture of the Reformation, All Saints' was where the Catholic priests of the parish ministered. After the Reformation the church became a vast preaching house.

For much of the Late Middle Ages and Early Modern period records are scant but in the 18th century there is greater availability of parish records. Stephen Cambourne, the rector, in his will dated 1704 gave his library of mostly theological books to his successors at Lawshall. About 137 survive and can be viewed at the Records Office library in Bury St Edmunds.

In 1735 the church bells were restored to the tower after being silent for 90 years. The first bells were in place as early as 1553 but were removed about 1650 during the English Civil War. In 1740 the church received the gift of the vicarage house from Baptist Lee, the Lord of the Manor and patron of the church. The vicarage house was on the site of All Saints Primary School. The house was used by assistant clergy until 1820 when Mrs Barrington Purvis gave £500 for its reconstruction as a school.

The church is depicted in Thomas Gainsborough's 1752 work, showing John Plampin in Chadacre Park looking towards Lawshall. The oil painting is on display at the National Gallery.

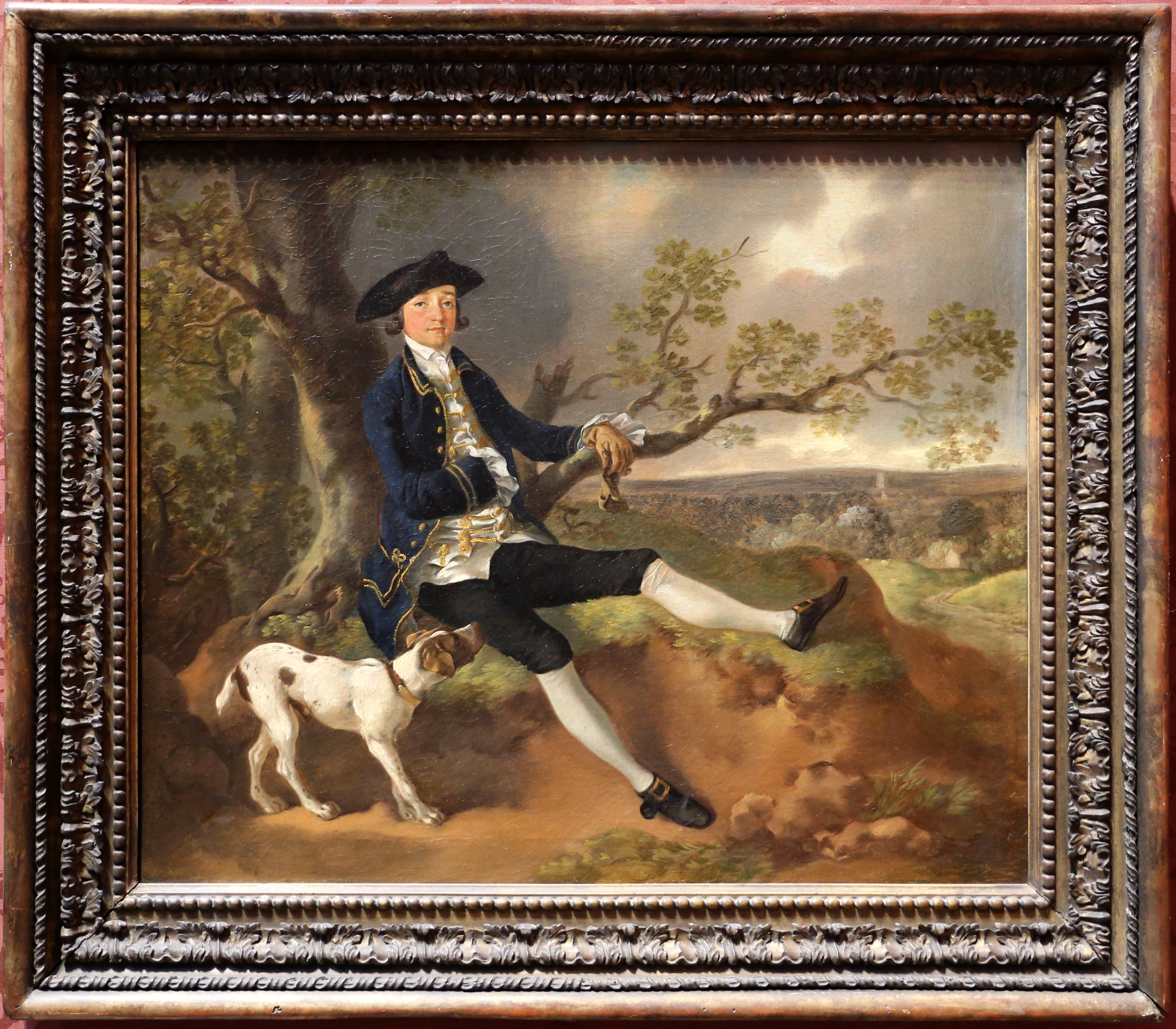
John Plampin of Chadacre Hall by Thomas Gainsborough on display at the National Gallery.

During the prosperous high farming period of the 19th century the most important restoration for over 100 years were undertaken by William Butterfield in the Anglo-catholic style. The rector, Evan Baillie, spent £3,000 of his own money in rebuilding the chancel and putting in new windows. Just 9 months after the completion of this restoration work Baillie resigned his post and became a teacher at the Church of Our Lady and St Joseph, the Roman Catholic Chapel on Bury Road. His successor was Barrington Mills who proved a strong influence on the village.

In the 1850s the church was completely re-floored with wooden boarding and very fine Minton tiles in the sanctuary. The present high quality organ was installed by Wordsworth & Co in 1907, in memory of Barrington Mills.

There are very few memorials or monuments in the church. Some were removed in the 1857 restoration, and some were covered by Minton tiles in the sanctuary. On the south side, near the font, is a memorial plaque to a Dutch airman, Flight Sergeant Johannes Bartholomeus Jat Van Mesdag, whose plane crashed at Bury Road. On the opposite wall is a list of incumbents from the year 1306.

The churchyard contains the war grave of a British airman of World War II.

The Register of Baptisms, Marriages and Burials dates from December 1558.

== Architecture ==
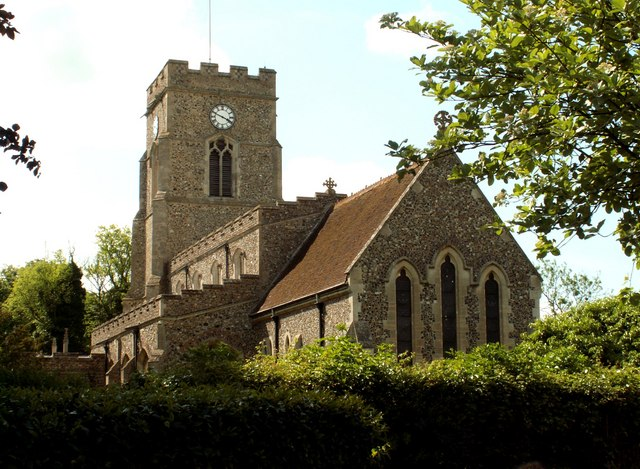
All Saints Church, Lawshall

This fifteenth flint church is a Grade I listed building with stone dressings comprising a tall west tower, nave, aisles and a 19th-century chancel. The west tower has 4 stages with a castellated parapet and diagonal buttresses. The nave mid aisles have castellated parapets. The interior has good roofs to the nave and aisles with moulded beams and puffins and there is a carved cornice to the nave. Interior fittings include a 14th-century font and, a 16th-century carved chest. It has been recorded as a Grade I listed building in recognition of its architectural, historical and topographical value.

The Porch to the South door was re-built in 1856–57 in the 15th-century architectural style with some re-used medieval timbers in the roof. The carving on the ribs and new rafters is of high quality, as is the stone doorway surround to the entrance of the church.

The Tower houses 5 bells, the earliest dated 1755. The high quality, flower decorated Font dates from the 1440s, the font cover from 1856. The North doorway is of the Decorated period (1300–1380).

The Nave, Clerestory and Aisles. The high quality arcade arches of the nave with aisles either side and clerestory above date from the 1440s as the result of funding by William Hanningfield.

The Chancel An early illustration of the church exists by the artist Isaac Johnson who travelled Suffolk between 1810 and 1818. His illustration (now in the Ipswich Record Office) shows a low chancel with a round-headed Norman doorway on the south side – part of the Domesday church. The chancel was demolished and rebuilt in the mid 19th century, following a gift by the rector, Evan Baillie. The organ and gallery moved nearer to the east of the church, the font was moved to the present site, a new oak pulpit and pews installed and an Early English style window installed at the east end.

== St Edmund Way Benefice ==
The Church of All Saints' Lawshall is part of a united Benefice which includes the Anglican congregations of six parishes and six places of worship covering Bradfield Combust, Great Whelnetham, Hawstead, Lawshall, Nowton and Stanningfield. Details of services can be viewed in the monthly St Edmund Way magazine or the St Edmund Way website. The incumbent is Jayne Buckles who lives at Lawshall Rectory.

The Benefice was named after the St Edmund Way Long Distance Path that goes through the parishes making its way to Bury St Edmunds. In centuries past, Pilgrims would walk this path to the Bury St Edmunds Abbey.

== Gallery ==
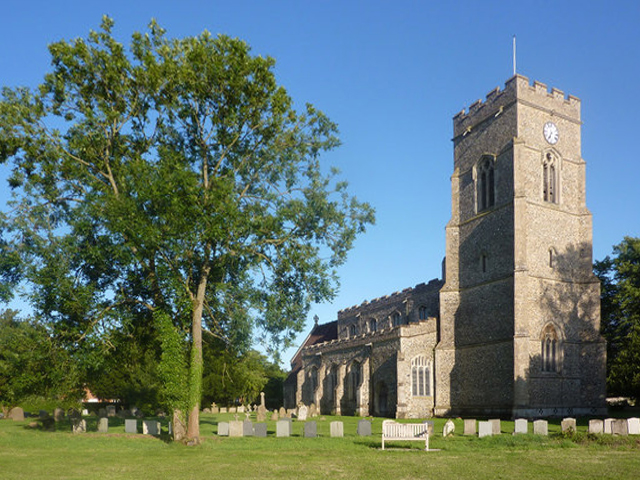
All Saints Church from northwest of churchyard.

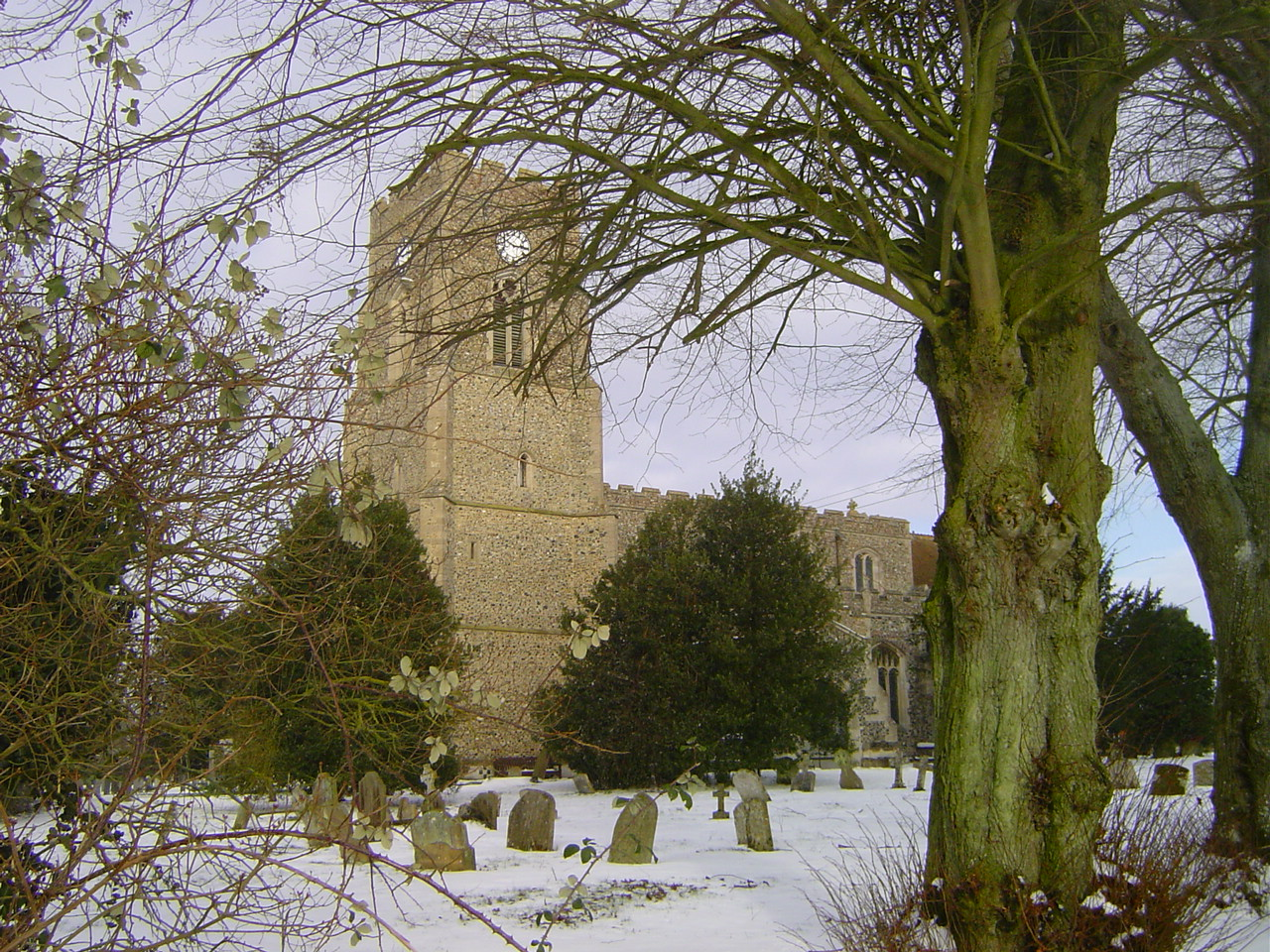
All Saints Church viewed from The Street in winter.

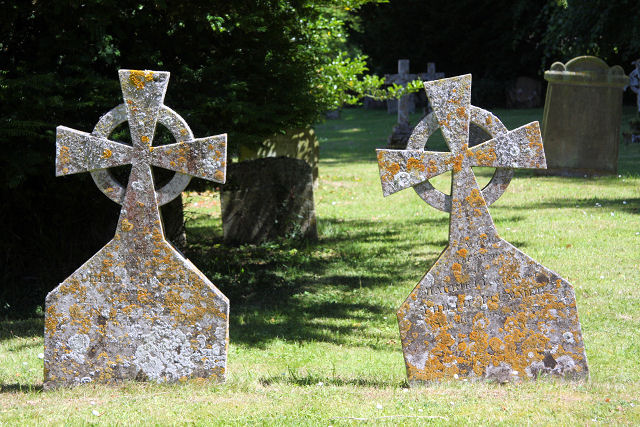
Gravestones in Lawshall churchyard.

== Incumbents ==
Records are available of the incumbents of All Saints Church from 1306. The first was Jo Gossyl who was appointed by the Bishop of Norwich and served the parish from 1306 to 1310.

=== Evan Baillie ===
In 1856 the Lawshall rector, Evan Baillie, received a substantial legacy and spent over £3,000 on the restoration of the church. This enabled the chancel to be demolished and rebuilt. However, only nine months after the church was restored Baillie resigned his post and became a teacher at the Roman Catholic Chapel on the Bury Road. This apparent change in religious affinities has not been explained, but he did publish a collection of twelve sermons which he claimed were not contrary to the doctrines of the Church of England. They were dedicated to Thomas Sargeant, one of his churchwardens, who had stood by him in his "time of trial".

=== Barrington Mills ===
Baillie's successor in 1858 was Barrington Mills who proved a strong influence on the village. His habit of visiting every parishioner who failed to attend Sunday service would certainly have helped increase attendance. With the aid of Mr and Mrs Frost he started daily services in the church. Mrs Frost was head-mistress of the school and Mr Frost the organist. The school provided the choir and any boys failing to attend had a fine docked from their annual retainer of £1. Mills did have a generous side to his nature, and when on a seaside holiday he would arrange for a cartload of fish to be delivered to the village for his parishioners.

=== Canon Algernon Ogle Wintle ===
In 1923 Canon Algernon Ogle Wintle became rector of Lawshall. He played street pianos for charity in Bury St Edmunds and became well known to shoppers in the town. A radio broadcast led to a succession of small barrel organs being sent to him for repair. Canon Wintle set up a piano organ works and provided employment to many local people in the village in the depression years of the 1930s. The barrel pianos and organs represented a resourceful business for Canon Wintle who bought the used organs, renovated them and resold them under his name. He is recalled as a rotund, grumpy man with a workshop full of barrel pianos. Ladies of the village used to trundle them up to his house, with the pins pulled out ready for him to put in the latest tunes. He gave talks on BBC Radio and in 1954 met the Queen and Queen Mother at Sandringham House.
