= Frithy and Chadacre Woods =

Site of Special Scientific Interest in Suffolk, England

Coordinates: 52.15°N 0.72°E

- Site of Special Scientific Interest
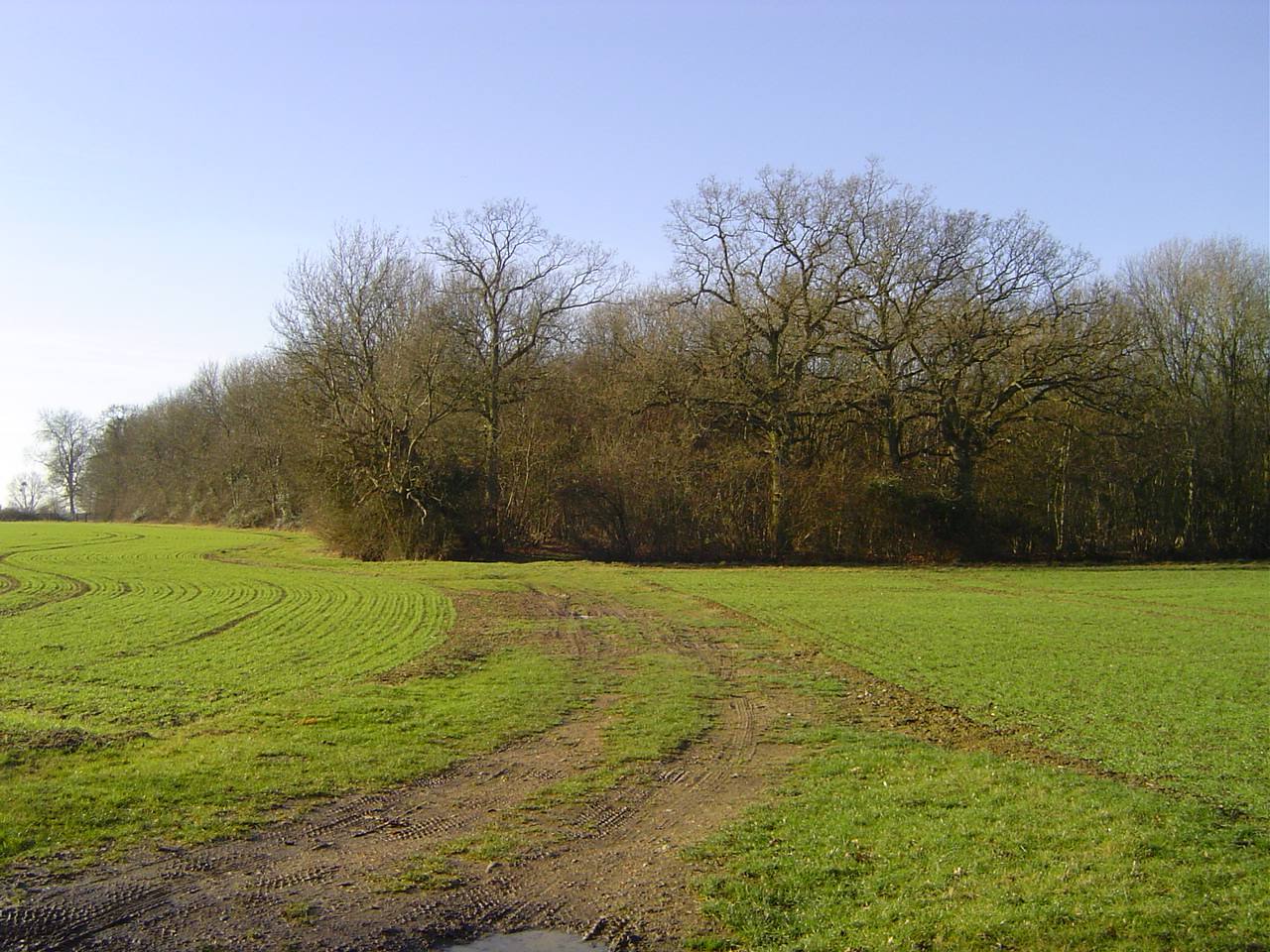
- Frithy Wood
- Location of Frithy and Chadacre Woods.
- Area of search: Suffolk
- Grid reference: TL 859 536
- Interest: Biological
- Area: 28.7 hectares
- Notification date: 1987
- Location map: Magic Map

Frithy and Chadacre Woods is a 28.7-hectare (71-acre) biological Site of Special Scientific Interest (SSSI) in the parishes of Lawshall and Shimpling in Suffolk, England.

== Description ==
Three ancient and semi-natural woods form the SSSI, namely Frithy Wood in Lawshall parish and Ashen Wood and Bavins Wood on the Chadacre Estate in Shimpling parish.

All three woods are of the wet ash (Fraxinus excelsior) / maple (Acer campestre) type, with hazel (Corylus avellana) also present in considerable quantity. There are pedunculate oak (Quercus robur) trees and other tree and shrub species include aspen (Populus tremula), wild cherry (Prunus avium), midland hawthorn (Crataegus laevigata), hornbeam (Carpinus betulus), crab apple (Malus sylvestris), holly (Ilex aquifolium), spindle (Euonymus europaeus) and common dogwood (Cornus sanguinea). The structure of the woods has been greatly influenced by the management of the coppice.

The three woods have diverse woodland floor vegetation, which is dominated by either dog's mercury (Mercurialis perennis) or brambles (Rubus spp.). They contain a number of plants characteristic of woodlands of this type including herb paris (Paris quadrifolia) in Ashen Wood and wood spurge (Euphorbia amygdaloides), woodruff (Galium odoratum), sanicle (Sanicula europaea) and stinking iris (Iris foetidissima) in Frithy Wood. The SSSI lies within the distribution of oxlip (Primula elatior) and all three woods contain this species. There are many other woodland floor plants including early purple orchid (Orchis mascula), twayblade (Neottia ovata), gromwell (Lithospermum officinale) and bluebell (Hyacinthoides non-scriptus).

There are several well-vegetated rides in the group of woods that support a mixture of woodland and meadow plant species and which attract considerable numbers of common butterflies. Frithy Wood also contains an area of pasture which projects into the wood which is partly shaded by a number of standard trees.

The birdlife of Frithy Wood has been recorded in detail with species including the nightingale, European green woodpecker, great spotted woodpecker and lesser spotted woodpecker which breed regularly.

Roe deer, fallow deer and muntjac can also be seen in the woods but they have caused considerable damage to the ground vegetation.

== Forest school ==
Forest school sessions are held in Frithy Wood by permission of the landowners. The 'school' represents an initiative of All Saints Primary School, Lawshall and the Green Light Trust, an environmental and educational charity.

== History ==
Oliver Rackham has stated that "a wood now called The Frith is almost certain to be pre-conquest, from Old English Fyrhp." In a later book he stated that "an Anglo-Saxon (parallel) is fyrth, a wood, which has given rise to many Frith or Frithy Woods."

There is documentary evidence for the existence of Frithy (formerly Frith) Wood dating back to 1545 and its Saxon name would imply that the wood is much older than that. All three woods are part of ancient woodland and contain broad boundary banks and ditches typical of coppice woods dating from the medieval period or before.

In more recent times in the twentieth century pigs were kept in Frithy Wood and at one time the wood extended as far as The Street.

== Newspaper records ==
On 31 August 1921 it was reported in the Suffolk Free Press that the remains of George Nunn aged 55 of Lawshall were discovered hanging in Frithy Wood. He had been missing for around 4 months since 22 April and was found a short distance from where he lived.

== Access ==
The woods are not private with easy access.
