= Lambs Lane, Lawshall =

Coordinates: 52.1600°N 0.7110°E

Lambs Lane
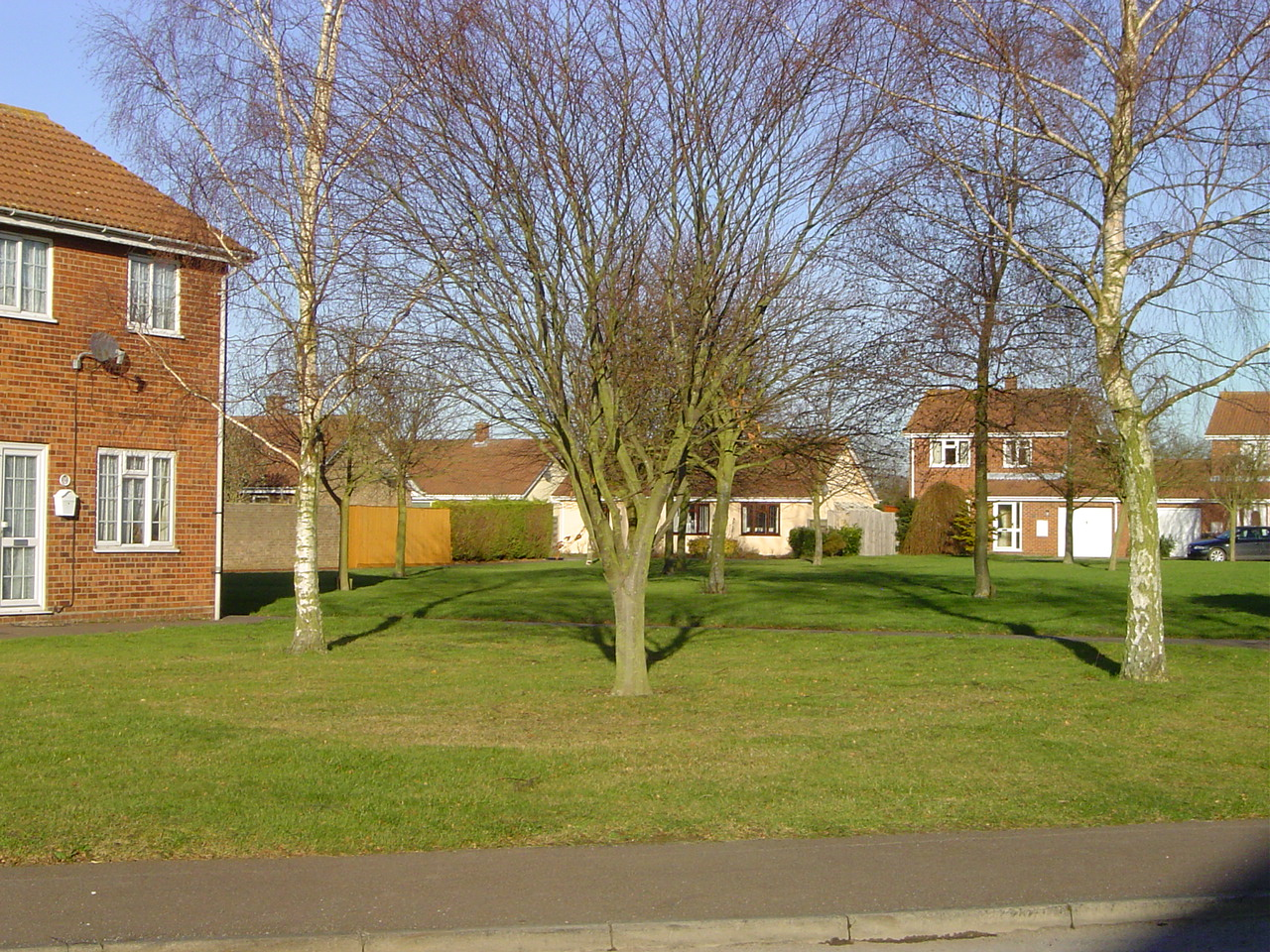
- The Glebe residential development

- Location within Suffolk
- District: Babergh
- Shire county: Suffolk
- Region: East
- Country: England
- Sovereign state: United Kingdom
- Post town: Bury St Edmunds
- Postcode district: IP29

Lambs Lane is a nucleated settlement in the civil parish of Lawshall in the Babergh district in the county of Suffolk, England. In addition to Lambs Lane, the settlement includes The Glebe, Shepherds Drive, Windsor Drive, Churchill Close and Rectory Corner. Melford Road is partly within Lambs Lane and Golden Lane is to the west of the settlement.

Lambs Lane is located between Harrow Green, which it almost abuts, and Brockley to the west, and is around one and a half miles off the A134 between Bury St Edmunds and Sudbury.

== Previous names ==
In the 1567 Lawshall Survey, Melford Road was known as Chardakre Street and Rectory Corner as the Parson's Green. Golden Lane was known as Goldesborowe Street.

== Lawshall Village Hall ==
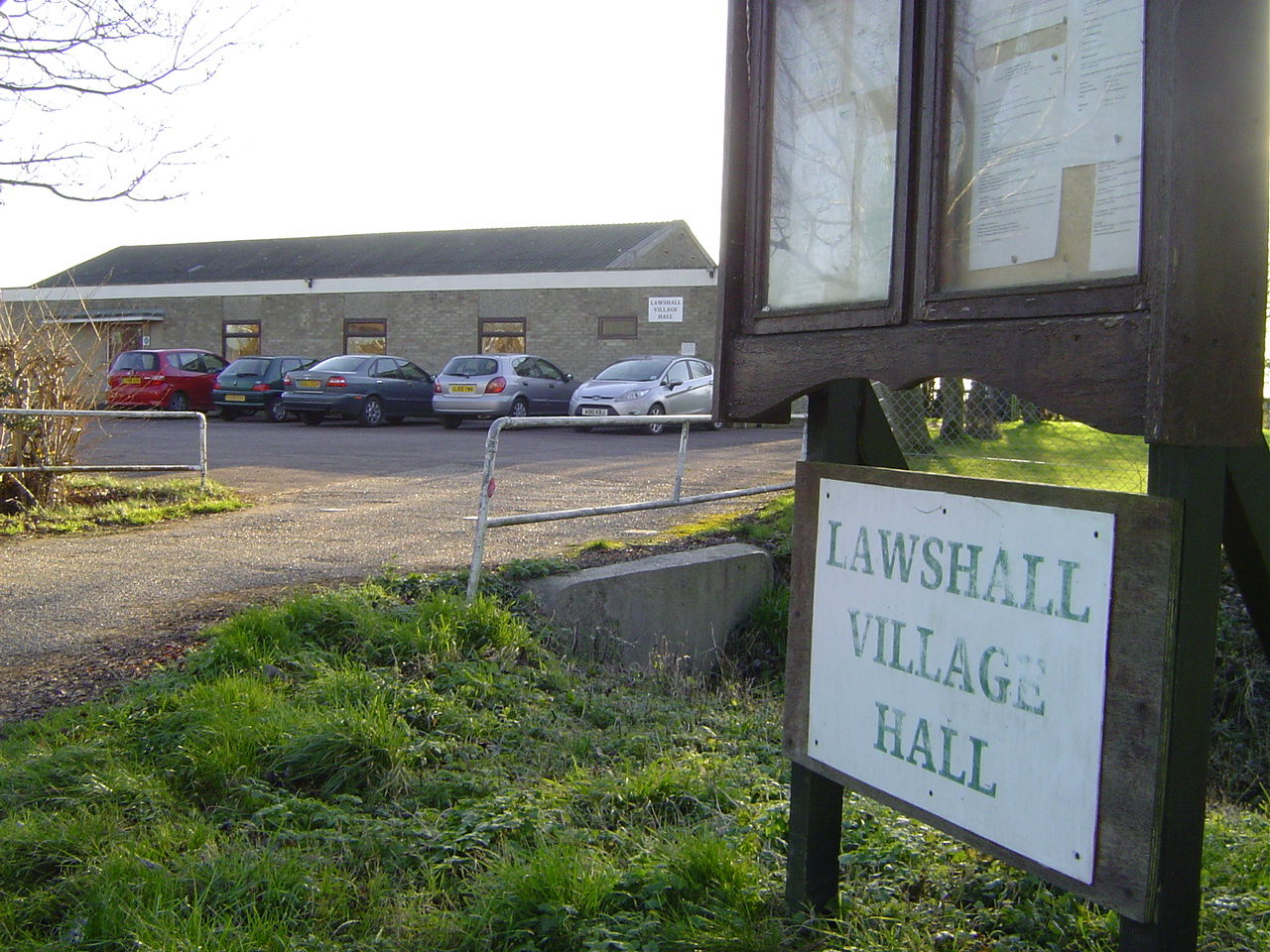
Lawshall Village Hall

Lawshall Village Hall was built in the 1960s replacing the old village hall that stood in the Street. In December 2006 the Village Hall Management Committee started organising events to raise money to update and refurbish the hall. A variety of events were organised and grants were also obtained. The result was that by the end of 2007 the committee were in a position to start work on a major refurbishment scheme which together cost around £47,000. Improvements include:

- Completely new floor and flat roof replaced
- New toilets including facilities for the disabled
- Two new small meeting rooms
- New comfortable chairs and folding plastic topped tables
- Full sound system and hearing loop installed
- Refurbished stage and curtains with a small 'Green Room'

The Village Hall Management Committee produce the monthly magazine Round & About Lawshall. A free copy is delivered to every household in the village.

== Village shop ==
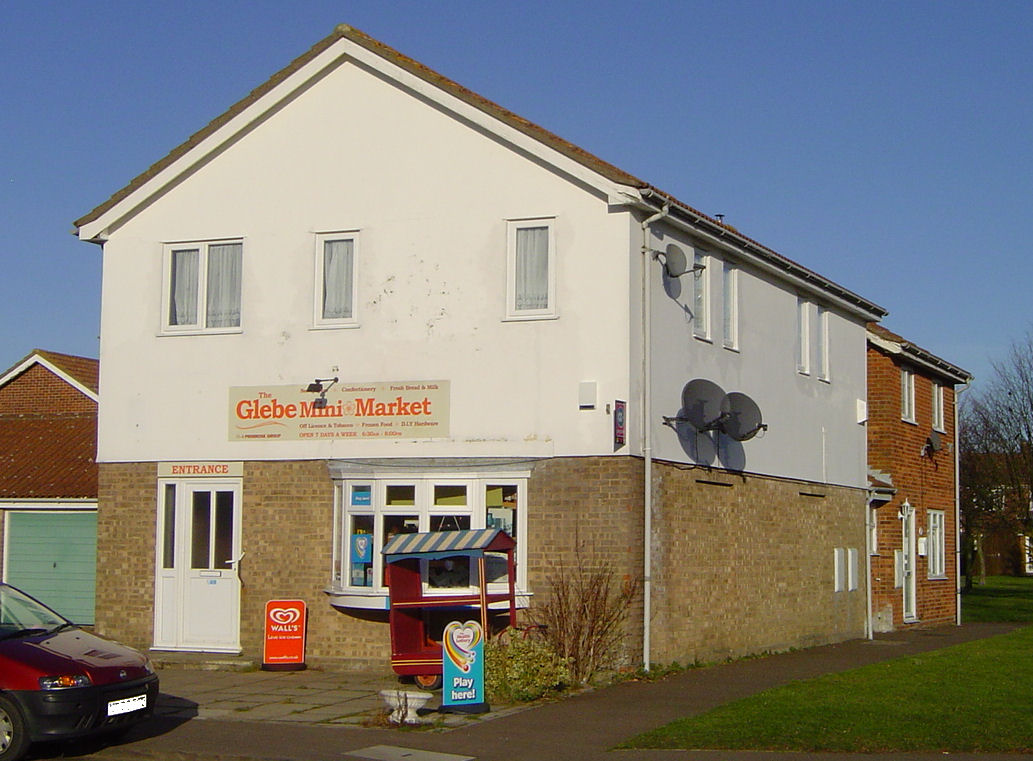
The Glebe Mini Market

As the population of the parish grew in the nineteenth century the number of shops serving the expanding community increased from 2 shops in 1844 to 6 shops in 1883. In 1937 there were still 6 shops although there had been reductions in the number in the 1920s. The shop unit was created as part of the housing development on The Glebe in the 1970s and for a long time was known as the Mace Shop. The shop was run by John Smith and later became known as the Glebe Stores.

In the 1990s there were 2 shops in the village, the Glebe Stores and the Post Office, which reduced to one shop after the millennium and then following the closure of the Glebe Stores the village did not have a shop for a number of years. This position changed in 2010 following the re-opening of the store on The Glebe as The Glebe Mini Market.

== King William Inn ==
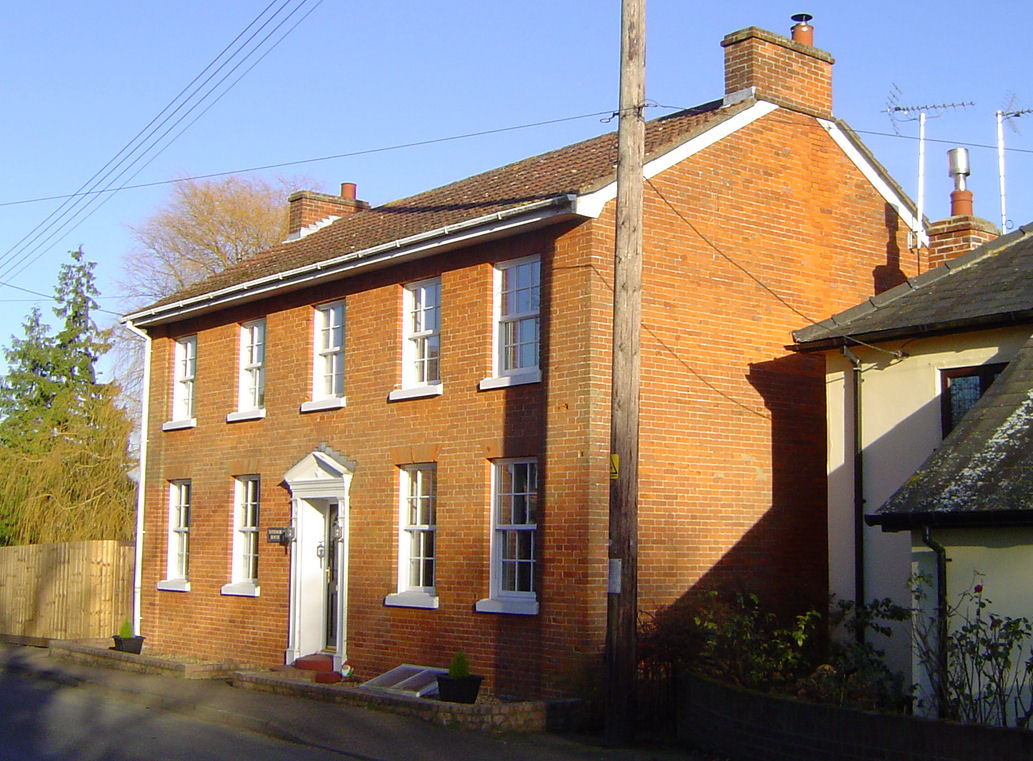
The former King William Inn

Windsor House in Bury Road was formally the King William Public House which closed in the 1940s. In the Suffolk Free Press on 27 September 1945 it was reported that Mr Talbott of Loft Farm, Bradfield Combust and landlord of the King William Inn had died.

It is not possible to provide a complete list of all the publicans (and residents) of the King William or the verified dates when they took over or left the public house. However, with reference to the Official Census, White's Directory, Post Office Directory and other sources the following list is provided:

Year(s)	Publicans (and residents)
1871	George Nunn
1879-91	Meshack Sergeant
1911-16	Benjamin Talbott

== Listed buildings ==
English Heritage does not list any Listed buildings within the settlement of Lambs Lane itself, but there are two listings to the south in Melford Road:

- Dales Farmhouse - British Listed Buildings
- Little West Farm - British Listed Buildings

NB: The above property details usually represent the names and addresses that were used at the time that the buildings were listed. In some instances the name of the building may have changed over the intervening years.

== Gallery ==
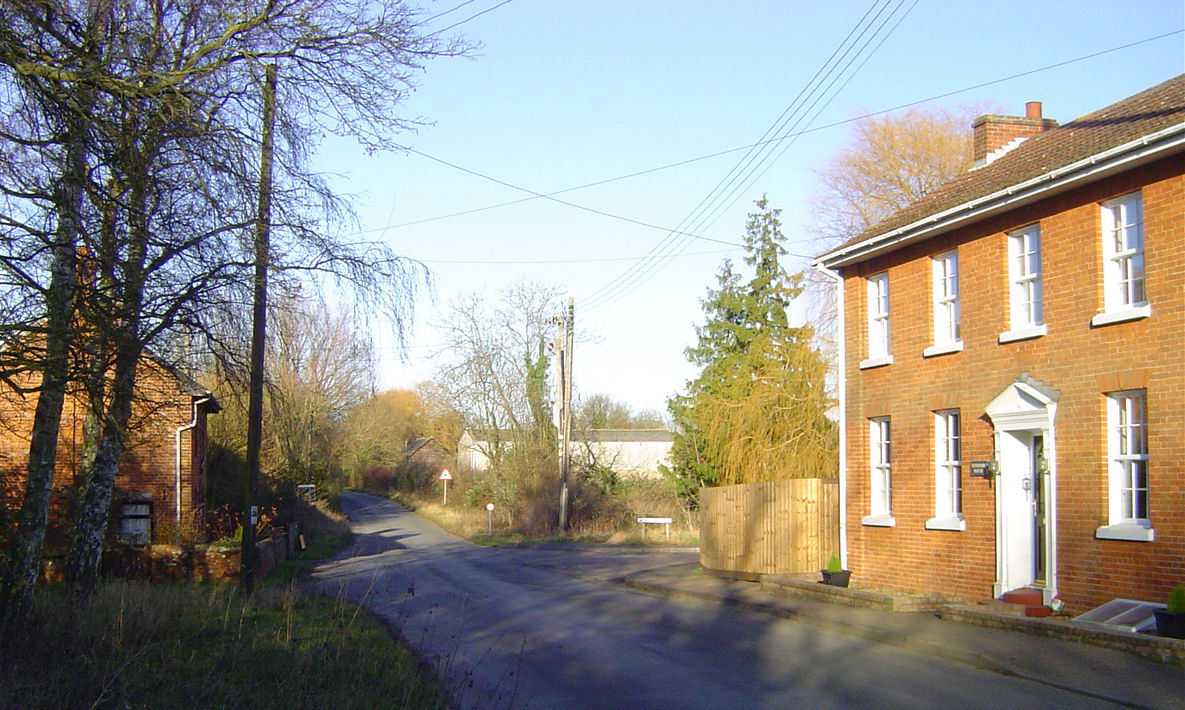
The edge of the Lambs Lane settlement.

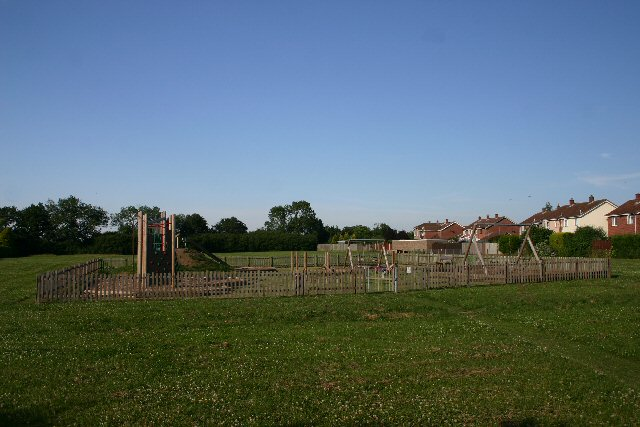
Lawshall Community Playground.
