= Shimpling =

Village in Suffolk, England

Coordinates: 52.12952°N 0.71793°E

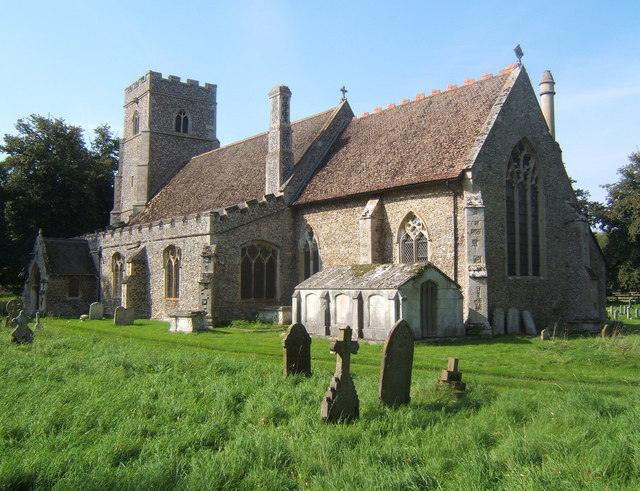
- St George's parish church

- Location within Suffolk
- Population: 431 (2011)
- OS grid reference: TL8651
- District: Babergh
- Shire county: Suffolk
- Region: East
- Country: England
- Sovereign state: United Kingdom
- Post town: BURY ST EDMUNDS
- Postcode district: IP29
- Dialling code: 01284
- Police: Suffolk
- Fire: Suffolk
- Ambulance: East of England
- UK Parliament: South Suffolk

Shimpling is a village and civil parish in south Suffolk, England. About 7 miles (11 km) from Bury St Edmunds, it is part of Babergh district. The village is formed from two halves, the newer Shimpling Street and about 2 miles (3 km) away the old village of Shimpling. The village has a Church of England parish church, where supermodel Claudia Schiffer and film producer Matthew Vaughn were married on 25 May 2002.

== History ==
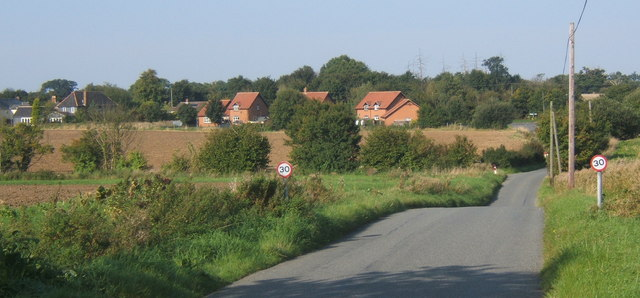
Lane west of Shimpling Street

Shimpling is in Suffolk countryside surrounded by arable farmland. It is between Sudbury and Bury St Edmunds and historically its residents have made their living from farming although other occupations included those of blacksmith, miller, carpenter, shopkeeper, beer seller, teacher and so on. Now there is no shop nor smithy, the school was closed along with the post office and police station. However the parish retains the three staples of life in their thriving community - the church, the pub and the village hall.

The Harleston of Harleston, Norfolk, family had a manor here in the 15th century.

Thomas Hallifax, a London banker, and his family were great benefactors of Shimpling and the surrounding area. They arrived in the early 19th century and purchased many Shimpling properties and farms and lived in Chadacre Hall (built in 1835). Over time they built houses, the school, the schoolhouse, the coal house and made extensive renovations to the church.

The Chadacre Hall estate of 2,300 acres, including 22 farms and 54 houses, was finally sold in 1918. The hall later became an agricultural institute which closed in 1989 and was eventually purchased by David Hart.

The Shimpling sub post office was opened in 1852 and was eventually closed in the early 1970s. However, the service was at one time moved to a different house in The Street.

The village is depicted in Thomas Gainsborough's 1752 work, showing John Plampin in Chadacre Park looking towards Lawshall. The oil painting is on display at the National Gallery.

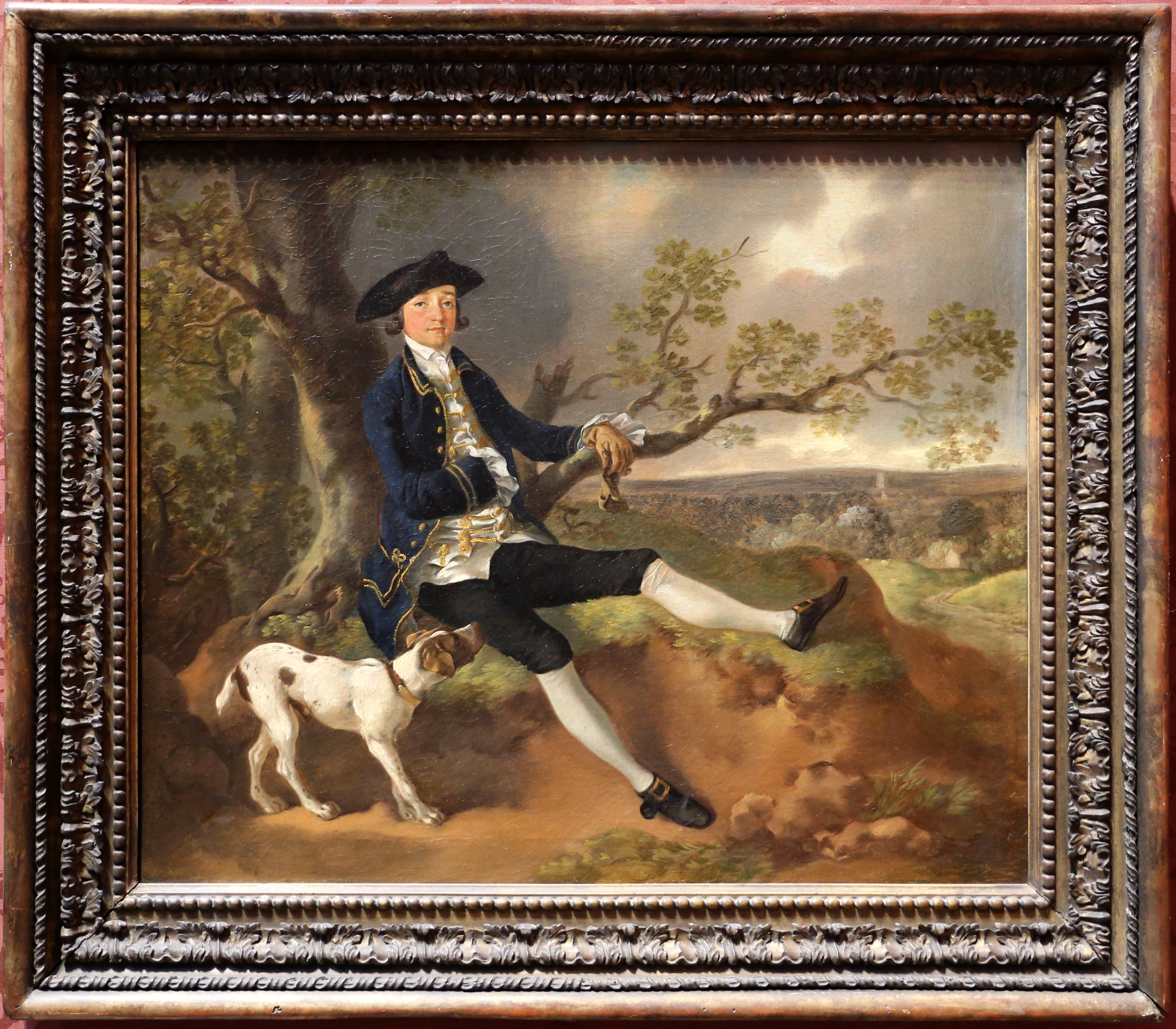
John Plampin of Chadacre Hall by Thomas Gainsborough on display at the National Gallery.

== Governance ==
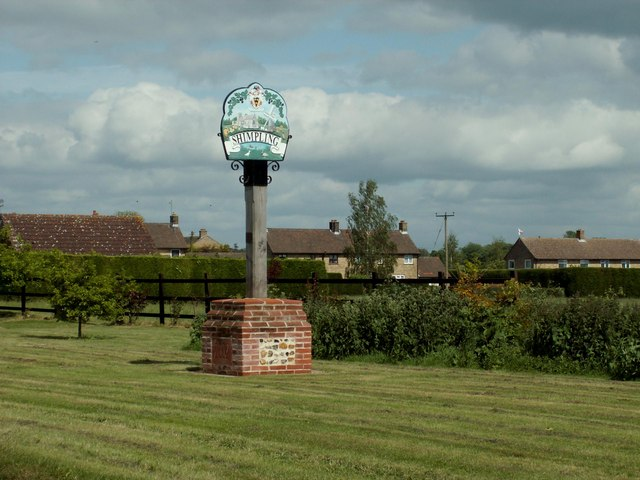
Village sign in Shimpling

Shimpling lies in the Babergh district of the shire county of Suffolk. The three tiers of local government are administered by Suffolk County Council, Babergh District Council, and Shimpling Parish Council, which comprises 7 elected members.

== Community Facilities ==
St George's parish church is approached by an avenue of lime trees from Rectory Lane. The church is 12th-century, with a round tower and late 13th-century chancel. There is a canonical sundial on the south wall. The nave has Perpendicular Gothic windows that were inserted in the 15th century. The building was restored in the 1860s. The windows have some 14th- and 15th-century stained glass, and a window by Henry Holliday (1839–1927) depicts the Presentation of Jesus at the Temple.

Shimpling contains one pub, The Bush, a 16th-century timbered building which has been a public house since at least 1840. It used to have a thatched roof until the first world war when it was replaced with tiles. Shimpling Village Hall hosts Parish Council and Women's Institute meetings, plus a range of other events which are managed by the Village Hall committee.

In October 2010 a children's play park was opened adjacent to Hallifax Place. There is also a recreation ground at Shimpling Road, Lawshall, in fairly close proximity.

== Planning ==
In the adopted Babergh Local Plan Alteration No. 2 (2006) the Built-up area boundary is defined for Shimpling Street with no sites allocated for new residential development. Areas of Visual and/or Recreational Amenity are also defined which protect important open space, visually important gaps in the street scene and recreational facilities.

Much of the parish south of Shimpling Street is within an area defined as Special Landscape Area. In addition parts of the Sites of Special Scientific Interest detailed below are defined within the parish.

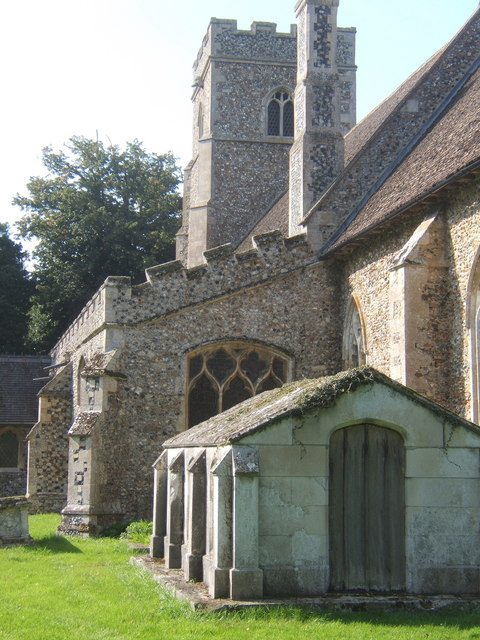
Detail of St George's Church

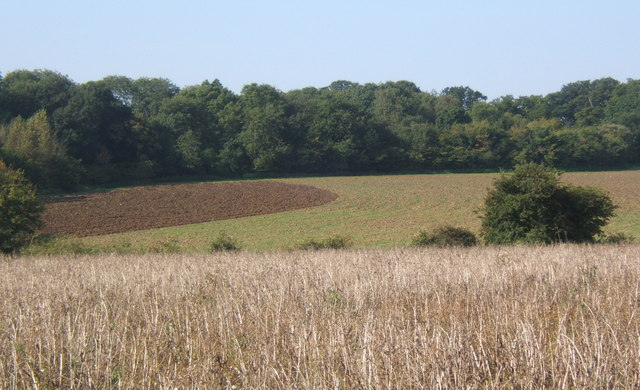
Chadacre Woods

== Environment ==
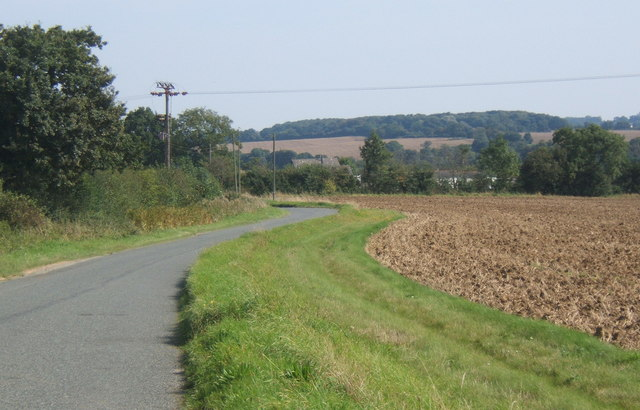
Lane to Shimpling from Stanstead

Within the Suffolk Landscape Character Assessment the parish of Shimpling is within an area defined as Undulating ancient farmlands, Ancient rolling farmlands, and Rolling valley farmlands. The parish contains parts of two SSSIs which are defined as ancient woodlands, Frithy and Chadacre Woods and Kentwell Woods.

== Economy ==
Giffords Hall Vineyard & Wines is located in the parish of Shimpling near the village of Hartest between Bury St Edmunds and Sudbury. They currently have 12 Acres of vines under cultivation with five grape varieties. They also produce wine for retail.

== Transport ==
Shimpling is served by a bus service on Wednesdays operated by Chambers (Sponsored by Suffolk County Council).

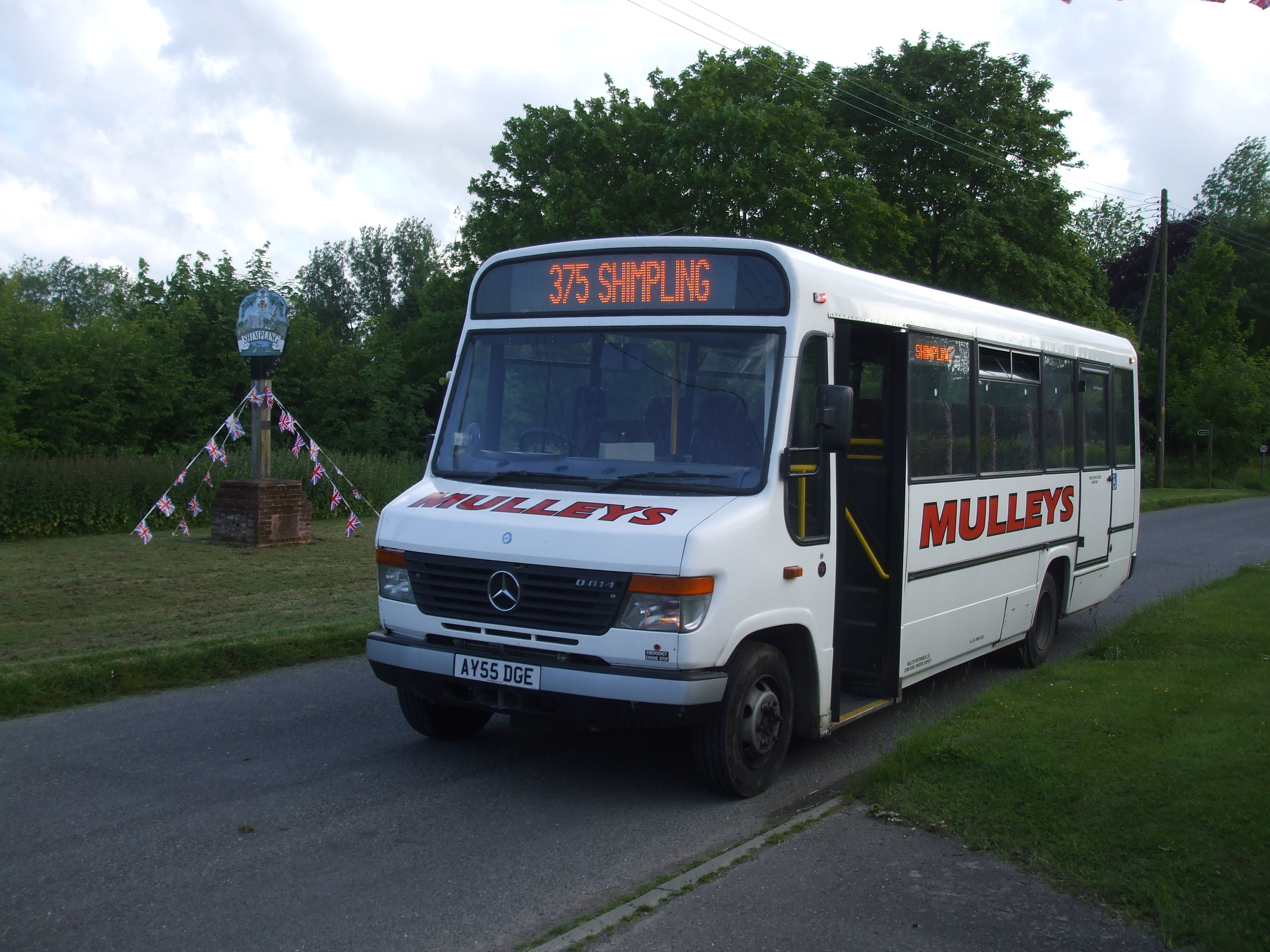
Mulleys bus at Shimpling, Suffolk (23 May 2014)

Service 375 - Alpheton-Bridge Street-Shimpling-Shimpling Street-Cockfield-Lawshall-Hawstead-Nowton-Bury St Edmunds

http://www.suffolkonboard.com/buses/bus-timetables-by-service-number

== Education ==
Thomas Hallifax built Shimpling Girls' School in 1841 and in 1871 his daughter added the boys section. The school was in use for almost 150 years until it was finally closed in 1989 when the remaining 29 pupils were moved to Lawshall. Children in Shimpling have to travel outside the village for school, typically to Lawshall, Hardwick, and Bury St Edmunds.

== Demography ==
According to the Office for National Statistics, at the time of the United Kingdom Census 2001, Shimpling had a population of 395 with 162 households.

=== Population change ===
Population growth in Shimpling from 1801 to 1891
Year	1801	1811	1821	1831	1841	1851	1881	1891
Population	441	393	450	496	517	470	491	464
Source: A Vision of Britain Through Time

Population growth in Shimpling from 1901 to 2001
Year	1901	1911	1921	1931	1951	1961	2001
Population	410	390	381	321	345	329	395
Source: A Vision of Britain Through Time

== Notable former residents ==
- Sir Robert Gardiner (Chief Justice) who was Lord Chief Justice of Ireland from 1586 to 1604, was born in Shimpling in 1540.
- David Hart (4 February 1944 — 5 January 2011) - was an adviser to Margaret Thatcher, a British writer and businessman who lived at Chadacre Hall.
