= Brentwood Borough Council elections =

Local government elections in Essex, England

One third of Brentwood Borough Council in Essex, England is elected each year, followed by one year where there is an election to Essex County Council. Since the last boundary changes in 2002, 37 councillors have been elected from 15 wards.

== Council elections ==
- 1973 Brentwood District Council election
- 1976 Brentwood District Council election (New ward boundaries)
- 1979 Brentwood District Council election
- 1980 Brentwood District Council election
- 1982 Brentwood District Council election
- 1983 Brentwood District Council election
- 1984 Brentwood District Council election
- 1986 Brentwood District Council election
- 1987 Brentwood District Council election (District boundary changes took place but the number of seats remained the same)
- 1988 Brentwood District Council election
- 1990 Brentwood District Council election
- 1991 Brentwood District Council election
- 1992 Brentwood District Council election
- 1994 Brentwood Borough Council election (Borough boundary changes took place but the number of seats remained the same)
- 1995 Brentwood Borough Council election
- 1996 Brentwood Borough Council election
- 1998 Brentwood Borough Council election
- 1999 Brentwood Borough Council election
- 2000 Brentwood Borough Council election
- 2002 Brentwood Borough Council election (New ward boundaries)
- 2003 Brentwood Borough Council election
- 2004 Brentwood Borough Council election
- 2006 Brentwood Borough Council election
- 2007 Brentwood Borough Council election
- 2008 Brentwood Borough Council election
- 2010 Brentwood Borough Council election
- 2011 Brentwood Borough Council election
- 2012 Brentwood Borough Council election
- 2014 Brentwood Borough Council election
- 2015 Brentwood Borough Council election
- 2016 Brentwood Borough Council election
- 2018 Brentwood Borough Council election
- 2019 Brentwood Borough Council election
- 2021 Brentwood Borough Council election
- 2022 Brentwood Borough Council election
- 2023 Brentwood Borough Council election
- 2024 Brentwood Borough Council election (New ward boundaries)
- 2026 Brentwood Borough Council election

== Results maps ==
2002 results map

2003 results map

2004 results map

2006 results map

2007 results map

2008 results map

2010 results map

2011 results map

2012 results map

2014 results map

2015 results map

2016 results map

2018 results map

2019 results map

2021 results map

2022 results map

2023 results map

2024 results map

2026 results map

== By-election results ==
=== 1994-1998 ===
Hook End & Wyatts Green By-Election – 10 October 1996
| Party | Candidate | Votes | % | ±% |
|---|---|---|---|---|
| Conservative | | 542 | 72.7 | |
| Liberal Democrats | | 150 | 20.1 | |
| Labour | | 54 | 7.2 | |
| Majority | | 392 | 52.6 | |
| Turnout | | 746 | | |
| Conservative hold | | Swing | | |

=== 1998-2002 ===
Hutton South By-Election – 9 July 1998
| Party | Candidate | Votes | % | ±% |
|---|---|---|---|---|
| Conservative | Francis Kenny | 484 | 36.0 | −27.3 |
| Liberal Democrats | | 448 | 33.4 | +6.8 |
| Independent Conservative | | 351 | 26.1 | +26.1 |
| Labour | | 60 | 4.5 | −5.5 |
| Majority | | 36 | 2.6 | |
| Turnout | | 1,343 | 25.0 | |
| Conservative hold | | Swing | -17.1 | |

Ingatestone & Fryerning By-Election – 7 June 2001
| Party | Candidate | Votes | % | ±% |
|---|---|---|---|---|
| Conservative | | 1,325 | 51.2 | −7.9 |
| Liberal Democrats | | 818 | 31.6 | −1.0 |
| Labour | | 326 | 12.6 | +4.4 |
| Green | | 117 | 4.5 | +4.5 |
| Majority | | 360 | 31.6 | |
| Turnout | | 507 | | |
| Conservative gain from Liberal Democrats | | Swing | -4.5 | |

=== 2002-2006 ===
Pilgrims Hatch By-Election – 10 February 2005
| Party | Candidate | Votes | % | ±% |
|---|---|---|---|---|
| Liberal Democrats | Anne Long | 874 | 54.2 | +10.7 |
| Conservative | Antony Williams | 640 | 39.7 | −8.5 |
| Labour | Michael Le-Surf | 98 | 6.1 | −1.3 |
| Majority | | 234 | 14.5 | +9.8 |
| Turnout | | 1,612 | 36.3 | −5.3 |
| Liberal Democrats hold | | Swing | +9.6 | |

=== 2006-2010 ===
Pilgrims Hatch By-Election – 1 March 2007
| Party | Candidate | Votes | % | ±% |
|---|---|---|---|---|
| Liberal Democrats | David Kendall | 712 | 50.3 | +0.6 |
| Conservative | Keith Sparling | 651 | 46.0 | +1.2 |
| Labour | Michele Wigram | 53 | 3.7 | −1.7 |
| Majority | | 61 | 4.3 | −0.6 |
| Turnout | | 1,416 | 31.8 | −9.8 |
| Liberal Democrats gain from Conservative | | Swing | +4.6 | |

Hutton South By-Election – 30 October 2008
| Party | Candidate | Votes | % | ±% |
|---|---|---|---|---|
| Conservative | Mark Reed | 686 | 73.3 | −5.1 |
| Liberal Democrats | Linda Price | 199 | 21.3 | +6.4 |
| Labour | Gareth Barrett | 50 | 5.7 | −1 |
| Majority | | 487 | 52 | 11.5 |
| Turnout | | 942 | 31.2 | 6.8 |
| Conservative hold | | Swing | -17.1 | |

Hutton South By-Election – 4 June 2009
| Party | Candidate | Votes | % | ±% |
|---|---|---|---|---|
| Conservative | Roger Hirst | 1010 | 74.6 | −5.6 |
| Liberal Democrats | Linda Price | 232 | 17.1 | +3.4 |
| Labour | Cornelius Maxey | 95 | 7 | +0.9 |
| Majority | | 778 | 57.5 | −9.1 |
| Turnout | | 1354 | 44.8 | +0.8 |
| Conservative hold | | Swing | -9.1 | |

=== 2010-2014 ===
Shenfield By-Election – 6 December 2012
| Party | Candidate | Votes | % | ±% |
|---|---|---|---|---|
| Liberal Democrats | Elizabeth Clare Cohen | 728 | 50.7 | −3.3 |
| Conservative | Stephen Edward May | 557 | 38.8 | +0.1 |
| Labour | Richard Millwood | 31 | 2.2 | −14.4 |
| UKIP | David Watt | 119 | 7.8 | +0.9 |
| Majority | | 171 | | |
| Turnout | | 1,436 | 33.4 | |
| Liberal Democrats gain from Conservative | | Swing | | |

=== 2014-2018 ===
Shenfield By-Election – 29 October 2015
| Party | Candidate | Votes | % | ±% |
|---|---|---|---|---|
| Conservative | Jan Pound | 852 | 57.4 | −0.3 |
| Liberal Democrats | Alison Fulcher | 483 | 32.5 | +5.1 |
| UKIP | Peter Sceats | 85 | 5.7 | −2.7 |
| Labour | Cameron Ball | 49 | 3.3 | −3.2 |
| Green | John Hamilton | 16 | 1.1 | +1.1 |
| Majority | | 369 | 24.8 | |
| Turnout | | 1,485 | | |
| Conservative gain from Liberal Democrats | | Swing | | |

=== 2022-2026 ===
Hutton South By-Election – 2 October 2025
| Party | Candidate | Votes | % | ±% |
|---|---|---|---|---|
| Reform | Russell Quirk | 805 | 45.8 | |
| Conservative | Thomas Bridge | 544 | 30.9 | |
| Labour | Jonathan Saunders | 234 | 13.3 | |
| Liberal Democrats | Brenner Munden | 109 | 6.2 | |
| Green | David Hale | 66 | 3.8 | |
| Majority | | 261 | 14.8 | |
| Turnout | | 1,758 | | |
| Reform gain from Conservative | | Swing | | |
