= 2007 Brentwood Borough Council election =

2007 UK local government election

Results of the 2007 Brentwood Borough Council election

Elections to Brentwood Borough Council were held on 3 May 2007. One third of the council was up for election.

After the election, the composition of the council was

- Conservative 28
- Liberal Democrat 6
- Labour 3

== Election result ==
Brentwood Borough Council Election Result 2007
Party	Seats	Gains	Losses	Net gain/loss	Seats %	Votes %	Votes	+/−
Conservative	8	2	0	+2	66.6	54.0	9,707	-5.2
Liberal Democrats	3	0	2	-2	16.6	32.7	5,869	+3.6
Labour	1	0	0	0	8.3	8.3	1,499	-0.4
Independent	0	0	0	0	0	2.8	504	+2.8
UKIP	0	0	0	0	0	2.2	392	-0.9

The swing was 4.4% from the Conservatives to the Liberal Democrats.

== Ward results ==
Brentwood Borough Council elections, 2007: Brentwood North
Party	Candidate	Votes	%	±%
Liberal Democrats	Reg Straw	866	48.6	+10.4
Conservative	Cheralyn Lewis	764	42.9	−7.8
Labour	Julie Morrissey	151	8.5	−2.6
Majority		102	5.7	−6.7
Turnout		1,811	40.1	−5.1
Liberal Democrats hold		Swing	-6.7	

Brentwood Borough Council elections, 2007: Brentwood South
Party	Candidate	Votes	%	±%
Labour	Mike Le-Surf	608	41.4	+0.7
Conservative	Tony Williams	597	40.7	+1.6
Liberal Democrats	Shirley Howe	262	17.9	−2.4
Majority		11	0.7	−0.9
Turnout		1,467	37.6	−5.8
Labour hold		Swing	-0.9	

Brentwood Borough Council elections, 2007: Brentwood West
Party	Candidate	Votes	%	±%
Liberal Democrats	Karen Chilvers	866	52.0	+8.0
Conservative	Michael Golding	722	43.4	−0.8
Labour	Peter Mayo	77	4.6	−0.8
Majority		144	8.6	+2.1
Turnout		1,665	38.7	−4.9
Liberal Democrats hold		Swing	+2.1	

Brentwood Borough Council elections, 2007: Brizes & Doddinghurst
Party	Candidate	Votes	%	±%
Conservative	Keith Sparling	868	50.3	+1.9
Liberal Democrats	Colin Brown	579	33.6	−3.1
UKIP	Yvonne Maguire	204	11.8	0.4
Labour	Barrie Wickerson	74	4.3	0.8
Majority		289	16.8	−20.2
Turnout		1,725	37.55	−6.7
Conservative gain from Liberal Democrats		Swing	+27.5	

Brentwood Borough Council elections, 2007: Herongate, Ingrave & West Horndon
Party	Candidate	Votes	%	±%
Conservative	Gordon MacLellan	854	76.5	−11.8
Liberal Democrats	Ross Carter	193	17.3	+11.7
Labour	Robert Gow	69	6.2	0.1
Majority		661	59.2	−22.9
Turnout		1,116	39.2	−8.8
Conservative hold		Swing	+2.4	

Brentwood Borough Council elections, 2007: Hutton East
Party	Candidate	Votes	%	±%
Conservative	Christopher Hossack	584	63.0	+3.4
Liberal Democrats	Caron Davis	257	27.7	−6.8
Labour	Richard Enever	86	9.3	+3.4
Majority		327	35.3	10.2
Turnout		927	32.94	−8.9
Conservative hold		Swing	+5.7	

Brentwood Borough Council elections, 2007: Hutton North
Party	Candidate	Votes	%	±%
Conservative	Dudley Payne	552	47.6	−12.7
Independent	Graham Soames	504	43.5	+43.5
Labour	Charles Bisson	103	8.9	0.1
Majority		48	4.1	−25.1
Turnout		1,159	37.94	−9.1
Conservative hold		Swing	-28.3	

Brentwood Borough Council elections, 2007: Ingatestone, Fryerning & Mountnessing
Party	Candidate	Votes	%	±%
Conservative	Noelle Hones	1,102	52.8	−12.1
Liberal Democrats	Christopher Dale	717	34.4	+15.5
UKIP	Janette Gulleford	188	9.0	−0.2
Labour	Jane Winter	80	3.8	−3.1
Majority		385	18.4	−37.3
Turnout		2,087	44.84	−1.0
Conservative hold		Swing	-5.4	

Brentwood Borough Council elections, 2007: Pilgrims Hatch
Party	Candidate	Votes	%	±%
Liberal Democrats	Mathew Aspinell	1,010	57.8	+5.5
Conservative	Paula Sparling	670	38.4	+2.0
Labour	Michele Wigram	66	3.8	−7.1
Majority		340	19.5	14.6
Turnout		1,746	39.1	−4.3
Liberal Democrats hold		Swing	+1.8	

Brentwood Borough Council elections, 2007: Shenfield
Party	Candidate	Votes	%	±%
Conservative	Phil Baker	1,254	77.7	+0.7
Liberal Democrats	Anne Long	281	17.4	−0.1
Labour	Ian Wands	79	4.9	−0.6
Majority		973	60.3	0.8
Turnout		1,361	39.4	−6.1
Conservative hold		Swing	+13.3	

Brentwood Borough Council elections, 2007: Tipps Cross
Party	Candidate	Votes	%	±%
Conservative	Madeline Henwood	828	71.2	+9.8
Liberal Democrats	Alan Davies	269	23.1	−8.8
Labour	Paul Skingley	66	5.7	−1.0
Majority		559	48.1	18.6
Turnout		1,163	39.56	−6.5
Conservative hold		Swing	+18.6	

Brentwood Borough Council elections, 2007: Warley
Party	Candidate	Votes	%	±%
Conservative	William Lloyd	882	50.6	−1.8
Liberal Democrats	Jill Hubbard	771	44.2	+8.3
Labour	Richard Margrave	91	5.2	−4.3
Majority		111	6.4	−10.0
Turnout		1,744	41.0	−4.3
Conservative gain from Liberal Democrats		Swing	+3.4	

== Composition of expiring seats before election ==
Ward	Party	Incumbent Elected	Incumbent	Standing again?
Brentwood North	Liberal Democrats	2003	Reginald Straw	Re-elected
Brentwood South	Labour	2003	David Hann	No
Brentwood West	Liberal Democrats	2003	Allan Wheatley	No
Brizes & Doddinghurst	Liberal Democrats	2003	Colin Brown	Yes
Herongate, Ingrave & West Horndon	Conservative	2003	Gordon MacLellan	Re-elected
Hutton East	Conservative	2003	Christopher Hossack	Re-elected
Hutton North	Conservative	2003	Dudley Payne	Re-elected
Ingatestone, Fryerning & Mountnessing	Conservative	2003	Sarah Courage	No
Pilgrims Hatch	Liberal Democrats	2003	Charles Myers	No
Shenfield	Conservative	2003	Philip Baker	Re-elected
Tipps Cross	Conservative	2003	Madeline Henwood	Re-elected
Warley	Liberal Democrats	2003	Jill Hubbard	Yes
