= 2016 Brentwood Borough Council election =

2016 UK local government election

← 2015	5 May 2016	2018 →

13 seats (out of 39) 20 seats needed for a majority
	First party	Second party	Third party
Party	Conservative	Liberal Democrats	Labour
Last election	23	10	2
Seats before	23	10	2
Seats won	23	10	2
Seat change	Steady	Steady	Steady
Popular vote	8,323	4,875	2,130
Percentage	46.5%	27.2%	11.9%
Swing	▼3.4%	▲8.1%	▼0.9%
	Fourth party	Fifth party
Party	Independent	Brentwood First
Last election	1	1
Seats before	1	1
Seats won	1	1
Seat change	Steady	Steady
Popular vote	1,154	N/A
Percentage	6.5%	N/A
Swing	▲3.0%	N/A
- Results of the 2016 Brentwood Borough Council election

The 2016 Brentwood Borough Council election took place on 5 May 2016 to elect members of Brentwood Borough Council in England. This was on the same day as other local elections.

== Ward results ==
=== Brentwood North ===
Brentwood North
Party	Candidate	Votes	%	±%
Liberal Democrats	Alison Fulcher	966	58.9	+25.5
Conservative	Paul Yarwood	410	25.0	−9.4
Labour	Helen Witty	167	10.2	−2.5
Green	John Hamilton	97	5.9	N/A
Majority				
Turnout				
Liberal Democrats hold		Swing		

=== Brentwood South ===
Brentwood South
Party	Candidate	Votes	%	±%
Labour	Julie Morrissey	486	33.9	+4.1
Conservative	Catherine Tierney	478	33.3	−7.9
UKIP	Wilfred Southgate	246	17.1	−2.6
Liberal Democrats	Dominic Naylor	225	15.7	+6.3
Majority				
Turnout				
Labour hold		Swing		

=== Brentwood West ===
Brentwood West
Party	Candidate	Votes	%	±%
Liberal Democrats	Karen Chilvers	886	53.2	+23.0
Conservative	Peter Freeman	536	32.2	−21.9
Labour	Deborah Foster	159	9.5	−6.2
Green	Paul Jeater	86	5.2	N/A
Majority				
Turnout				
Liberal Democrats hold		Swing		

=== Brizes and Doddinghurst ===
Brizes and Doddinghurst
Party	Candidate	Votes	%	±%
Conservative	Roger McCheyne	963	65.1	+8.4
Independent	Peter Sceats	187	12.6	N/A
Liberal Democrats	Jay Laplain	166	11.2	+2.1
Labour	Emma Benson	163	11.0	+2.2
Majority				
Turnout				
Conservative hold		Swing		

=== Hutton Central ===
Hutton Central
Party	Candidate	Votes	%	±%
Conservative	John Kerslake	623	70.1	+8.8
Liberal Democrats	Grace Bell	150	16.9	+6.2
Labour	Susan Kortlandt	116	13.1	+2.3
Majority				
Turnout				
Conservative hold		Swing		

=== Hutton South ===
Hutton South
Party	Candidate	Votes	%	±%
Conservative	Mark Peter Reed	691	65.3	
UKIP	David Watt	185	17.5	
Labour	Toby Joseph Blunsten	108	10.2	
Liberal Democrats	Colin Stuart Brown	71	6.7	
Majority		506	47.8	
Turnout		1,058	34.33	
Conservative hold		Swing		

=== Hutton North ===
Hutton North
Party	Candidate	Votes	%	±%
Conservative	Louise Jane McKinlay	790	73.2	
Labour	Liam Benjamin Preston	167	15.4	
Liberal Democrats	David Green	111	10.3	
Majority				
Turnout		1,079	33.8	
Conservative hold		Swing		

=== Ingatestone, Fryerning and Mountnessing ===
Ingatestone, Fryerning and Mountnessing
Party	Candidate	Votes	%	±%
Conservative	Thomas Bridge	1000	57.5	
UKIP	Alison Alicia Heales	336	19.3	
Labour	Jane Elizabeth Winter	256	14.7	
Liberal Democrats	Rebecca Louise Coleman-Bennett	139	7.99	
Majority		664	38.20	
Turnout		1,739	35.45	
Conservative hold		Swing		

=== Pilgrims Hatch ===
Pilgrims Hatch
Party	Candidate	Votes	%	±%
Liberal Democrats	David Kendall	960	57.9	+13.4
UKIP	Bryan Finegan	296	17.9	−0.5
Conservative	Aaron Hardy	284	17.1	−11.2
Labour	Cameron Ball	118	7.1	−1.7
Majority		664	40.0	
Turnout		1,658	35.6	
Liberal Democrats hold		Swing		

=== Shenfield ===
Shenfield
Party	Candidate	Votes	%	±%
Conservative	James Tumbridge	1,016	59.5	+1.8
Liberal Democrats	Linda Price	430	25.2	−2.2
UKIP	Richard Briggs	165	9.7	+1.3
Labour	Richard Millwood	96	5.6	−0.9
Majority		586	34.3	
Turnout		1,707	40.0	
Conservative gain from Liberal Democrats		Swing		

=== Tipps Cross ===
Tipps Cross
Party	Candidate	Votes	%	±%
Independent	Roger Charles Keeble	687		
Conservative	Aimi Jane Middlehurst	498		
Conservative	Gordon William Frank Cowley	355		
Independent	Tracey Suzanne Thomas	280		
Labour	Michele Anne Wigram	65		
Labour	Eric James Watts	53		
Majority				
Turnout		1,156	36.5	
Independent hold		Swing		
Conservative hold		Swing		

=== Warley ===
Warley
Party	Candidate	Votes	%	±%
Liberal Democrats	Nigel Clarke	771	44.1	+15.5
Conservative	Sim Owolabi	699	40.0	−5.0
Labour	Tim Barrett	176	10.1	−2.4
Green	Wendy Stephen	102	5.8	N/A
Majority		72	4.1	
Turnout		1,748	36.7	
Liberal Democrats gain from Conservative		Swing		
