= 1991 Brentwood District Council election =

1991 UK local government election

The 1991 Brentwood Borough Council election took place on 2 May 1991 to elect members of Brentwood Borough Council in England.

== Results summary ==
1991 Brentwood Borough Council election
Party	This election			Full council			This election		
Party	Seats	Net	Seats %	Other	Total	Total %	Votes	Votes %	+/−
Liberal Democrats	9	▲4	69.2	11	20	51.3	12,077	47.4	+9.2
Conservative	4	▼4	30.8	13	17	43.6	10,318	40.5	+1.2
Labour	0	Steady	0.0	2	2	5.1	2,996	11.7	–6.6
Green	0	Steady	0.0	0	0	0.0	64	0.3	–3.5
Liberal	0	Steady	0.0	0	0	0.0	50	0.2	New

== Ward results ==
=== Brentwood North ===
Brentwood North
Party	Candidate	Votes	%	±%
Liberal Democrats	E. Davis	1,173	49.1	
Conservative	A. Hanwell	1,002	42.0	
Labour	R. Goddard	212	8.9	
Majority			7.1	
Turnout			53.7	
Liberal Democrats hold		Swing		

=== Brentwood South ===
Brentwood South
Party	Candidate	Votes	%	±%
Liberal Democrats	M. Hogan	911	37.5	
Labour	J. Keohane	825	34.0	
Conservative	P. Dashwood-Quick	691	28.5	
Majority			3.5	
Turnout			59.0	
Liberal Democrats gain from Conservative		Swing		

=== Brentwood West ===
Brentwood West
Party	Candidate	Votes	%	±%
Liberal Democrats	D. Kendall	1,275	61.9	
Conservative	G. Smith	654	31.8	
Labour	M. Coule	130	6.3	
Majority			30.1	
Turnout			52.5	
Liberal Democrats gain from Conservative		Swing		

=== Brizes & Doddinghurst ===
Brizes & Doddinghurst
Party	Candidate	Votes	%	±%
Liberal Democrats	V. Cook	1,313	49.8	
Conservative	J. Parrish	1,076	40.8	
Labour	A. Wilson	196	7.4	
Liberal	P. Reed	50	1.9	
Majority			9.0	
Turnout			53.0	
Liberal Democrats gain from Conservative		Swing		

=== Herongate & Ingrave ===
Herongate & Ingrave
Party	Candidate	Votes	%	±%
Conservative	R. Booth	464	50.5	
Liberal Democrats	W. Thompson	397	43.2	
Labour	R. Gow	57	6.2	
Majority			7.3	
Turnout			55.8	
Conservative hold		Swing		

=== Hutton East ===
Hutton East
Party	Candidate	Votes	%	±%
Liberal Democrats	V. Russell	911	51.7	
Conservative	C. Colley	555	31.5	
Labour	C. Elphick	295	16.8	
Majority			20.2	
Turnout			48.0	
Liberal Democrats gain from Conservative		Swing		

=== Hutton North ===
Hutton North
Party	Candidate	Votes	%	±%
Liberal Democrats	P. Billinge	1,067	55.6	
Conservative	T. Sibley	724	37.7	
Labour	M. Burgess	128	6.7	
Majority			17.9	
Turnout			60.6	
Liberal Democrats hold		Swing		

=== Hutton South ===
Hutton South
Party	Candidate	Votes	%	±%
Conservative	A. Braid	1,575	69.5	
Liberal Democrats	G. Chapman	470	20.8	
Labour	C. Brown	220	9.7	
Majority			48.7	
Turnout			44.4	
Conservative hold		Swing		

=== Ingatestone & Fryerning ===
Ingatestone & Fryerning
Party	Candidate	Votes	%	±%
Liberal Democrats	E. Bottomley	1,421	67.0	
Conservative	J. Mullooly	540	25.4	
Labour	R. Tattersall	97	4.6	
Green	C. Bartley	64	3.0	
Majority			41.6	
Turnout			54.6	
Liberal Democrats hold		Swing		

=== Mountnessing ===
Mountnessing
Party	Candidate	Votes	%	±%
Liberal Democrats	D. Gottesmann	443	77.9	
Conservative	D. Evans	103	18.1	
Labour	D. Green	23	4.0	
Majority			59.8	
Turnout			59.9	
Liberal Democrats hold		Swing		

=== Pilgrims Hatch ===
Pilgrims Hatch
Party	Candidate	Votes	%	±%
Liberal Democrats	C. Myers	1,311	56.8	
Conservative	J. Gray	684	29.6	
Labour	L. Southgate	312	13.5	
Majority			27.2	
Turnout			45.3	
Liberal Democrats hold		Swing		

=== Shenfield ===
Shenfield
Party	Candidate	Votes	%	±%
Conservative	A. Galbraith	1,211	61.1	
Liberal Democrats	S. Saunders	598	30.2	
Labour	G. Page	172	8.7	
Majority			30.9	
Turnout			47.0	
Conservative hold		Swing		

=== Warley ===
Warley
Party	Candidate	Votes	%	±%
Conservative	A. Earl	1,039	48.2	
Liberal Democrats	M. Wild	787	36.5	
Labour	T. Acton	329	15.3	
Majority			11.7	
Turnout			46.4	
Conservative hold		Swing		
