= 1994 Brentwood Borough Council election =

1994 UK local government election

The 1994 Brentwood Borough Council election took place on 5 May 1994 to elect members of Brentwood Borough Council in England.

== Results summary ==
1994 Brentwood Borough Council election
Party	This election			Full council			This election		
Party	Seats	Net	Seats %	Other	Total	Total %	Votes	Votes %	+/−
Liberal Democrats	10	▲2	76.9	16	26	66.7	12,386	52.5	+7.5
Conservative	2	▼2	15.4	10	12	30.8	7,601	32.2	–14.2
Labour	1	Steady	7.7	0	1	2.6	3,114	13.2	+5.0
Green	0	Steady	0.0	0	0	0.0	366	1.6	+1.3
Independent	0	Steady	0.0	0	0	0.0	117	0.5	New

== Ward results ==
=== Brentwood North ===
Brentwood North
Party	Candidate	Votes	%	±%
Liberal Democrats	B. Aspinell	1,268	59.2	
Conservative	A. Hanwell	536	25.0	
Labour	R. Goddard	259	12.1	
Green	F. Seckleman	80	3.7	
Majority			34.2	
Turnout			49.5	
Liberal Democrats hold		Swing		

=== Brentwood South ===
Brentwood South
Party	Candidate	Votes	%	±%
Labour	D. Minns	975	46.5	
Liberal Democrats	D. Rookard	593	28.3	
Conservative	J. Holiday	446	21.3	
Green	J. Hedges	81	3.9	
Majority			18.2	
Turnout			50.7	
Labour hold		Swing		

=== Brentwood West ===
Brentwood West
Party	Candidate	Votes	%	±%
Liberal Democrats	S. Higgins	1,250	67.5	
Conservative	J. Underwood	381	20.6	
Labour	I. Wands	163	8.8	
Green	M. Willis	57	3.1	
Majority			46.9	
Turnout			47.6	
Liberal Democrats hold		Swing		

=== Brizes & Doddinghurst ===
Brizes & Doddinghurst
Party	Candidate	Votes	%	±%
Liberal Democrats	M. Crouch	1,355	60.3	
Conservative	A. Enkel	689	30.6	
Labour	R. Gow	204	9.1	
Majority			29.7	
Turnout			44.5	
Liberal Democrats hold		Swing		

=== Hutton East ===
Hutton East
Party	Candidate	Votes	%	±%
Liberal Democrats	R. Davies	878	61.7	
Conservative	G. Taylor	297	20.9	
Labour	P. Morgan	249	17.5	
Majority			40.8	
Turnout			39.1	
Liberal Democrats hold		Swing		

=== Hutton North ===
Hutton North
Party	Candidate	Votes	%	±%
Liberal Democrats	D. Watson	930	52.6	
Conservative	N. Stevenson	598	33.8	
Labour	C. Maxey	122	6.9	
Independent	R. Farrow	117	6.6	
Majority			18.8	
Turnout			53.4	
Liberal Democrats gain from Conservative		Swing		

=== Hutton South ===
Hutton South
Party	Candidate	Votes	%	±%
Conservative	A. Slaymark	1,296	58.2	
Liberal Democrats	G. Chapman	734	33.0	
Labour	B. Burns	196	8.8	
Majority			25.2	
Turnout			43.2	
Conservative hold		Swing		

=== Ingatestone & Fryerning ===
Ingatestone & Fryerning
Party	Candidate	Votes	%	±%
Liberal Democrats	C. Dale	1,277	59.8	
Conservative	L. Boyce	625	29.3	
Labour	R. Fletcher	167	7.8	
Green	C. Bartley	65	3.0	
Majority			30.5	
Turnout			55.1	
Liberal Democrats hold		Swing		

=== Pilgrims Hatch ===
Pilgrims Hatch
Party	Candidate	Votes	%	±%
Liberal Democrats	A. Long	1,381	63.8	
Conservative	J. Gray	523	24.2	
Labour	J. Alexander	261	12.1	
Majority			39.6	
Turnout			43.1	
Liberal Democrats hold		Swing		

=== Shenfield ===
Shenfield
Party	Candidate	Votes	%	±%
Conservative	K. Bathe	1,106	55.9	
Liberal Democrats	C. Pease	658	33.3	
Labour	H. Dawkes	131	6.6	
Green	B. Lankester	83	4.2	
Majority			22.6	
Turnout			46.4	
Conservative hold		Swing		

=== South Weald ===
South Weald
Party	Candidate	Votes	%	±%
Liberal Democrats	J. Shawcross	542	81.5	
Conservative	N. Weeks	99	14.9	
Labour	I. Davidson	24	3.6	
Majority			66.6	
Turnout			60.0	
Liberal Democrats hold		Swing		

=== Warley ===
Warley
Party	Candidate	Votes	%	±%
Liberal Democrats	C. Robins	984	45.2	
Conservative	V. Young	876	40.3	
Labour	C. Elphick	315	14.5	
Majority			4.9	
Turnout			46.6	
Liberal Democrats gain from Conservative		Swing		

=== West Horndon ===
West Horndon
Party	Candidate	Votes	%	±%
Liberal Democrats	M. Boggis	536	75.2	
Conservative	D. Morley	129	18.1	
Labour	L. Southgate	48	6.7	
Majority			57.1	
Turnout			61.7	
Liberal Democrats hold		Swing		
