= 1990 Brentwood District Council election =

1990 UK local government election

The 1990 Brentwood Borough Council election took place on 3 May 1990 to elect members of Brentwood Borough Council in England.

== Results summary ==
1990 Brentwood Borough Council election
Party	This election			Full council			This election		
Party	Seats	Net	Seats %	Other	Total	Total %	Votes	Votes %	+/−
Conservative	4	▼2	30.8	17	21	53.8	10,734	39.3	
Liberal Democrats	8	▲2	61.5	8	16	41.0	10,439	38.2	
Labour	1	Steady	7.7	1	2	5.1	5,006	18.3	
Green	0	Steady	0.0	0	0	0.0	1,037	3.8	
Independent	0	Steady	0.0	0	0	0.0	114	0.4	

== Ward results ==
=== Brentwood North ===
Brentwood North
Party	Candidate	Votes	%	±%
Liberal Democrats	B. Aspinell	1,167	45.5	
Conservative	K. Ashton	922	35.9	
Labour	R. Goddard	372	14.5	
Green	J. Smith	105	4.1	
Majority			9.6	
Turnout			55.1	
Liberal Democrats hold		Swing		

=== Brentwood South ===
Brentwood South
Party	Candidate	Votes	%	±%
Labour	D. Minns	1,325	54.4	
Conservative	T. Sibley	676	27.7	
Liberal Democrats	S. Moulds	326	13.4	
Green	K. Smith	110	4.5	
Majority			26.7	
Turnout			57.0	
Labour hold		Swing		

=== Brentwood West ===
Brentwood West
Party	Candidate	Votes	%	±%
Liberal Democrats	S. Higgins	980	45.4	
Conservative	P. Adams	751	34.8	
Labour	L. Southgate	327	15.2	
Green	M. Willis	100	4.6	
Majority			10.6	
Turnout			54.5	
Liberal Democrats gain from Conservative		Swing		

=== Brizes & Doddinghurst ===
Brizes & Doddinghurst
Party	Candidate	Votes	%	±%
Liberal Democrats	M. Moore	1,144	45.5	
Conservative	E. Hornsblow	1,000	39.8	
Labour	R. Gow	257	10.2	
Green	J. Brindley	111	4.4	
Majority			5.7	
Turnout			50.1	
Liberal Democrats hold		Swing		

=== Hutton East ===
Hutton East
Party	Candidate	Votes	%	±%
Liberal Democrats	R. Davies	969	46.7	
Conservative	P. Streeter	573	27.6	
Labour	C. Elphick	493	23.8	
Green	P. Wyatt	38	1.8	
Majority			19.1	
Turnout			56.1	
Liberal Democrats gain from Conservative		Swing		

=== Hutton North ===
Hutton North
Party	Candidate	Votes	%	±%
Conservative	R. French	853	44.0	
Liberal Democrats	P. Freeman	765	39.4	
Labour	M. Burges	303	15.6	
Independent	F. Seckleman	19	1.0	
Majority			4.6	
Turnout			62.5	
Conservative hold		Swing		

=== Hutton South ===
Hutton South
Party	Candidate	Votes	%	±%
Conservative	A. Slaymark	1,596	66.1	
Labour	C. Brown	336	13.9	
Liberal Democrats	G. Chapman	325	13.5	
Green	B. Lankester	157	6.5	
Majority			52.2	
Turnout			47.4	
Conservative hold		Swing		

=== Ingatestone & Fryerning ===
Ingatestone & Fryerning
Party	Candidate	Votes	%	±%
Liberal Democrats	C. Dale	1,434	61.1	
Conservative	J. Mullooly	746	31.8	
Labour	J. Lewin	89	3.8	
Green	W. Boulton	77	3.3	
Majority			29.3	
Turnout			59.4	
Liberal Democrats hold		Swing		

=== Pilgrims Hatch ===
Pilgrims Hatch
Party	Candidate	Votes	%	±%
Liberal Democrats	A. Long	1,251	46.5	
Conservative	J. Gray	766	28.5	
Labour	R. Cadey	578	21.5	
Green	C. Wyatt	95	3.5	
Majority			18.0	
Turnout			52.4	
Liberal Democrats hold		Swing		

=== Shenfield ===
Shenfield
Party	Candidate	Votes	%	±%
Conservative	N. Thain	1,260	58.2	
Liberal Democrats	S. Saunders	512	23.6	
Labour	G. Page	236	10.9	
Green	R. Lankester	102	4.7	
Independent	I. Chisholm	56	2.6	
Majority			34.6	
Turnout			50.9	
Conservative hold		Swing		

=== South Weald ===
South Weald
Party	Candidate	Votes	%	±%
Liberal Democrats	J. Shawcross	516	71.5	
Conservative	N. Ellenby	155	21.5	
Labour	M. Mwangi	34	4.7	
Green	D. Hulme	17	2.4	
Majority			50.0	
Turnout			64.0	
Liberal Democrats hold		Swing		

=== Warley ===
Warley
Party	Candidate	Votes	%	±%
Conservative	J. Struthers	1,090	45.2	
Liberal Democrats	E. Davis	631	26.2	
Labour	T. Acton	580	24.0	
Green	C. Bartley	111	4.6	
Majority			19.0	
Turnout			51.5	
Conservative hold		Swing		

=== West Horndon ===
West Horndon
Party	Candidate	Votes	%	±%
Liberal Democrats	M. Boggis	419	46.9	
Conservative	P. Dashwood-Quick	346	38.7	
Labour	D. Lewin	76	8.5	
Independent	E. Stirland	39	4.4	
Green	J. Walsh	14	1.6	
Majority			8.2	
Turnout			74.8	
Liberal Democrats hold		Swing		
