= 2000 Brentwood Borough Council election =

2000 UK local government election

Elections to Brentwood Council were held on 4 May 2000. One third of the council was up for election and the Liberal Democrat party kept overall control of the council.

After the election, the composition of the council was

- Liberal Democrat 25
- Conservative 10
- Labour 2
- Independent 1
- Liberal 1

== Election result ==
Brentwood local election result 2000
Party	Seats	Gains	Losses	Net gain/loss	Seats %	Votes %	Votes	+/−
Liberal Democrats	8			0	57.1			
Conservative	5			0	35.7			
Labour	1			0	7.1			

Preceded by 1999 Brentwood Council election	Brentwood local elections	Succeeded by 2002 Brentwood Council election
