= 2006 Brentwood Borough Council election =

2006 UK local government election

Results of the 2006 Brentwood Borough Council election

Elections to Brentwood Borough Council were held on 4 May 2006. One third of the council was up for election. The Conservative Party retained control the council.

After the election, the composition of the council was:

- Conservative 27
- Liberal Democrat 7
- Labour 3

== Election result ==
Brentwood Borough Council Election Result 2006
| Party | Seats | Gains | Losses | Net gain/loss | Seats % | Votes % | Votes | +/− |
|---|---|---|---|---|---|---|---|---|
| Conservative | 11 | 6 | 0 | +6 | 84.6 | 59.2 | 12,441 | +7.0 |
| Liberal Democrats | 1 | 0 | 6 | -6 | 7.7 | 29.1 | 6,117 | -2.5 |
| Labour | 1 | 0 | 0 | 0 | 7.7 | 8.7 | 1,826 | -0.2 |
| UKIP | 0 | 0 | 0 | 0 | 0.0 | 3.1 | 642 | -3.1 |
| Others | 0 | 0 | 0 | 0 | 0.0 | 0.0 | 0 | -1.2 |

The swing was 4.8% from the Liberal Democrats to the Conservatives.

== Ward results ==
Brentwood Borough Council elections, 2006: Brentwood North
| Party | Candidate | Votes | % | ±% |
|---|---|---|---|---|
| Conservative | Russell Quirk | 932 | 47.7 | +7.7 |
| Liberal Democrats | Doris Suckling | 704 | 36.1 | +3.0 |
| Labour | Michael Le-Surf | 204 | 10.5 | +2.2 |
| UKIP | Derek Camp | 112 | 5.7 | −6.0 |
| Majority | | 228 | 11.7 | +4.9 |
| Turnout | | 1,952 | 45.2 | +2.2 |
| Conservative gain from Liberal Democrats | | Swing | +2.8 | |

Brentwood Borough Council elections, 2006: Brentwood South
| Party | Candidate | Votes | % | ±% |
|---|---|---|---|---|
| Labour | David Minns | 666 | 40.7 | +6.4 |
| Conservative | Antony Williams | 639 | 39.0 | +12.7 |
| Liberal Democrats | Deborah Wood | 331 | 20.2 | −2.6 |
| Majority | | 27 | 1.7 | −6.2 |
| Turnout | | 1,636 | 43 | −1.2 |
| Labour hold | | Swing | -3.2 | |

Brentwood Borough Council elections, 2006: Brentwood West
| Party | Candidate | Votes | % | ±% |
|---|---|---|---|---|
| Conservative | Karen Sheehan | 907 | 50.6 | +2.0 |
| Liberal Democrats | David Kendall | 790 | 44.0 | +1.8 |
| Labour | Peter Mayo | 97 | 5.4 | −2.9 |
| Majority | | 117 | 6.5 | 0.0 |
| Turnout | | 1,794 | 43 | +3.1 |
| Conservative gain from Liberal Democrats | | Swing | +0.1 | |

Brentwood Borough Council elections, 2006: Brizes & Doddinghurst
| Party | Candidate | Votes | % | ±% |
|---|---|---|---|---|
| Conservative | Keith Parker | 958 | 48.4 | +15.2 |
| Liberal Democrats | Victoria Cook | 725 | 36.6 | +0.9 |
| UKIP | Yvonne Maguire | 227 | 11.5 | −10.9 |
| Labour | Barrie Wickerson | 69 | 3.5 | −1.3 |
| Majority | | 233 | 11.8 | +9.2 |
| Turnout | | 1,979 | 44 | +3.9 |
| Conservative gain from Liberal Democrats | | Swing | +7.2 | |

Brentwood Borough Council elections, 2006: Herongate, Ingrave & West Horndon
| Party | Candidate | Votes | % | ±% |
|---|---|---|---|---|
| Conservative | Linda Golding | 1,167 | 88.3 | +33.8 |
| Labour | Cornelius Maxey | 81 | 6.1 | −1.5 |
| Liberal Democrats | Garfield Maxius | 74 | 5.6 | −32.0 |
| Majority | | 1,086 | 82.1 | +65.1 |
| Turnout | | 1,322 | 48 | +6.0 |
| Conservative hold | | Swing | +17.7 | |

Brentwood Borough Council elections, 2006: Hutton Central
| Party | Candidate | Votes | % | ±% |
|---|---|---|---|---|
| Conservative | Alan Braid | 990 | 78.5 | +7.2 |
| Liberal Democrats | Shirley Howe | 198 | 15.7 | −3.4 |
| Labour | Richard Margrave | 73 | 5.8 | −3.3 |
| Majority | | 792 | 62.8 | +10.6 |
| Turnout | | 1,261 | 44 | −2.8 |
| Conservative hold | | Swing | +5.3 | |

Brentwood Borough Council elections, 2006: Hutton East
| Party | Candidate | Votes | % | ±% |
|---|---|---|---|---|
| Conservative | Jennifer Monnickendam | 682 | 59.6 | −1.1 |
| Liberal Democrats | Caron Davis | 395 | 34.5 | +5.0 |
| Labour | Charles Bisson | 67 | 5.9 | −3.5 |
| Majority | | 287 | 25.1 | −1.3 |
| Turnout | | 1,144 | 42 | +7.4 |
| Conservative gain from Liberal Democrats | | Swing | -3.1 | |

Brentwood Borough Council elections, 2006: Hutton South
| Party | Candidate | Votes | % | ±% |
|---|---|---|---|---|
| Conservative | Brandon Lewis | 1,046 | 80.2 | +9.0 |
| Liberal Democrats | Jacqueline Anslow | 178 | 13.7 | −7.6 |
| Labour | Rita Anderson | 80 | 6.1 | −0.3 |
| Majority | | 868 | 66.6 | +16.7 |
| Turnout | | 1,304 | 44 | +0.8 |
| Conservative hold | | Swing | +8.3 | |

Brentwood Borough Council elections, 2006: Ingatestone, Fryerning & Mountnessing
| Party | Candidate | Votes | % | ±% |
|---|---|---|---|---|
| Conservative | Richard Harrison | 1,349 | 64.9 | +21.8 |
| Liberal Democrats | Roberta Hall | 392 | 18.9 | −18.0 |
| UKIP | Michael Heaslip | 192 | 9.2 | −3.6 |
| Labour | Jane Winter | 144 | 6.9 | +3.0 |
| Majority | | 957 | 46.1 | +39.9 |
| Turnout | | 2,057 | 45.6 | −3.6 |
| Conservative hold | | Swing | +19.9 | |

Brentwood Borough Council elections, 2006: Pilgrims Hatch
| Party | Candidate | Votes | % | ±% |
|---|---|---|---|---|
| Liberal Democrats | Barry Aspinell | 954 | 49.7 | −4.5 |
| Conservative | Keith Sparling | 860 | 44.8 | +5.1 |
| Labour | Michele Wigram | 104 | 5.4 | −0.7 |
| Majority | | 94 | 4.9 | −9.6 |
| Turnout | | 1,918 | 43 | +6.7 |
| Liberal Democrats hold | | Swing | -4.8 | |

Brentwood Borough Council elections, 2006: Shenfield
| Party | Candidate | Votes | % | ±% |
|---|---|---|---|---|
| Conservative | Lionel Lee | 1,419 | 69.5 | −0.1 |
| Liberal Democrats | Max Gottesmann | 523 | 25.6 | +5.6 |
| Labour | Robert Gow | 101 | 4.9 | −1.6 |
| Majority | | 1,096 | 53.6 | +4.1 |
| Turnout | | 2,043 | 45.4 | −2.0 |
| Conservative hold | | Swing | -2.9 | |

Brentwood Borough Council elections, 2006: South Weald
| Party | Candidate | Votes | % | ±% |
|---|---|---|---|---|
| Conservative | Ann Coe | 493 | 71.8 | +47.3 |
| Liberal Democrats | Julie Stewart | 167 | 24.3 | −49.9 |
| Labour | Sheila Maxey | 27 | 3.9 | +2.6 |
| Majority | | 326 | 47.5 | −2.1 |
| Turnout | | 687 | 49.2 | −0.4 |
| Conservative gain from Liberal Democrats | | Swing | +48.6 | |

Brentwood Borough Council elections, 2006: Warley
| Party | Candidate | Votes | % | ±% |
|---|---|---|---|---|
| Conservative | Janet Pound | 999 | 52.2 | +8.1 |
| Liberal Democrats | Robert Barr | 686 | 35.8 | −5.6 |
| Labour | Peter Anderson | 113 | 5.9 | +0.2 |
| UKIP | Janette Gulleford | 111 | 5.8 | −2.7 |
| Majority | | 313 | 16.4 | +13.7 |
| Turnout | | 1,914 | 45 | −1.4 |
| Conservative gain from Liberal Democrats | | Swing | +6.9 | |

== Composition of expiring seats before election ==
| Ward | Party | Incumbent Elected | Incumbent | Stood? |
|---|---|---|---|---|
| Brentwood North | Liberal Democrats | 2002 | Barry Aspinell | Elected in Pilgrims Hatch |
| Brentwood South | Labour | 2002 | David Minns | Reelected |
| Brentwood West | Liberal Democrats | 2002 | David Kendall | Yes |
| Brizes & Doddinghurst | Liberal Democrats | 2002 | Victoria Cook | Yes |
| Herongate, Ingrave & West Horndon | Conservative | 2002 | Ken Wright | No |
| Hutton Central | Conservative | 2002 | Alan Braid | Reelected |
| Hutton East | Liberal Democrats | 2002 | Alan Davies | No |
| Hutton South | Conservative | 2002 | Brandon Lewis | Reelected |
| Ingatestone, Fryerning & Mountnessing | Conservative | 2002 | Richard Harrison | Reelected |
| Pilgrims Hatch | Liberal Democrats | 2005 | Anne Long | No |
| Shenfield | Conservative | 2004 | Lionel Lee | Reelected |
| South Weald | Liberal Democrats | 2002 | James Shawcross | No |
| Warley | Liberal Democrats | 2002 | Michael Taylor | No |
