= 1996 Brentwood Borough Council election =

1996 UK local government election

The 1996 Brentwood Borough Council election took place on 2 May 1996 to elect members of Brentwood Borough Council in England.

== Results summary ==
1996 Brentwood Borough Council election
Party	This election			Full council			This election		
Party	Seats	Net	Seats %	Other	Total	Total %	Votes	Votes %	+/−
Liberal Democrats	7	▼1	50.0	18	25	64.1	8,820	42.8	–5.7
Conservative	6	Steady	42.9	6	12	30.8	7,727	37.5	+7.4
Labour	1	▲1	7.1	1	2	5.1	3,975	19.3	+0.2
Independent Liberal	0	Steady	0.0	0	0	0.0	96	0.5	–0.5

== Ward results ==
=== Blackmore ===
Blackmore
Party	Candidate	Votes	%	±%
Liberal Democrats	L. Harley	222	44.7	
Conservative	P. Reed	183	36.8	
Labour	R. Gow	92	18.5	
Majority			7.9	
Turnout			54.5	
Liberal Democrats gain from Conservative		Swing		

=== Brentwood North ===
Brentwood North
Party	Candidate	Votes	%	±%
Liberal Democrats	R. Straw	828	52.7	
Conservative	J. Underwood	463	29.5	
Labour	R. Goddard	279	17.8	
Majority			23.2	
Turnout			34.8	
Liberal Democrats hold		Swing		

=== Brentwood South ===
Brentwood South
Party	Candidate	Votes	%	±%
Labour	C. Elphick	857	47.4	
Liberal Democrats	E. Hine	606	33.5	
Conservative	J. Holiday	346	19.1	
Majority			13.9	
Turnout			44.3	
Labour gain from Liberal Democrats		Swing		

=== Brentwood West ===
Brentwood West
Party	Candidate	Votes	%	±%
Liberal Democrats	D. Higgins	988	65.7	
Liberal Democrats	B. Sarbutt	874		
Conservative	P. Currie	311	20.7	
Conservative	R. Donnelly	310		
Labour	J. Callaghan	205	13.6	
Labour	P. Mayo	196		
Turnout			39.0	
Liberal Democrats hold		Swing		
Liberal Democrats hold		Swing		

=== Brizes & Doddinghurst ===
Brizes & Doddinghurst
Party	Candidate	Votes	%	±%
Liberal Democrats	C. Brown	901	51.2	
Conservative	K. Galbraith	546	31.0	
Labour	E. Joy	312	17.7	
Majority			20.2	
Turnout			39.0	
Liberal Democrats hold		Swing		

=== Hook End & Wyatts Green ===
Hook End & Wyatts Green
Party	Candidate	Votes	%	±%
Conservative	A. Gunnell	632	75.6	
Liberal Democrats	T. Murray	131	15.7	
Labour	M. Wigram	73	8.7	
Majority			59.9	
Turnout			51.9	
Conservative hold		Swing		

=== Hutton East ===
Hutton East
Party	Candidate	Votes	%	±%
Liberal Democrats	J. Russell	649	55.2	
Labour	M. Oliver	319	27.1	
Conservative	V. Fletcher	208	17.7	
Majority			28.1	
Turnout			32.9	
Liberal Democrats hold		Swing		

=== Hutton North ===
Hutton North
Party	Candidate	Votes	%	±%
Conservative	V. Young	653	43.8	
Liberal Democrats	S. Barnes	468	31.4	
Labour	E. O'Brien	275	18.4	
Independent Liberal	C. Williams	96	6.4	
Majority			12.4	
Turnout			44.0	
Conservative gain from Liberal Democrats		Swing		

=== Hutton South ===
Hutton South
Party	Candidate	Votes	%	±%
Conservative	E. Nicholson	1,098	63.1	
Liberal Democrats	G. Chapman	422	24.3	
Labour	M. Burgess	219	12.6	
Majority			38.8	
Turnout			33.1	
Conservative hold		Swing		

=== Ingatestone & Fryerning ===
Ingatestone & Fryerning
Party	Candidate	Votes	%	±%
Conservative	R. Harrison	807	45.5	
Liberal Democrats	L. Day	759	42.8	
Labour	P. Bartley	207	11.7	
Majority			2.7	
Turnout			45.7	
Conservative hold		Swing		

=== Pilgrims Hatch ===
Pilgrims Hatch
Party	Candidate	Votes	%	±%
Liberal Democrats	H. Bailey	960	55.6	
Labour	L. Southgate	391	22.6	
Conservative	J. Gray	376	21.8	
Majority			33.0	
Turnout			34.6	
Liberal Democrats hold		Swing		

=== Shenfield ===
Shenfield
Party	Candidate	Votes	%	±%
Conservative	V. Fletcher	969	62.3	
Liberal Democrats	P. Goodey	389	25.0	
Labour	M. Owen	197	12.7	
Majority			37.3	
Turnout			37.0	
Conservative hold		Swing		

=== Warley ===
Warley
Party	Candidate	Votes	%	±%
Conservative	J. Thompson	825	45.8	
Liberal Democrats	J. Pearson	623	34.6	
Labour	T. Lee	353	19.6	
Majority			11.2	
Turnout			39.5	
Conservative hold		Swing		
