= 2019 Brentwood Borough Council election =

2019 UK local government election

2019 Brentwood Borough Council Election
← 2018	2 May 2019	2021 →

12 of the 37 seats to Brentwood Borough Council 19 seats needed for a majority

	First party	Second party	Third party
Party	Conservative	Liberal Democrats	Labour
Last election	25 seats, 45.6%	9 seats, 34.5%	2 seats, 14.0%
Seats won	6	5	1
Seats after	20	13	3
Seat change	▼5	▲4	▲1
Popular vote	41.6%	40.9%	10.5%
Swing	▼4.0%	▲6.4%	▼3.5%
	Fourth party
Party	Independent
Last election	1 seats, 4.9%
Seats won	0
Seats after	1
Seat change	Steady
Popular vote	2.8%
Swing	▼2.1%
- Winner of each seat at the 2019 Brentwood Borough Council election
Leader before election
Louise McKinlay
Conservative
Leader after election
Chris Hossack
Conservative

The 2019 Brentwood Borough Council election took place on 2 May 2019 to elect members of Brentwood Borough Council in England. This was on the same day as other local elections.

== Results summary ==
2019 Brentwood Borough Council election
Party	This election			Full council			This election		
Party	Seats	Net	Seats %	Other	Total	Total %	Votes	Votes %	+/−
Conservative	6	▼5	50.0	14	20	54.1	6,836	41.6	-4.0
Liberal Democrats	5	▲4	41.7	8	13	35.1	6,733	40.9	+6.4
Labour	1	▲1	8.3	2	3	8.1	1,719	10.5	-3.5
Independent	0	Steady	0.0	1	1	2.7	464	2.8	-2.1
Green	0	Steady	0.0	0	0	0.0	542	3.3	+2.2
UKIP	0	Steady	0.0	0	0	0.0	155	0.9	New

== Ward results ==
=== Brentwood North ===
Brentwood North
Party	Candidate	Votes	%	±%
Liberal Democrats	Mark Lewis	879	57.0	+5.1
Conservative	Mellissa Slade	362	23.5	−4.8
Labour	Tony Blunsten	155	10.1	−4.1
Green	John Hamilton	145	9.4	+3.8
Majority		517	33.5	
Turnout		1,541	29.0	
Liberal Democrats gain from Conservative		Swing		

=== Brentwood South ===
Brentwood South
Party	Candidate	Votes	%	±%
Labour	Tim Barrett	534	40.5	−1.7
Conservative	Andrew Wiles	477	36.2	−4.4
Liberal Democrats	Brenner Munden	306	23.2	+6.0
Majority		57	4.3	
Turnout		1,317	29.0	
Labour gain from Conservative		Swing		

=== Brentwood West ===
Brentwood West
Party	Candidate	Votes	%	±%
Liberal Democrats	Sarah Cloke	824	48.2	−3.3
Conservative	William Russell	650	38.0	+4.0
Labour	Deborah Foster	123	7.2	−7.3
Green	Karen Smith	114	6.7	New
Majority		174	10.2	
Turnout		1,711	31.0	
Liberal Democrats gain from Conservative		Swing		

=== Brizes & Doddinghurst ===
Brizes & Doddinghurst
Party	Candidate	Votes	%	±%
Conservative	Cliff Poppy	805	55.7	−6.9
Liberal Democrats	Hugh Gorton	557	38.5	+11.2
Labour	David Jobbins	84	5.8	−4.3
Majority		248	17.2	
Turnout		1,446	31.0	
Conservative hold		Swing		

=== Herongate, Ingrave & West Horndon ===
Herongate, Ingrave & West Horndon
Party	Candidate	Votes	%	±%
Conservative	Maria Pearson	635	70.6	+14.1
Liberal Democrats	Anne Long	188	20.9	+17.9
Labour	Richard Millwood	77	8.6	+2.1
Majority		447	49.7	
Turnout		900	31.0	
Conservative hold		Swing		

No Independent candidate as previous (-34.0).

=== Hutton East ===
Hutton East
Party	Candidate	Votes	%	±%
Conservative	Chris Hossack	424	55.4	−1.8
Labour	Francisca Dapp	180	23.5	+5.1
Liberal Democrats	David Green	161	21.0	+6.3
Majority		244	31.9	
Turnout		765	26.0	
Conservative hold		Swing		

No Independent candidate as previous (-9.6).

=== Hutton North ===
Hutton North
Party	Candidate	Votes	%	±%
Conservative	Sandy Tanner	587	61.6	−11.6
Liberal Democrats	Gary Macdonnell	225	23.6	+13.3
Labour	Liam Preston	141	14.8	−0.6
Majority		362	38.0	
Turnout		953	31	
Conservative hold		Swing		

=== Ingatestone, Fryerning & Mountnessing ===
Ingatestone, Fryerning & Mountnessing
Party	Candidate	Votes	%	±%
Conservative	Noelle Hones	825	45.3	−2.5
Liberal Democrats	Darryl Sankey	752	41.3	+2.9
Green	Paul Jeater	162	8.9	+3.3
Labour	Paul Murphy	84	4.6	−5.8
Majority		73	4.0	
Turnout		1,823	37.0	
Conservative hold		Swing		

=== Pilgrims Hatch ===
Pilgrims Hatch
Party	Candidate	Votes	%	±%
Liberal Democrats	Vicky Davies	1,063	71.5	−1.7
Conservative	Kelly Herbert	313	21.0	+2.7
Labour	Patricia Smith	111	7.5	−1.0
Majority		750	50.5	
Turnout		1,487	32.0	
Liberal Democrats hold		Swing		

=== Shenfield ===
Shenfield
Party	Candidate	Votes	%	±%
Liberal Democrats	Andrew Fryd	995	53.9	+15.5
Conservative	Louise Rowlands	780	42.3	−12.8
Labour	June Simmons	70	3.8	−2.7
Majority		215	11.6	
Turnout		1,845	44.0	
Liberal Democrats gain from Conservative		Swing		

=== Tipps Cross ===
Tipps Cross
Party	Candidate	Votes	%	±%
Conservative	Peter Jakobsson	566	52.2	
Independent	Tracey Thomas	464	42.8	
Labour	Marian Jenkins	54	5.0	
Majority		102	9.4	
Turnout		1,084	35.0	
Conservative hold		Swing		

=== Warley ===
Warley
Party	Candidate	Votes	%	±%
Liberal Democrats	Jason Laplain	783	49.7	+14.3
Conservative	Stephen Green	412	26.1	−2.3
UKIP	Kris Hicks	155	9.8	New
Green	Janice Gearon-Simm	121	7.7	New
Labour	Susan Kortlandt	106	6.7	−6.4
Majority		371	23.6	
Turnout		1,577	32.0	
Liberal Democrats gain from Conservative		Swing		
