= 1973 Brentwood District Council election =

1973 English local government election

- 10 May 1973

All 38 seats to Brentwood District Council 20 seats needed for a majority

	First party	Second party
Party	Conservative	Labour
Seats won	25	11
Popular vote	32,661	21,385
Percentage	59.5%	39.0%
	Third party	Fourth party
Party	Liberal	Independent
Seats won	1	1
Popular vote	281	112
Percentage	0.5%	0.2%
Council control after election
Conservative

The 1973 Brentwood District Council election took place on 10 May 1973 to elect members of Brentwood District Council in Essex, England. This was on the same day as other local elections.

This was the inaugural election to the council following its creation by the 1972 Local Government Act.

== Summary ==
=== Election result ===
1973 Brentwood District Council election
Party	Candidates	Seats	Gains	Losses	Net gain/loss	Seats %	Votes %	Votes	+/−
Conservative	37	25	N/A	N/A	N/A	65.8	59.5	32,661	N/A
Labour	31	11	N/A	N/A	N/A	28.9	39.0	21,385	N/A
Liberal	1	1	N/A	N/A	N/A	2.6	0.5	281	N/A
Independent	1	1	N/A	N/A	N/A	2.6	0.2	112	N/A
Communist	4	0	N/A	N/A	N/A	0.0	0.8	413	N/A
