= 1982 Brentwood District Council election =

1982 English local government election

- 6 May 1982

13 out of 39 seats to Brentwood District Council 20 seats needed for a majority

	First party	Second party	Third party
Party	Conservative	Alliance	Labour
Seats won	9	3	1
Seats after	28	8	3
Seat change	▼2	▲2	Steady
Popular vote	12,414	8,990	3,138
Percentage	50.6%	36.6%	12.8%
Swing	▲0.5%	▲12.7%	▼13.3%
Council control before election
Conservative
Council control after election
Conservative

The 1982 Brentwood District Council election took place on 6 May 1982 to elect members of Brentwood District Council in Essex, England. This was on the same day as other local elections.

== Summary ==
=== Election result ===
1982 Brentwood District Council election
Party	This election			Full council			This election		
Party	Seats	Net	Seats %	Other	Total	Total %	Votes	Votes %	+/−
Conservative	9	▼2	69.2	19	28	71.8	12,414	50.6	+0.5
Alliance	3	▲2	23.1	5	8	20.5	8,990	36.6	+12.7
Labour	1	Steady	7.7	2	3	7.7	3,138	12.8	–13.3
