= 1988 Brentwood District Council election =

1988 English local government election

- 5 May 1987

13 out of 39 seats to Brentwood District Council 20 seats needed for a majority

	First party	Second party	Third party
Party	Conservative	SLD	Labour
Seats won	9	3	1
Seats after	21	16	2
Seat change	▼1	▲1	Steady
Popular vote	12,198	8,511	2,799
Percentage	51.1%	35.7%	11.7%
Swing	▲0.7%	▼0.5%	▼0.7%
Council control before election
Conservative
Council control after election
Conservative

The 1988 Brentwood District Council election took place on 5 May 1988 to elect members of Brentwood District Council in Essex, England. This was on the same day as other local elections.

== Summary ==
=== Election result ===
1988 Brentwood District Council election
Party	This election			Full council			This election		
Party	Seats	Net	Seats %	Other	Total	Total %	Votes	Votes %	+/−
Conservative	9	▼1	69.2	12	21	53.8	12,198	51.1	+0.7
SLD	3	▲1	23.1	13	16	41.0	8,511	35.7	–0.5
Labour	1	Steady	7.7	1	2	5.1	2,799	11.7	–0.7
Green	0	Steady	0.0	0	0	0.0	350	1.5	+0.5
