= 1984 Brentwood District Council election =

1984 English local government election

- 3 May 1984

15 out of 39 seats to Brentwood District Council 20 seats needed for a majority

	First party	Second party	Third party
Party	Conservative	Alliance	Labour
Seats won	12	2	1
Seats after	25	12	2
Seat change	▼1	▲2	▼1
Popular vote	13,258	9,287	3,876
Percentage	50.2%	35.2%	14.7%
Swing	▼2.2%	▲3.4%	▼1.1%
Council control before election
Conservative
Council control after election
Conservative

The 1984 Brentwood District Council election took place on 3 May 1984 to elect members of Brentwood District Council in Essex, England. This was on the same day as other local elections.

== Summary ==
=== Election result ===
1984 Brentwood Borough Council election
Party	This election			Full council			This election		
Party	Seats	Net	Seats %	Other	Total	Total %	Votes	Votes %	+/−
Conservative	12	▼1	80.0	13	25	64.1	13,258	50.2	–2.2
Alliance	2	▲2	13.3	10	12	30.8	9,287	35.2	+3.4
Labour	1	▼1	6.7	1	2	5.1	3,876	14.7	–1.1
