= 2012 Brentwood Borough Council election =

2012 UK local government election

Results of the 2012 Brentwood Borough Council election

The 2012 Brentwood Borough Council election to the Brentwood Borough Council in Essex took place on Thursday 3 May 2012.

== Election result ==
Brentwood election result 2012
Party	Seats	Gains	Losses	Net gain/loss	Seats %	Votes %	Votes	+/−
Conservative	7	0	3	-3				
Liberal Democrats	4	2	0	+2				
Labour	1	1	0	+1				
Independent	1	0	0	0				
UKIP	0	0	0	0				
English Democrat	0	0	0	0				

== Ward results ==
Brentwood North
Party	Candidate	Votes	%	±%
Liberal Democrats	Ross Carter	810		
Conservative	Paul Faragher	439		
Labour	Richard Millwood	170		
UKIP	Kenneth Gulleford	104		
Majority		371		
Turnout				
Liberal Democrats hold		Swing		

Brentwood South
Party	Candidate	Votes	%	±%
Labour	Julie Morrissey	689		
Conservative	David Bishop	594		
Liberal Democrats	Stephen Tyrrell	149		
UKIP	Fred Southgate	146		
Majority		95		
Turnout			36%	
Labour gain from Conservative		Swing		

Brentwood West
Party	Candidate	Votes	%	±%
Liberal Democrats	Karen Chilvers	1003		
Conservative	Joan Holmes	667		
Labour	Gareth Barrett	148		
Majority		336		
Turnout			34.8%	
Liberal Democrats gain from Conservative		Swing		

Brizes and Doddinghurst
Party	Candidate	Votes	%	±%
Conservative	Roger McCheyne	806		
UKIP	Yvonne Maguire	318		
Liberal Democrats	Charlie Green	262		
Labour	Michele Wigram	131		
Majority		488		
Turnout				
Conservative hold		Swing		

Herongate, Ingrave and West Horndon
Party	Candidate	Votes	%	±%
Conservative	Sheila Murphy	696		
Labour	Peter Norris	140		
Liberal Democrats	Simon Beckett	84		
Majority		556		
Turnout			31.4%	
Conservative hold		Swing		

Hutton Central
Party	Candidate	Votes	%	±%
Conservative	John Kerslake	669		
Labour	Susan Kortlandt	145		
Liberal Democrats	Linda Price	104		
Majority		524		
Turnout			31.9%	
Conservative hold		Swing		

Hutton North
Party	Candidate	Votes	%	±%
Conservative	Louise McKinlay	600		
Labour	Peter Mayo	192		
Liberal Democrats	Peter Bowyer	112		
Majority		408		
Turnout			28.7	
Conservative hold		Swing		

Hutton South
Party	Candidate	Votes	%	±%
Conservative	Mark Reed	557		
UKIP	David Watt	178		
Labour	Deborah Foster	96		
Liberal Democrats	Christine Seymour	68		
Majority		379		
Turnout			29.2%	
Conservative hold		Swing		

Ingatestone, Fryerning and Mountnessing
Party	Candidate	Votes	%	±%
Conservative	Tony Sleep	870		
UKIP	Janette Gulleford	304		
Labour	Jane Winter	213		
Liberal Democrats	Colin Brown	141		
Majority		566		
Turnout			31.7%	
Conservative hold		Swing		

Pilgrims Hatch
Party	Candidate	Votes	%	±%
Liberal Democrats	David Kendall	920		
Conservative	Stephen Saunders	328		
Labour	Yvonne Waterhouse	255		
Majority		592		
Turnout			32.9%	
Liberal Democrats hold		Swing		

Shenfield
Party	Candidate	Votes	%	±%
Liberal Democrats	Graeme Clark	853		
Conservative	Margaret Brehaut	611		
Labour	Tim Barrett	116		
Majority		242		
Turnout			37.4%	
Liberal Democrats gain from Conservative		Swing		

Tipps Cross
Party	Candidate	Votes	%	±%
Independent	Roger Keeble	701		
Conservative	Sue Wheeller	493		
Labour	John Hopkins	44		
Liberal Democrats	June Spencer	19		
Majority		208		
Turnout			41.1%	
Independent hold		Swing		

Warley
Party	Candidate	Votes	%	±%
Conservative	David Tee	797		
Liberal Democrats	Trevor Ellis	344		
Labour	Stephen Mayo	219		
English Democrat	Kim Burrelli	97		
Majority		453		
Turnout				
Conservative hold		Swing		
