= 1986 Brentwood District Council election =

1986 English local government election

- 8 May 1986

13 out of 39 seats to Brentwood District Council 20 seats needed for a majority

	First party	Second party	Third party
Party	Conservative	Alliance	Labour
Seats won	6	6	1
Seats after	24	13	2
Seat change	▼3	▲3	Steady
Popular vote	10,768	9,635	4,192
Percentage	43.8%	39.2%	17.0%
Swing	▼6.4%	▲4.0%	▲2.3%
Council control before election
Conservative
Council control after election
Conservative

The 1986 Brentwood District Council election took place on 8 May 1986 to elect members of Brentwood District Council in Essex, England. This was on the same day as other local elections.

== Summary ==
=== Election result ===
1986 Brentwood District Council election
Party	This election			Full council			This election		
Party	Seats	Net	Seats %	Other	Total	Total %	Votes	Votes %	+/−
Conservative	6	▼3	46.2	18	24	61.5	10,768	43.8	–6.4
Alliance	6	▲3	46.2	7	13	33.3	9,635	39.2	+4.0
Labour	1	Steady	7.7	1	2	5.1	4,192	17.0	+2.3
