= 1980 Brentwood District Council election =

1980 English local government election

- 1 May 1980

13 out of 39 seats to Brentwood District Council 20 seats needed for a majority

	First party	Second party	Third party
Party	Conservative	Labour	Liberal
Seats won	10	2	1
Seats after	31	4	4
Seat change	▼2	▲1	▲1
Popular vote	10,000	5,205	4,767
Percentage	50.1%	26.1%	23.9%
Swing	▼11.7%	▼2.2%	▲14.0%
Council control before election
Conservative
Council control after election
Conservative

The 1980 Brentwood District Council election took place on 1 May 1980 to elect members of Brentwood District Council in Essex, England. This was on the same day as other local elections.

== Summary ==
=== Election result ===
1980 Brentwood District Council election
Party	This election			Full council			This election		
Party	Seats	Net	Seats %	Other	Total	Total %	Votes	Votes %	+/−
Conservative	10	▼2	76.9	21	31	79.5	10,000	50.1	–11.7
Labour	2	▲1	15.4	2	4	10.3	5,205	26.1	–2.2
Liberal	1	▲1	7.7	3	4	10.3	4,767	23.9	+14.0
