= Brentwood Town Hall =

Municipal building in Brentwood, Essex, England

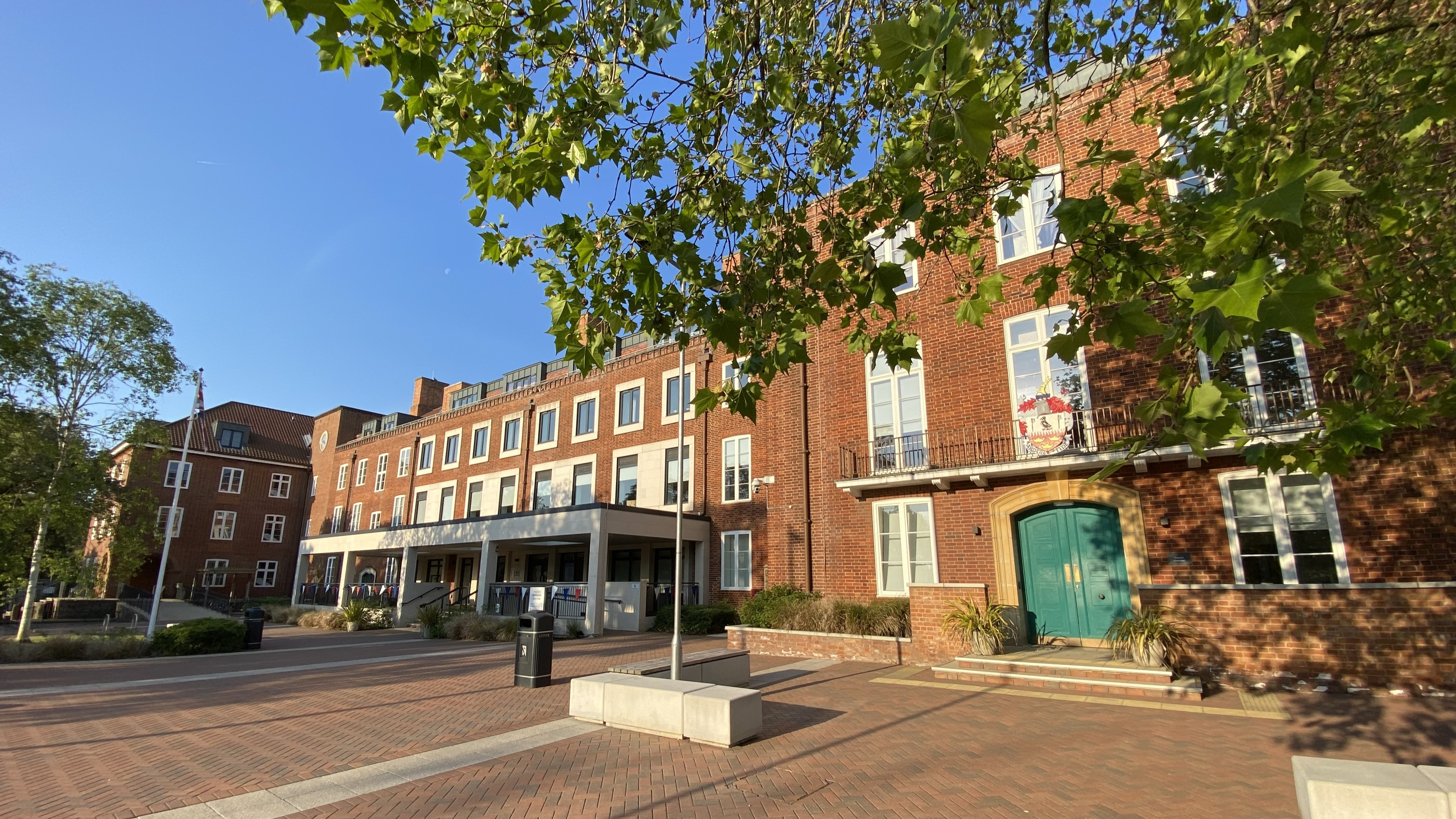
- Brentwood Town Hall

- Shown in Essex
- 51.6183°N 0.3078°E
- Location: Ingrave Road, Brentwood

History
- Built: 1957

Site notes
- Architect(s): John Brandon-Jones, Ashton & Broadbent
- Architectural style: Neo-Georgian style

Brentwood Town Hall is a municipal building in Ingrave Road, Brentwood, Essex, England which serves as the headquarters of Brentwood Borough Council.

== History ==
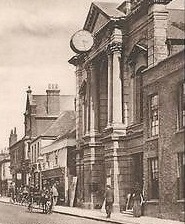
The old town hall in the High Street which was demolished in 1963

The first town hall in Brentwood was a neoclassical structure in the High Street, featuring a full-height portico with Corinthian order columns supporting an entablature with a project clock and a pediment; it was completed in 1864. Following population growth, as Brentwood emerged as a significant commuter town, the area became an urban district in 1899. As the responsibilities of the council grew, civic leaders established new council offices on some open land to the west of Ingrave Road in 1926.

In the early 1950s civic leaders decided to demolish to demolish the council offices in Ingrave Road and to procure a more substantial structure. The new building was designed by John Brandon-Jones, Ashton & Broadbent in the Neo-Georgian style, was built in red brick with stone dressings and was officially opened by Queen Elizabeth II, accompanied by Duke of Edinburgh, in October 1957.

The original design (the central and right hand sections of the current structure) involved an asymmetrical main frontage with sixteen bays facing onto Ingrave Road with the right hand section of three bays projected forward and containing a round headed entrance. The central section of thirteen bays featured three rows of Neo-Georgian style windows. The building was extended to the south in 1984 creating a left hand section of three bays which also projected forward and contained a clock tower as well as a round headed entrance, so giving the building its current symmetry. The appearance of the building was heavily influenced by the style of Charles Cowles-Voysey under whom Brandon-Jones had served in the 1930s. Pevsner described the building as "very old-fashioned" although he added that "Brentwood's councillors had spent their money wisely." Internally, the principal room in the building was the council chamber.

The building continued to serve as the local seat of government after the enlarged Brentwood District Council was formed in 1974. An extension to the rear was completed in 1990 and, following further population growth, Brentwood achieved municipal borough status with the building as its headquarters in April 1993.

In March 2017, a stainless steel sculpture designed by Michael Johnson and entitled the "Pilgrim's Staff" was unveiled outside the building to commemorate the town's historic role in hosting pilgrims travelling to Canterbury. Following an extensive programme of refurbishment works costing £15 million, which created a community hub as well as a mixture of residential and commercial space, the building was re-opened by the Duke of Kent in February 2020.
