= 1998 Brentwood Borough Council election =

1998 UK local government election

Elections to Brentwood Council were held on 7 May 1998. One third of the council was up for election and the Liberal Democrat party kept overall control of the council.

After the election, the composition of the council was

- Liberal Democrat 25
- Conservative 11
- Labour 2
- Liberal 1

== Election result ==
1998 Brentwood Borough Council election
Party	This election			Full council			This election		
Party	Seats	Net	Seats %	Other	Total	Total %	Votes	Votes %	+/−
Liberal Democrats	10	Steady	71.4	15	25	64.1	8,978	47.8	+5.0
Conservative	2	▼1	14.3	9	11	28.2	6,288	33.5	–4.0
Labour	1	Steady	7.1	1	2	5.1	3,006	16.0	–3.3
Liberal	1	▲1	7.1	0	1	2.6	413	2.2	New
Green	0	Steady	0.0	0	0	0.0	107	0.6	New

== Ward results ==
=== Brentwood North ===
Brentwood North
Party	Candidate	Votes	%	±%
Liberal Democrats	B. Aspinell	585	42.3	
Conservative	J. Shelton	375	27.1	
Labour	R. Goddard	317	22.9	
Green	F. Seckelman	107	7.7	
Majority			15.2	
Turnout			29.8	
Liberal Democrats hold		Swing		

=== Brentwood South ===
Brentwood South
Party	Candidate	Votes	%	±%
Labour	D. Minns	793	53.3	
Liberal Democrats	P. Goodey	349	23.5	
Conservative	S. Hamilton	346	23.3	
Majority			29.8	
Turnout			37.3	
Labour hold		Swing		

=== Brentwood West ===
Brentwood West
Party	Candidate	Votes	%	±%
Liberal Democrats	S. Howe	760	60.9	
Conservative	P. Currie	308	24.7	
Labour	S. Maidment	179	14.4	
Majority			36.2	
Turnout			32.4	
Liberal Democrats hold		Swing		

=== Brizes & Doddinghurst ===
Brizes & Doddinghurst
Party	Candidate	Votes	%	±%
Liberal Democrats	D. Hardy	1,216	71.5	
Conservative	J. Barnes	324	19.1	
Labour	S. Maxey	160	9.4	
Majority			52.4	
Turnout			32.6	
Liberal Democrats hold		Swing		

=== Hutton East ===
Hutton East
Party	Candidate	Votes	%	±%
Liberal Democrats	R. Davies	542	54.0	
Conservative	P. Sanders	282	28.1	
Labour	C. Bisson	179	17.8	
Majority			25.9	
Turnout			29.4	
Liberal Democrats hold		Swing		

=== Hutton North ===
Hutton North
Party	Candidate	Votes	%	±%
Liberal Democrats	P. Freeman	673	60.1	
Conservative	S. Barthee	318	28.4	
Labour	C. Maxey	129	11.5	
Majority			31.7	
Turnout			33.2	
Liberal Democrats hold		Swing		

=== Hutton South ===
Hutton South
Party	Candidate	Votes	%	±%
Conservative	B. Lewis	1,004	63.3	
Liberal Democrats	M. Wild	422	26.6	
Labour	M. Burgess	159	10.0	
Majority			36.7	
Turnout			30.5	
Conservative hold		Swing		

=== Ingatestone & Fryerning ===
Ingatestone & Fryerning
Party	Candidate	Votes	%	±%
Liberal Democrats	C. Dale	783	55.2	
Conservative	M. Kean	524	36.9	
Labour	J. Winter	112	7.9	
Majority			18.3	
Turnout			37.4	
Liberal Democrats hold		Swing		

=== Pilgrims Hatch ===
Pilgrims Hatch
Party	Candidate	Votes	%	±%
Liberal Democrats	A. Long	1,332	63.1	
Conservative	R. Mailard	474	22.5	
Labour	A. Freeman	305	14.4	
Majority			40.6	
Turnout			42.2	
Liberal Democrats hold		Swing		

=== Shenfield ===
Shenfield
Party	Candidate	Votes	%	±%
Conservative	M. Brehaut	797	54.2	
Liberal Democrats	S. Philbrooks	546	37.1	
Labour	M. Owen	128	8.7	
Majority			17.1	
Turnout			35.2	
Conservative hold		Swing		

=== South Weald ===
South Weald
Party	Candidate	Votes	%	±%
Liberal Democrats	J. Shawcross	456	67.6	
Conservative	A. Green	202	29.9	
Labour	M. Wigram	17	2.5	
Majority			37.7	
Turnout			61.3	
Liberal Democrats hold		Swing		

=== Warley ===
Warley
Party	Candidate	Votes	%	±%
Liberal Democrats	C. Robins	677	43.7	
Liberal Democrats	M. Taylor	637		
Conservative	R. Rankin	634	40.9	
Conservative	F. Kenny	620		
Labour	T. Acton	239	15.4	
Labour	R. Gow	203		
Turnout			34.7	
Liberal Democrats hold				
Liberal Democrats gain from Conservative				

=== West Horndon ===
West Horndon
Party	Candidate	Votes	%	±%
Liberal	M. Boggis	413	71.3	
Labour	M. Bourne	86	14.9	
Conservative	J. Hunt	80	13.8	
Majority			56.4	
Turnout			51.7	
Liberal gain from Liberal Democrats		Swing		
