= 1983 Brentwood District Council election =

1983 English local government election

- 5 May 1983

13 out of 39 seats to Brentwood District Council 20 seats needed for a majority

| | First party | Second party | Third party |
|---|---|---|---|
| Party | Conservative | Alliance | Labour |
| Seats won | 9 | 4 | 0 |
| Seats after | 28 | 9 | 2 |
| Seat change | ▼3 | ▲4 | ▼1 |
| Popular vote | 12,265 | 7,439 | 3,705 |
| Percentage | 52.4% | 31.8% | 15.8% |
| Swing | ▲1.8% | ▼4.8% | ▲3.0% |
Council control before election
Conservative
Council control after election
Conservative

The 1983 Brentwood District Council election took place on 5 May 1983 to elect members of Brentwood District Council in Essex, England. This was on the same day as other local elections.

== Summary ==
=== Election result ===
1983 Brentwood District Council election
| Party | This election | | | Full council | | | This election | | |
| Party | Seats | Net | Seats % | Other | Total | Total % | Votes | Votes % | +/− |
|---|---|---|---|---|---|---|---|---|---|
| Conservative | 9 | ▼3 | 69.2 | 19 | 28 | 71.8 | 12,265 | 52.4 | +1.8 |
| Alliance | 4 | ▲4 | 30.8 | 5 | 9 | 23.1 | 7,439 | 31.8 | –4.8 |
| Labour | 0 | ▼1 | 0.0 | 2 | 2 | 5.1 | 3,705 | 15.8 | +3.0 |
