= 1987 Brentwood District Council election =

1987 English local government election

- 7 May 1987

13 out of 39 seats to Brentwood District Council 20 seats needed for a majority

	First party	Second party	Third party
Party	Conservative	Alliance	Labour
Seats won	8	5	0
Seats after	23	14	2
Seat change	▼1	▲1	Steady
Popular vote	13,469	9,660	3,298
Percentage	50.4%	36.2%	12.4%
Swing	▲6.6%	▼3.0%	▼4.6%
Council control before election
Conservative
Council control after election
Conservative

The 1987 Brentwood District Council election took place on 7 May 1987 to elect members of Brentwood District Council in Essex, England. This was on the same day as other local elections.

== Summary ==
=== Election result ===
1987 Brentwood District Council election
Party	This election			Full council			This election		
Party	Seats	Net	Seats %	Other	Total	Total %	Votes	Votes %	+/−
Conservative	8	▼1	61.5	15	23	59.0	13,469	50.4	+6.6
Alliance	5	▲1	38.5	9	14	35.9	9,660	36.2	–3.0
Labour	0	Steady	0.0	2	2	5.1	3,298	12.4	–4.6
Green	0	Steady	0.0	0	0	0.0	276	1.0	N/A
