= 1976 Brentwood District Council election =

- 6 May 1973

All 39 seats to Brentwood District Council 20 seats needed for a majority

	First party	Second party
Party	Conservative	Labour
Seats won	34	4
Seat change	▲9	▼7
Popular vote	38,026	19,590
Percentage	60.8%	31.3%
Swing	▲1.3%	▼7.7%
	Third party	Fourth party
Party	Liberal	Independent
Seats won	1	0
Seat change	Steady	▼1
Popular vote	4,744	26
Percentage	7.6%	0.04%
Swing	▲7.1%	▼0.2%
Council control before election
Conservative
Council control after election
Conservative

The 1976 Brentwood District Council election took place on 6 May 1976 to elect members of Brentwood District Council in Essex, England. This was on the same day as other local elections.

== Summary ==
=== Election result ===
1976 Brentwood District Council election
Party	Candidates	Seats	Gains	Losses	Net gain/loss	Seats %	Votes %	Votes	+/−
Conservative	39	34			▲9	87.2	60.8	38,026	+1.3
Labour	39	4			▼7	10.3	31.3	19,590	–7.7
Liberal	13	1			Steady	2.6	7.6	4,744	+7.1
Communist	2	0			Steady	0.0	0.2	128	–0.6
Independent	1	0			▼1	0.0	0.04	26	–0.2
