= 2008 Brentwood Borough Council election =

2008 UK local government election

Results of the 2008 Brentwood Borough Council election

Elections to Brentwood Borough Council were held on 1 May 2008. One third of the council was up for election and the Conservative Party kept overall control of the council.

The Conservatives remained dominant on the council gaining seats from the Liberal Democrats and the Labour Party. However they also lost seats to the Liberal Democrats and to an independent candidate, who became the only independent councillor on the council.

After the election, the composition of the council was

- Conservative 28
- Liberal Democrat 6
- Labour 2
- Independent 1

== Election result ==
Brentwood local election result 2008
Party	Seats	Gains	Losses	Net gain/loss	Seats %	Votes %	Votes	+/−
Conservative	9	2	2	0	75.0	58.6	11,304	+4.6%
Liberal Democrats	2	1	1	0	16.7	27.6	5,318	-5.1%
Independent	1	1	0	+1	8.3	3.4	651	+0.6%
Labour	0	0	1	-1	0	8.2	1,586	-0.1%
UKIP	0	0	0	0	0	2.2	431	+0.0%

== Ward results ==
Brentwood North
Party	Candidate	Votes	%	±%
Liberal Democrats	Ross Carter	911	47.5	−1.1
Conservative	Mark Reed	865	45.1	+2.2
Labour	Gareth Barrett	142	7.4	−1.1
Majority		46	2.4	−3.3
Turnout		1,918	43.8	+3.7
Liberal Democrats gain from Conservative		Swing		

Brentwood South
Party	Candidate	Votes	%	±%
Conservative	Michael Golding	832	49.3	+8.6
Labour	Julie Morrissey	627	37.2	−4.2
Liberal Democrats	Gabriella Clarke	227	13.5	−4.4
Majority		205	12.1	
Turnout		1,686	42.2	+4.6
Conservative gain from Labour		Swing		

Brentwood West
Party	Candidate	Votes	%	±%
Conservative	Joan Holmes	933	52.5	+9.1
Liberal Democrats	Nigel Clarke	769	43.3	−8.7
Labour	Peter Mayo	75	4.2	−0.4
Majority		164	9.2	+0.6
Turnout		1,777	40.3	+1.6
Conservative hold		Swing		

Brizes & Doddinghurst
Party	Candidate	Votes	%	±%
Conservative	Roger McCheyne	1,057	59.6	+9.3
Liberal Democrats	Jackie Anslow	449	25.3	−8.3
UKIP	Yvonne Maguire	201	11.3	−0.5
Labour	Sheila Maxey	67	3.8	−0.5
Majority		608	34.3	+17.5
Turnout		1,774	39.0	+1.4
Conservative gain from Liberal Democrats		Swing		

Hutton Central
Party	Candidate	Votes	%	±%
Conservative	Jean McGinley	902	79.7	+1.2
Liberal Democrats	Christine Seymour	154	13.6	−2.1
Labour	Robert Gow	76	6.7	+0.9
Majority		748	66.1	+3.3
Turnout		1,132	40.3	−3.7
Conservative hold		Swing		

Hutton North
Party	Candidate	Votes	%	±%
Conservative	Louise Monnickendam	805	71.2	+23.6
Liberal Democrats	Shirley Howe	181	16.0	+16.0
Labour	Charles Bisson	145	12.8	+3.9
Majority		624	55.2	+51.1
Turnout		1,131	37.0	−0.9
Conservative hold		Swing		

Hutton South
Party	Candidate	Votes	%	±%
Conservative	Frank Kenny	894	78.4	−1.8
Liberal Democrats	Deborah Wood	170	14.9	+1.2
Labour	Richard Enever	76	6.7	+0.6
Majority		724	63.5	−3.1
Turnout		1,140	38.0	−6.0
Conservative hold		Swing		

Ingatestone, Fryerning & Mountnessing
Party	Candidate	Votes	%	±%
Conservative	Anthony Sleep	1,308	67.0	+14.2
Liberal Democrats	Bobbie Hall	279	14.3	−20.1
UKIP	Janette Gulleford	230	11.8	+2.8
Labour	Jane Winter	135	6.9	+3.1
Majority		1,029	52.7	+34.3
Turnout		1,952	42.4	−2.4
Conservative hold		Swing		

Pilgrims Hatch
Party	Candidate	Votes	%	±%
Liberal Democrats	David Kendall	1,057	58.8	+1.0
Conservative	Val Adams	675	37.5	−0.9
Labour	Michele Wigram	66	3.7	−0.1
Majority		382	21.3	+1.8
Turnout		1,798	40.1	+1.0
Liberal Democrats hold		Swing		

Shenfield
Party	Candidate	Votes	%	±%
Conservative	Margaret Brehaut	1,303	77.7	+0.0
Liberal Democrats	Trevor Ellis	269	16.1	−1.3
Labour	Kees Maxey	104	6.2	+1.3
Majority		1,034	61.6	+1.3
Turnout		1,676	40.7	+1.3
Conservative hold		Swing		

Tipps Cross
Party	Candidate	Votes	%	±%
Independent	Roger Keeble	651	46.3	+46.3
Conservative	Owen Rosindell	631	44.9	−26.3
Liberal Democrats	Michael Aspinell	93	6.6	−16.5
Labour	Paul Skingley	30	2.1	−3.6
Majority		20	1.4	
Turnout		1,405	47.8	+8.2
Independent gain from Conservative		Swing		

Warley
Party	Candidate	Votes	%	±%
Conservative	David Tee	1,099	57.8	+7.2
Liberal Democrats	Nina Cutbush	759	39.9	−4.3
Labour	Richard Margrave	43	2.3	−2.9
Majority		340	17.9	+11.5
Turnout		1,901	44.2	+3.2
Conservative hold		Swing		
