= 1992 Brentwood District Council election =

Election of the Brentwood Borough Council

The 1992 Brentwood Borough Council election took place on 7 May 1992 to elect members of Brentwood Borough Council in England.

== Results summary ==
1992 Brentwood Borough Council election
Party	This election				Full council			This election		
Party	Candidates	Seats	Net	Seats %	Other	Total	Total %	Votes	Votes %	+/−
Liberal Democrats	{{{candidates}}}	7	▲4	53.8	17	24	61.5	10,684	45.0	–2.4
Conservative	{{{candidates}}}	6	▼3	46.2	8	14	35.9	11,026	46.4	+5.9
Labour	{{{candidates}}}	0	▼1	0.0	1	1	2.6	1,955	8.2	–3.5
Green	{{{candidates}}}	0	Steady	0.0	0	0	0.0	81	0.3	±0.0

== Ward results ==
=== Blackmore ===
Blackmore
Party	Candidate	Votes	%	±%
Conservative	D. Hobbs	260	55.4	
Liberal Democrats	M. Crouch	179	38.2	
Labour	M. Coule	30	6.4	
Majority			17.2	
Turnout			53.7	
Conservative hold		Swing		

=== Brentwood North ===
Brentwood North
Party	Candidate	Votes	%	±%
Liberal Democrats	R. Straw	1,044	50.6	
Conservative	A. Hanwell	882	42.7	
Labour	R. Goddard	138	6.7	
Majority			7.9	
Turnout			47.4	
Liberal Democrats gain from Conservative		Swing		

=== Brentwood South ===
Brentwood South
Party	Candidate	Votes	%	±%
Liberal Democrats	E. Hine	807	38.3	
Conservative	J. Holiday	664	31.5	
Labour	J. Hopkins	637	30.2	
Majority			6.8	
Turnout			50.9	
Liberal Democrats gain from Labour		Swing		

=== Brentwood West ===
Brentwood West
Party	Candidate	Votes	%	±%
Liberal Democrats	D. Higgins	1,247	64.5	
Conservative	G. Smith	601	31.1	
Labour	H. Dawkes	84	4.3	
Majority			33.4	
Turnout			49.6	
Liberal Democrats hold		Swing		

=== Brizes & Doddinghurst ===
Brizes & Doddinghurst
Party	Candidate	Votes	%	±%
Liberal Democrats	D. Hardy	1,300	51.6	
Conservative	P. Adams	1,111	44.1	
Labour	A. Wilson	106	4.2	
Majority			7.5	
Turnout			50.6	
Liberal Democrats hold		Swing		

=== Hook End & Wyatts Green ===
Hook End & Wyatts Green
Party	Candidate	Votes	%	±%
Conservative	A. Gunnell	740	72.3	
Liberal Democrats	S. Saunders	232	22.7	
Labour	D. Green	52	5.1	
Majority			49.6	
Turnout			63.5	
Conservative hold		Swing		

=== Hutton East ===
Hutton East
Party	Candidate	Votes	%	±%
Liberal Democrats	K. Spanton	840	54.2	
Conservative	H. Fisher	571	36.8	
Labour	M. Oliver	139	9.0	
Majority			17.4	
Turnout			42.3	
Liberal Democrats gain from Conservative		Swing		

=== Hutton North ===
Hutton North
Party	Candidate	Votes	%	±%
Liberal Democrats	S. Barnes	819	47.0	
Conservative	N. Stevenson	806	46.2	
Labour	E. O'Brien	118	6.8	
Majority			0.8	
Turnout			53.4	
Liberal Democrats gain from Conservative		Swing		

=== Hutton South ===
Hutton South
Party	Candidate	Votes	%	±%
Conservative	E. Nicholson	1,395	66.1	
Liberal Democrats	G. Chapman	623	29.5	
Labour	M. Burgess	91	4.3	
Majority			36.6	
Turnout			41.3	
Conservative hold		Swing		

=== Ingatestone & Fryerning ===
Ingatestone & Fryerning
Party	Candidate	Votes	%	±%
Conservative	R. Harrison	941	48.1	
Liberal Democrats	C. Abbott	888	45.4	
Green	C. Bartley	81	4.1	
Labour	R. Margrave	46	2.4	
Majority			2.7	
Turnout			50.2	
Conservative hold		Swing		

=== Pilgrims Hatch ===
Pilgrims Hatch
Party	Candidate	Votes	%	±%
Liberal Democrats	H. Bailey	1,279	58.5	
Conservative	J. Gray	714	32.6	
Labour	L. Southgate	195	8.9	
Majority			25.9	
Turnout			43.1	
Liberal Democrats hold		Swing		

=== Shenfield ===
Shenfield
Party	Candidate	Votes	%	±%
Conservative	V. Fletcher	1,273	61.1	
Liberal Democrats	S. Roycroft	707	33.9	
Labour	G. Page	105	5.0	
Majority			27.2	
Turnout			49.9	
Conservative hold		Swing		

=== Warley ===
Warley
Party	Candidate	Votes	%	±%
Conservative	A. Bloomfield	1,068	53.4	
Liberal Democrats	M. Wild	719	35.9	
Labour	T. Acton	214	10.7	
Majority			17.5	
Turnout			43.3	
Conservative hold		Swing		
