= 1995 Brentwood Borough Council election =

1995 UK local government election

The 1995 Brentwood Borough Council election took place on 4 May 1995 to elect members of the Brentwood Borough Council in England.

== Results summary ==
1995 Brentwood Borough Council election
Party	This election			Full council			This election		
Party	Seats	Net	Seats %	Other	Total	Total %	Votes	Votes %	+/−
Liberal Democrats	9	Steady	69.2	17	26	66.7	9,986	48.5	–4.0
Conservative	4	Steady	30.8	8	12	30.8	6,210	30.1	–2.1
Labour	0	Steady	0.0	1	1	2.6	3,942	19.1	+5.9
Independent Liberal	0	Steady	0.0	0	0	0.0	203	1.0	New
Green	0	Steady	0.0	0	0	0.0	141	0.7	–0.9
Independent	0	Steady	0.0	0	0	0.0	120	0.6	+0.1

== Ward results ==
=== Brentwood North ===
Brentwood North
Party	Candidate	Votes	%	±%
Liberal Democrats	D. Eyre	910	53.5	
Conservative	A. Hanwell	412	24.2	
Labour	R. Goddard	323	19.0	
Green	F. Seckleman	56	3.3	
Majority			29.3	
Turnout			37.8	
Liberal Democrats hold		Swing		

=== Brentwood South ===
Brentwood South
Party	Candidate	Votes	%	±%
Liberal Democrats	M. Hogan	894	44.6	
Labour	C. Elphick	815	40.7	
Conservative	J. Holiday	257	12.8	
Green	J. Hedges	38	1.9	
Majority			3.9	
Turnout			49.1	
Liberal Democrats hold		Swing		

=== Brentwood West ===
Brentwood West
Party	Candidate	Votes	%	±%
Liberal Democrats	D. Kendall	1,041	68.3	
Conservative	T. Sibley	256	16.8	
Labour	I. Davidson	228	15.0	
Majority			51.5	
Turnout			39.9	
Liberal Democrats hold		Swing		

=== Brizes & Doddinghurst ===
Brizes & Doddinghurst
Party	Candidate	Votes	%	±%
Liberal Democrats	V. Cook	1,137	58.7	
Conservative	K. Galbraith	438	22.6	
Labour	A. Wilson	361	18.6	
Majority			36.1	
Turnout			37.5	
Liberal Democrats hold		Swing		

=== Herongate & Ingrave ===
Herongate & Ingrave
Party	Candidate	Votes	%	±%
Conservative	K. Wright	342	40.0	
Liberal Democrats	L. Thompson	293	34.3	
Independent Liberal	A. Marsh	139	16.3	
Labour	R. Gow	80	9.4	
Majority			5.7	
Turnout			35.2	
Conservative hold		Swing		

=== Hutton East ===
Hutton East
Party	Candidate	Votes	%	±%
Liberal Democrats	V. Russell	656	51.5	
Labour	P. Morgan	346	27.2	
Conservative	A. Thomas	272	21.4	
Majority			24.3	
Turnout			35.2	
Liberal Democrats hold		Swing		

=== Hutton North ===
Hutton North
Party	Candidate	Votes	%	±%
Liberal Democrats	P. Billinge	777	49.7	
Conservative	K. Barber	502	32.1	
Labour	B. Burns	219	14.0	
Independent Liberal	R. Farrow	64	4.1	
Majority			17.6	
Turnout			46.0	
Liberal Democrats hold		Swing		

=== Hutton South ===
Hutton South
Party	Candidate	Votes	%	±%
Conservative	A. Braid	1,137	60.3	
Liberal Democrats	G. Chapman	511	27.1	
Labour	M. Burgess	238	12.6	
Majority			33.2	
Turnout			36.7	
Conservative hold		Swing		

=== Ingatestone & Fryerning ===
Ingatestone & Fryerning
Party	Candidate	Votes	%	±%
Liberal Democrats	E. Bottomley	998	54.7	
Conservative	L. Boyce	535	29.3	
Labour	R. Fletcher	246	13.5	
Green	B. Lankester	47	2.6	
Majority			25.4	
Turnout			57.8	
Liberal Democrats hold		Swing		

=== Mountnessing ===
Mountnessing
Party	Candidate	Votes	%	±%
Liberal Democrats	D. Gottesmann	348	66.0	
Independent	M. Hepburn	120	22.8	
Conservative	V. Young	39	7.4	
Labour	P. Bartley	20	3.8	
Majority			43.2	
Turnout			57.8	
Liberal Democrats hold		Swing		

=== Pilgrims Hatch ===
Pilgrims Hatch
Party	Candidate	Votes	%	±%
Liberal Democrats	C. Myers	1,015	52.6	
Labour	M. Young	583	30.2	
Conservative	J. Gray	333	17.2	
Majority			22.4	
Turnout			38.6	
Liberal Democrats hold		Swing		

=== Shenfield ===
Shenfield
Party	Candidate	Votes	%	±%
Conservative	A. Galbraith	936	52.3	
Liberal Democrats	N. Spencer	680	38.0	
Labour	M. Owen	172	9.6	
Majority			14.3	
Turnout			42.2	
Conservative hold		Swing		

=== Warley ===
Warley
Party	Candidate	Votes	%	±%
Conservative	A. Earl	751	42.0	
Liberal Democrats	A. Everett	726	40.6	
Labour	M. Wigram	311	17.4	
Majority			1.4	
Turnout			38.8	
Conservative hold		Swing		
