= 1979 Brentwood District Council election =

1979 English local government election

- 3 May 1979

13 out of 39 seats Brentwood District Council 20 seats needed for a majority

	First party	Second party	Third party
Party	Conservative	Labour	Liberal
Seats won	12	1	0
Seats after	33	4	1
Seat change	▲1	▼1	Steady
Popular vote	21,456	9,814	3,435
Percentage	61.8%	28.3%	9.9%
Swing	▲1.5%	▼1.2%	▼0.1%
Council control before election
Conservative
Council control after election
Conservative

The 1979 Brentwood District Council election took place on 3 May 1979 to elect members of Brentwood District Council in Essex, England. This was on the same day as other local elections.

== Summary ==
=== Election result ===
1979 Brentwood District Council election
Party	This election			Full council			This election		
Party	Seats	Net	Seats %	Other	Total	Total %	Votes	Votes %	+/−
Conservative	12	▲1	92.3	21	33	84.6	21,456	61.8	+1.5
Labour	1	▼1	7.7	3	4	10.3	9,814	28.3	–1.2
Liberal	0	Steady	0.0	2	2	5.1	3,435	9.9	–0.1
