= 2015 Brentwood Borough Council election =

2015 UK local government election

- 7 May 2015

13 seats (out of 39) 20 seats needed for a majority
	First party	Second party	Third party
Party	Conservative	Liberal Democrats	Labour
Last election	23	11	3
Seats before	23	11	3
Seats won	25	10	2
Seat change	▲2	▼1	▼1
Popular vote	17,795	6,808	4,578
Percentage	49.9%	19.1%	12.8%
Swing	▲12.2%	▼5.5%	▲1.9%
	Fourth party	Fifth party	Sixth party
Party	Independent	Brentwood First	UKIP
Last election	1	1	0
Seats before	1	1	0
Seats won	1	1	0
Seat change	Steady	Steady	Steady
Popular vote	1,264	N/A	5,198
Percentage	3.5%	N/A	14.6%
Swing	▲2.6%	N/A	▼5.5%
- Results of the 2015 Brentwood Borough Council election

The 2015 Brentwood Borough Council election took place on 7 May 2015 to elect members of the Brentwood Borough Council in England. They were held on the same day as other local elections.

== Results summary ==
Brentwood Borough Council election, 2015
Party	Seats	Gains	Losses	Net gain/loss	Seats %	Votes %	Votes	+/−
Conservative	25	2	0	▲2		49.9	17,795	+12.2
Liberal Democrats	10	0	1	▼1		19.1	6,808	-5.5
Labour	2	0	1	▼1		12.8	4,578	+1.9
Independent	1	0	0	Steady		3.5	1,264	+2.6
Brentwood First	1	N/A	N/A	N/A		N/A	N/A	N/A
UKIP	0	0	0	Steady		14.6	5,198	-5.5
