= 2026 Brentwood Borough Council election =

2026 English local government election

- 7 May 2026

14 out of 39 seats to Brentwood Borough Council (including 1 by-election) 20 seats needed for a majority
- Registered: 60,476
- Turnout: 29,313; 48.5%
	First party	Second party	Third party
Leader	Barry Aspinell	Will Russell	Russell Quirk
Party	Liberal Democrats	Conservative	Reform
Last election	17 seats, 39.9%	19 seats, 39.4%	0 seats, 0.8%
Seats before	17	16	1
Seats won	4	3	7
Seats after	16	12	8
Seat change	▼1	▼4	▲7
Popular vote	7,613	7,912	11,605
Percentage	24.3%	25.2%	37.0%
Swing	▼15.6%	▼14.2%	▲36.2%
	Fourth party	Fifth party
Leader	Gareth Barrett	Sheila Murphy
Party	Labour	Independent
Last election	3 seats, 17.3%	Did not stand
Seats before	3	2
Seats won	0	0
Seats after	2	1
Seat change	▼1	▼1
Popular vote	1,774	228
Percentage	5.7%	0.7%
Swing	▼11.6%	N/A
- Winner of each seat at the 2026 Brentwood Borough Council election.
Leader before election
Barry Aspinell
Liberal Democrat
No overall control (Note: Liberal Democrat–Labour coalition.)
Leader after election
Barry Aspinell
Liberal Democrat
No overall control (Note: Liberal Democat-Labour-Independent coalition.)

The 2026 Brentwood Borough Council election was held on 7 May 2026, alongside the other local elections across the United Kingdom being held on the same day, to elect 13 of 39 members of Brentwood Borough Council.

Prior to the election, the council was under no overall control, being run by a Liberal Democrat and Labour coalition, led by Liberal Democrat councillor Barry Aspinell. Reform UK won half the seats being contested at this election, but the council remained under no overall control. Following the election, a broader coalition of the Liberal Democrats, Labour and independent councillors formed to run the council, again led by Barry Aspinell.

== Background ==
In 2024, the council remained under no overall control. The Liberal Democrats have run the council as a minority with Labour since 2023. In 2023, the Conservatives lost their majority.

=== Council composition ===
After 2024 election		Before 2026 election	
Party	Seats	Party	Seats
Liberal Democrats	17	Liberal Democrats	17
Conservative	19	Conservative	16
Labour	3	Labour	3
Reform	0	Reform	1
Independent	0	Independent	2

Changes 2024–2026:

- April 2025: Sheila Murphy (Conservative) and Fiona Marsh (Conservative) leave party to sit as independents
- July 2025: Mark Reed (Conservative) dies – by-election held October 2025
- October 2025: Russell Quirk (Reform) gains by-election from Conservatives

== Election result ==
2026 Brentwood Borough Council election
Party	This election				Full council			This election		
Party	Candidates	Seats	Net	Seats %	Other	Total	Total %	Votes	Votes %	+/−
Liberal Democrats	{{{candidates}}}	4	▼1	28.6	12	16	41.0	7,613	24.3	–15.6
Conservative	{{{candidates}}}	3	▼4	21.4	9	12	30.8	7,912	25.2	–14.2
Reform	{{{candidates}}}	7	▲7	50.0	1	8	20.5	11,605	37.0	+36.2
Labour	{{{candidates}}}	0	▼1	0.0	2	2	5.1	1,774	5.7	–11.6
Independent	{{{candidates}}}	0	▼1	0.0	1	1	2.6	228	0.7	N/A
Green	{{{candidates}}}	0	Steady	0.0	0	0	0.0	2,226	7.1	+4.4

== Ward results ==
=== Blackmore & Doddinghurst ===
Blackmore & Doddinghurst
Party	Candidate	Votes	%	±%
Reform	Peter Gregory	1,358	51.5	N/A
Conservative	Cliff Poppy*	860	32.6	–27.5
Liberal Democrats	Mary Spiers	208	7.9	–9.9
Green	Nicholas Kelly	117	4.4	–6.6
Labour	Liam Czop	95	3.6	–7.4
Majority		498	18.9	N/A
Turnout		2,644	55.4	+12.1
Registered electors		4,773		
Reform gain from Conservative				

=== Brentwood North ===
Brentwood North
Party	Candidate	Votes	%	±%
Liberal Democrats	Steve Mayo*	1,017	44.9	–7.8
Reform	John Roberts	681	30.1	N/A
Conservative	John Parrish	256	11.3	–8.3
Green	John Hamilton	198	8.7	–2.2
Labour	Joanna Moncrieff	109	4.8	–11.9
Majority		336	14.8	N/A
Turnout		2,261	44.7	+14.3
Registered electors		5,054		
Liberal Democrats hold				

=== Brentwood South ===
Brentwood South
Party	Candidate	Votes	%	±%
Reform	Sophie Aaron	592	27.2	N/A
Liberal Democrats	Arthur Leathley	570	26.2	–8.3
Labour	Elizabeth Jerrard*	503	23.1	–23.3
Conservative	Paola Sanders	318	14.6	–4.3
Green	Samuel Andreetti	192	8.8	N/A
Majority		22	1.0	N/A
Turnout		2,183	47.5	+10.7
Registered electors		4,598		
Reform gain from Labour				

=== Brentwood West ===
Brentwood West (2 seats due to by-election)
Party	Candidate	Votes	%	±%
Liberal Democrats	Nigel Clarke	914	45.2	–7.4
Liberal Democrats	Brenner Munden	714	35.3	–16.5
Reform	Matt Corr	680	33.6	N/A
Reform	Scott Poole	558	27.6	N/A
Conservative	Terence Brant	424	21.0	–10.4
Conservative	Adrianus Coolbergen	290	14.3	–16.6
Green	Natalie Dench	224	11.1	+1.5
Green	Marc Sardinha	192	9.5	N/A
Labour	Michael McQuaid	141	7.0	–11.6
Labour	Sean O'Sullivan	97	4.8	–10.8
Turnout		4,244	81.6	+52.7
Registered electors		5,198		
Liberal Democrats hold				
Liberal Democrats hold				

=== Brizes, Stondon Massey & South Weald ===
Brizes, Stondon Massey & South Weald
Party	Candidate	Votes	%	±%
Reform	Craig Thomson	1,240	53.2	N/A
Conservative	Soni Sunger*	604	25.9	–19.2
Liberal Democrats	John Chapple	246	10.6	–24.4
Green	Rebecca Enifer	134	5.8	–3.0
Labour	Simon Ball	103	4.4	–6.7
Majority		636	27.3	N/A
Turnout		2,333	49.7	+15.5
Registered electors		4,692		
Reform gain from Conservative				

=== Herongate, Ingrave & West Horndon ===
Herongate, Ingrave & West Horndon
Party	Candidate	Votes	%	±%
Reform	Omar Bakhsh	828	46.0	N/A
Conservative	Sim Owolabi	465	25.8	–39.2
Independent	Fiona Marsh*	228	12.7	N/A
Liberal Democrats	Gary Maxius	122	6.8	–16.0
Green	Charlotte Bradford	98	5.4	N/A
Labour	Kevin Brailey	58	3.2	–9.0
Majority		363	20.2	N/A
Turnout		1,806	51.2	+22.8
Registered electors		3,525		
Reform gain from Independent				

=== Hutton East ===
Hutton East
Party	Candidate	Votes	%	±%
Reform	Paul Godfrey	800	36.0	+22.1
Conservative	Thomas Bridge	706	31.8	–7.8
Liberal Democrats	Nina Allan	470	21.2	–16.2
Green	Jamie Miller	144	6.5	N/A
Labour Co-op	Richard Millwood	100	4.5	–4.6
Majority		94	4.2	N/A
Turnout		2,224	48.4	+14.4
Registered electors		4,595		
Reform gain from Conservative		Swing	▲15.0	

=== Hutton North ===
Hutton North
Party	Candidate	Votes	%	±%
Conservative	Jay Patel*	903	41.0	–7.8
Reform	Chris Hossack	769	34.9	N/A
Green	Adam Hoxha	197	8.9	–1.4
Liberal Democrats	Nita Jhummu	189	8.6	–7.2
Labour	Phil Holland	146	6.6	–18.6
Majority		134	6.1	N/A
Turnout		2,209	48.0	+14.2
Registered electors		4,606		
Conservative hold				

=== Hutton South ===
Hutton South
Party	Candidate	Votes	%	±%
Reform	Philippa Nicholson	987	40.7	N/A
Conservative	Mellissa Slade*	785	32.3	–13.1
Liberal Democrats	Heather Leathley	302	12.4	–3.4
Green	David Hale	186	7.7	–3.3
Labour	Jane Winter	165	6.8	–21.0
Majority		202	8.4	N/A
Turnout		2,425	46.3	+16.6
Registered electors		5,233		
Reform gain from Conservative				

=== Ingatestone, Fryerning & Mountnessing ===
Ingatestone, Fryerning & Mountnessing
Party	Candidate	Votes	%	±%
Conservative	Lesley Wagland*	930	35.9	–5.7
Reform	Martin Lonergan	814	31.4	N/A
Liberal Democrats	Louise Donno	645	24.9	–26.5
Green	Paul Jeater	161	6.2	N/A
Labour	Caroline Russell	41	1.6	–5.4
Majority		116	4.5	N/A
Turnout		2,597	51.5	+14.6
Registered electors		5,044		
Conservative hold				

=== Pilgrims Hatch ===
Pilgrims Hatch
Party	Candidate	Votes	%	±%
Reform	Samuel Gascoyne	993	45.5	N/A
Liberal Democrats	Mark Lewis*	821	37.6	–30.1
Conservative	Gordon Cowley	192	8.8	–6.1
Green	Dom Graham	108	4.9	–1.6
Labour	Ankie Saunders	68	3.1	–7.7
Majority		172	7.9	N/A
Turnout		2,186	46.6	+15.4
Registered electors		4,689		
Reform gain from Liberal Democrats				

=== Shenfield ===
Shenfield
Party	Candidate	Votes	%	±%
Conservative	Thomas Gordon*	905	36.5	+2.7
Reform	Paul Joyner	693	27.9	+16.8
Liberal Democrats	John Singh	686	27.7	–13.1
Green	Thea Antoniou	132	5.3	–1.9
Labour	Paul Barrett	63	2.5	–4.4
Majority		212	8.6	N/A
Turnout		2,488	56.8	+15.0
Registered electors		4,381		
Conservative hold		Swing	▼7.1	

=== Warley ===
Warley
Party	Candidate	Votes	%	±%
Liberal Democrats	Jay Laplain*	709	38.9	–14.3
Reform	Oliver Andrews	612	33.6	N/A
Conservative	Louise Rowlands	274	15.0	–5.5
Green	Jo Brown	143	7.8	–4.0
Labour Co-op	Susan Kortlandt	85	4.7	–9.7
Majority		97	5.3	N/A
Turnout		1,828	44.7	+15.8
Registered electors		4,088		
Liberal Democrats hold				
