= 2018 Brentwood Borough Council election =

2018 UK local government election

Map showing the results of the 2018 Brentwood Borough Council election

The 2018 Brentwood Borough Council election took place on 3 May 2018 to elect members of Brentwood Borough Council in England. This was on the same day as other local elections.

== Result summary ==
Brentwood Borough Council election, 2018
Party	Seats	Gains	Losses	Net gain/loss	Seats %	Votes %	Votes	+/−
Conservative	25	2	0	▲2		45.6	8,111	▼0.9
Liberal Democrats	9	0	1	▼1		34.5	6,149	▲7.3
Labour	2	0	0	Steady		14.0	2,491	▲2.1
Independent	1	0	1	▼1		4.9	864	▼1.6
Green	0	0	0	Steady		1.1	190	▼0.5

== Ward results ==
=== Brentwood North ===
Brentwood North ward, 3 May 2018
Party	Candidate	Votes	%	±%
Liberal Democrats	Phillip Mynott	849	51.9	▼7.0
Conservative	John Everett	463	28.3	▲3.3
Labour	Toby Blunsten	233	14.2	▲4.0
Green	John Hamilton	92	5.6	▼0.3
Majority		386	23.6	▼18.8
Turnout		1644	30.8	▼0.5
Liberal Democrats hold		Swing	▼5.2	

=== Brentwood South ===
Brentwood South ward, 3 May 2018
Party	Candidate	Votes	%	±%
Labour	Gareth Barrett	624	42.2	▲8.3
Conservative	Garry White	600	40.6	▲6.7
Liberal Democrats	Brenner Munden	254	17.2	▲0.1
Majority		24	1.6	▲1.0
Turnout		1483	32.6	▲0.1
Labour hold		Swing	▲0.8	

=== Brentwood West ===
Brentwood West ward, 3 May 2018
Party	Candidate	Votes	%	±%
Liberal Democrats	Dominic Naylor	863	51.5	▼1.7
Conservative	Sandy Tanner	570	34.0	▼1.8
Labour	Deborah Foster	244	14.5	▲5.0
Majority		293	17.5	3.5
Turnout		1690	30.8	▲0.3
Liberal Democrats hold		Swing	▲0.05	

=== Brizes & Doddinghurst ===
Brizes & Doddinghurst ward, 3 May 2018
Party	Candidate	Votes	%	±%
Conservative	Keith Parker	957	62.6	▼1.5
Liberal Democrats	Hugh Gorton	417	27.3	▲16.2
Labour	David Jobbins	154	10.1	▼0.9
Majority		540	35.3	▼17.2
Turnout		1535	32.2	▲0.9
Conservative hold		Swing	▼8.85	

=== Herongate, Ingrave & West Horndon ===
Herongate, Ingrave & West Horndon ward, 3 May 2018
Party	Candidate	Votes	%	±%
Conservative	Cat Tierney	643	56.5	Steady
Independent	Amanda Burton	387	34.0	▲34.0
Labour	Pauline Watts	74	6.5	▼2.4
Liberal Democrats	David Green	34	3.0	▲3.0
Majority		256	22.5	
Turnout		1143	37.7	
Conservative gain from Independent		Swing		

=== Hutton Central ===
Hutton Central
Party	Candidate	Votes	%	±%
Conservative	Charles Nolan	695	71.0	▲0.9
Labour	Marian Jenkins	150	15.3	▲2.2
Liberal Democrats	Anne Long	134	13.7	▼3.2
Majority		545	55.7	53.2
Turnout		988	32.5	▲2.9
Conservative hold		Swing	▼0.7	

=== Hutton East ===
Hutton East ward, 3 May 2018
Party	Candidate	Votes	%	±%
Conservative	Olivia Sanders	447	57.2	▼0.6
Labour	Jane Winter	144	18.4	▼3.9
Liberal Democrats	Gary McDonnell	115	14.7	▲5.6
Independent	Jan Gearon-Simm	75	9.6	▲9.6
Majority		303	38.8	▼9.0
Turnout		782	26.1	▼7.1
Conservative hold		Swing	▲1.65	

=== Hutton South ===
Hutton South ward, 3 May 2018
Party	Candidate	Votes	%	±%
Conservative	Roger Hirst	772	76.0	▲5.9
Labour	Francisca Dapp	141	13.9	▲0.8
Liberal Democrats	Matthew Emerson	103	10.1	▼6.8
Majority		631	62.1	▲14.1
Turnout		1025	34	▼0.3
Conservative hold		Swing	▲2.6	

=== Ingatestone, Fryerning and Mountnessing ===
Ingatestone, Fryerning and Mountnessing ward, 3 May 2018
Party	Candidate	Votes	%	±%
Conservative	Jon Cloke	832	47.8	▼10.0
Liberal Democrats	Darryl Sankey	630	36.2	▲28.2
Labour	Emma Benson	182	10.4	▼4.4
Green	Paul Jeater	98	5.6	▲5.6
Majority		202	11.6	▼26.6
Turnout		1749	35.3	▼0.2
Conservative hold		Swing	▼19.1	

=== Pilgrims Hatch ===
Pilgrims Hatch ward, 3 May 2018
Party	Candidate	Votes	%	±%
Liberal Democrats	Barry Aspinell	1,157	73.2	▲15.3
Conservative	Tom Heard	289	18.3	▲1.2
Labour	Liam Preston	134	8.5	▲1.4
Majority		868	54.9	▲14.9
Turnout		1749	34.3	▼1.3
Liberal Democrats hold		Swing		

=== Shenfield ===
Shenfield ward, 3 May 2018
Party	Candidate	Votes	%	±%
Conservative	Jan Pound	1,007	55.1	▼4.4
Liberal Democrats	John Newberry	703	38.4	▲13.2
Labour	Richard Millwood	119	6.5	▼0.9
Majority		304	16.7	▼17.6
Turnout		1,839	43.2	▲3.2
Conservative hold		Swing	▼8.8	

=== South Weald ===
South Weald ward, 3 May 2018
Party	Candidate	Votes	%	±%
Conservative	Tom McLaren	341	50.1	▲5.8
Liberal Democrats	Mark Lewis	274	40.3	N/A
Labour	Tim Barrett	63	9.3	▲4.0
Majority		67	9.8	
Turnout				
Conservative hold		Swing		

=== Warley ===
Warley ward, 3 May 2018
Party	Candidate	Votes	%	±%
Liberal Democrats	Mark Haigh	616	35.4	▼8.7
Conservative	Richard Broomfield	495	28.4	▼11.6
Independent	Jill Hubbard	402	23.1	New
Labour	Susan Kortlandt	229	13.1	▲3.0
Majority		121	7.0	
Turnout				
Liberal Democrats hold		Swing		
