= Fryerning =

Village in Essex, England

Coordinates: 51.6748°N 0.3705°E

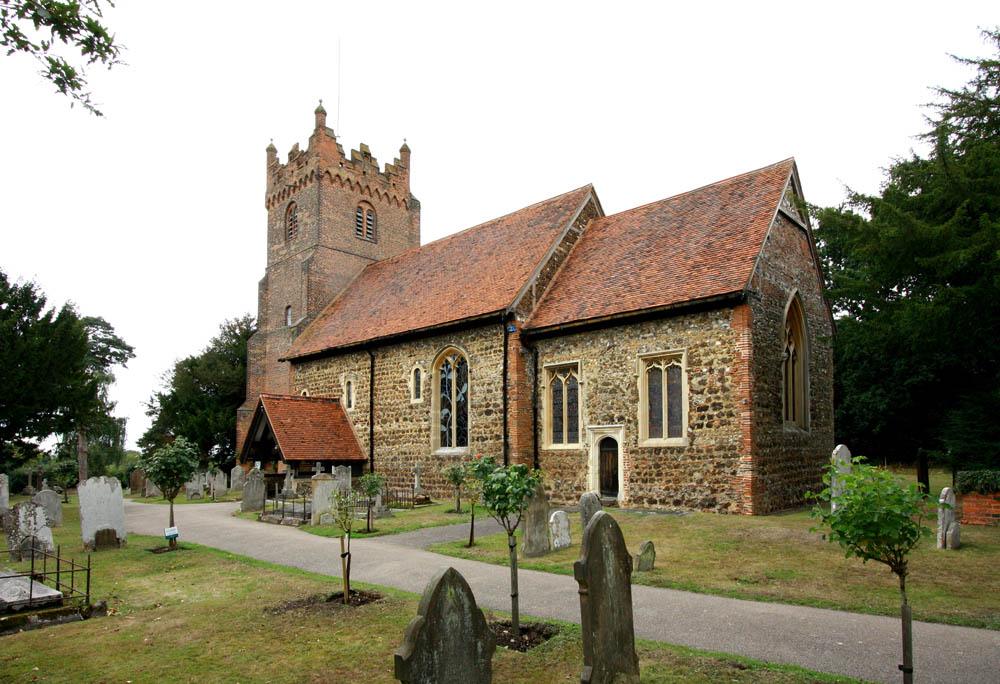
- St Mary's church, Fryerning

- Location within Essex
- OS grid reference: TL640003
- Civil parish: Ingatestone and Fryerning
- District: Brentwood
- Shire county: Essex
- Region: East
- Country: England
- Sovereign state: United Kingdom
- Post town: Ingatestone
- Postcode district: CM4
- Dialling code: 01277
- Police: Essex
- Fire: Essex
- Ambulance: East of England
- UK Parliament: Brentwood and Ongar

Fryerning is a village in the civil parish of Ingatestone and Fryerning, in the Borough of Brentwood in Essex, England. It is situated approximately 2 miles (3.2 km) north of Ingatestone. The parish church of St. Mary the Virgin, on Blackmore Road, dates back from the 11th century, with a 15th-century brick tower. It has a memorial stained glass window to the murdered politician Airey Neave, which was unveiled by his cousin Penelope in 1985. An ancient English Yew, found to the west of the church and is over a millennium old, is thought to be one of Essex's oldest trees.

Fryerning was formerly a civil parish; it was merged with Ingatestone in 1889. Fryerning is located in mid-Essex and has several big areas of woodland populated by several large herds of deer, which are frequently seen by walkers and cyclists. The village has no shops, but two pubs.

== History ==
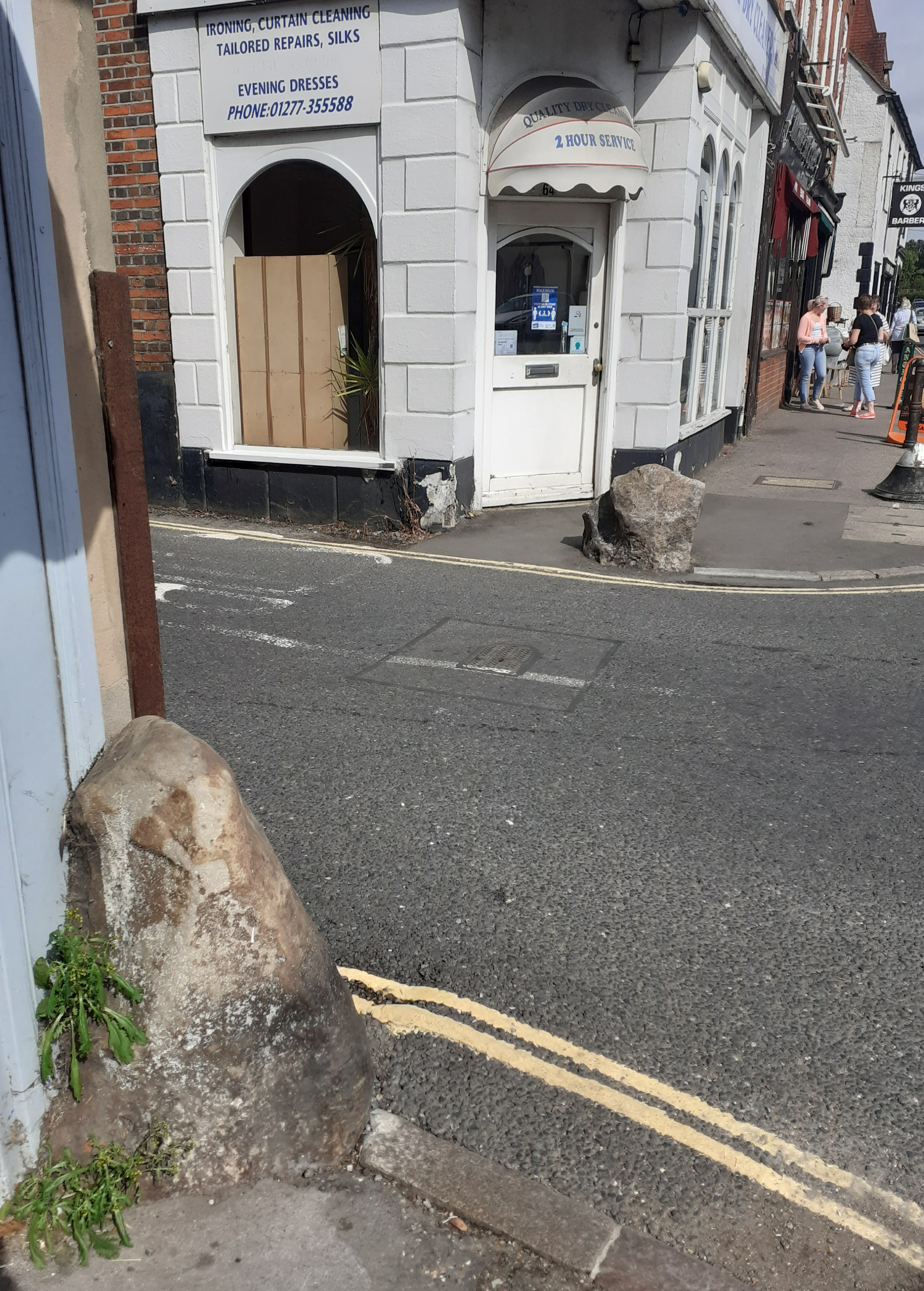

Fryerning and nearby Ingatestone have always been closely entwined. The earliest surviving signs of their ancient past can be seen on the Fryerning Lane, which connects with Ingatestone High Street, where two large Sarsen Stones mark either side of the lane.

=== Saxon Period ===
The name Fryerning derives from the Saxon period. The syllable "ing" denoting possession, probably during the sixth century, thus Saxon territories each distinguished by the owners name; these were usually prefixed by "ing" or "ging", a principle shared with neighbouring villages: Margaretting, Mountnessing and Ingrave. It is thought that the various "ing" places formed part of a single territory in Saxon times which subsequently fragmented into smaller parishes and manors.

=== Norman Period ===
After the Norman conquest, the "ings" or "gings" were divided up. Fryerning and Ingatestone were collectively known as Ging-at-the Stone and was given to the Norman Baron Robert de Germon. Later on, his grandson Gilbert Mountfitchet granted half the manor called Ginges, along with the church St Mary's, to the Knights Hospitaller and that part was known as Ging Hospital. It subsequently became known as the Ing of the friars (fryern), referring to its ownership by the Knights Hospitallers, giving rise to the modern name Fryerning.

The Knights Hospitallers constructed a barn at North Hall Farm, which survives to this day; the 13th-century barn is comparable to the better-preserved barn of Cressing Temple in Witham.

=== Tudor Period ===
In 1540, the Knights Hospitallers were suppressed by Henry VIII when the Ging Hospital was transferred to Sir William Berners, the Royal auditor; the area then became known as Ging Berners. Later, in the 16th century, part of the area came into the possession of the De Vere family, Earls of Oxford.

Three generations later, William Berners great-grandson sold Fryerning to Sir Nicolas Wadham, whose daughter, Dorothy Wadhams, married Sir William Petre. William and Dorothy later went on to found Wadham College in Oxford, which still owns land in Fryerning and is the Patron of the parish.

=== Modern Period ===
In 1936, a Spanish oak tree was planted on in the centre of the ancient Church Green to commemorate the Coronation of King Edward VIII. At the time, there was a debate in the village due to the fact that the Oak was not a native English specimen. Local resident, Charlie Cox who was eight at the time, remembers that the green was about 50 yards long on each side forming a triangle.

In 1948, the Ingatestone and Fryerning Dart League was set up between Pubs Anchor A, Anchor B, British Legion, Crown Hotel, Spread Eagle, Woolpack Hotel Fryerning and Viper Hotel Mill Green.

In 2011, Brentwood Borough Council asked Essex County Council to commission a conservation area in Fryerning, which was subsequently enforced. Many historical buildings, ranging from the 12th century to the late 20th century, were included in the conservation area, along with 3 trees having a preservation order placed upon them: the Coronation Oak and the West and East Ancient Yew Trees at St Mary's Church.

On the 11th of September 2021, Lord Petre visited local residents and dignitaries of Fryerning, at the Church Green, to officially open the recently renovated Fryerning Parish Room; it was built in 1904, extended in 1924 and renovated in 2021.

=== Administrative history ===
Fryerning was an ancient parish in the Chelmsford Hundred of Essex. The parish had complicated boundaries with the neighbouring parish of Ingatestone. A large part of the built up area of Ingatestone was actually in Fryerning parish, and through the centre of Ingatestone village the boundary followed the main street. Ingatestone parish also had a large detached rural exclave to the north of Fryerning parish. The complicated boundaries likely arose from them having anciently been created from the subdivision of an earlier territory.

In 1889 the two parishes were merged into a new civil parish called Ingatestone and Fryerning. At the 1881 census (the last before the abolition of the civil parish), Fryerning had a population of 704.

When elected parish and district councils were established in 1894, Ingatestone and Fryerning was given a parish council and included in the Chelmsford Rural District. The parish was transferred to Brentwood district in 1974.
