= Pilgrims Hatch =

Suburb of Brentwood, Essex, England

Coordinates: 51.636°N 0.291°E

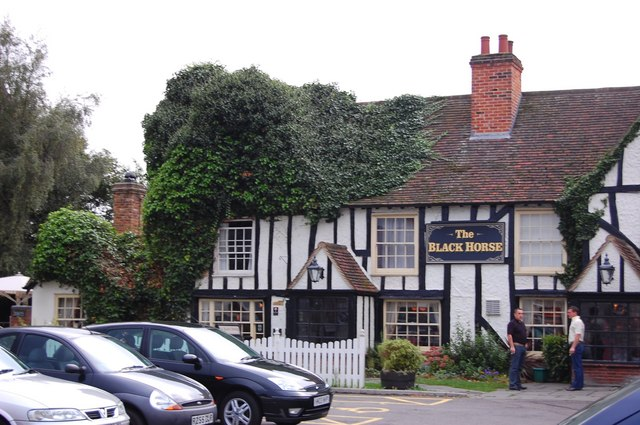
- A pub in Pilgrims Hatch, 2008

- Location within Essex
- Population: 5,963 (Ward 2011)
- OS grid reference: TQ585955
- District: Borough of Brentwood
- Shire county: Essex
- Region: East
- Country: England
- Sovereign state: United Kingdom
- Post town: Brentwood
- Postcode district: CM15
- Dialling code: 01277
- Police: Essex
- Fire: Essex
- Ambulance: East of England
- UK Parliament: Brentwood and Ongar

Pilgrims Hatch is a residential suburb of Brentwood, Essex, in the east of England. There is a borough council ward bearing the name 'Pilgrims Hatch' which covers the Bishops Hall and Flower estates (the urban area north of the A12 road) and a small rural area to the north up to Ashwells Road and Days Lane. Pilgrims Hatch usually elects Liberal Democrat councillors. It has a population of around 6,000 people.

== History ==
'Pilgrims Hatch' literally means Pilgrim's Gate (with 'hatch' being derived from the Old English form of haecc) and, until recently, local schools used a large farmer's gate as a symbol of the area. While no longer common it is still the semi-official symbol of the village. One of the local schools that still has the "gate" incorporated within their school badge is Larchwood Primary School.

The name derived from 12th century Thomas Becket pilgrimages to Canterbury through Brentwood, a popular stopping place at the time, before travelling onto Tilbury for the ferry. Pilgrims from the Midlands would pass through Pilgrims Hatch en route to Brentwood. At this time Pilgrims Hatch was not recognised as a community as such, having only a few properties in an area which was mainly open countryside and not settled in any numbers until the 20th century. The Chapman & André map of 1777 references 'Pilgrims Hatch Common' and shows limited development along what was to become the modern Ongar Road near the junction with Coxtie Green Road (Cox Green then). The main development of Pilgrims Hatch as a village occurred after the Second World War.

Although population development may have been quite late, Pilgrims Hatch was home to a critical part of early communications infrastructure with Cable & Wireless having a substantial telegraph radio receiving station built on the junction of Hatch Road and Doddinghurst Road in 1921. (with the associated transmitting station in nearby North Weald) During World War II this site was considered sufficiently important in the war effort that substantial air defences were also constructed around it. Although some buildings from the site remained early into the 21st century it has now been transformed into housing developments and an extension to Bishops Hall Park.

== Amenities ==
The Brentwood Centre is situated on the edge of Pilgrims Hatch, and is the centre of sport, leisure, and musical events within the borough. There is an annual festival held at the centre, as well as a traditional fireworks display on or close to Guy Fawkes Night each year.

The area relies mainly on Brentwood's high street stores and supermarkets, but does have a number of local shops and businesses. It also is served by local restaurants, takeaways and pubs.
