= Borough of Brentwood =

District in Essex, England

Coordinates: 51.6°N 0.3°E

- Non-metropolitan district, Borough
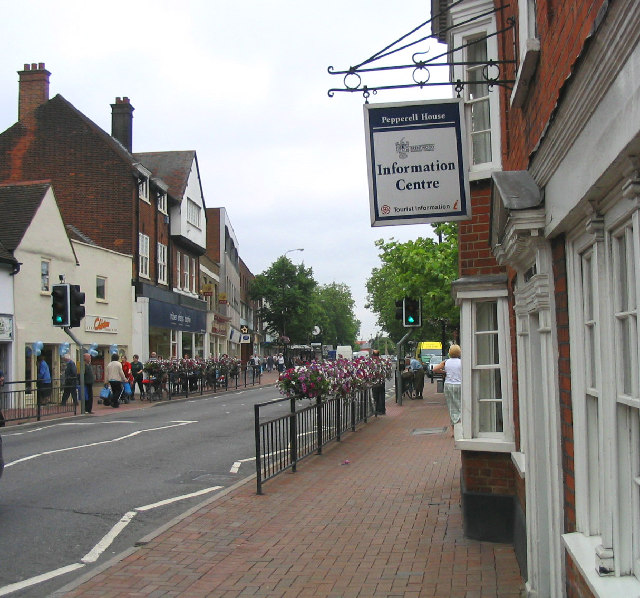
- High Street in Brentwood, the largest town in the borough

- Brentwood shown within Essex
- Interactive map of Borough of Brentwood
- Sovereign state: United Kingdom
- Constituent country: England
- Region: East of England
- Non-metropolitan county: Essex
- Status: Non-metropolitan district, Borough
- Admin HQ: Brentwood
- Incorporated: 1 April 1974

Government
  - Type: Non-metropolitan district council
  - Body: Brentwood Borough Council
  - Leadership: Alternative - Sec. 31 (No overall control)
  - MPs: Alex Burghart

Area
  - Total: 59.12 sq mi (153.12 km^{2})
  - Rank: 165th (of 296)

Population (2024)
  - Total: 79,326
  - Rank: 282nd (of 296)
  - Density: 1,341.8/sq mi (518.06/km^{2})

Ethnicity (2021)
  - Ethnic groups: List: 88.5% White; 5.1% Asian (Mainly from Mauritius); 3.1% Mixed; 2.3% Black; 1.1% other

Religion (2021)
  - Religion: List: 56% Christianity; 33.3% no religion; 5.6% not stated; 1.8% Hinduism; 1.6% Islam; 0.5% Sikhism; 0.4% Judaism; 0.4% % Buddhism; 0.3% other
- Time zone: UTC0 (GMT)
  - Summer (DST): UTC+1 (BST)
- GSS code: E07000068
- OS grid reference: TQ595938

The Borough of Brentwood is a local government district with borough status in Essex, England. The borough is named after its main town of Brentwood, where the council is based; it includes several villages and the surrounding rural area.

The neighbouring districts are Epping Forest, Chelmsford, Basildon, Thurrock and the London Borough of Havering.

== History ==
The former Brentwood Urban District had been created in 1899. Urban districts were abolished in 1974 under the Local Government Act 1972. A new non-metropolitan district was created on 1 April 1974 covering the whole of the former Brentwood Urban District plus parts of another two districts, which were all abolished at the same time:

- Brentwood Urban District
- Chelmsford Rural District (two parishes only, rest went to Chelmsford)
  - Ingatestone and Fryerning
  - Mountnessing
- Epping and Ongar Rural District (five parishes only, rest went to Epping Forest)
  - Blackmore
  - Doddinghurst
  - Kelvedon Hatch
  - Navestock
  - Stondon Massey

The new district was named Brentwood after its main town. The district was awarded borough status on 10 March 1993, allowing the chair of the council to take the title of mayor.

In March 2026, the government announced that it would abolish the district in 2028 as part of local government reform across Essex. These proposals were withdrawn in September 2026.

== Governance ==
Brentwood Borough Council

Type
- Type: Non-metropolitan district

Leadership
- Mayor: Nicky Cuthbert, Liberal Democrat since 20 May 2026
- Leader: Barry Aspinall, Liberal Democrat since 17 May 2023
- Chief Executive: Jonathan Stephenson since 2019

Structure
- Seats: 39
- Political groups: Administration (20) Liberal Democrats (16) Labour (2) Independent (2) Other parties (19) Conservatives (11) Reform UK (8)

Elections
- Last election: 7 May 2026
- Next election: 2027

Meeting place
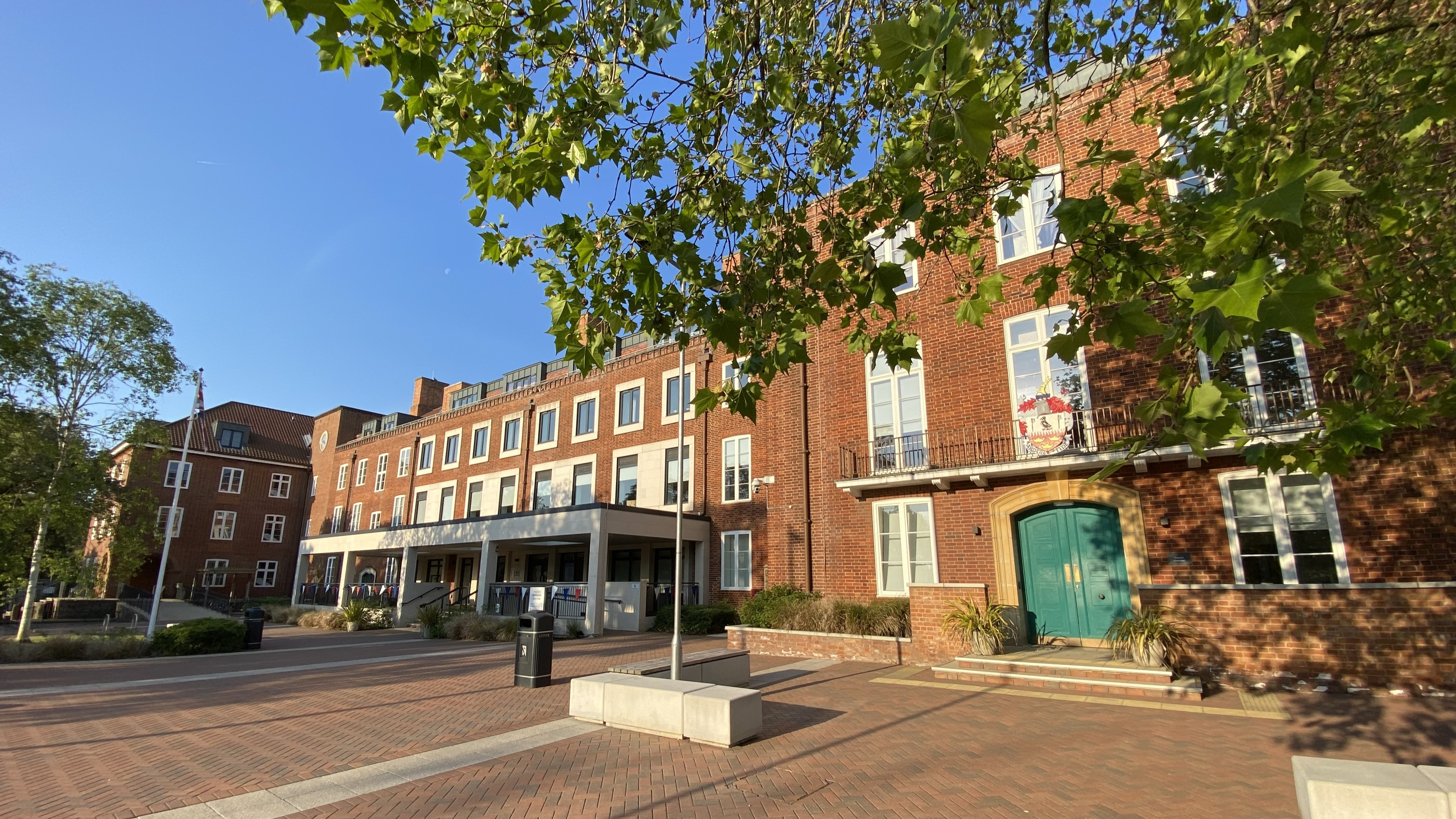
- Town Hall, Ingrave Road, Brentwood, CM15 8AY

Website
- www.brentwood.gov.uk

Brentwood Borough Council provides district-level services. County-level services are provided by Essex County Council. Parts of the borough are also covered by civil parishes, which form a third tier of local government.

=== Political control ===
The council went under no overall control at the 2023 election. A Liberal Democrat and Labour coalition subsequently formed an administration. Following the 2026 election, the coalition was expanded to also include two independent councillors.

The first election to the council was held in 1973, initially operating as a shadow authority alongside the outgoing authorities until the new arrangements came into effect on 1 April 1974. Political control of the council since 1974 has been as follows:

Party in control	Years
Conservative	1974–1990
No overall control	1990–1991
Liberal Democrats	1991–2003
No overall control	2003–2004
Conservative	2004–2014
No overall control	2014–2015
Conservative	2015–2023
No overall control	2023–present

=== Leadership ===
The role of mayor is largely ceremonial in Brentwood. Political leadership is instead provided by the leader of the council. The leaders since 1991 have been:

Councillor	Party	From	To
Chris Dale	Liberal Democrats	May 1991	Oct 1995
David Gottesmann	Liberal Democrats	Oct 1995	May 2002
Vicky Cook	Liberal Democrats	22 May 2002	Jun 2004
Brandon Lewis	Conservative	23 Jun 2004	18 Mar 2009
Louise McKinlay	Conservative	13 May 2009	May 2014
Barry Aspinell	Liberal Democrats	11 Jun 2014	May 2015
Louise McKinlay	Conservative	20 May 2015	15 May 2019
Chris Hossack	Conservative	15 May 2019	7 May 2023
Barry Aspinell	Liberal Democrats	17 May 2023	

=== Composition ===
Following the 2026 election, and a subsequent change of allegiance later in May 2026 the composition of the council was:

Party	Councillors
Liberal Democrats	16
Conservative	11
Reform	8
Labour	2
Independent	2
Total	39

The two independent councillors sit as the "Brentwood Alliance", which forms part of the council's administration alongside the Liberal Democrats and Labour.

=== Premises ===
The council is based at Brentwood Town Hall on Ingrave Road, which had been built in 1957 for the former Brentwood Urban District Council.

=== Elections ===
Since the last boundary changes in 2002, the council has comprised 37 councillors representing 15 wards; each ward elects one, two or three councillors. Elections are held three years out of every four, with roughly a third of the council being elected each time for a four-year term. In the fourth year of the cycle, when there are no elections for the borough council, elections for Essex County Council are held instead.

== Geography ==
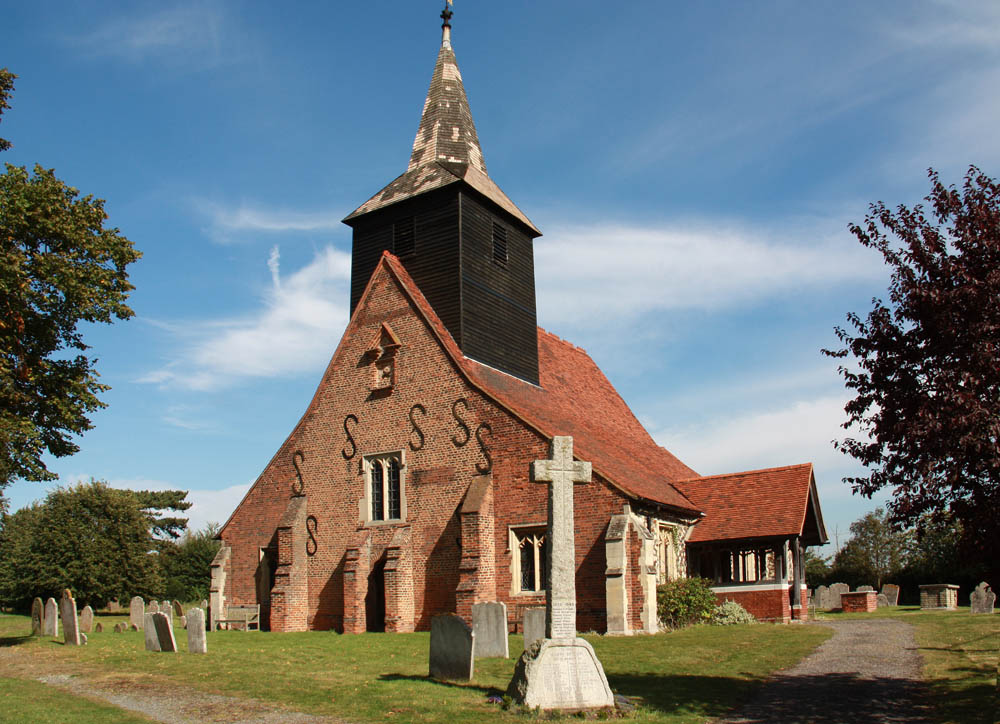
Mountnessing, one of the settlements of the borough

There are still large areas of woodland including Shenfield Common, Hartswood (named after its last private owner, a Mr. Hart), Weald Country Park, and Thorndon Country Park.

== Transport ==
The main transport links run through the borough in a south-west to north-east direction, with other important links running west to east.

=== Railway ===
Railway stations at Shenfield and Ingatestone facilitate services along the Great Eastern Main Line to Colchester, Clacton, Ipswich and London Liverpool Street; these are operated by Greater Anglia.

Brentwood and Shenfield stations are served by Greater Anglia trains between Liverpool Street, Billericay, Southend Airport and Southend Victoria; some peak hour services run to Southminster. Elizabeth line stopping trains run between London Paddington, Brentwood and Shenfield; this route is operated by MTR.

Also within the borough is West Horndon station, on the London, Tilbury & Southend line; c2c provides direct trains to London Fenchurch Street, Basildon, Southend Central and Shoeburyness.

=== Roads ===
A major trunk road running through the borough is the A12 dual-carriageway, running from East London to Chelmsford, Colchester, the ports of Harwich and Felixstowe, Ipswich and Lowestoft. The old Roman road (A1023) passes through the centre of Brentwood and joins the A12, which by-passes the town. Within different parts of Brentwood, the A1023 is called (from west to east) Brook Street, London Road, High Street, Shenfield Road, and Chelmsford Road.

The other main road in the borough is the A127 Southend Arterial Road, which separates from the A12 near Romford and then proceeds easterly to Southend-on-Sea.

== Media ==
The borough is served by a dedicated community radio station, Phoenix FM.

== Education ==
=== Secondary schools ===
- Anglo European School
- Brentwood County High School
- Brentwood School
- Brentwood Ursuline Convent School
- Becket Keys
- Shenfield High School
- St Martin's School

=== Primary schools ===
- Bentley St. Paul's Church of England School
- Blackmore Primary School
- Doddinghurst CofE Junior School
- Doddinghurst Infant School
- Hogarth Primary School
- Holly Trees Primary School
- Hutton All Saints Church of England Primary School
- Ingatestone and Fryerning Church of England Primary School
- Ingatestone Infant School
- Ingrave Johnstone Church of England Primary School
- Kelvedon Hatch Community Primary School
- Larchwood Primary School
- Long Ridings Primary School
- Mountnessing Church of England Primary School
- St. Helen's Catholic Infant School
- St. Helen's Catholic Junior School
- St. Joseph the Worker Roman Catholic Primary School
- St. Mary's Church of England Primary School
- St. Peter's Church of England Primary School
- St. Thomas of Canterbury Church of England Infant School
- St. Thomas of Canterbury Church of England Junior School
- Warley Primary School
- West Horndon Primary School
- Willowbrook Primary School (formerly Brookfield School)

=== Special schools ===
- The Endeavour School
- Grove House School

== Civil parishes and settlements in the borough ==
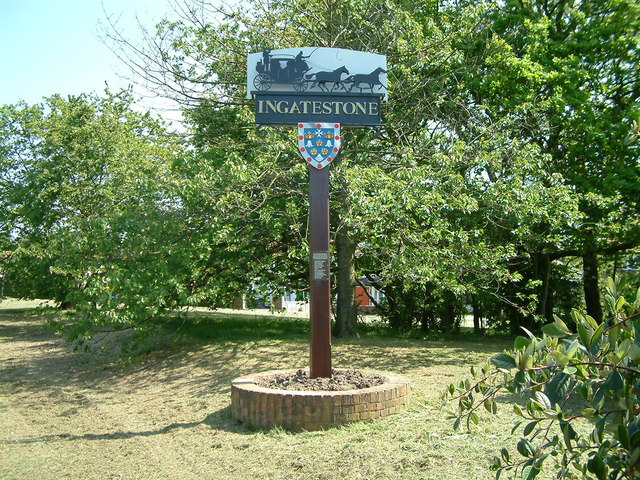
Ingatestone, one of the settlements of the borough

There are nine civil parishes in the borough. The former Brentwood Urban District is an unparished area, directly administered by Brentwood Borough Council.

Unparished

- Brentwood
  - Childerditch
  - Great Warley
  - Havering's Grove
  - Hutton
  - Little Warley
  - Pilgrims Hatch
  - Shenfield
  - South Weald
  - Warley

Parished

- Blackmore, Hook End and Wyatts Green
  - Blackmore
  - Hook End
  - Wyatts Green
- Doddinghurst
- Ingatestone and Fryerning
  - Ingatestone
  - Fryerning
- Kelvedon Hatch
- Mountnessing
- Navestock
- Stondon Massey
- Herongate and Ingrave
  - Herongate
  - Ingrave
- West Horndon

== Twinning ==
Brentwood is twinned with Roth bei Nürnberg in Germany and Montbazon in France.

== Arms ==
Coat of arms of Borough of Brentwood
Notes Originally granted to Brentwood Urban District Council on 1 August 1951. Crest On a wreath of the colours rising from the battlements of a tower Azure a demi stag Or. Escutcheon Per fesse rayonée Argent and Gules in chief a Cornish chough Proper between two pilgrim's staves erect Sable in base three ancient crowns two and one Or. Motto Ardens Fide (Burning Faith)
