= List of English abbeys, priories and friaries serving as parish churches =

This is a list of former monastic buildings in England that continue in use as parish churches or chapels of ease.

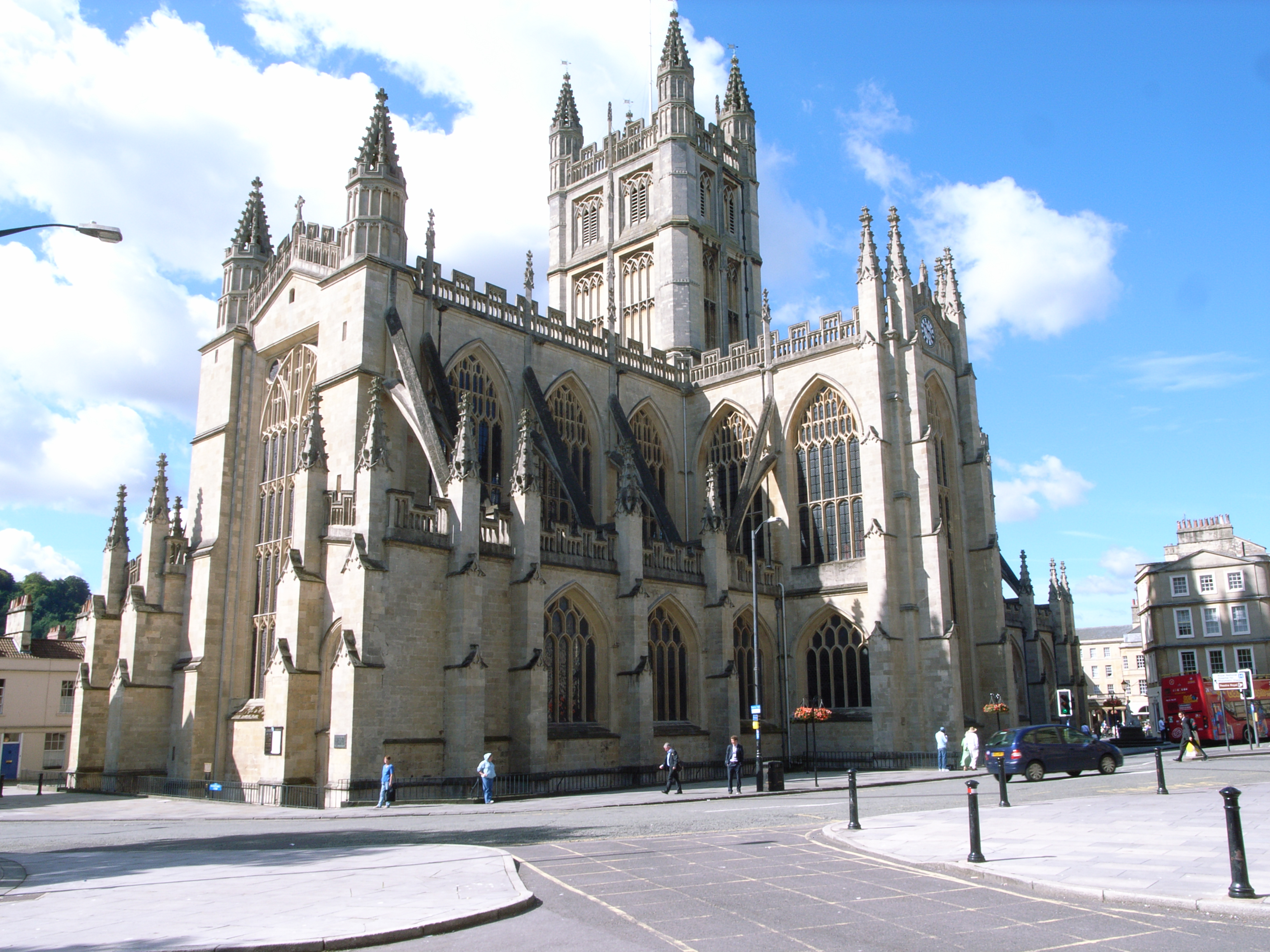
Bath Abbey

Nearly a thousand religious houses (abbeys, priories and friaries) were founded in England and Wales during the medieval period, accommodating monks, friars or nuns who had taken vows of obedience, poverty and chastity; each house was led by an abbot or abbess, or by a prior or prioress. By their foundation monasteries and nunneries (although not friaries) had acquired endowments of land, property and parochial tithes, and many had become further enriched through subsequent bequests and pilgrim donations. The majority of these houses had come into existence between the 11th and 13th centuries, but by the 14th century decline had set in, hastened by the Black Death in the middle of the century. Later medieval benefactors increasingly regarded charitable and educational establishments, parish and collegiate churches as more appropriate recipients of bequests and donations; and by the early 16th century some religious communities had become very small, and few were more than half full. In those years a number were amalgamated or dissolved through the initiatives of reforming bishops, the wealth released being used to endow grammar schools and colleges at Oxford and Cambridge Universities.

The process that has come to be known as the Dissolution of the Monasteries began formally in 1536 following the Act for Suppression of the Lesser Monasteries. This transferred the lands and the property of religious houses with an income of less than £200 (equivalent to £140,000 in 2025) a year to the crown. The motives behind this are complex, and include Henry VIII's conflict with the popes over his desire for a divorce, which led to the foundation of the Church of England; and also Henry's ambition to increase the income of the crown. Under this first Act, about one-third of the religious houses were closed. This resulted in the rebellion known as the Pilgrimage of Grace. The rebellion failed, and the process of dissolution was extended; abbots, abbesses and priors were placed under increasing pressure and threats in order to persuade them to surrender their monasteries to the crown; four who refused being accused of treason and executed. The last religious house to close was Waltham Abbey in March 1540.

The wealth and properties of the monasteries came into the ownership of the crown, although much was soon sold off; but what happened to the buildings of the abbeys, priories and friaries themselves varied. Most of them were immediately stripped of their valuable lead roofs, and fell into decay. Parts of some were converted into mansions by new owners. But, in around ten per cent of cases, former monastic churches or other buildings have continued in religious use for parochial worship. This was necessarily the case for that small number of religious houses where part already functioned as a full parish church, as at Wymondham Abbey. Secondly, there were a number of instances where wealthy parishes, or their benefactors, purchased a former monastic church as a replacement parish church building, as at Selby Abbey. Thirdly were those cases where part of a monastic church building was already in parochial use as a chapel of ease served by a stipendiary priest, in which case the dissolution commissioners would seek, if possible, for these clergy to continue as perpetual curates on fixed annual stipends charged against the former monastic endowments; with an appropriate portion of the monastic church retained for them to use. Priories of the Augustinian order, in particular, had been required by their rule to maintain a chapel of ease within their church for parochial worship, with the consequence that partial survival is more common for former Augustinian priory churches. Churches of dissolved friaries on the other hand, even though they had commonly served worshipping urban congregations, were rarely able to continue in parochial use as friaries lacked the foundation endowments from which a perpetual curacy might be established. Fourthly, former monastic structures that had fallen into ruin at the dissolution, or continued in secular use, were not infrequently brought back into use for parochial worship in later years out of subsequent private benefactions.

Ten medieval English cathedrals had been 'monastic', in that they had been simultaneously abbeys, and eight of these (Bath and Coventry being the exceptions) were refounded as secular cathedrals by Henry VIII. A further six former abbeys were raised to be cathedrals of newly created dioceses. Other former abbeys and priories became parish churches; of which two, Saint Albans and Southwark have become cathedrals since, while both also continuing to serve their respective parishes. In some cases the whole of a former monastic church continued as a parish church; ranging from survivals of near cathedral scale, as at Sherborne Abbey, to very modest chapels such as Aconbury Priory. More commonly it is only parts of the original church that survived in parochial use, now incorporated into the fabric of a continuing church or chapel; as for example the north aisle of the nave of Wroxall Priory. At Beaulieu Abbey, it is the refectory that has been so converted. In a few cases, such as Tilty Abbey, the gatehouse chapel, the capella ante portas, now forms the parish church. Where former monastic churches were maintained after the dissolution as chapels of ease with their clergy as perpetual curates, in almost all instances these chapels will have been raised to full parish church status in the course of the 19th century.

118 former monastic buildings in England that have continued to function as parish churches or chapels of ease since the dissolution of the monasteries are included in this list, including some whose monastic functions had ceased much earlier; and also some whose conversion to parochial use happened in recent centuries. Churches are only listed where they maintain in situ at least some substantial elements of their former monastic fabric, the extent of which is noted. Excluded are those former monastic churches that have never functioned for parochial worship, including some, such as the chapel of Jesus College, Cambridge, that have remained otherwise in continuous religious use; and also those churches converted into cathedrals by Henry VIII. All these surviving monastic churches have been listed by English Heritage, most at Grade I, the others at Grade II* or II.

== Key ==
Grade	Criteria
Grade I	Buildings of exceptional interest, sometimes considered to be internationally important.
Grade II*	Particularly important buildings of more than special interest.
Grade II	Buildings of national importance and special interest.

== Works ==
Name	Location	Photograph	Order	Notes	Grade
Aconbury Priory	Aconbury, Herefordshire; 51.9974°N 2.7021°W		Augustine canonesses	The former parish Church of St John the Baptist (now redundant) retains the whole priory church, nave and chancel.	II*
Amesbury Abbey	Amesbury, Wiltshire; 51.1719°N 1.7843°W		Benedictine nuns	The Church of St Mary and St Melor has been developed from the whole priory church, apart from the west end of the nave.	I
Atherstone Priory	Atherstone, Warwickshire; 52.5786°N 1.5463°W		Austin friars	St Mary's church incorporates the chancel and the central tower of the priory.	II*
Barking Abbey	Barking, London 51.53544202°N 0.07588573°E		Benedictine nuns	The chancel of the church of St. Margaret incorporates a parochial chapel erected in the abbey grounds, extended after the Reformation using piers and arches from the former abbey.	I
Bath Abbey	Bath, Somerset; 51.3815°N 2.3587°W		Benedictine	The church of St Peter and St Paul has been developed from the whole former monastic cathedral church.	I
Beauchief Abbey	Beauchief, Derbyshire; 53.3332°N 1.5008°W		Premonstratensian	The west tower is all that survives of the former abbey church; to which a private chapel was added in the 17th century; that since 1923 has served as the parish church of St Thomas a Beckett.	II*
Beaulieu Abbey	Beaulieu, Hampshire; 50.8212°N 1.4501°W		Cistercian	The Church of the Blessed Virgin and Child has been developed from the refectory.	I
Binham Priory	Binham, Norfolk; 52.9203°N 0.9464°E		Benedictine	St Mary's Church has been developed from the nave of the priory.	I
Birkenhead Priory	Birkenhead, Merseyside; 53.3894°N 3.0114°W		Benedictine	The chapter house was converted after the dissolution as a parochial chapel for Birkenhead. In the 19th century, the parish church of St Mary (now ruined) was built alongside.	II*
Bishopsgate St Helen's Priory	Bishopsgate, Greater London; 51.5148°N 0.0818°W		Benedictine nuns	St Helen's Church unites the formerly separate priory and parochial churches.	I
Blackmore Priory	Blackmore, Essex; 51.6904°N 0.3178°E		Augustinian	The Church of St Laurence has been developed from the nave of the priory.	I
Blanchland Abbey	Blanchland, Northumberland; 54.8484°N 2.0541°W		Premonstratensian	St Mary's Church incorporates the nave, the north transept and tower from the abbey church.	I
Blyth Priory	Blyth, Nottinghamshire; 53.3788°N 1.0634°W		Benedictine	The Church of St Mary and St Martin unites the monastic nave with the parochial aisle.	I
Bolton Priory	Bolton Abbey, North Yorkshire; 53.9838°N 1.8886°W		Augustinian	St Mary's Church has been developed from the nave of the priory church.	I
Bourne Abbey	Bourne, Lincolnshire; 52.7663°N 0.3757°W		Augustinian	The Church of St Peter and St Paul incorporates the nave and tower of the abbey.	I
Boxgrove Priory	Boxgrove, West Sussex; 50.8600°N 0.7109°W		Benedictine	The Church of St Mary and St Blaize incorporates the chancel and the central tower of the priory church.	I
Breedon Priory	Breedon on the Hill, Leicestershire; 52.7024°N 1.0383°W		Augustinian	The Church of St Mary and St Hardulph incorporates the chancel and the central tower of the priory.	I
Bridlington Priory	Bridlington, East Yorkshire; 54.0944°N 0.2018°W		Augustinian	St Mary's Church has been developed from the nave of the priory church.	I
Brinkburn Priory	Brinkburn, Northumberland; 55.2789°N 1.8189°W		Augustinian	The Priory Church of St. Peter and St. Paul retains the whole of the priory church, restored and re-roofed in the 19th century.	I
Bristol St James' Priory	Bristol; 51.4587°N 2.5930°W		Benedictine	The nave has been retained from the priory, but is much altered.	I
Bromfield Priory	Bromfield, Shropshire; 52.3868°N 2.7626°W		Benedictine	St Mary's Church consists of the nave, the north aisle, the former crossing (now the chancel), and the tower.	I
Bungay Priory	Bungay, Suffolk; 52.4556°N 1.4380°E		Benedictine nuns	St Mary's Church incorporates the nave of the priory church.	I
Carisbrooke Priory	Carisbrooke, Isle of Wight; 50.6914°N 1.3133°W		Benedictine	St Mary's parish church is formed from the nave of the priory church.	I
Canons Ashby Priory	Canons Ashby, Northamptonshire; 52.1500°N 1.1568°W		Augustinian	St Mary's Church incorporates the tower and part of the nave.	I
Cartmel Priory	Cartmel, Cumbria; 54.2011°N 2.9524°W		Augustinian	The whole of the priory church has been developed into the Church of St Mary.	I
Chetwold Priory	Chetwode, Buckinghamshire; 51.9630°N 1.0693°W		Augustinian	The chancel remains as the church of St Mary and St Nicholas, but has been much rebuilt.	I
Chirbury Priory	Chirbury, Shropshire; 52.5794°N 3.0915°W		Augustinian	St Michael's Church has incorporated the nave and the west tower.	I
Christchurch Priory	Christchurch, Dorset; 50.7322°N 1.7744°W		Augustinian	Holy Trinity church has been developed from the whole of the priory church.	I
Clerkenwell St John's Priory	Clerkenwell, London; 51.5220°N 0.1025°W		Knights Hospitaller	The crypt of the priory church survives below the parish church of St John Clerkenwell.	I
Coggeshall Abbey	Coggeshall, Essex; 51.8683°N 0.6910°E		Cistercian	The gatehouse chapel has been made into the Church of St Nicholas.	I
Cranborne Priory	Cranborne, Dorset; 50.9187°N 1.9238°W		Benedictine	The Church of St Mary and St Bartholomew was formerly the priory church.	I
Croyland Abbey	Crowland, Lincolnshire; 52.6764°N 0.1651°W		Benedictine	The north aisle of the abbey has been converted into the parish church of St Mary, St Bartholomew and St Guthlac.	I
Dale Abbey	Dale Abbey, Derbyshire; 52.9429°N 1.3507°W		Premonstratensian	All Saints parish church is converted from the former infirmary chapel, and adjoins a farmhouse (which was once a pub).	I
Davington Priory	Davington, Kent; 51.3193°N 0.8845°E		Benedictine nuns	The Church of St Mary Magdalen and St Lawrence incorporates the nave and tower of the priory.	II*
Deeping St. James Priory	Deeping St. James, Lincolnshire; 52.6717°N 0.2896°W		Benedictine	St James' Church incorporates the nave of the priory.	I
Deerhurst Priory	Deerhurst, Gloucestershire; 51.9680°N 2.1900°W		Benedictine	St Mary's Church, Deerhurst contains the tower and the nave of the priory.	I
Dorchester Abbey	Dorchester on Thames, Oxfordshire; 51.6436°N 1.1643°W		Augustinian	The Church of St Peter and St Paul has been developed from the whole of the abbey church.	I
Dore Abbey	Abbey Dore, Herefordshire; 51.9687°N 2.8935°W		Cistercian	St Mary's Church incorporates the chancel, transepts, and the tower of the abbey.	I
Dunstable Priory	Dunstable, Bedfordshire; 51.8860°N 0.5176°W		Augustinian	Most of the nave and the northwest tower remain as the church of St Peter.	I
Dunster Priory	Dunster, Somerset; 51.1833°N 3.4458°W		Benedictine	St George's Church has developed from the priory church.	I
Edington Priory	Edington, Wiltshire; 51.2789°N 2.1069°W		Bonshommes	The Church of St Mary, St Katherine and All Saints has been developed from the whole priory church.	I
Elstow Abbey	Elstow, Bedfordshire; 52.1150°N 0.4694°W		Benedictine nuns	The church of St Mary and St Helena consists of most of the nave and the detached tower of the abbey church.	I
Farewell Priory	Farewell, Staffordshire; 52.7022°N 1.8783°W		Benedictine nuns	St Bartholomew's Church incorporates the chancel from the priory church.	II*
Freiston Priory	Freiston, Lincolnshire; 52.9736°N 0.0497°E		Benedictine	St James' Church has incorporated the nave and the tower.	I
Great Bricett Priory	Great Bricett, Suffolk; 52.1169°N 0.9762°E		Augustinian	The nave of the priory church is incorporated in the Church of St Mary and St Laurence.	I
Great Malvern Priory	Malvern, Worcestershire; 52.1105°N 2.3288°W		Benedictine	The Church of St Mary and St Michael has been developed from the priory church; which survives complete, other than for the south transept.	I
Gresley Priory	Church Gresley, Derbyshire; 52.7598°N 1.5669°W		Augustinian	The Church of Saint Mary and Saint George incorporates part of the nave of the priory.	II*
Hatfield Broad Oak Priory	Hatfield Broad Oak, Essex; 51.8269°N 0.2430°E		Benedictine	The west tower remains and the Church of St Mary the Virgin has been developed from the nave of the priory.	I
Hatfield Peverel Priory	Hatfield Peverel, Essex; 51.7690°N 0.6029°E		Benedictine	St Andrew's church has been developed from the nave of the priory.	II*
Hexham Priory	Hexham, Northumberland; 54.9716°N 2.1026°W		Augustinian	St Andrew's Priory Church incorporates the chancel, the transepts, and the central tower.	I
Heynings Priory	Knaith, Lincolnshire; 53.3520°N 0.7577°W		Cistercian nuns	The nave of St Mary's Church, Knaith may reuse the transept from the priory church.	II*
Holm Cultram Abbey	Abbeytown, Cumbria; 54.8454°N 3.2829°W		Cistercian	Most of the nave has survived as St Mary's Church, Abbeytown.	I
Hurley Priory	Hurley, Berkshire; 51.5495°N 0.8103°W		Benedictine	The nave from the former priory remains as the church of St Mary.	II*
Ingham Priory	Ingham, Norfolk; 52°46′45″N 1°32′38″E		Trinitarian Canons	The parish church is converted from the priory church, which survives complete.	I
Jarrow Priory	Jarrow, Tyne and Wear; 54.9804°N 1.4723°W		Benedictine	The tower remains, and the original nave forms the chancel of St Paul's Church.	I
Kirkstead Abbey	Kirkstead, Lincolnshire; 53.1362°N 0.2224°W		Cistercian	The gatehouse chapel has been converted into the church of St Leonard's Without.	I
Kirby Bellars Priory	Kirby Bellars, Leicestershire; 52.7563°N 0.9382°W		Augustinian Canons Regular	The Parish Church of Saint Peter's, which was probably the priory church, survives with only the north aisle missing. There are earthworks in the field to the north of the church where the priory house once stood.	I
Kyme Priory	South Kyme, Lincolnshire; 53.0326°N 0.2588°W		Augustinian	The western end of the south aisle of the priory has been incorporated in the Church of St Mary and All Saints.	II*
Lancaster Priory	Lancaster, Lancashire; 54.0507°N 2.8057°W		Benedictine afterwards Bridgettine Canons	Formerly an alien cell of Sees in Normandy, and given to the Bridgettines of Syon Abbey in 1414. The 15th century parish church of St. Mary also served for the male canons.	I
Lanercost Priory	Lanercost, Cumbria; 54.9661°N 2.6951°W		Augustinian	The nave is used as the parish church of St Mary Magdelene.	I
Lapley Priory	Lapley, Staffordshire; 52.7139°N 2.1903°W		Benedictine	All Saints Church incorporates the chancel, nave and tower of the priory church.	I
Lastingham Abbey	Lastingham, North Yorkshire; 54.304°N 0.882°W		Benedictine	St Mary's church consists of the apse, chancel, crossing and crypt of the abbey church, all built following the founding of the abbey in 1078. However, in 1086 the community moved to St Mary's Abbey, York, and the building became a parish church.	I
Lenton Priory	Lenton, Nottinghamshire; 52.9485°N 1.1753°W		Cluniac	St Anthony's parish church is a 19th-century rebuilding of the infirmary chapel of the priory.	II
Leominster Priory	Leominster, Herefordshire; 52.2294°N 2.7357°W		Benedictine	The monastic nave and west tower have been united with the former parochial nave and aisle into the Priory Church of St Peter and St Paul.	I
Leonard Stanley Priory	Leonard Stanley, Gloucestershire; 51.7277°N 2.2877°W		Augustinian; later Benedictine	St Swithin's Church has been developed from the whole of the priory.	I
Letheringham Priory	Letheringham, Suffolk; 52.1790°N 1.3165°E		Augustinian	St Mary's Church incorporates the tower and the nave of the priory church.	II*
Little Dunmow Priory	Little Dunmow, Essex; 51.8651°N 0.4038°E		Augustinian	The parish church of St Mary has been converted from the lady chapel of the priory church.	I
Little Malvern Priory	Little Malvern, Worcestershire; 52.0614°N 2.3366°W		Benedictine	St Giles' Church incorporates the chancel and the crossing tower of the priory church.	I
Malmesbury Abbey	Malmesbury, Wiltshire; 51.5847°N 2.0984°W		Benedictine	The Church of St Mary and St Aldhelm has been developed from the nave of the abbey church, and the south porch has been retained.	I
Malton Priory	Old Malton, North Yorkshire; 54.1426°N 0.7790°W		Gilbertine	The Priory Church of St Mary has retained part of the nave and the southwest tower.	I
Marrick Priory	Marrick, North Yorkshire; 54.2232°N 1.5356°W		Benedictine nuns	The church of St Andrew continued in use as a chapel of ease until 1948, with the tower surviving from the priory. Now converted into an outdoor education centre and retreat house.	II*
Merevale Abbey	Merevale, Warwickshire; 52.5766°N 1.5728°W		Cistercian	The Church of Our Lady has been developed from the gatehouse chapel.	I
Milton Abbey	Milton Abbas, Dorset; 50.8206°N 2.2867°W		Benedictine	Choir, crossing, tower and transepts survive of the abbey church; in use after the reformation as the chapel of ease for the estate village of Milton Abbas; and since 1954, for a public school.	I
Minster-in-Sheppey Priory	Minster, Swale, Kent; 51.4222°N 0.8120°E		Benedictine nuns	The Abbey Church of St Mary and St Sexburga incorporates the nave and part of the chancel of the abbey.	I
Monks Kirby Priory	Monks Kirby, Warwickshire; 52.4444°N 1.3199°W		Benedictine	The priory church evolved into the parish church of St Edith, Monks Kirby.	I
Monkwearmouth Priory	Monkwearmouth, Tyne and Wear; 54.9131°N 1.3749°W		Benedictine	The tower, porch and west wall of the 7th century monastic church now form the west facade of St Peter's parish church.	I
Nuneaton Priory	Nuneaton, Warwickshire; 52.5265°N 1.4773°W		Benedictine nuns	The priory church was converted into a house; but in the 19th century was rebuilt on the medieval foundations as a parish church of St Mary. The monastic crossing piers survive.	II
Nun Monkton Priory	Nun Monkton, North Yorkshire; 54.0148°N 1.2208°W		Benedictine nuns	St Mary's Church has incorporated the nave of the priory.	I
Owston Priory	Owston and Newbold, Leicestershire; 52.6639°N 0.8564°W		Augustinian	St Andrew's Church has incorporated the chancel, the tower, and a chapel from the priory.	I
Pamber Priory	Monk Sherborne, Hampshire; 51.3192°N 1.1274°W		Benedictine	The crossing, tower and chancel remain from the priory as the church of the Holy Trinity, Our Lady, and St John the Baptist.	I
Pershore Abbey	Pershore, Worcestershire; 52.1104°N 2.0775°W		Benedictine	The Church of Holy Cross with St Edburgha incorporates the chancel, the central tower, and the south transept of the abbey church.	I
Pilton Priory	Pilton, Devon; 51.0884°N 4.0625°W		Benedictine	St Mary the Virgin's Church has been converted from the priory buildings.	I
Polesworth Abbey	Polesworth, Warwickshire; 52.6190°N 1.6126°W		Benedictine nuns	St Editha's Church incorporates the nave and the north tower of the abbey church.	II*
Portchester Priory	Portchester, Hampshire; 50.8380°N 1.1164°W		Augustinian	St Mary's parish church was built as the priory church in the 12th century; but the canons moved to Southwick Priory after 20 years.	I
Ramsey Abbey	Ramsey, Cambridgeshire; 52.4491°N 0.1022°W		Benedictine	St Thomas a Beckett's Church was converted from the former hospitium or guest-hall of the abbey around 1222 CE.	I
Reading, Greyfriars Church	Reading, Berkshire; 51.4568°N 0.9765°W		Franciscan friars	The nave and transepts remain, but have been almost completely rebuilt.	I
Redlingfield Priory	Redlingfield, Suffolk; 52.294°N 1.206°E		Benedictine nuns	The nuns shared with the parish the choir of the church of St Andrew, which survives.	II
Romsey Abbey	Romsey, Hampshire; 50.9896°N 1.5013°W		Benedictine nuns	The Church of St Mary has been developed from the whole of the abbey.	I
Royston Priory	Royston, Hertfordshire; 52.0480°N 0.0234°W		Augustinian	The nave of the Church of St John the Baptist re-uses the choir of the priory.	I
Rumburgh Priory	Rumburgh, Suffolk; 52.3846°N 1.4466°E		Benedictine	The parish church of St Michael and St Felix is converted from the priory church	I
St Albans Abbey	St Albans, Hertfordshire; 51.750556°N 0.342222°W		Benedictine	At the dissolution, the Abbey Church was purchased in its entirety by the town as a parish church; and became a cathedral in 1877.	I
St Bees Priory	St Bees, Cumbria; 54.4939°N 3.5934°W		Benedictine	The nave was retained as the parish church which now also occupies the tower crossing and transepts. Chancel re-roofed as theological college 1817, restored 2012, now parish room.	I
St Germans Priory	St Germans, Cornwall; 50.3967°N 4.3095°W		Augustinian	The Church of St Germanus is developed from the nave and west towers of the priory church.	I
St Michael's Mount	St Michael's Mount, Cornwall; 50.1160°N 5.4772°W		Benedictine	The priory was suppressed by Henry V and the church continued as a chapel of ease for residents of the tidal island.	I
Selby Abbey	Selby, North Yorkshire; 53.7841°N 1.0671°W		Benedictine	Following the Dissolution the monastic church stood derelict for several decades but in 1618, the building was bought and restored by the parish of Selby, and survives in its entirety as the Church of St Mary and St Germain.	I
Sempringham Priory	Sempringham, Lincolnshire; 52.8821°N 0.3571°W		Gilbertine	Until around 1140, the first house of the Gilbertine order shared use of the parish church of St Andrew, and the surviving nave of the current church may date from that period.	I
Sherborne Abbey	Sherborne, Dorset; 50.9467°N 2.5167°W		Benedictine	At the Dissolution in 1539, the parish of Sherborne replaced its former parish church building (whose foundations are still visible) by purchasing the monastic church; which survives in its entirety as the Abbey Church of St Mary.	I
Shrewsbury Abbey	Shrewsbury, Shropshire; 52.7076°N 2.7438°W		Benedictine	The Church of the Holy Cross incorporates the abbey's nave and west tower.	I
Smithfield St Bartholomew's Priory	Smithfield, Greater London; 51.5189°N 0.0997°W		Augustinian	The chancel and crossing have been incorporated into the Church of St Bartholomew-the-Great.	I
Southwark Priory	Southwark, Greater London; 51.5061°N 0.0892°W		Augustinian	After the dissolution, the church became the parish church of St Saviour's, and was converted into a cathedral in 1905. Choir, transepts, tower and crossing survive from the priory church.	I
Stogursey Priory	Stogursey, Somerset; 51.1796°N 3.1391°W		Benedictine	St Andrew's Church has been developed from the priory church.	I
Stow Minster	Stow, Lincolnshire, 53.3276°N 0.6773°W		Benedictine	The nave, crossing and transepts of the church of Saint Mary survive from the late Saxon minster and collegiate church, which was rebuilt and refounded with Benedictine monks transferred from Eynsham Abbey in Oxfordshire in 1091, only for the monks to return to Eynsham after five years.	I
Swine Priory	Swine, East Yorkshire; 53.8063°N 0.2791°W		Cistercian nuns	St Mary's Church incorporates the chancel of the priory church.	I
Temple Church	Inner Temple, London; 51.5125°N 0.109°W		Knights Templar, then Knights Hospitaller	The church of St Mary's preserves the whole of the original Templar Church, as both a parish church and a private chapel for the Inns of Court.	I
Tewkesbury Abbey	Tewkesbury, Gloucestershire; 51.9902°N 2.1608°W		Benedictine	The present church of St Maryhas been developed from the whole of the original abbey church.	I
Thorney Abbey	Thorney, Cambridgeshire; 52.6204°N 0.1071°W		Benedictine	The present church of St Mary and St Botolph incorporates part of the abbey's nave.	I
Thurgarton Priory	Thurgarton, Nottinghamshire; 53.0356°N 0.9700°W		Augustinian	The Priory Church of St. Peter incorporates part of the nave and the tower.	I
Tilty Abbey	Tilty, Essex; 51.9142°N 0.3247°E		Cistercian	The gatehouse chapel has been developed into the Church of St Mary the Virgin.	I
Tutbury Priory	Tutbury, Staffordshire; 52.8590°N 1.6877°W		Benedictine	The nave of the priory church is incorporated in St Mary's Church.	I
Upholland Priory	Upholland, Lancashire; 53.5404°N 2.7211°W		Benedictine	The Church of St Thomas the Martyr incorporates the former chancel of the priory as its nave.	I
Waltham Abbey	Waltham Abbey, Essex; 51.6876°N 0.0035°W		Augustinian	The nave of the abbey has been converted into the Church of the Holy Cross and St Lawrence.	I
Weybourne Priory	Weybourne, Norfolk; 52.9431°N 1.1416°E		Augustinian	The nave and chancel of the parish church of All Saints abut the arcades and walls of the former monastic nave and tower.	I
Witham Charterhouse	Witham Friary, Somerset; 51.1631°N 2.3660°W		Carthusian	The lay brother's church is now used as the Parish church of the Blessed Virgin Mary, St John Baptist and All Saints, Witham Friary	I
Woodkirk Priory	Woodkirk, West Yorkshire; 53.7216°N 1.5895°W		Augustinian	St Mary's church was rebuilt in the 19th century; but retains the west tower of the medieval priory and parish church.	II
Worksop Priory	Worksop, Nottinghamshire; 53.3038°N 1.1157°W		Augustinian	The west towers, nave, and Lady chapel are incorporated in the present church of St Mary and St Cuthbert.	I
Wroxall Priory	Wroxall, Warwickshire; 52.3342°N 1.6758°W		Benedictine	The north aisle of the priory church has been incorporated in St Leonard's Church.	I
Wymondham Abbey	Wymondham, Norfolk; 52.5705°N 1.1074°E		Benedictine	The present church of St Mary and St Thomas of Canterbury has been developed from the nave of the abbey.	I
York Holy Trinity Priory	Micklegate, York, North Yorkshire; 53.9565°N 1.0891°W		Benedictine	Holy Trinity Church has retained the nave and the northwest tower of the priory church.	I

== See also ==
- List of monastic houses in England
