= Listed buildings in Bromfield, Shropshire =

Bromfield is a civil parish in Shropshire, England. It contains 44 listed buildings that are recorded in the National Heritage List for England. Of these, one is listed at Grade I, the highest of the three grades, two are at Grade II*, the middle grade, and the others are at Grade II, the lowest grade. The parish contains the village of Bromfield and the surrounding countryside. Two buildings have retained material from the 12th century, the gatehouse of Bromfield Priory, and St Mary the Virgin's Church. In the parish is a country house, Oakly Park; this and associated structures are listed. Most of the other listed buildings are houses, cottages, farmhouses and farm buildings. Others include a public house, a former corn mill, a former sawmill, a bridge, a weir, and a war memorial.

== Key ==
Grade	Criteria
I	Buildings of exceptional interest, sometimes considered to be internationally important
II*	Particularly important buildings of more than special interest
II	Buildings of national importance and special interest

== Buildings ==
Name and location	Photograph	Date	Notes	Grade
Priory Gatehouse and wall 52.38703°N 2.76383°W		12th century	The only surviving building of Bromfield Priory, the upper storey was added in the 17th century. The lower parts are in stone and brick, the upper storey is timber framed, and the roof is tiled. There are two storeys and three bays. In the centre is an arch with a hood mould, flanked by buttresses, and above it is a canted oriel window with mullioned and transomed lights. In the outer bays and elsewhere are mullioned windows. The windows have lattice glazing, and the gables have bargeboards and finials. Attached to the gatehouse is a stone wall.	II*
St Mary the Virgin's Church; 52.38679°N 2.76261°W		c. 1155	At one time a priory church, the tower was built in the 13th century and the north aisle was added, the church was altered in the 16th century, and it was restored in 1889–90 by C. Hodgson Fowler who added a vestry. The church is in sandstone with a tile roof, and consists of a nave, a north aisle, a chancel with a north vestry, and a northwest tower. The tower incorporates a porch, it has three stages, buttresses and a stair tower, and an embattled parapet. In the aisle the windows are lancets, and in the nave they are in Decorated style.	I
Burway Manor; 52.37720°N 2.73399°W	—	c. 1600	The house was altered in the 18th and 19th centuries, and was greatly enlarged in 1884. The earlier part is timber framed and encased in brick, the later part is in brick with applied timber framing, and the roofs are tiled with moulded bargeboards. The house has an L-shaped plan and two storeys, the original part has a main range and a cross-wing, and the later part extends the main range, and also has a cross-wing. The earlier part has a decorative timber verandah, and the later part has bay windows. Most of the windows are casements, and some are sashes.	II
1 Bromfield; 52.38875°N 2.76861°W	—	17th century	The house is in timber framing and brick on a plinth, and has a tile roof. There is one storey with attics, four bays, and a rear outshut. On the front is a gabled porch, the windows are casements with lattice glazing, and in the attic are four gabled dormers. The gables have scalloped and pierced bargeboards and finials.	II
2 and 3 Bromfield; 52.38834°N 2.76632°W	—	17th century	A pair of houses that were extended to the rear in the 19th century. The original part is in timber framing and brick, and the extension is in brick; the roof is tiled. There are two storeys and attics, and the houses have a T-shaped plan with a main block of two bays with a gabled cross-wing to the left. The windows are mullioned and have casement windows with lattice glazing. The main block has a doorway with a four-centred arched head, the upper floor is jettied, and there are two gabled dormers in the attics. The gables have bargeboards and finials.	II
7–10 Bromfield; 52.38810°N 2.76557°W	—	17th century	A row of four cottages built in timber framing, brick, stone and plaster on a chamfered plinth, and there is a tile roof. They have one storey with attics, and nine bays. In front of Nos. 7 and 8 is a continuous hood. The windows are mullioned and contain casement windows with lattice glazing. There are seven dormers on the front and four on the back, all gabled and tile-hung.	II
15 Bromfield; 52.38880°N 2.76226°W		17th century	A timber framed house with a thatched roof, a massive chimney stack in stone, a wing in brick, and an outshut and a porch, both with stone tiled roofs. There are two storeys, and the house has an L-shaped plan. The windows are casements, some small-paned and some with lattice glazing.	II
The Cottage; 52.37151°N 2.76778°W	—	17th century	The cottage was extended in the 19th century. It is timber framed with plaster and some brick infill, and has a tile roof. It has a T-shaped plan, with gabled wings added in the 19th century. There is a single storey with an attic, casement windows with lattice glazing and hood moulds, and gabled dormers. The gables have spike finials.	II
Forge Cottages; 52.38822°N 2.76049°W		17th century (probable)	A row of cottages and a smithy, partly timber framed with brick infill, and partly in brick with a tile roof, and with one storey and attics. The left cottage has three bays, a canted bay window, two gabled dormers, and windows with lattice glazing. The right cottage is in brick with three bays, a gabled porch, two gabled dormers, and casement windows. Between the cottages is a wide passageway with a central post, leading to a single-storey rear brick wing.	II
High Walton Farmhouse; 52.40326°N 2.76702°W	—	17th century	The farmhouse was extended in the mid-19th century. It is built in timber framing with render, stone, and brick, and has a tile roof. There is a T-shaped plan with 19th-century wings, two storeys and four bays. The central doorway has a moulded architrave, and the gables have spike finials. The windows vary: they include casements in half-dormers, mullioned windows with lattice glazing, and cross-windows.	II
Lady Halton Farmhouse; 52.37074°N 2.76832°W		17th century	The farmhouse was considerably extended in the 19th century. It is built in timber framing and brick with a Welsh slate roof, and has two storeys and two bays. There is a porch with a pentice roof, and the windows are cross-windows.	II
Whitbatch House; 52.39388°N 2.71005°W	—	17th century	The farmhouse was extended in the 19th century. The original part is timber framed with brick infill, the later part is in brick, the roof is tiled, and the house has a T-shaped plan. The original block has two storeys and two bays. To the left is a 19th-century extension with a rear wing, and a doorway with a timber porch on a brick plinth. To the right is a 19th-century cross-wing with two storeys and a cellar, and three bays. The central doorway has a moulded architrave and a porch. Most of the windows are casements and there are some cross-windows. The gables have bargeboards and spike finials.	II
Hill Halton Farmhouse; 52.37094°N 2.76237°W		Late 17th century	The farmhouse is timber framed with plaster infill, some stone, some brick, a pebbledashed gable end, and a tile roof. It has an L-shaped plan, two storeys, and a front of four bays. The windows are 20th-century casements.	II
Warwick House; 52.38838°N 2.76672°W	—	Late 17th century	Originally cottages, later combined into a house, with a rear extension added in the 19th century. The original part is timber framed with brick infill and some brick and stone, the later parallel range at the rear is in brick with applied timber framing; both parts have hipped Welsh slate roofs. There are two storeys and a front of three bays. On the front is a lattice-work porch and a doorway with a fanlight. The windows are casements; some are mullioned and others are mullioned and transomed.	II
Elm Lodge; 52.38210°N 2.72178°W	—	Early 18th century	Originating as a timber framed house, it was substantially altered and extended in the early 19th century. The extension is at right angles, and is in red brick with limestone dressings and slate roofs, and is in Regency style. Part of the original range has brick infill, there are two storeys, and it contains patio doors and casement windows. The later range has a symmetrical front, consisting of a central three-storey block and flanking two-storey wings. In the centre is a French window, and the other windows are sashes. The main entrance is at the southeast corner, and has an architrave with columns and a pediment.	II
Brick House; 52.36281°N 2.78850°W	—	Early 18th century	The house is in brick with a string course and a tile roof, and it has a rear outshut in stone. There are two storeys, a cellar and an attic, and three bays. The windows are casements, and there are two flat-roofed dormers on the front and one in the rear outshut.	II
Bridge over Teme; 52.38581°N 2.76367°W		18th century	The bridge carries a road over the River Teme. The arches are in brick, and the piers and superstructure are in stone. It has three arches, V-shaped cutwaters, a coped parapet and piers, and a curved wing wall.	II
Railings, piers and gate, South Lodge, Downton Hall; 52.39373°N 2.70941°W	—	Mid-18th century	The piers at the entrance to the drive are in ashlar stone, and have bands and capitals. The railings are on dwarf walls and have urn finials. Opposite the lodge are cast iron gate piers and a wicket gate.	II
King's Head Farmhouse; 52.38808°N 2.76725°W	—	Mid-18th century	The farmhouse is in stone, and has a tile roof with coped gable parapets. There are two storeys and attics, a symmetrical three-bay front, a stone and brick two-storey wing to the right, and a single-storey stone wing. The central porch has a moulded arch and a gable, and the doorway has a moulded architrave. The windows have three lights and hood moulds, and in the attics are gabled dormers; all have lattice glazing.	II
Oakly Park; 52.38317°N 2.75611°W		18th century	A country house that was restored by C. R. Cockerell between 1819 and 1836. It is in brick with stone dressings, rusticated quoins, and a slate roof. The main block has three storeys and a basement and nine bays, with recessed two storey wings, on the left with two bays, and on the right with three. Above the ground floor of the main block is a balustraded parapet. The outer three bays at each end form porticos, and the windows are sashes. In the east front are Venetian windows.	II*
Bridge near stable block, Oakly Park; 52.38249°N 2.75273°W	—	18th century	The bridge carries a road over a small stream. It consists of a single span, with a brick arch and the rest in stone, including a coped parapet.	II
3 Fishmore Road; 52.38448°N 2.71499°W		Early 19th century	A former toll house in brick with a Welsh slate roof, partly hipped. It has two storeys and two bays, the left bay forming an octagonal tower, and the right bay a wing. In the wing is a doorway with a pentice hood and a former toll niche to the right. Most of the windows have two lights with span-arched heads and two-piece pointed lintels. To the right is a screen wall with three niches and a lean-to at the rear.	II
Clive Arms; 52.38831°N 2.76157°W		Early 19th century	A house, later a public house, it has a brick front, stone side walls, and a hipped Welsh slate roof. There are three storeys and a symmetrical front of three bays. The central doorway has a large fanlight and a segmental arch. The windows on the front are sashes, and on the sides they are casements.	II
Clive House; 52.38838°N 2.76218°W		Early 19th century	A brick house with a tile roof, a double L-shaped plan, three storeys, and a symmetrical front of three bays. There is a single-storey wing to the rear right, and a small rear wing with dentilled eaves. The central doorway has a moulded architrave and a fanlight, and a timber gabled porch with bargeboards and a pendant. The windows in the outer bays have three-lights and are mullioned and transomed, and between is a cross-window.	II
South Lodge, Downton Hall; 52.39378°N 2.70927°W		Early 19th century	The lodge is at the southwest entrance to the hall. It is in stone with a Welsh slate roof, and consists of a two-storey octagonal tower with a pyramidal roof, and a wing to the left with one storey and an attic. The tower has a porch with a pentice roof and an ornamental fascia. The windows are casements, and in the wing is a gabled dormer with cusped bargeboards.	II
Estate Office, workshops and dwellings, Oakly Park; 52.38669°N 2.76355°W	—	Early 19th century	A row of buildings serving different purposes. They are in brick with stone at the rear. and have tiled roofs with coped gable parapets. There are two storeys, and a projecting gabled wing at the rear. Most of the windows are mullioned casements.	II
Stable Complex, Oakly Park; 52.38281°N 2.75314°W	—	Early 19th century	The stable complex, later converted for residential use, is in brick with a slate roof. It has an E-shaped plan, two storeys, and a central projecting entrance bay. The windows are mullioned casements and cross-windows, and on the roof is a louvred turret.	II
Railings, piers and gates, Oakly Park Lodge; 52.38492°N 2.76274°W		Early 19th century	At the entrance to the drive to Oakly Park are two pairs of cast iron gates on pillars with ball finials, and dwarf sandstone walls with spearhead railings. These are flanked by piers with moulded capitals.	II
Oakly Park Lodge; 52.38483°N 2.76271°W		1826	The lodge, designed by C. R. Cockerell, is in brick on a stone plinth, with stone dressings and a Welsh slate roof. It has a rectangular plan, one storey and an attic, a single-bay front, and three-bay sides. The recessed entrance has pilasters and a full-height arch rising into an open pediment. The doorway has a moulded architrave, above which is a cornice and a relief head of a Greek kouros. Along the sides are casement windows, a moulded band, and modillion eaves, and on the right side is a gabled dormer. At the rear is a basement area enclosed by a semicircular wall.	II
11 Bromfield; 52.38774°N 2.76521°W	—	1848	A stone house with a tile roof, one storey and an attic, and a two-bay front facing the road. The right bay projects, it is gabled, and contains a canted bay window on scrolled consoles. In the angle to the left is a porch with a pentice roof. In the left bay is a two-light mullioned window with a hood mould, and above is a gabled dormer. There are similar windows in the right return. The windows have lattice glazing, and the gables have cusped bargeboards and spike finials.	II
4 Bromfield; 52.38823°N 2.76580°W	—	Mid-19th century	A stone house with a tile roof, it has a single storey with an attic, two bays, and a single-story wing to the left. On the front is a gabled porch, a mullioned window to the left, and two gabled dormers in the attic. The windows are casements, and all the gables have scalloped bargeboards and spike finials.	II
16 Old Field; 52.38887°N 2.74333°W		Mid-19th century	A house in timber framing, stone and brick with a tile roof. There are two storeys and two bays. The stone porch is gabled, and the doorway has a chamfered surround. The windows are mullioned casements, and the gables have bargeboards and spike finials.	II
Corn mill 52.38575°N 2.76261°W		19th century	The former mill is built in stone and brick and has a tile roof. There are two storeys, with a main block to the right, and a lower wing to the left. The main block has a projecting gable on the left, and a gabled porch on the right containing an opening with a chamfered arch, with a window between. The wing contains an arch over the mill race. The windows vary: most are mullioned or mullioned and transomed, and some are casements. Most have hood moulds and lattice glazing.	II
Balustrade and retaining wall, Oakly Park; 52.38324°N 2.75556°W	—	19th century	The balustrade and retaining wall is to the east of the hall. The bulbous balusters are in cast iron, and the rest is in ashlar stone; this includes moulded coping, and four pillars surmounted by urns.	II
Onny Cottage; 52.38913°N 2.76796°W	—	Mid-19th century	A brick house with a tile roof, two storeys, five bays, and a rear wing. On the front is a simple porch and a canted bay window to the left. The windows are a mix of sashes, and mullioned windows.	II
Post Office; 52.38844°N 2.76238°W		Mid-19th century	A brick house with a tile roof, and an L-shaped plan. There is a single storey and an attic, a front of two bays, a rear wing, and an annex to the left. On the front is a gabled timber framed porch. The flanking windows are mullioned casements with segmental heads, above are gabled dormers, and in the annex are twin cross-windows under gables; all have lattice glazing. The gables have ornamental bargeboards.	II
Sawmill; 52.38614°N 2.76337°W		19th century	The former sawmill is in stone and brick and has a tile roof. It has an L-shaped plan, a single storey with a basement, and three bays. At the rear is a wheelhouse that has a gable with ornamental bargeboards and a pendant-finial. The windows have lattice glazing.	II
Stead Vallets Farmhouse; 52.37925°N 2.79717°W	—	Mid-19th century	A brick farmhouse with modillion eaves, a tile roof, three storeys, three bays, and a two-storey rear wing with an outshut. The central doorway has a fanlight with a cambered head. This is flanked by cross-windows with chamfered surrounds and segmental heads, and above are mullioned casements.	II
The Poles Farmhouse; 52.36814°N 2.78431°W	—	Mid-19th century	A stone farmhouse with a Welsh slate roof, three storeys, three bays, and rear wings. In the ground floor are two bay windows and a cross-window, and the other windows are mullioned with lattice glazing. In the roof are three dormers that have gables with spike finials. In the left return is a porch with a gable parapet.	II
Courtyard range, The Poles Farm; 52.36766°N 2.78447°W	—	Mid-19th century	A complex consisting of ranges of buildings enclosing a courtyard, in stone with tiled roofs. They contain a variety of buildings, including a granary, pigsties, a stable, cowsheds, a boiler house, and a blacksmith's workshop.	II
The Poplars; 52.38764°N 2.76343°W		Mid-19th century	A stone house with a tile roof, a T-shaped plan, one storey, a front of two bays, and a rear wing. In the centre is a gabled porch with a spike finial. The windows have moulded mullions, moulded lintels and hood moulds. In the left return is a canted bay window.	II
Weir; 52.38589°N 2.76345°W		19th century	The weir is in the River Teme and served a sawmill and a cornmill. It is in stone and has a V-shaped plan, with a cutwater and coping. Some sluice equipment has been retained.	II
Bromfield Manor House; 52.38744°N 2.76439°W		Late 19th century	Originally a rectory, later used for other purposes, it is in red sandstone, it has a tile roof with coped gables, and high brick chimneys. There is a double-depth plan, and two storeys with an attic and cellars. Most of the windows are casements with hood moulds, there is a mullioned and transomed window and a dormer, and the porch has a four-centred arch.	II
War memorial 52.38728°N 2.76334°W		1921	The war memorial is in the churchyard of St Mary's Church. It is in limestone, and has a rectangular platform, a three-stepped base and a plinth. On the plinth is a hexagonal shaft surmounted by a ball and a cross. On the plinth is an inscription, and on the base are the names of those lost in the two World Wars and in a later conflict.	II
