= Joseph Bowles (cricketer) =

English cricketer

Joseph Bowles (christened 6 July 1798 – 8 February 1879) was an English first-class cricketer active 1834–35 who played for Oxford University. He was born in Farringdon, Berkshire and died in Stanton Lacy, Shropshire. He appeared in two first-class matches.

Bowles was educated at Magdalen Hall, Oxford (now Hertford College). After graduating he became a Church of England priest and was rector of Woodstock, Oxfordshire from 1841 to 1847, then Stanton Lacy in Shropshire from 1847 until his death. He married Ellen Mary Walker, daughter of Sir William Walker of Leicestershire.

== Bibliography ==
- Haygarth, Arthur (1996) [1862]. Scores & Biographies, Volume 1 (1744–1826). Kennington: Frederick Lillywhite. ISBN 978-19-00592-23-9.
- Haygarth, Arthur (1997) [1862]. Scores & Biographies, Volume 2 (1827–1840). Kennington: Frederick Lillywhite. ISBN 978-19-00592-23-9.
