= St Mary the Virgin's Church, Bromfield =

Coordinates: 52.3868°N 2.7625°W

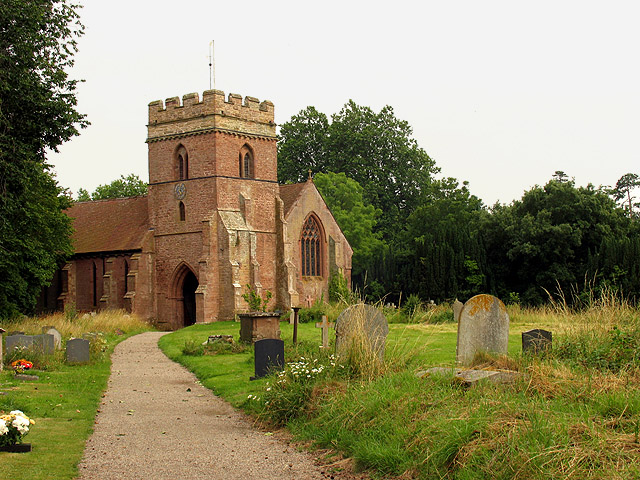
- St Mary the Virgin's Church, Bromfield, from the northwest

- Location in Shropshire
- OS grid reference: SO 482 768
- Location: Bromfield, Shropshire
- Country: England
- Denomination: Anglican
- Website: St Mary, Bromfield

History
- Status: Parish church

Architecture
- Functional status: Active
- Heritage designation: Grade I
- Designated: 12 November 1952
- Architect: C. Hodgson Fowler (restoration)
- Architectural type: Church
- Style: Norman, Gothic, Gothic Revival

Specifications
- Materials: Sandstone, tiled roofs

Administration
- Province: Canterbury
- Diocese: Hereford
- Archdeaconry: Ludlow
- Deanery: Ludlow
- Parish: Bromfield

Clergy
- Rector: Revd Fr Justin Trevelyan Parker

St Mary the Virgin's Church is a former priory church in the village of Bromfield, Shropshire, England. It is an active Anglican parish church in the deanery of Ludlow, the archdeaconry of Ludlow, and the diocese of Hereford. Its benefice is united with those of 5 other parishes to form the Bromfield Benefice. The church is recorded in the National Heritage List for England as a designated Grade I listed building.

== History ==
The church was built as a parish church before the Norman conquest and was described as being "a wealthy minster of royal foundation". Bromfield Priory was also in existence before the Norman conquest; it was served by twelve canons, and has a relatively detailed description in the Domesday Book. Monks were gradually introduced to the priory, and when Henry II granted it a charter as a Benedictine priory in 1155, both canons and monks were part of the establishment. Following that, the priory became subject to Gloucester Abbey, its priors being appointed by the Abbot of Gloucester. The priory took over part of the existing parish church. This had been rebuilt in the 12th century with a cruciform plan, possibly with a central tower at the crossing. At some time the tower and the north transept disappeared, possibly following the fall of the tower. The present northwest tower was built during the 13th century. It is thought that the priory used the crossing (which later became the chancel) and the south transept for its services, while the lay congregation used the western part of the church. The vicar of the church was appointed by the prior.

Following the Dissolution of the Monasteries, in 1541 the church and priory were leased to Charles Foxe, who purchased the property in 1558. He converted parts of the church into a house. The chancel (the former crossing) was divided into two storeys, and the south transept was converted to form the rest of the house. Meanwhile, the nave, north aisle and north porch continued to be used as the parish church. In the 17th century the house was damaged by fire, and Foxe's descendants moved away. The chancel was restored and incorporated into the parish church. The south transept and the priory buildings no longer exist, but remains of Foxe's house are still present, attached to the south side of the church. The church was restored in 1889–90 by C. Hodgson Fowler who added windows on the south side, and a north vestry.

== Architecture ==
=== Exterior ===
St Mary's is constructed in sandstone with tiled roofs. Its plan consists of a nave, north aisle, chancel, and northwest tower. The tower has three stages, the lowest stage containing a porch. This has a north doorway, above which is a lancet window. On the west side of the tower is a pair of buttresses, between which is a stair turret. Each bell opening contains two lights under a pointed arch. The parapet is embattled. Along the north aisle are lancet windows between shallow buttresses. The 19th-century windows on the south side of the church contain Decorated-style tracery. A fragment of Foxe's house remains on the south side of the church. At the east end is a blocked round-headed Norman arch, which was originally the chancel arch. Inserted into this is a blocked three-light Perpendicular window, and above it in the gable is a blocked mullioned window remaining from Foxe's conversion.

=== Interior ===
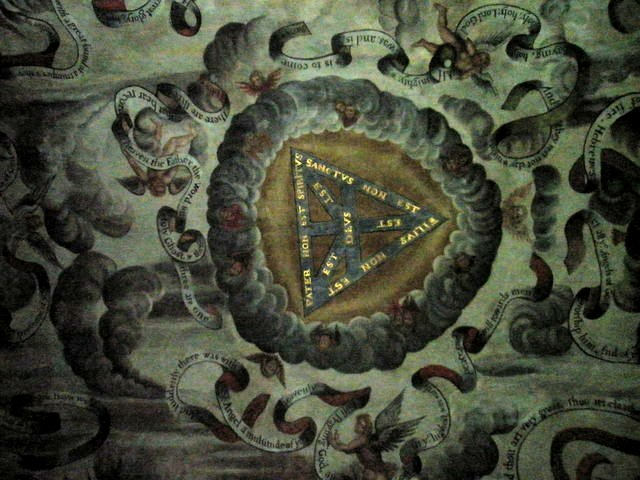
Ceiling painting in the chancel

Between the nave and the north aisle is a two-bay arcade in Early English style. In the east wall of the chancel is a re-set piscina, and the south wall contains a 14th-century tomb recess. The ceiling of the chancel was painted in 1672 by Thomas Francis. It depicts the Shield of the Trinity surrounded by cherubs and texts, and angels holding a bible open at Psalm 85. The reredos consists of a triptych dating from about 1890 by the artist Charles Edgar Buckeridge. Also in the church are the Royal Arms of Charles II. The stained glass consists of a large series designed by Kempe dating from 1890 to 1922. The two-manual pipe organ was built in 1866 by J. W. Walker. It was reconstructed and enlarged in 1890, and overhauled in 1991, on each occasion by Walker's. There is a ring of six bells. Five of these were cast in 1737 by Abel Rudhall, and the sixth in 1890 by John Taylor and Company. The church has a Sanctus bell also made by Taylor's at about the same date.

== External features ==
The churchyard contains three war graves, those of a soldier of the King's Shropshire Light Infantry of World War I, and two Welsh Guardsmen of World War II. It also holds a burying ground for the Clive, later Windsor-Clive, family of nearby Oakly Park, notably Edward Clive, 1st Earl of Powis, his son Robert, and grandson Robert Windsor-Clive, all politicians.

== See also ==
- Grade I listed churches in Shropshire
- Listed buildings in Bromfield, Shropshire
- List of English abbeys, priories and friaries serving as parish churches
