= Passion of Saints Perpetua and Felicity =

3rd-century Christian martyrdom text

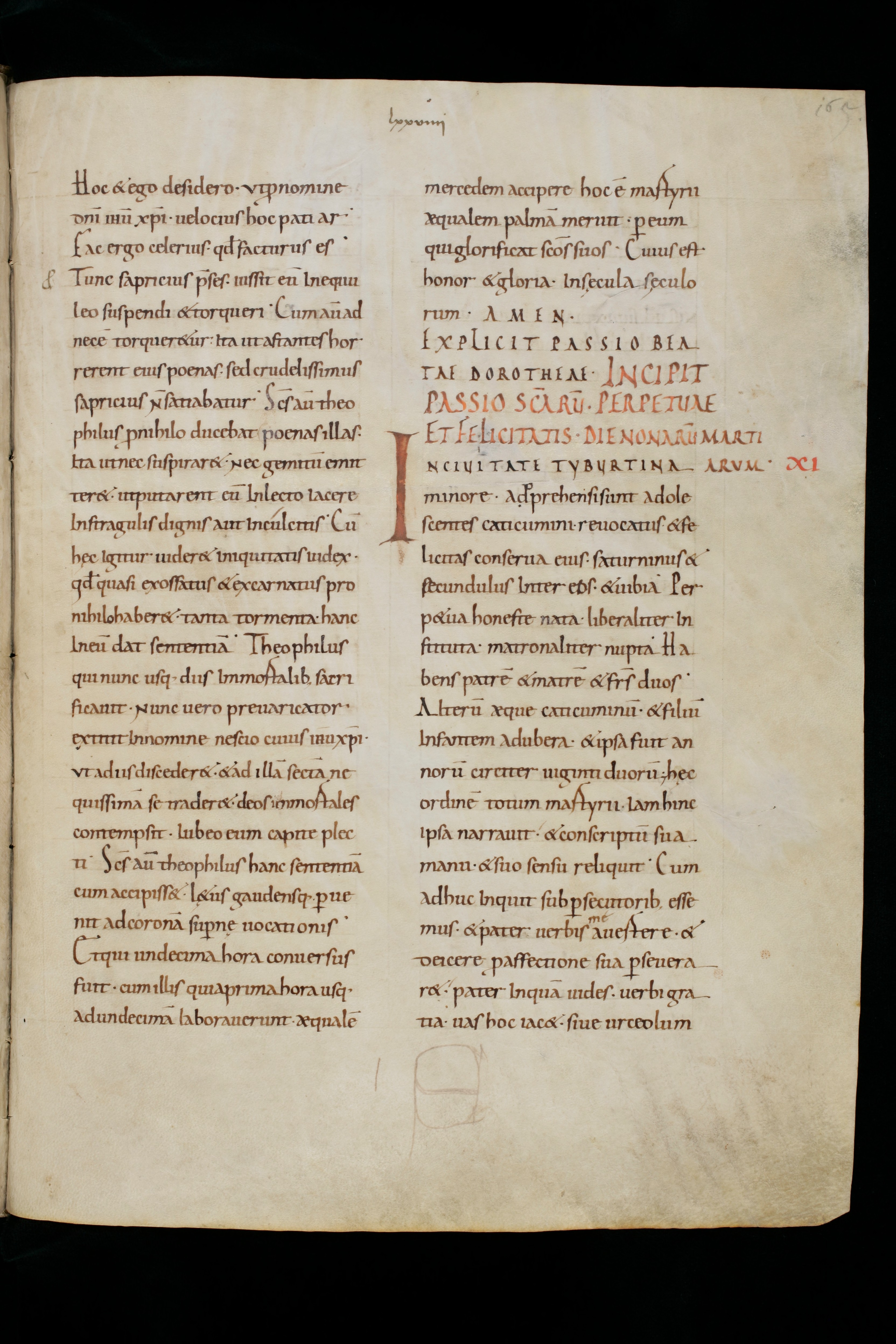
Opening page of The Passion of Saints Perpetua and Felicity in St. Gallen, Stiftsbibliothek, Cod. Sang. 577, p. 165 (9th/10th centuries).

The Passion of Saints Perpetua and Felicity (Latin: Passio sanctarum Perpetuae et Felicitatis) is a diary by Vibia Perpetua describing her imprisonment as a Christian in 203, completed after her death by a redactor. It is one of the oldest and most notable early Christian texts.

Along with the experiences of Perpetua and Felicity, the text also appears to contain, in his own words, the accounts of the visions of Saturus, another Christian martyred with Perpetua. An editor who states he was an eyewitness has added accounts of the martyrs' suffering and deaths. It survives in both Latin and Greek forms.

== Text and content ==
=== Summary of the Passion text ===
The traditional view has been that Perpetua, Felicity and the others were martyred owing to a decree of Roman emperor Septimius Severus (193–211). This is based on a reference to a decree Severus is said to have issued forbidding conversions to Judaism and Christianity, but this decree is known only from one source, the Augustan History, an unreliable mix of fact and fiction. Early church historian Eusebius describes Severus as a persecutor, but the Christian apologist Tertullian states that Severus was well disposed towards Christians, employed a Christian as his personal physician, and had personally intervened to save several high-born Christians known to him from the mob. Eusebius' description of Severus as a persecutor likely derives merely from the fact that numerous persecutions occurred during his reign, including those known in the Roman martyrology as the martyrs of Madaura as well as Perpetua and Felicity in the Roman province of Africa, but these were probably as the result of local persecutions rather than empire wide actions or decrees by Severus.

The details of the martyrdoms survive in both Latin and Greek texts (see below). Perpetua's account of events leading to their deaths, apparently historical, is written in the first person. A brief introduction by the editor (chapters i–ii) is followed by the narrative and visions of Perpetua (iii–ix), and the vision of Saturus (xi–xiii). The account of their deaths, written by the editor who claims to be an eyewitness, is included at the end (xiv–xxi).

Perpetua's account opens with conflict between her and her father, who wishes her to recant her belief. Perpetua refuses, and is soon baptized before being moved to prison (iii). After the guards are bribed, she is allowed to move to a better portion of the prison, where she nurses her child and gives its charge to her mother and brother (iii), and the child is able to stay in prison with her for the time being (iii).

At the encouragement of her brother, Perpetua asks for and receives a vision, in which she climbs a dangerous ladder to which various weapons are attached (iv). At the foot of a ladder is a serpent, which is faced first by Saturus and later by Perpetua (iv). The serpent does not harm her, and she ascends to a garden (iv). At the conclusion of her dream, Perpetua realizes that the martyrs will suffer (iv).

Perpetua's father visits her in prison and pleads with her, but Perpetua remains steadfast in her faith (v). She is brought to a hearing before the governor Hilarianus and the martyrs confess their Christian faith (vi). In a second vision, Perpetua sees her brother Dinocrates, who had died from cancer at the early age of seven (vii). She prayed for him and later had a vision of him happy and healthy, his facial disfigurement reduced to a scar (viii). Perpetua's father again visits the prison, and Pudens (the warden) shows the martyrs' honor (ix).

The day before her martyrdom, Perpetua envisions herself defeating a savage Egyptian and interprets this to mean that she would have to do battle not merely with wild beasts but with the Devil himself (x).

Saturus, who is also said to have recorded his own vision, sees himself and Perpetua transported eastward by four angels to a beautiful garden, where they meet Jocundus, Saturninus, Artaxius, and Quintus, four other Christians who are burnt alive during the same persecution (xi–xii). He also sees Bishop Optatus of Carthage and the priest Aspasius, who beseech the martyrs to reconcile the conflicts between them (xiii).

As the editor resumes the story, Secundulus is said to have died in prison (xiv). The slave Felicitas gives birth to a daughter despite her initial concern that she would not be permitted to suffer martyrdom with the others, since the law forbade the execution of pregnant women (xv). On the day of the games, the martyrs are led into the amphitheatre (xviii). At the demand of the crowd they were first scourged before a line of gladiators; then a boar, a bear, and a leopard were set on the men, and a wild cow on the women (xix). Wounded by the wild animals, they gave each other the kiss of peace and were then put to the sword (xix). The text describes Perpetua's death as follows; "But Perpetua, that she might have some taste of pain, was pierced between the bones and shrieked out; and when the swordsman's hand wandered still (for he was a novice), herself set it upon her own neck. Perchance so great a woman could not else have been slain (being feared of the unclean spirit) had she not herself so willed it" (xix). The text ends as the editor extols the acts of the martyrs.

=== Debate over editor ===
Scholars generally believe that the Passio SS Perpetuae et Felicitatis narrative was in fact, written by Perpetua. If this is true, the text is important because Perpetua is one of the first Christian female writers before the fourth century whose works have survived. The personal account of a female martyr is also rare, as the stories of other female martyrs were recorded collectively. Perpetua's style is described as "emotional", "personal", "fragmented" and "colloquial", which is fitting with the circumstances under which she would have been writing. It should still be acknowledged that the style could have been crafted to give the impression of a female martyr's diary.

Although some have suggested that the editor of the text is Tertullian, the editor's identity remains uncertain. The writing style and content of the edited material do seem to suggest that the editor is male.

Many scholars have examined the male modification and transmission of a female martyrdom story that challenged power dynamics and gender hierarchies within the organized church. This issue of gender may have influenced the redaction tendencies of the editor. Brent Shaw argues that the editor of the story rewrites Perpetua's experience in such a way that affirms the technical value of her martyrdom while simultaneously presenting her actions as unnatural. Furthermore, the dream vision of Saturus is considered to be the result of editorial activity, unlikely to have been written by Saturus himself because of its distinctive construction and impersonal bent. If the editor is male, he may have been seeking to show that men and women, rather than women alone, are responsible for the dreams and visions received in the narrative. Others argue that Felicity may have been the initial source for the dream, an attribution changed by the editor in order to circumvent the problematic implications of a female slave who can receive visions.

=== Dating issues ===
The date of their martyrdom is traditionally given as AD 203. The association of the martyrdom with a birthday festival of the Emperor Geta, however, might seem to place it after 209, when Geta was made "Augustus" (having held the junior title Caesar since 198 when his elder brother had been made "Augustus"), though before 211, when he was assassinated. The Acta notes that the martyrdom occurred in the year when Minucius Timinianus was proconsul in the Roman province of Africa, but Timinianus is not otherwise attested in history. Werner Eck notes that the Greek version of the Acta calls the proconsul Μινούκιος Ὀππιανός, or Minicius Opimianus, who is recorded as proconsul for 202/203.

== Christians challenging the traditions of the family within the text ==
In the Passion, Christian faith motivates the martyrs to reject family loyalties and acknowledge a higher authority. In the text, Perpetua's relationship with her father is the most prominently featured of all her familial ties, and she directly interacts with him four times (iii, v, vi, and ix). Perpetua herself may have deemed this relationship to be her most important, given what is known about its importance within Roman society. Fathers expected that their daughters would care for them, honor them, and enhance their family reputation through marriage. In becoming a martyr, Perpetua failed to conform to society's expectations. Perpetua and Felicity also defer their roles as mothers to remain loyal to Christ, leaving behind young children at the time of their death.

Although the narrator does describe Perpetua as "honorably married", no husband appears in the text. Possible explanations include that her husband was attempting to distance himself from the proceedings as a non-Christian, that he was away on business, or that her mention of him was edited out; because Perpetua was called a bride of Christ, omission of her husband may have been intended to reduce any sexual implications (xviii). Regardless, the absence of a husband in the text leads Perpetua to assume new family loyalties and a new identity in relation to Christ.

Perpetua belonged to an aristocratic family with Roman citizenship, as indicated by her name Vibia Perpetua. Perpetua's execution alongside slaves demonstrated Christianity's ability to transcend social distinctions, in contrast to the inequality that pervaded Roman religion and society. As Perpetua and Felicity were equal in martyrdom despite differences in class, they made the dramatic statement that Christianity transcended social structure.

== Evidence for Montanism in the text ==
Some scholars believe that The Passion of Saints Perpetua and Felicity present a Montanist theology. Montanism was a doctrine of early Christianity that arose in Phrygia, modern Turkey. The movement was founded by Montanus; a recent convert to Christianity, said by early church father Saint Jerome to have been previously a priest of Cybele, who had shared his ideas with followers. The group emphasized a belief in the continuing presence of the Holy Spirit visible in the prophetic words of Christians.

Perpetua and Saturus had received new dreams and prophesies within the text in accordance with the beliefs and tenets of Montanism. Further evidence for Montanism is that Perpetua and Felicity may have separated themselves from their partners in accordance with Montanist teachings, which allowed and sometimes even encouraged women to leave non-Christian husbands in favor of celibate lives devoted to preaching the Gospel. However, nothing in the text is explicitly Montanist. Opponents of the new prophecy accused its members of having avoided martyrdom, which makes the identification of the Passion text as Montanist less likely.

The editor's additions may be an attempt to validate Montanist beliefs, praising prophecy and visionary gifts from the Spirit. In the introduction for example, the editor includes a biblical reference to the sons and daughters who shall prophesy in the last days (i). The editor also asserts the importance of acknowledging and honoring both "new prophecies" and "new visions" (i).

Timothy David Barnes, in his Tertullian: An Historical and Literal Study (1973, Oxford University Press), initially defended the Montanist tone of the "Passion" as well as of the martyrs themselves. In his second edition (1982), he retracted this opinion, concluding that "[t]he attempt to show that the martyrs, as well as the 'Passion,' are Montanist must be pronounced unconvincing." Every single one of the purported "Montanist" features of the "Passion" were (and remain today) utterly compatible with orthodox Catholicism.

== Controversy over Dinocrates ==
The account of Saint Perpetua comforting her dead brother has been a point of controversy. The text may imply that the pagan child had not been baptized. Augustine addresses his treatise On the soul and its origin to a certain monk Renatus who used this account to bolster his claim that unbaptized infants could attain paradise, if not the kingdom of heaven. Augustine in turn proposed an explanation for how Dinocrates could have been baptized but later estranged from Christ by his pagan father.

== In popular culture ==
The once-flowering rambling rose "Félicité et Perpétue" (R. sempervirens x 'Old Blush') with palest pinks buds opening nearly white, was introduced by Robert Jacques in 1828.

A new translation by Walter H. Shewring in 1929 of The Passion of Perpetua and Felicity was printed in a new typeface by Eric Gill given the name Perpetua.

Three historical fiction novels have been written from the point of view of Perpetua. The first was The Martyrs of Carthage: a tale of the times of old, which was published in 1868 by Annie Webb-Peploe (writing as Mrs J.B. Webb). Another is Amy Peterson's Perpetua: A Bride, A Martyr, A Passion (ISBN 978-0972927642), published 2004. The third is Malcolm Lyon's The Bronze Ladder (ISBN 978-1905237517), published 2006.

National Geographic documentary entitled Jesus Rise to Power featured the story of Perpetua in its 2nd episode (Martyrs) which was aired in 2013.

BBC's documentary series and book Andrew Marr's History of the World recreates the death of Perpetua in Episode 3.

Catholic Heroes of the Faith: The Story of Saint Perpetua is a short animated movie that was released in 2009.

== See also ==
- Acts of Carpus, Papylus, and Agathonice
- Martyrdom of Polycarp
- List of Christian women of the patristic age

== Sources ==
- Calendarium Romanum. Libreria Editrice Vaticana. 1969.
- Farina, William (2009). Perpetua of Carthage: Portrait of a Third-Century Martyr. Jefferson, NC: McFarland & Company, Inc.
- Kraemer, Ross; Lander, Shira (2000). "Perpetua and Felicitas". In Esler, Philip (ed.). The Early Christian World. Vol. 2. New York: Routledge.
- Salisbury, Joyce (1997). Perpetua's Passion: The Death and Memory of a Young Roman Woman. New York: Routledge.
- Schiavo, Anthony P. (2018). I Am A Christian: Authentic Accounts of Christian Martyrdom and Persecution from the Ancient Sources. Merchantville, NJ: Arx Publishing. ISBN 978-1-935228-18-9. [Includes the complete English translation of the ancient Passion of Perpetua and Felicitas]
- Heffernan, Thomas J. (2012). The Passion of Perpetua and Felicity. Oxford University Press.. 557 pp. A new critical edition of the Latin text with a printing of the Greek text and an extensive historical and philological commentary. The only edition which provides a detailed account of all the extant manuscripts.
- Shaw, Brent D. (1993). "The Passion of Perpetua". Past & Present (139): 3–45. doi:10.1093/past/139.1.3. JSTOR 651089.

== Bibliography ==
=== Books and articles ===
- Butler, Rex: The New Prophecy and "New Visions": Evidence of Montanism in the Passion of Saints Perpetua and Felicitas: Washington DC: Catholic University of America Press: 2006: ISBN 0-8132-1455-6
- Donato, Mia; Engargiola, Carolyn; Gendreau-Distler, Eli; Hasapis, Elizabeth; Hendrickson, Thomas G.; Nguyen, Jacob; Pant, Siddharth; Podila, Shamika; Riordan, Anna; Thompson, Oliver, eds. (2021). The Passion of Perpetua: A Latin Text of the Passio Sanctarum Perpetuae et Felicitatis with Running Vocabulary and Commentary. Pixelia Publishing. Available as a free PDF download.
- Dronke, Peter. Women Writers of the Middle Ages. Cambridge, 1984.
- Peter Habermehl: Perpetua und der Ägypter oder Bilder des Bösen im frühen afrikanischen Christentum. Ein Versuch zur Passio Sanctarum Perpetuae et Felicitatis. 2. überarbeitete Auflage. De Gruyter, Berlin/New York 2004.
- Kitzler, Petr. From ‘Passio Perpetuae’ to ‘Acta Perpetuae’ Recontextualizing a Martyr Story in the Literature of the Early Church: Berlin: de Gruyter: 2015: ISBN 978-3-11-041867-5
- Logan, Barbara Ellen (2002). The Askesis of Abjection: The Ethics of Everyday Suffering in Early Christian Martyrdoms (Doctoral dissertation, University of California, Santa Cruz).
- Maitland, Sara (introduction): The Martyrdom of Perpetua: Evesham: Arthur James: 1996: ISBN 0-85305-352-9
- Moss, Candida, The Myth of Persecution, New York: HarperCollins, 2013.
- Nolan, Edward: Cry Out and Write: A Feminine Poetics of Revelation: New York: Continuum: 1994: ISBN 0-8264-0684-X
- Robeck, Cecil: Prophecy in Carthage: Perpetua, Tertullian and Cyprian: Cleveland: Pilgrim Press: 1992: ISBN 0-8298-0924-4
- Ronsse, Erin Ann: Rhetoric of martyrs: Transmission and reception history of the "Passion of Saints Perpetua and Felicitas". Ph.D. diss., University of Victoria (Canada), 2008, 438 pages; AAT NR40485
- von Franz, Marie-Louise: The Passion of Perpetua: A Psychological Interpretation of Her Visions: Toronto: Inner City Books: 2004: ISBN 1-894574-11-7

=== Videography ===
- Perpetua: Early Church Martyr (2009) – documentary.
- Torchlighters: The Perpetua Story (2009) – animated DVD for children ages 8–12.
- Lost Legacy Reclaimed, Season 1: Episode 3. Perpetua (2019) - documentary.
