= Ludlow Racecourse =

Horse racing venue in Ludlow, England

Coordinates: 52.394°N 2.749°W

Ludlow
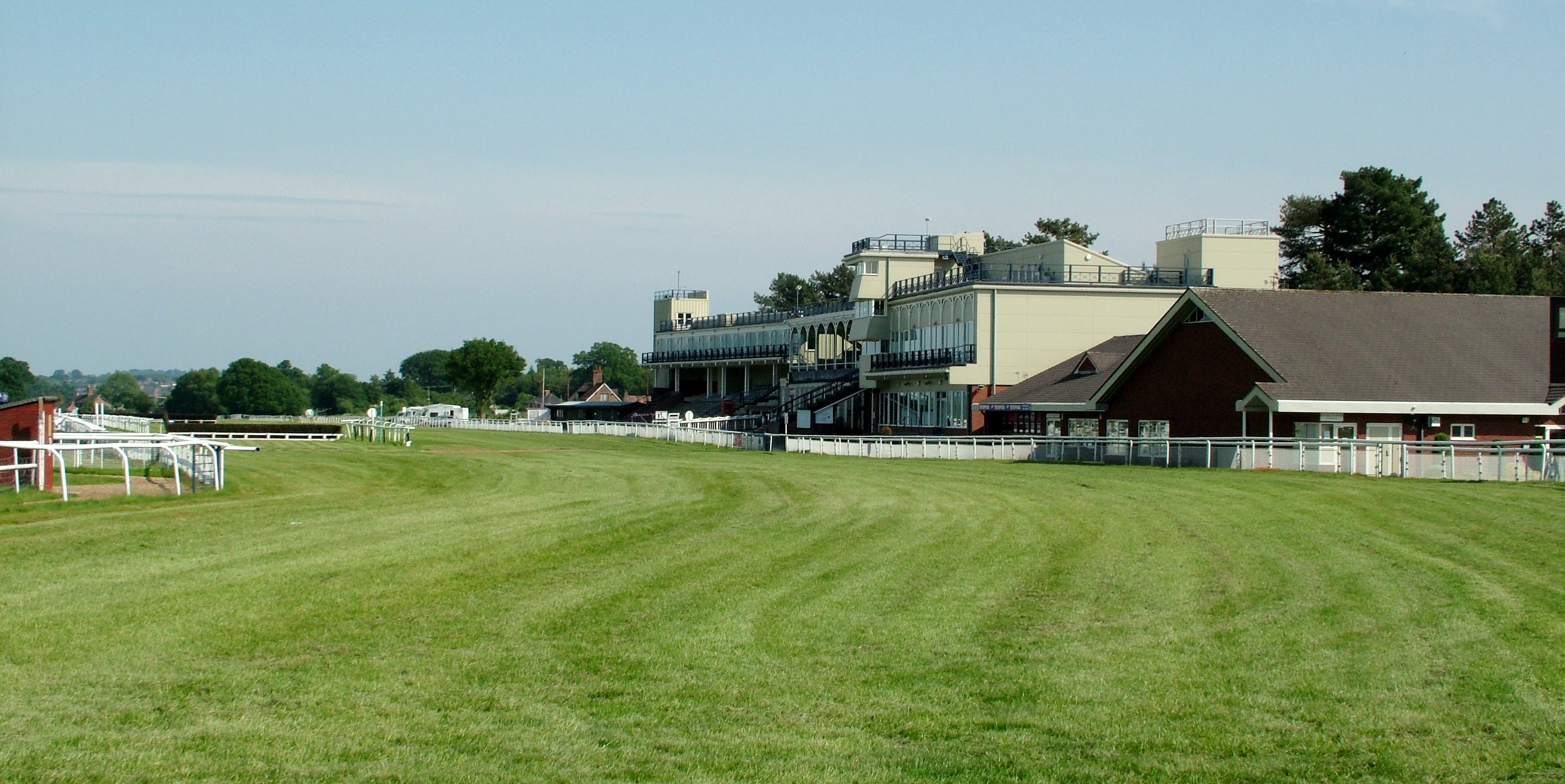
- The stands and home straight, with the water jump on the left
- Interactive map of Ludlow
- Location: Ludlow, Shropshire
- Owned by: Ludlow Race Club Ltd.
- Date opened: 1729
- Screened on: Racing TV
- Course type: National Hunt

Ludlow Racecourse is a thoroughbred horse racing venue located in Bromfield near Ludlow, Shropshire, England.

== History ==
It is said that racing on the Old Field (where the racecourse is sited today) was observed by officers garrisoned at Ludlow Castle in the 14th century, although records of organised racing go back to 1729. Racing continued in the late 18th century, however cockfighting was often the main event which could delay racing by several hours.

National Hunt racing, the only code at Ludlow today, wasn't held at the site until the 1850s, with the course having previously been exclusively for flat racing. Flat racing ceased in 1868. The current Edwardian grandstand was built in 1904.

King Charles III, then The Prince of Wales, rode at Ludlow in October 1980. Riding his own horse Alibar he finished second in an amateur riders' handicap chase.

The course has for decades been known for having issues with firm ground and these led to the cancellation of the entirety of Ludlow's 2026-27 season, with the grass having died in places due to an exceptional drought that summer.

== Course characteristics ==
The hurdles course is just over one and a half miles round with six hurdles per circuit.

The steeplechase course is a shorter circuit of just over one mile and three furlongs. There are nine fences per circuit with six plain fences, two open ditches and a water jump which is situated in front of the stands.

The B4365 crosses the racecourse at three points of the tracks and traffic is stopped when the course is in use. Other minor local roads also cross the track close to the racecourse stables and the Golf Club House.

The venue is located between the small villages of Bromfield and Stanton Lacy, just off the A49.

15 meetings are staged each year at the course running between early October and mid May.

== Golf course ==
The area within the racing tracks is entirely occupied by the Ludlow Golf Club, one of the oldest golf clubs and courses in Shropshire, having been founded in 1889. The course was extensively remodelled by James Braid in 1922. The 18-hole course is 6,277 yards long and is a par 70 from the men's championship tees, and a 5534, par 71 from the ladies tees.

== Bibliography ==
- Gill, James (1975). Racecourses of Great Britain. London: Barrie & Jenkins. ISBN 0-2142-0090-6.
