= John Darcy, 1st Baron Darcy de Knayth =

English peer

John D'arcy
- Baron D'arcy de Knayth
- Tenure: 1332—1347
- Born: 1290; Knaith, Lincolnshire
- Died: 30 May 1347 (aged 56–57)
- Buried: Gisborough Priory
- Spouses: Emmeline Heron; Joan de Burgh
- Issue: John D'arcy, 2nd Baron D'arcy de Knayth; Elizabeth Butler, Countess of Ormond
- Parents: Roger Darcy; Isabel d'Aton

John D'arcy, 1st Baron D'arcy de Knayth (c. 1290 – 30 May 1347) was an English peer. He was created 1st Baron Darcy in 1317.

The son of Roger D'arcy and Isabel de Aton, he was born c. 1280, possibly at Knaith, Lincolnshire. Darcy became one of the most trusted advisors to Edward III of England and was appointed High Sheriff of Nottinghamshire, Derbyshire and the Royal Forests in 1319, High Sheriff of Lancashire in 1323 and High Sheriff of Yorkshire in 1327. He served as Member of Parliament for Nottinghamshire in 1320. He was summoned to Parliament in 1331, 1333 and 1341 as "Johanni Darcy le Cosin".

In 1323 (until 1326), 1332 (until 1333) and again in 1340 (until 1344) he was chief governor of Ireland. In 1324, he presided at the trial of Alice Kyteler, the celebrated Witch of Kilkenny and her associates, and condemned several of them to death by burning. Alice herself, helped by her influential friends, escaped from prison and fled the country.

Darcy was named a Knight Bachelor in 1336.

He was steward to the king (1337–1340) and then chamberlain (1342–1346). An ambitious programme to reform the Irish administration produced little result, possibly because it was delegated to his Deputy, John Morice, a long-serving and conscientious but not very competent civil servant.

In 1342, he joined the Earl of Northampton on an expedition to Flanders and on his return was made Constable of Nottingham Castle (1343–1344) and of the Tower of London (1345–1346). He took part in a number of wars against the Scots and French and fought at the Battle of Crecy in 1346, being sent home by the king to announce the victory in Parliament. He was created the first Lord Darcy of Knayth in 1332.

== Marriage and issue ==
Darcy married twice. He had one son, John, with his first wife, Emmeline. She was the daughter of Sir Walter Heron of Silkston and Alice de Hastings. Darcy's second wife was Joan, widow of Thomas FitzJohn, 2nd Earl of Kildare. Her parents were Richard Óg de Burgh, 2nd Earl of Ulster and his wife and cousin Margaret de Burgh. Darcy and Joan de Burgh had a daughter, Elizabeth, who married James Butler, 2nd Earl of Ormonde.

== Death ==
After Darcy died in 1347, his son John succeeded to the barony. Darcy was buried at Gisborough Priory.

Peerage of England
New title	Baron Darcy de Knayth; 1332–1347	Succeeded by John Darcy
