= Robert Foulkes =

Church of England cleric

Robert Foulkes (baptised 19 March 1633/34 – executed 31 January 1678/79) was a Welsh-born English Church of England cleric and murderer.

== Early life ==
Although long presumed to have been a native of Shropshire in England, Foulkes was born and baptised at Mallwyd, Wales, son of namesake Robert Foulkes and is known to have had an older brother, John, with whom he attended Shrewsbury School in 1648–49.

== Priesthood ==
Foulkes, according to Anthony à Wood, "became a servitor of Christ Church, Oxford, in Michaelmas term 1651, where he continued more than four years, under the tuition and government of Presbyterians and independents. Afterwards entering into the sacred function he became a preacher, and at length vicar of Stanton Lacy in his own county of Shropshire, and took to him a wife."

Three years before his induction as vicar at Stanton Lacy on 12 September 1660, Foulkes married on 7 September 1657 at Ludlow parish church, Isabella, daughter of Thomas Colbatch (died 1637), a deceased former rector of the same parish. The couple had four children, born between 1665 and 1673.

Isabella had been brought up in the home of Stanton Lacy's previous vicar, Thomas Atkinson (died 1657). Among other children, Atkinson left a daughter, Ann (born about 1650), with whom Foulkes began a relationship rumoured to be going on as early as 1669. Foulkes, who had been a zealous preacher in the early years of his incumbency, was reportedly seen publicly misbehaving with Ann and became a heavy drinker at local alehouses.

There was speculation when Ann was sent away from the parish to give birth at West Felton to an illegitimate baby girl, born in or about May 1674, held to have been sent for fostering by a wet-nurse elsewhere; the child's paternity was never firmly proved but was allegedly Foulkes's.

In the summer of 1676, Foulkes was admonished by the Bishop of Hereford, Herbert Croft, after complaints about the relationship and other misbehaviour were brought before a consistory court in Ludlow, and he also reportedly beat his wife and a churchwarden who tried to intervene at his rectory house on the same night, after drinking at a bowling match.

== Murder and conviction ==
He seduced the young lady who resided with him, took a lodging for her in York Buildings in the Strand, and there made away with the child that was born on 11 December 1678, by stabbing it in the throat with a knife and disposing of the body down a privy emptying into the River Thames. Contrary to popular assertion, given in two contemporary pamphlets, the child was not strangled by him. The next morning, he returned to Shropshire. When the body was found "by a Strange Providence", Atkinson eventually made a full confession.

Foulkes was tried and convicted at the Old Bailey sessions, 16 January 1678–9. After receiving sentence he manifested great penitence, and was visited by several eminent divines, among whom was Gilbert Burnet. William Lloyd, dean of Bangor, who came to him the very evening after his condemnation, managed to obtain for him, through Compton, Bishop of London, a few days' reprieve, which he employed in writing forty pages of cant, entitled "An Alarme for Sinners: containing the Confession, Prayers, Letters, and Last Words of Robert Foulkes, … with an Account of his Life. Published from the Original, Written with his own hand, … and sent by him at his Death to Doctor Lloyd", quarto, London 1679. He speaks of his unfortunate companion with ill-concealed malignity. On the morning of 31 January 1678–9 he was executed at Tyburn, "not with other common felons, but by himself", and was buried by night at St. Giles-in-the-Fields.
