= Tilty Abbey =

Former monastery in Essex, England

- Abbey of St Mary, Tilty
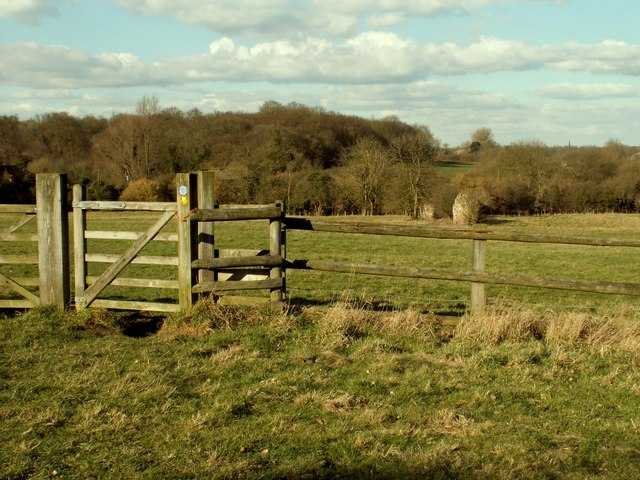
- Remains of Tilty Abbey
- Interactive map of Tilty Abbey

Monastery information
- Order: Cistercian
- Established: 1153
- Disestablished: 1536
- Mother house: Warden Abbey
- Dedication: Blessed Virgin Mary

People
- Founder: Maurice FitzGeoffrey

Site
- Location: Tilty, Essex, England
- Coordinates: 51.9150°N 0.3258°E
- Visible remains: Parish church (former gatehouse chapel) and some wall fragments

Tilty Abbey was a Cistercian abbey in Tilty, Essex, England. It was dissolved 3 March 1536. The chapel, with a nave built circa 1220, became a parish church and has survived, with later alterations and extensions.

An order taken at the late monastery of Tiltey, 3 March 27 Hen. VIII., with John Palmer, late abbot of the same. First, the late abbot and his 5 brethren to remain in the abbey till the King's further pleasure. 11 other items regulating the management of the house by the abbot, who is to retain his 5 servants, named, and continue to support Alice Mills, his mother, Agnes Lucas, widow, and Thomas Ewen, impotent persons. For the finding of which the said Richard Crumwell has delivered to the said John Palmer, at the making of this, 60s., &c. Indenture signed by John Palmer, late abbot. 2. Inventory indented of goods and chattels belonging to the late monastery of Tiltey, made 3 March 27 Hen. VIII. In the vestry:—2 altar cloths of white Bruges satin, with spots like drops of blood, of red velvet; "a vestment, deacon and subdeacon; a cope of Turkey red satin and white lawnd, wrought with gold, with a deacon and subdeacon to the same"; 29 pieces of vestments; vestments of white damask, green velvet, and green bāwdkyn; a cope of blue damask, and three of silk, branched and wrought with beasts of gold, and 9 other copes and vestments mostly with "deacon and subdeacon"; altar cloths and towels of diaper; and 4 chests, two bound with iron. In the convent parlour:—2 tables, 4 trestles, 1 turned chair, 2 painted cloths, 2 pieces of old saye, 2 forms of planks. In the buttery:—6 basins of laten, 6 candlesticks, 3 of them "bellyd," 3 salts of pewter. In the cellar:—A little chest, 2 "joists covered with lead to lay on barrels of beer." In the kitchen:—2 brass pots, kettles, &c., 16 platters of old fashioned pewter, &c., a flesh hook and beam of iron and weights of lead of ½ cwt., 1 qr., 21 lbs., 1 stone, ½ stone, 2 lbs., and 1 lb. In the abbot's dining chamber:—Hangings of red say, "a carpet of gaunt work for the table"; carpets for a cupboard and counter, a pair of tongs and a fire fork, &c. In the abbot's bedchamber:— A cross and a censer of silver and gilt, a ship with a spoon, a sait with cover, 3 maser bonds and 10 spoons of silver, which plate, except 6 silver spoons remaining with the late abbot, is delivered to Mr. Richard Cromwell; a feather bed and hangings &c. In the guest chamber:—Hangings of painted cloth, a trussing bed, &c. Servants' chamber:— A feather bed, bolster, and an old coverlet. Brew-house:—3 brass pots hanging in a furnace and 3 brewing vats. Church:—12 candlesticks and 2 great standards of laten, a pair of organs. Larder:—46 couple of salt fishes, 12 couple of lings, and 31 couple of stock fishes. In witness whereof "the said" Richard Cromwell and John Milsont have signed the part of this indenture remaining with the said late abbot, while he has signed the part remaining with them. Signed by John Palmer, late abbot. Pp. 3. Endd.: Order taken with the abbot of Tiltey, 3 March.
