= Blackmore Priory =

Priory in Essex, England

Coordinates: 51.690355°N 0.317834°E

Blackmore Priory was a priory in Essex, England. It was established as an Augustinian Priory with a Prior and twelve Canons, who were not monks but ordained priests. They would be expected to work in the parish as well as lead a monastic life in the Priory.

The buildings were begun in the second half of the 12th century. Some of the original architecture can still be seen in what is now the Parish Church of St Laurence, notably the door between the [later] bell tower and the nave, which was once the main entrance. The Priory's heyday was around the end of the fourteenth century when a single roof was placed over the nave and aisles. The timber bell tower dates from 1400.

Henry VIII was a frequent visitor to Jericho House, so must have known the Priory well. But in the 1520s, Henry, with Cardinal Wolsey, was responsible for the demise of the monastery, which eventually passed into secular hands and was largely demolished.

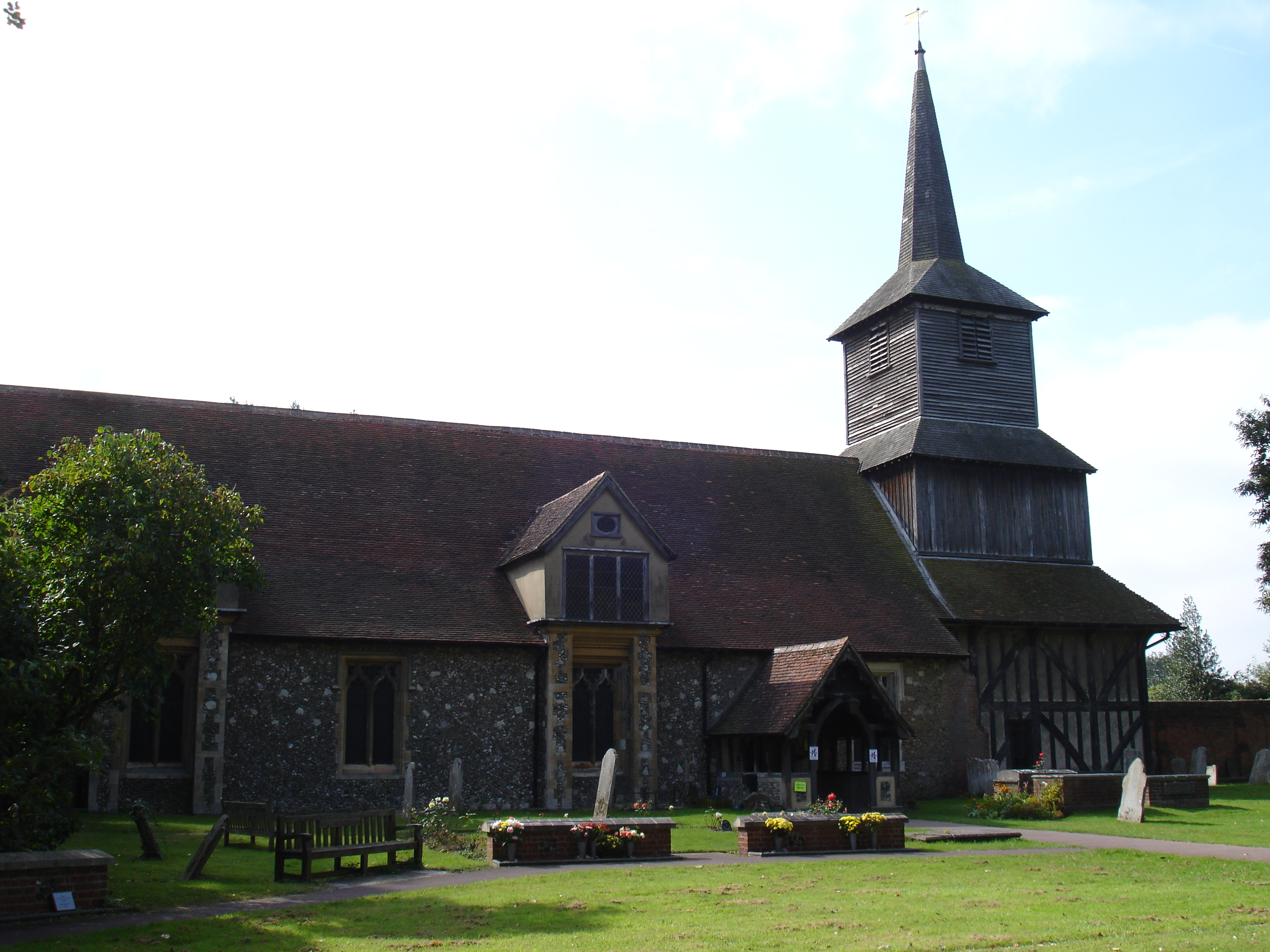
Blackmore Priory church
