= Freiston =

Village and civil parish in Lincolnshire, England

Coordinates: 52°58′34.99″N 0°2′44.09″E

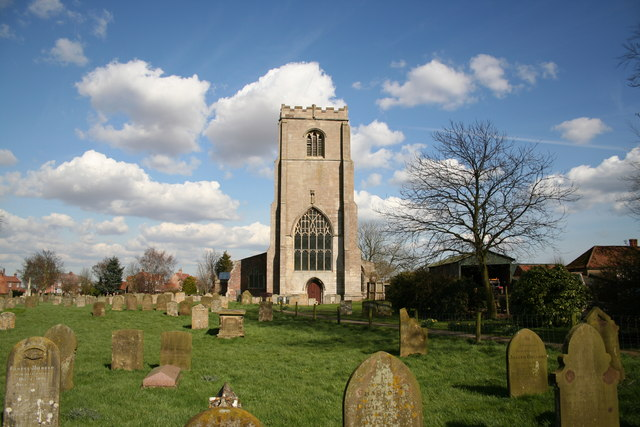
- St James' Church, Freiston

- Location within Lincolnshire
- Population: 1,306 (2011)
- OS grid reference: TF374440
  - London: 100 mi (160 km) S
- District: Boston (borough)
- Shire county: Lincolnshire
- Region: East Midlands
- Country: England
- Sovereign state: United Kingdom
- Post town: Boston
- Postcode district: PE22
- Police: Lincolnshire
- Fire: Lincolnshire
- Ambulance: East Midlands
- UK Parliament: Boston and Skegness

Freiston is a village and civil parish in Lincolnshire, England. The population of the civil parish (including Freiston Shore) at the 2011 census was 1,306. It is situated approximately 2 miles (3 km) east from Boston. The Greenwich Prime Zero meridian line passes between the village and Hobhole Drain.

== History ==
In 1114 Freiston Priory of St James was founded by Alan de Creon for Benedictine monks – it became a monastic cell of Crowland Abbey in 1130. Nothing remains of the priory buildings that stood on the south side of the present church, except for a Norman doorway in the south aisle that opened into the cloisters.

Between 1217 and 1232 the powerful Ranulf de Blondeville, 6th Earl of Chester signed an agreement with the 56 free tenants of Freiston, who quite remarkably all had seals on the document. The number of seals could also suggest remarkably high literacy rates which were not previously thought to have existed in the 13th century. From what is known about the composition of medieval settlements and households there would have been between 4-6 people on average for each of these households giving a minimum population of 224–336, this not taking into the account the possibility of serfs and other peasants who were not included in the signing of the document meaning the population could have been above 500.

Until 1974 the parish formed part of Boston Rural District, in the Parts of Holland. Holland was one of the three divisions (formally known as parts) of the traditional county of Lincolnshire. Since the Local Government Act 1888, Holland had been in most respects, a county in itself. Before this, Freiston had been in Skirbeck Wapentake, Parts of Holland.

== Community ==
Freiston is one of 18 civil parishes which, together with Boston, form the Borough of Boston local government arrangement, in place since a reorganisation of 1 April 1974 which resulted from the Local Government Act 1972. The parish forms part of the Coastal electoral ward.

The settlements of Haltoft End, 1 mile (1.6 km) north-north-west, and Scrane End (or Crane End), 1 mile (1.6 km) south from Freiston, lie within the parish On its eastern side, Freiston parish adjoins The Wash.

Freiston is the location of HM Prison North Sea Camp, a men's open prison.

== St James' church ==
Freiston Grade I listed Anglican parish church is dedicated to St James. The church was originally cruciform with a central tower. The existing tower is of Perpendicular style, and the parts of the nave are Early English. The roof and chancel were restored in 1763, and the whole building in 1871. An earlier rood screen was sold to the church at Fishtoft.
