= Annie Webb =

Annie Webb-Peploe (also known as Annie Webb) (1806–1880) was a British writer of approximately 25 books, some under the name "Mrs. J.B. Webb".

Webb was born Annie Molyneux on 4 February 1806 in Stanton Lacy, Shropshire, England. She married John Birch Webb, the vicar of Weobley in Herefordshire in 1828. In 1866 the family changed its name to Webb-Peploe, appending John's mother's maiden name. The couple had three sons, Daniel (1829–1887), who joined the army, Augustus (1834–1886), who joined the Royal Navy, and Hammer (or Hanmer) (b.1835) who became an Evangelical clergyman and author of books on religious topics, and four daughters, Charlotte Anne (1831–1841), Gertrude Elizabeth (1833–1901), Eleanora Maria (b.1837), and Ella Mary Ann (b.1844).

Webb-Peploe died on 13 January 1880 in South Kensington, London.

Her best-known book today is probably Naomi: or, The last days of Jerusalem (1841), which was reprinted throughout the nineteenth century.
