= Heynings Priory =

Former Cistercian priory in Lincolnshire, England

Coordinates: 53.3575°N 0.72963°W

Heynings Priory was a priory in Knaith, Lincolnshire, England.

The priory of Heynings was founded by Rayner de Evermue, Lord of Knaith, for Cistercian nuns, probably early in the reign of King Stephen, and the patronage of the house remained with the lords of Knaith through most of its history. Rayner de Evermue died before its completion, leaving them with a meagre endowment which left them extremely poor.

The priory was dissolved in 1539 by Jane Sanford, Prioress, and eleven nuns.

The site was granted to Sir Thomas Heneage and his wife Katherine and at his death in 1553 passed by marriage to Lord Willoughby of Parham, along with the manor of Knaith. Heneage's grant in 1540 was 'the house and site of the late priory...the church, steeple and churchyard of the same'.

The actual site is unknown but is believed to be at the site of Park Farm South.

== Burials ==
- Philip Darcy, 4th Baron Darcy de Knayth (1341–1398)
