= Freiston Priory =

Benedictine priory in Lincolnshire, England

Coordinates: 52.9739°N 0.0506°E

Freiston Priory was a Benedictine cell of Crowland Abbey founded in 1114, and became a priory soon afterwards. It was Dissolved in 1539 and was located in Freiston, Lincolnshire, England.

The priory was probably founded soon after the year 1114, as it was in that year that Alan de Creoun presented to Crowland Abbey the church of Freiston, and later on, according to Peter of Blois, placed there a prior and monks. A few years after the monastery was built he increased the endowment by further gifts.
