= Tilty =

Village in Essex, England

Coordinates: 51.9131°N 0.325280°E

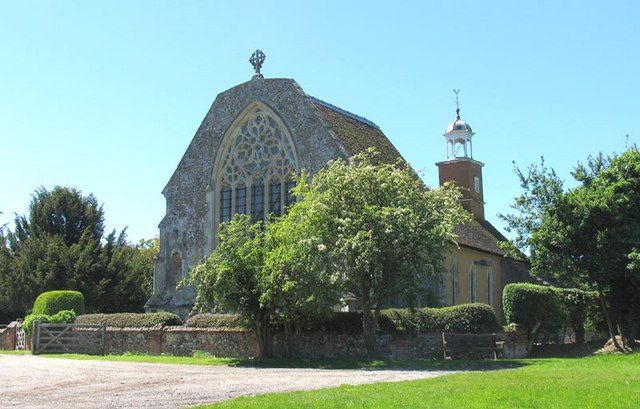
- Church of St Mary the Virgin

- Location within Essex
- Population: 102 (Parish, 2021)
- OS grid reference: TL600264
  - London: 35 mi (56 km) SE
- Civil parish: Tilty
- District: Uttlesford
- Shire county: Essex
- Region: East
- Country: England
- Sovereign state: United Kingdom
- Post town: DUNMOW
- Postcode district: CM6
- Dialling code: 01279
- Police: Essex
- Fire: Essex
- Ambulance: East of England
- UK Parliament: Saffron Walden

Tilty is a village and civil parish in the Uttlesford district of Essex, England. It lies 3 miles (5 km) north-west of Dunmow, its post town. At the 2021 census the parish had a population of 102.

Tilty was recorded in the Domesday Book as Tileteia. It was historically also known as Tylsey.

Tilty's parish church is dedicated to St Mary the Virgin, and is Grade I listed. The building is the surviving chapel from the monastery of Tilty Abbey, which was dissolved in the 1530s; the nave was built circa 1220.

Another listed building is the derelict Grade II* Tilty Mill, which dates from the early 18th century.

== See also ==
- The Hundred Parishes
