= St Laurence's Church, Blackmore =

Church of St Laurence, Blackmore
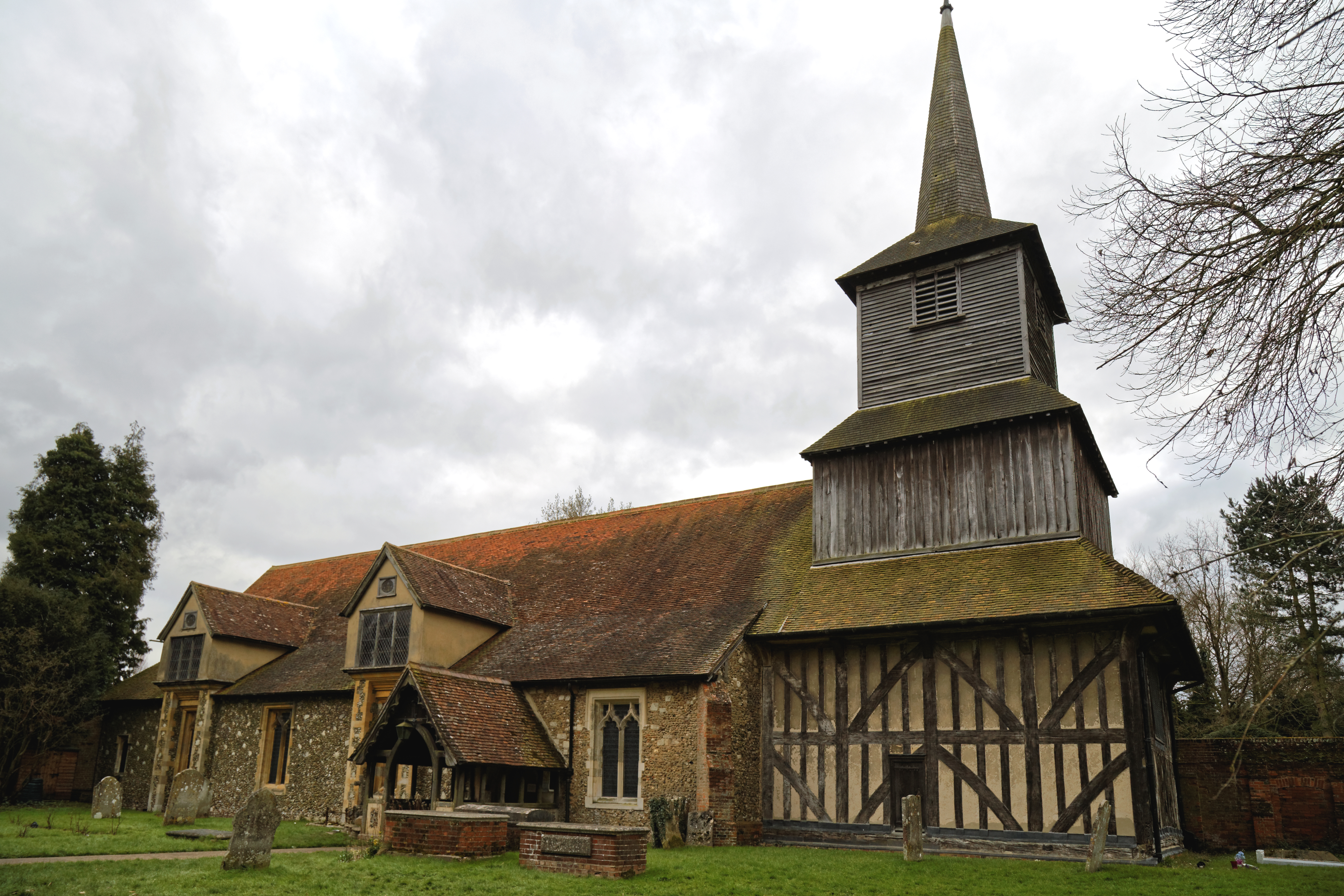
- Church of St Laurence, Blackmore
- 51°41′25″N 0°19′4″E
- OS grid reference: TL 603 016
- Location: Blackmore, Essex
- Country: England
- Denomination: Church of England
- Website: St Laurence, Blackmore

Architecture
- Heritage designation: Grade I
- Designated: 20 February 1967

Administration
- Diocese: Diocese of Chelmsford
- Deanery: Epping Forest and Ongar

St Laurence's Church is an Anglican church, in the village of Blackmore, Essex, England. It is a former priory church, and is noted for its wooden bell tower. It is a Grade I listed building.

== The priory ==
Richard, Bishop of London from 1155 to 1162, gave authority for the foundation of Blackmore Priory, and the earliest parts of the building are of the late 12th century.

The priory was dissolved in 1527, as part of Cardinal Wolsey's attempts to reform the church & divert some of its revenues to fund educational foundations. As such, this suppression was to form a model for the later Dissolution of the Monasteries, many smaller monasteries being closed in that year, mostly on the grounds of having insufficient numbers to fulfil their original religious obligations. John Smyth, auditor to the King, bought the site in 1540. The nave is that of the former priory; the building once extended further east, but this part was demolished in the 1540s.

== History of the building ==
It is thought that the priory church originally had a high nave, with lower roofs over the aisles; in the late 14th century, one roof was erected over the nave and aisles. The dormer windows were built in the Tudor period, but it is not known if they predate the truncation of the church.

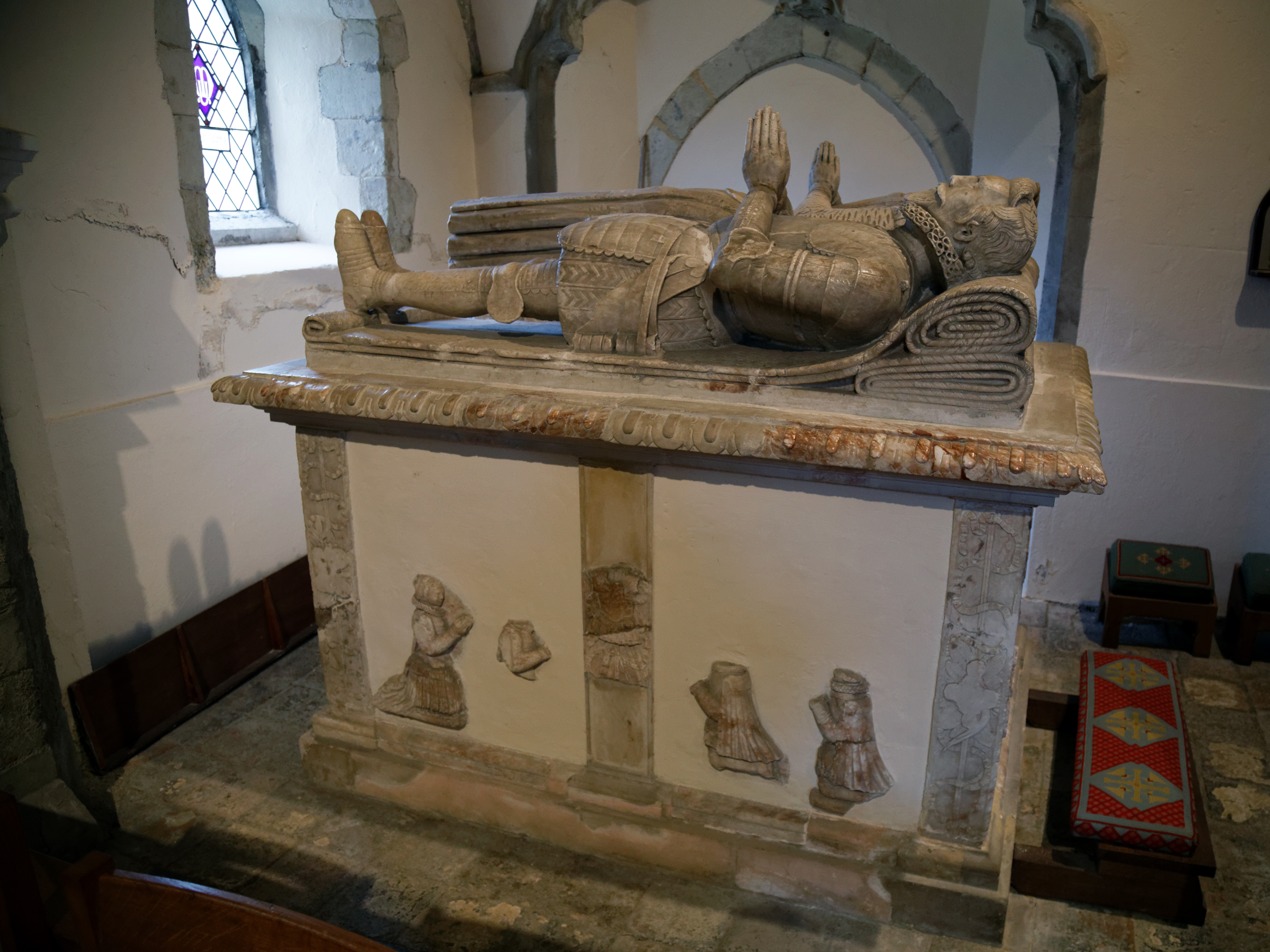
Tomb of Thomas Smyth (died 1594) and his wife Margaret

The Smyth family were important in the village, through to 1721. In the south aisle there is an altar-tomb of Thomas Smyth (died 1594) and his wife Margaret. There are floor slabs in the chancel and nave, of the 17th and 18th centuries, of family members.

From 1600 there have been no structural changes. The north porch is of the 19th century. There was restoration from 1895 to 1905 by Frederick Chancellor: the north arcade was rebuilt, and the east end of the north aisle was rebuilt.

=== The bell tower ===
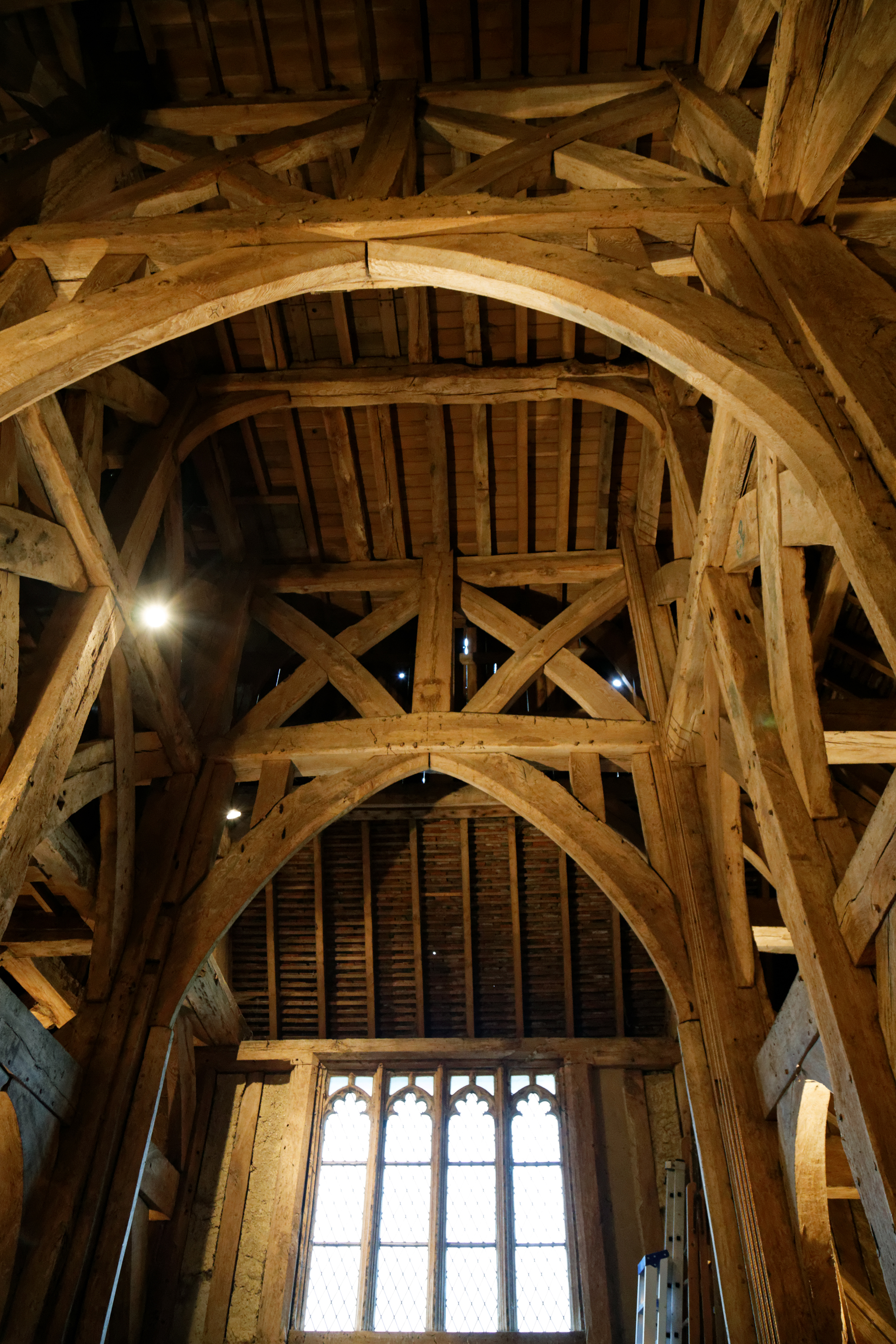
The interior of the bell tower

There are many timber bell towers in this part of Essex. The construction of this tower is similar to that of the church at Margaretting, and it is thought the same architect may have constructed both. Unusually, this tower is in three stages. There are five bells in the tower, two of them cast by Miles Graye, in 1648 and 1657.

In the 1960s Cecil Hewett, by means of radiocarbon dating and with knowledge of medieval carpentry in Essex, dated the bell tower at Blackmore to about 1480.

In 2004 Dr Martin Bridge, of the Oxford Dendrochronology Laboratory, took samples of wood from the tower, so that the age could be determined by dendrochronology. For three of them, the date of felling of the timber was found, the years being from 1397 to 1400. The conclusion was that the tower was built earlier than had been supposed: in 1400 or within the following two years.
