= Knaith =

Village in Lincolnshire, England

Coordinates: 53.3533°N 0.7550°W

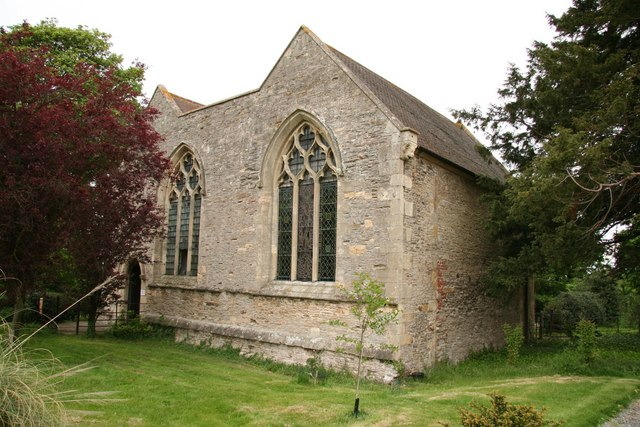
- St Mary's parish church

- Location within Lincolnshire
- Population: 335 (2011 Census)
- OS grid reference: SK829847
  - London: 130 mi (210 km) S
- District: West Lindsey
- Shire county: Lincolnshire
- Region: East Midlands
- Country: England
- Sovereign state: United Kingdom
- Post town: Gainsborough
- Postcode district: DN21
- Dialling code: 01427
- Police: Lincolnshire
- Fire: Lincolnshire
- Ambulance: East Midlands
- UK Parliament: Gainsborough

Knaith is a village and civil parish about 3 miles (5 km) south of the town of Gainsborough in the West Lindsey district of Lincolnshire, England. The population of the civil parish at the 2011 census was 335.

Knaith is a community with roots in Anglo-Saxon England. Knaith is listed as Cheneiðe in the Domesday Book of 1086 with three households, a meadow of 25 acres (10 ha) and 26 acres (11 ha) of woodland, located in the ancient wapentake of Well, in the West Riding of the Parts of Lindsey. Well no longer exists as a named location, but can be identified on the ground. The Lord of Knaith in both 1066 and 1086 was the St Mary's Abbey of Stow, and the Tenant in Chief in 1086 was the Bishop of Lincoln (St Mary).

There are earthwork remains of Knaith medieval village. These include a medieval deer park created in the early 13th century, which became a possession of John Darcy, 1st Baron Darcy de Knayth, and his heirs. South of Knaith Hall are garden remains from the 16th or 17th century, and the remains of an 18th-century deer park.

Knaith Hall is a red-brick 15th-century building with some timber framing and is now Grade II listed.

The Church of England parish church of St Mary is 11th century, with alterations from the 14th and 18th, and an 1894 restoration. It is a Grade II* listed building. St Mary's might be the transept or nave of the church of Heynings Priory, a Cistercian nunnery founded probably around 1150.
