= Bromfield, Shropshire =

Village in Shropshire, England

Coordinates: 52.388°N 2.765°W

Bromfield
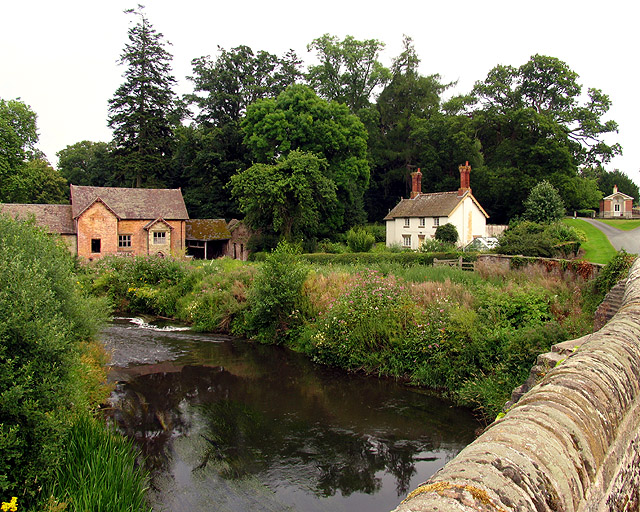
- The River Teme at Bromfield, Shropshire

- Location within Shropshire
- Population: 277 (2011)
- OS grid reference: SO479769
- Civil parish: Bromfield
- Unitary authority: Shropshire
- Ceremonial county: Shropshire
- Region: West Midlands
- Country: England
- Sovereign state: United Kingdom
- Post town: LUDLOW
- Postcode district: SY8
- Dialling code: 01584
- Police: West Mercia
- Fire: Shropshire
- Ambulance: West Midlands
- UK Parliament: Ludlow

Bromfield is a village and civil parish in Shropshire, England.

According to the 2001 census it had a population of 306, which had fallen to 277 at the 2011 census.

== Location ==
Bromfield is located near the market town of Ludlow, two miles (3 km) northwest of the town centre, on the A49 road. The A4113 road (to Knighton) has its eastern end in Bromfield, at its junction with the A49.

The village is situated near the confluence of the River Teme and River Onny. The latter splits the village into two, with the church and many of the older buildings to the west and the recently redeveloped business area to the east (towards Ludlow). A bridge takes the main road over the river.

== History ==
The manor of Bromfield, and separately Bromfield Priory, are recorded in the Domesday Book of 1086, then still falling within the Saxon hundred of Culvestan, which was abolished in the reign of Henry I; Bromfield then came within Munslow hundred. It was a large and well-populated manor. The parish at that time extended beyond the present-day boundaries, to the north (with a detached part at Halford existing into the 19th century) and the south (another detached part, near Ashford Bowdler).

In 1884 it expanded significantly by taking in a large part of the southern portion of Stanton Lacy's parish; in 1934 another significant boundary change took place, with a large part (on both sides of the River Teme, and including a small part of the 1884 transfer from Stanton Lacy) transferred to Ludlow. Circa 1967 the borders of Ludford, Bromfield and Ludlow were re-aligned in the Whitcliffe area.

1987 saw a small area, containing the places of Wigley and Fishmore, transferred from East Hamlet which was being dissolved at the time. The effect of the boundary changes caused by this dissolution was the creation of a second boundary with Ludford, with Ludlow now encircled by the two parishes of Ludford and Bromfield.

Much of the parish, as well as the neighbouring parish of Stanton Lacy, is part of the Earl of Plymouth's Oakly Park Estate. Oakly Park is now the Plymouth family seat.

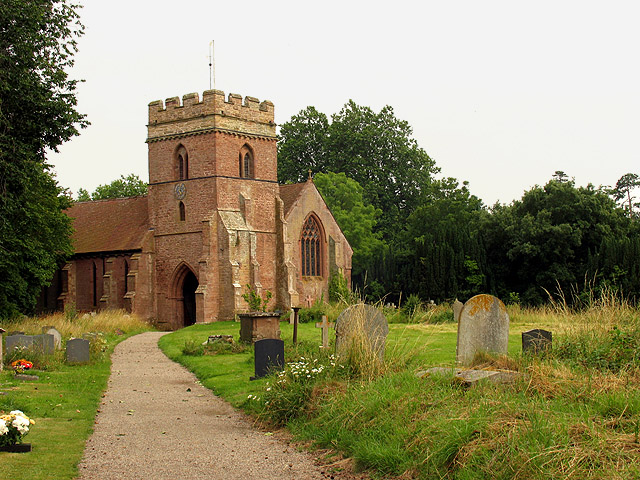
St Mary's parish church.

The village church is dedicated to St. Mary the Virgin and is a grade I listed building. There was, until the Dissolution of the Monasteries, a priory at Bromfield.

== Amenities ==
Three-quarters of Ludlow Racecourse and the Ludlow Golf Club are located in the parish, to the northeast of the village. The Welsh Marches Line passes through the parish, between the village and the racecourse. A level crossing and signal box still exist, but the station itself closed in 1958.

The village contains a post office (open Monday-Friday only), a hotel/restaurant/bar, a large local food centre, a smaller restaurant/cafe, and a garden/plant centre. These are all located adjacent to one another in a recently redeveloped business area by the A49 road.

Islabikes were based in the business area but moved to nearby Ludford; they manufacture specialist bicycles, in particular for children.

National Cycle Network route 44 passes through the village, on its way between Bishop's Castle and Ludlow. It passes under the A49 by a subway, an unusual feature for a village in Shropshire.

== People associated with Bromfield ==
- Henry Hill Hickman, early promoter of anaesthetics

== See also ==
- Listed buildings in Bromfield, Shropshire
