= Stanton Lacy =

Village in Shropshire, England

Coordinates: 52.405°N 2.742°W

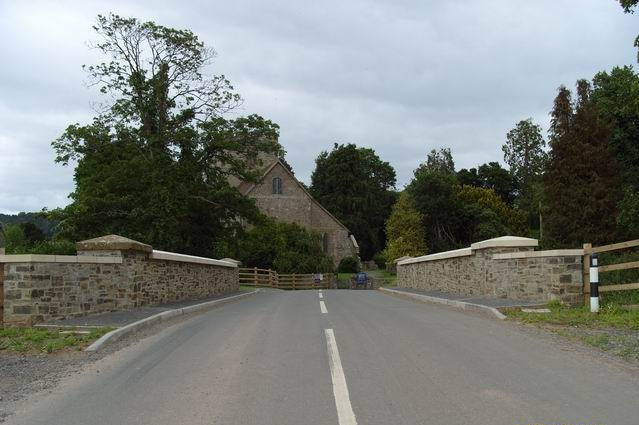
- Stanton Lacy Bridge, crossing the River Corve, and St Peter's Church

- Location within Shropshire
- Population: 345 (2011)
- OS grid reference: SO496788
- Civil parish: Stanton Lacy
- Unitary authority: Shropshire
- Ceremonial county: Shropshire
- Region: West Midlands
- Country: England
- Sovereign state: United Kingdom
- Post town: Ludlow
- Postcode district: SY8
- Dialling code: 01584
- Police: West Mercia
- Fire: Shropshire
- Ambulance: West Midlands
- UK Parliament: Ludlow

Stanton Lacy is a small village and geographically large civil parish located in south Shropshire, England, 3 miles (4.8 km) north of Ludlow.

The River Corve flows through the parish, on its way south towards the River Teme, and passes immediately to the west of the village.

The ancient parish church in the village is St Peter's. The building is Grade I listed and has pre-Norman parts dating to circa 1050.

== Parish ==
The parish covers a wide rural area, encompassing a part of the flat and low-lying Corvedale but also an area of upland around Hayton's Bent (with the highest elevation being 265 metres (869 ft)). It contains a number of small settlements, including:

- Stanton Lacy (the village)
- Vernolds Common
- The Hope
- Lower Hayton
- Upper Hayton
- Hayton's Bent – location of Stanton Lacy Village Hall
- Downton
- Hoptongate

The 2011 census recorded a resident population of 345. The geographic area of the parish is 2,325 hectares (5,750 acres).

The northern part of the Old Field (now occupied by Ludlow Racecourse and the Ludlow Golf Club) is located in the parish, located about a mile (1.6 km) to the south of the village.

Much of the parish, as well as the neighbouring parish of Bromfield, remains part of the Earl of Plymouth's Oakly Park Estate.

== History ==
Stanton Lacy has early Anglo-Saxon origins and can trace its history to before the Norman conquest of 1066, after which the large manor of Stanton was granted to Roger de Lacy. Previously simply known as Stanton, this ownership gave it the name of Stanton Lacy, which is in use to the present day and helps distinguish it from the many other places in England (and Shropshire) with the name 'Stanton'.

The manor features in the Domesday Book of 1086 and this recorded a notably large population of the manor, indeed the greatest in the county measured by number of households, as well as the fourth-greatest monetary value. The Book also recorded the presence of a church and two priests. At the time Stanton came within the Saxon hundred of Culvestan, which was replaced during the reign of Henry I and the parish then came within the new Munslow hundred.

The parish was larger than now, with extensive boundaries as per the original manorial holding, and extended south to the parish of Ludford and the River Teme at Dinham. Ludlow Castle and the town of Ludlow were established within the parish's southern boundaries, by the manor's successive lords/tenants-in-chief, in the late 11th century/early 12th century. Ludlow Castle and an early neighbouring settlement (possibly Dinham) were just about in existence at the time of the Domesday Book survey and therefore may have contributed towards the high population count and taxable value for the manor of Stanton.

The now-separate parish of Hopton Cangeford and the former parish of Cold Weston, merged into Clee St. Margaret in 1967, were once part of Stanton Lacy.

Ludlow (with its church of St Laurence) had become its own parish by 1200, carving out land largely from Stanton Lacy parish (otherwise from Ludford); Ludlow Castle also by this point constituted its own parish (with its chapel of St Mary Magdalene) – a situation that remained until 1901. What remained of Stanton Lacy's southern part was then unaffected until 1884; this southern part (south of the watercourse known as 'Hope Gutter') was entirely removed in that year with its transfer largely to Bromfield, but also Bitterley (land to the east of the Ledwyche Brook) and the new East Hamlet parish. The result of this was the ending of the historic border with Ludford. By 1879 a part in the west of the parish (the township of Wootton) had been removed to Onibury.

=== Decline ===
Whilst the parish used to be able to boast two schools, four Methodist chapels, a post office, pubs and a football team, none of these now remain. The population of the parish has declined greatly since the late 19th century and it now serves as a popular retirement destination with a small farming community remaining too.

== People ==
- Murderer Robert Foulkes served as vicar of Stanton Lacy at the time of his crime, for which he was hanged in 1679.
- Rev. George William St John (4 May 1796 – ?), Rector of Stanton Lacy, married Henrietta Frances Magrath in 1830. A son of Frederick St John (British Army officer) and Lady Diana Beauclerk
- Victorian writer Annie Molyneux, later Mrs Annie Webb and then Annie Webb-Peploe (1806–1880), author of Naomi; or, The last days of Jerusalem (1841), was born in Stanton Lacy in 1806.
- Rev. Hugh Henry Molesworth Bevan (1884–1970), previously Archdeacon of Ludlow, was Rector of Stanton Lacy from 1954 until retiring from full-time ministry in 1966.
- Stanton Lacy Parish (more precisely in Ludlow) was birthplace of World War I Victoria Cross recipient, Able Seaman William Charles Williams in 1880 (killed at Gallipoli 1915).
- Jockey Edward Hide (1937–2023) winner of six classic races including the Derby was born in the village.
- Rugby player Jonny Hill (1994- ) who made his debut for England against Italy in the Six Nations Championship in 2020 hails from Stanton Lacy and went to school in Ludlow.
