= Blackmore =

Village in Essex, England

Coordinates: 51.6894°N 0.3266°E

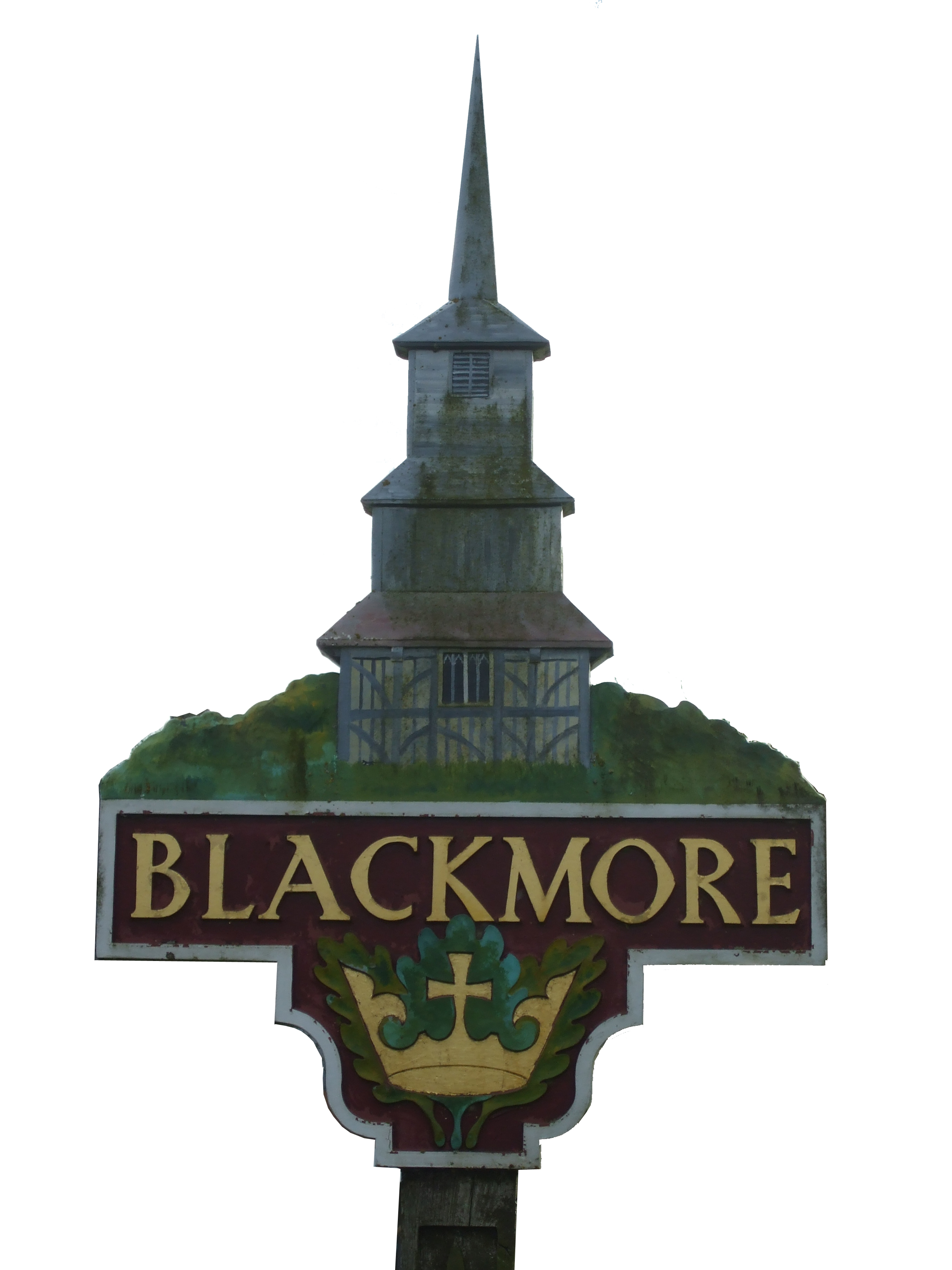
- Village sign

- Location within Essex
- Area: 0.258 km^{2} (0.100 sq mi)
- Population: 826 (2018 estimate)
  - Density: 3,202/km^{2} (8,290/sq mi)
- OS grid reference: TL603016
- Civil parish: Blackmore, Hook End and Wyatts Green
- District: Brentwood
- Shire county: Essex
- Region: East
- Country: England
- Sovereign state: United Kingdom
- Post town: INGATESTONE
- Postcode district: CM4
- Dialling code: 01277
- Police: Essex
- Fire: Essex
- Ambulance: East of England
- UK Parliament: Brentwood & Ongar

Blackmore is a village in Essex, England. It is located approximately 3 miles (5 km) east of Chipping Ongar and 4 miles (7 km) north of Brentwood. The village is in the parish of Blackmore, Hook End and Wyatts Green in the Brentwood district and the parliamentary constituency of Brentwood & Ongar. In 2018 it had an estimated population of 826.

== History ==
It is thought that the name Blackmore was introduced in the Middle Ages as a reference to 'Black Marsh' or 'Black Swamp'.

The origins of the Priory Church of St Laurence date back to 1114 and marks the site of a former Augustinian Priory, dissolved during the reign of Henry VIII in 1525. The church is the original building (but without the chancel, which was destroyed at the time of dissolution) and is now the parish church. It has one of the last remaining all-wooden steeples in England which was added around 1400. The site still shows signs of the original moat. The village itself is believed to have migrated to a location closer to the chapel of the Priory from around Fingrith Hall during the mediaeval period.

Jericho Priory, on the site adjacent to the church and still within the moated area, was built in the 18th century on the site of an earlier 16th-century building which was believed to be the country retreat of Henry VIII and where, in 1520, his 'natural son', Henry Fitzroy, Duke of Richmond, was born.

Other old buildings in the village include the 15th- 16th-century Bull Inn, a traditional Essex timber-framed house, and Fingreth Hall, in the north of the parish, where Sir Walter Mildmay, Chancellor of the Exchequer during the Elizabethan era lived. Fingrith was recorded in the Domesday Book as 'Phingaria' which was a Latinised form of its original Anglo-Saxon name, Fingreth, meaning 'the stream of the people of Fin'.

== Transport ==
The village is close to the Chelmsford Road, part of the A414, to the A12 and the M11 and M25 motorways; it has rail links from Brentwood—four miles away—to London. The 261 bus route connects the village to Brentwood. The 32 bus route also goes through the village connecting it to Ongar and Chelmsford. A 339 service operates from Blackmore to Ongar, Brentwood and Warley.
