= Bromfield Priory =

Monastery in Shropshire, England

Coordinates: 52.3869°N 2.7633°W

Bromfield Priory was a priory in Shropshire, England, located at Bromfield near Ludlow.

It was a college of secular canons, founded before 1061. The Domesday Book of 1086 records a remarkable amount of detail about the priory and its history. The priory held 20 hides of land in 1066 and 10 hides by 1086, including land at Halford, Dinchope, Ashford Bowdler, Felton, Burway, and Ledwyche, as well as the hamlets of Prior’s Halton, Lady Halton and Hill Halton.

In 1086 there were 12 canons. St Giles in Ludford was a chapel of the priory.

From 1258, the Priory was under the control of Gloucester Abbey: one of the priors of Bromfield, Henry Foliot, subsequently became Abbot of Gloucester.

In 1538, as part of the dissolution of the monasteries, the priory was closed; the priory house was acquired in 1541 by Charles Foxe. It remained the Foxe family home until it was destroyed by fire in the 17th century.

The priory church survives as Bromfield's parish church.

== See also ==
- St Mary the Virgin's Church, Bromfield
