= Oakly Park =

Grade II* listed house in Shropshire, United Kingdom

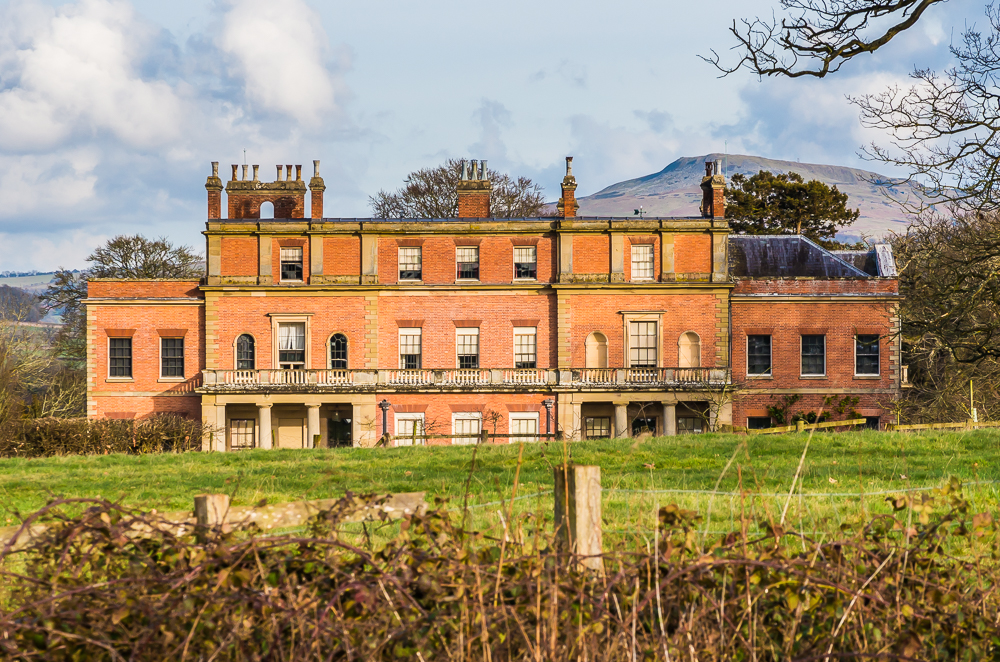

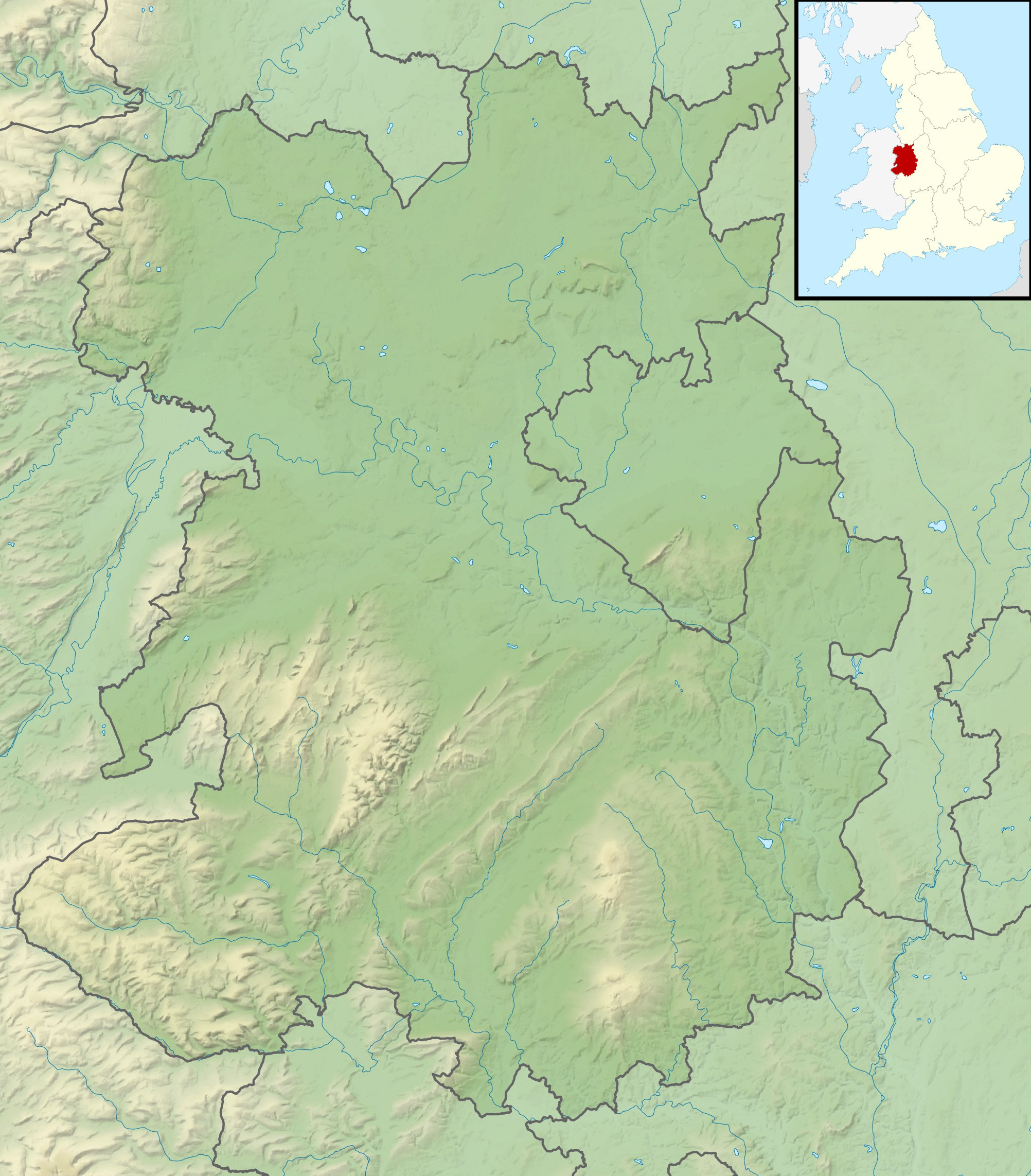
- Location within Shropshire
- 52.3832°N 2.7559°W
- Type: House
- Location: Bromfield, Shropshire

History
- Built: 18th century, restored and extended 1819-1836

Site notes
- Architect: Charles Robert Cockerell
- Architectural style: Neoclassical
- Owner: Robert Clive (1789–1854)

Listed Building – Grade II*
- Official name: Oakly Park
- Designated: 12 November 1954
- Reference no.: 1291872

Listed Building – Grade II
- Official name: Oakly Park Lodge
- Designated: 12 November 1954
- Reference no.: 1218684

Listed Building – Grade II
- Official name: Stable Complex, 200M south of Oakly Park
- Designated: 9 August 1993
- Reference no.: 1218686

Listed Building – Grade II
- Official name: Balustrade and retaining wall east of Oakly Park
- Designated: 9 August 1993
- Reference no.: 1281977

National Register of Historic Parks and Gardens
- Official name: Oakly Park Park and Garden
- Designated: 1 December 1986
- Reference no.: 1001131

Oakly Park, Bromfield, Shropshire, England is a country house dating from the 18th century. In the early 19th century, the house was restored and extended by Charles Robert Cockerell, Surveyor to the Bank of England for his friend Robert Henry Clive. The private home of the Earls of Plymouth, Oakly Park is a Grade II* listed building.

== History ==
The origins of the present house are a mansion rebuilt and extended by William Baker for the 1st Earl of Powis in the mid-18th century. In 1771, Powis sold the estate to Robert Clive, Clive of India, who engaged William Haycock to undertake rebuilding. Following Clive's death in 1774, his son, Edward, engaged Haycock's son, John Hiram Haycock to undertake further extensions for Clive's mother, Margaret, who continued to live at the property until her death in 1817. By the time of his mother's death, Edward had been created Earl of Powis, having married Henrietta Herbert, daughter of the Henry Herbert who had sold the Oakly estate to his father. Having inherited Powis Castle through his wife, he had little need for Oakly and its use passed to his second son, Robert.

Elected Member of Parliament for Ludlow in 1818, (Note: The History of Parliament records Clive as "an affable, somewhat indolent and generally silent member".) the following year Clive commissioned his friend Charles Robert Cockerell to remodel the house. Clive and Cockerell had toured Europe together, and co-founded the Travellers Club in Pall Mall. Cockerell's subsequent work on the excavations at Bassae in Greece provided inspiration for some of the decoration at Oakly Park. Work on the house was undertaken in two stages, between 1819 and 1826, and a second phase from 1836.

Oakly Park remains the private home of the Windsor-Clive family, the house presently being home to Lord Windsor, heir to the 4th Earl of Plymouth. The house and park are not open to the public.

== Architecture and description ==
Oakly is of brick and ashlar, three storeys high with attics and a basement. Newman and Pevsner in their revised Shropshire volume of the Buildings of England, consider five rooms of note. The vestibule is a circular room dating from the younger Haycock's work, although Cockerell added a "saucer dome". The staircase hall is entirely his, as is the "exquisitely restrained" library. The conservatory was the last element of the first phase of building, the breakfast and dining rooms dating from the second, when Clive, by then Windsor-Clive following his marriage to Harriet Hickman, joint heiress to the Earl of Plymouth, required more space for his expanding family.

Cockerell's conservatory was demolished in the 1920s, but the remainder of the early 19th century garden and park is largely intact. Oakly Park is a Grade II* listed building as is the garden and park in which it stands. Other listed structures within the estate, all designated Grade II, include the balustrade in the forecourt, the stables, the lodge and gates at the start of the carriage drive and a bridge on the carriage drive where it crosses the River Teme.

== Sources ==
- Newman, John; Pevsner, Nikolaus (2006). Shropshire. Buildings of England. New Haven, US and London: Yale University Press. ISBN 978-0-300-12083-7. OCLC 70671576.
