= Grade II* listed buildings in Brentwood (borough) =

There are over 20,000 Grade II* listed buildings in England. This page is a list of these buildings in the district of Brentwood in Essex.

== List of buildings ==
Name	Location	Type	Completed (Note: The date given is the date used by Historic England as significant for the initial building or that of an important part in the structure's description.)	Date designated	Grid ref. (Note: The grid reference is based on the British national grid reference system, sometimes known as OSGB36, used by the Ordnance Survey.) Geo-coordinates	Entry number (Note: The "List Entry Number" is a unique number assigned to each listed building and scheduled monument by Historic England.)	Image
Church of St Nicholas	Ingrave, Herongate and Ingrave	Parish church	1734	21 October 1958	TQ6232792024; 51°36′13″N 0°20′33″E	1205640	Church of St Nicholas More images
Granary 5 metres south-east of Heron Hall	Herongate, Herongate and Ingrave	Granary	Early 15th century	21 October 1958	TQ6392491751; 51°36′03″N 0°21′56″E	1280702	Upload Photo
Fryerning Hall	Fryerning, Ingatestone and Fryerning	House	17th century	29 December 1952	TL6392600191; 51°40′36″N 0°22′10″E	1052243	Upload Photo
Gatehouse and courtyard ranges 30 metres west of Ingatestone Hall	Ingatestone, Ingatestone and Fryerning	Jettied gatehouse	16th century	29 December 1952	TQ6534098550; 51°39′41″N 0°23′21″E	1197286	Gatehouse and courtyard ranges 30 metres west of Ingatestone Hall More images
Granary 130 metres north-west of Ingatestone Hall	Ingatestone, Ingatestone and Fryerning	Granary	Late 16th century	29 December 1952	TQ6530298626; 51°39′44″N 0°23′19″E	1298752	Upload Photo
Mill Green Windmill	Mill Green, Ingatestone and Fryerning	Post mill	1759	20 December 1952	TL6396700741; 51°40′53″N 0°22′13″E	1297199	Mill Green Windmill More images
98 High Street	Ingatestone, Ingatestone and Fryerning	House	Early 18th century	10 April 1967	TQ6497699546; 51°40′14″N 0°23′04″E	1297194	98 High Street
Hatch Farmhouse	Kelvedon Hatch	Farmhouse	Mid-16th century	27 August 1952	TQ5697898979; 51°40′04″N 0°16′07″E	1197316	Upload Photo
Mountnessing Windmill	Mountnessing	Mill	1807	29 December 1952	TQ6309997967; 51°39′25″N 0°21′23″E	1293205	Mountnessing Windmill More images
Church of All Saints	East Horndon, West Horndon	Church	15th century with earlier fragments	21 October 1958	TQ6355889524; 51°34′51″N 0°21′33″E	1197184	Church of All Saints More images
Little Warley Hall	Little Warley, West Horndon	House	Early 16th century	21 October 1958	TQ6043288571; 51°34′23″N 0°18′49″E	1197230	Little Warley Hall
Chantry Chapel and Mausoleum	Thorndon Park	Chapel	c.1850	20 February 1976	TQ6148091443; 51°35′55″N 0°19′48″E	1293260	Chantry Chapel and Mausoleum More images
Church of St Mary the Virgin	Shenfield	Parish church	15th century	21 October 1958	TQ6055795127; 51°37′55″N 0°19′06″E	1197213	Church of St Mary the Virgin More images
Church of St Thomas of Canterbury	Brentwood	Church	1881–87	20 February 1976	TQ5965093722; 51°37′11″N 0°18′17″E	1197244	Church of St Thomas of Canterbury More images
Lych gate at Church of St Mary the Virgin	Great Warley	Lych gate	1903	16 March 1993	TQ5892289995; 51°35′11″N 0°17′33″E	1206677	Lych gate at Church of St Mary the Virgin More images
Great Ropers	Great Warley	House	Late 18th century	21 October 1958	TQ5859791517; 51°36′01″N 0°17′19″E	1206489	Upload Photo
Two Door Cottage	Great Warley	House	18th century	21 October 1958	TQ5836790668; 51°35′33″N 0°17′05″E	1197209	Two Door Cottage More images
Church of All Saints	Hutton	Church	Early 14th century	21 October 1958	TQ6352194340; 51°37′27″N 0°21′39″E	1297263	Church of All Saints More images
Hutton Hall and attached stable block	Hutton	House	17th century	21 October 1958	TQ6343094464; 51°37′31″N 0°21′35″E	1280481	Hutton Hall and attached stable block More images
Church of St Peter	South Weald	Church	12th century and later	21 October 1958	TQ5713093869; 51°37′18″N 0°16′06″E	1297216	Church of St Peter More images
Moat House	South Weald	House	Early 16th century onwards	21 October 1958	TQ5787492897; 51°38′00″N 0°19′39″E	1279743	Moat House More images
The Golden Fleece Inn	South Weald	House	c.1400	21 October 1958	TQ5777892916; 51°36′47″N 0°16′38″E	1197231	The Golden Fleece Inn
Rosebrook	Childerditch	House	17th century	20 February 1976	TQ6146090233; 51°35′16″N 0°19′45″E	1197195	Upload Photo
Stable 5 metres south east of Lincolns	Pilgrims Hatch	Kitchen	c.1500	16 April 1986	TQ5624295463; 51°38′11″N 0°15′23″E	1207388	Stable 5 metres south east of Lincolns More images
Roden House	Shenfield Rd, Brentwood	House	By 1717	21 October 1958	TQ5978293917; 51°37′17″N 0°18′24″E	1208008	Roden House
The Old House	Shenfield Rd, Brentwood	House	c.1600	21 October 1958	TQ5973293955; 51°37′18″N 0°18′22″E	1197251	The Old House
White Hart Inn	Brentwood	Inn	Late 15th century	21 October 1958	TQ5933493750; 51°37′12″N 0°18′01″E	1372317	White Hart Inn More images

== See also ==
- Grade I listed buildings in Brentwood
