= List of road junctions in the United Kingdom: C =

This is a partial list of road junctions in the United Kingdom.

Many road junctions are named after pubs. For more information regarding the derivation of pub names, see pub names.

== C ==
Junction Name	Type	Location	Roads	Grid Reference	Notes
Cadditon Cross	Crossroads	Bondleigh, West Devon	A3124; unclass., to Bondleigh; unclass., to Monkokehampton	50.8262°N 3.9357°W	Named on road sign at junction
Caenby Corner		Caenby, Lincolnshire	A15; A631	53°23′34″N 0°32′51″W	
Caldecotte Roundabout		Caldecotte, Milton Keynes	A5 S/B; H10 (A4146) Bletcham Way	52°00′30″N 0°42′34″W	See also Bletcham Roundabout
Calder Roundabout		Hermiston, Edinburgh	A720 City of Edinburgh Bypass; A71 Calder Road	NT186704	
California Cross		Modbury, Ivybridge, Devon	B3196; B3207	50.362°N 3.823°W	
California Crossroads		Finchampstead, Berkshire	B3016; B3430 / Nine Mile Road	51.377°N 0.856°W	
Calver Crossroads		Calver, Derbyshire	A623 The Avenue; A623 Kingsgate; A625 Main Road; B6001 Hassop Road	53°16′13″N 1°38′35″W	
Calverton Lane Roundabout		Two Mile Ash, Milton Keynes	V4 Watling Street; Calverton Lane	52°02′28″N 0°49′12″W	
Camberwell Green		Camberwell, LB Southwark	A202 Camberwell New Road; A202 Camberwell Church Street; A215 Camberwell Road; A215 Denmark Hill	51°28′28″N 0°05′36″W	
Cambridge Circus	Crossroads	Central London	Shaftesbury Avenue; Charing Cross Road	TQ299810	
Cambridge Junction		Portsmouth, Hampshire	A3 High Street; A3 Cambridge Road; B2154 St George's Road; B2154 Museum Road	SZ636996	
Cambuslang Road Junction		Rutherglen, South Lanarkshire	M74 J2; A724 Cambuslang Road	55.8295°N 4.1978°W	
Camel Cross		West Camel, Somerset	A303; B3151 Heathcote Road; unclass.	ST566249	
Camelford Station	Staggered	Slaughterbridge, Cornwall	B3266; B3314	50.6385°N 4.6883°W	Named on road sign approaching from N
Campbell Park Roundabout	Roundabout	Central Milton Keynes	Silbury Boulevard; Marlborough Gate	52°02′49″N 0°45′01″W	
Camp Hill Circus	Roundabout	Camp Hill, Birmingham	A4540 Bordesley Middleway A4540 Highgate Middleway B4100 Camp Hill A34 Stratford Road		
Canal Bridge		Peckham, LB Southwark	A2 Old Kent Road; A2208 St James's Road	51°29′03″N 0°03′59″W	
Canalside Roundabout	Roundabout	Milton Keynes	Overgate; Avebury Boulevard	SP868396	
Canaston Bridge		Pembrokeshire	A40; A4075	51.8017°N 4.8047°W	
Canderside Toll		Larkhall, South Lanarkshire	M74 J8; B7078 Carlisle Road (formerly A74); A71	NS770483	
Canderwater Interchange (former site of)		Canderwater, South Lanarkshire	M74 J8; B7078 Carlisle Road	NS786447	For many years this marked the point where the M74 motorway became the A74.
Canegore Corner		West Camel, Somerset	A303; Steart Hill; Howell Hill	ST578254	
Canklow Roundabout		Canklow, South Yorkshire	A630 Centenary Way; A631 West Bawtry Road	53°24′35″N 1°21′44″W	
Cannard's Grave		Shepton Mallet, Somerset	A37; A371 Cannard's Grave Road; A361 Fosse Lane	51°10′34″N 2°32′06″W	Named for a local highwayman who was hanged here
Canning Town		Canning Town, LB Newham	A13 East India Dock Road; A13 Newham Way; A124 Barking Road; A1011 Manor Road; A1011 Silvertown Way	51°30′56″N 0°00′30″E	
Cannock Interchange: aka Laney Green	Roundabout Interchange	Cannock, Staffordshire	M6 J11; A460 Cannock Road; A460 Wolverhampton Road; A462 Warstone Road	52°39′28″N 2°03′49″W	The dual carriageway A460 Wolverhampton Road was built to connect with the M6 (Toll), the original route no longer connects to the roundabout.
Canons Corner		Stanmore, LB Harrow	A5 Brockley Hill; A5 Stonegrove High Street; A410 London Road; A410 Spur Road	51°37′19″N 0°17′34″W	
Capability Green Junction		Luton, Bedfordshire	A1081 Airport Way; Capability Green Business Park	51°51′44″N 0°24′30″W	Named after the business park.
Cardnold Interchange		Glasgow	M8 J25; A739 Berryknowes Road; Fifty Pitches Road	55°51′17″N 4°20′35″W	webcam
Carfax	Crossroads	Oxford	St. Aldate's; Cornmarket Street; Queen Street; High Street	SP513062	Derived from the French for 'Crossroads', Carrefour.
Carholme Roundabout		Lincoln, Lincolnshire	A46; A57 Saxiby Road	SK953272	
Carland Cross		Mitchell, Cornwall	A30; A39; unclass.	SW847540	
Carmyle Avenue Interchange		Glasgow	M74 J2; A763 Carmyle Avenue	55°50′05″N 4°09′36″W	
Carpenters Lodge Roundabout	Grade Separated Dumbbell Interchange	Stamford, Lincolnshire	A1; B1081 Old Great North Road	TF037046	Named after the Carpenters Lodge, a few hundred metres south along the A1, where it intersects Racecourse Road. Upgraded from a roundabout to grade separated dumbbell interchange in 2008/9
Carracawn Cross		Hessenford, Cornwall	A387; unclass.	SX322573	
Carrville Interchange		Durham, County Durham	A1(M) J62; A690	54°47′38″N 1°31′46″W	
Castle Bromwich		Castle Bromwich, West Midlands	M6 J5; A452 Newport Road; A452 Chester Road	52°30′30″N 1°47′41″W	
Castle Gate Island		Dudley, West Midlands	A459 The Broadway; A461 Birmingham Road; A461 Duncan Edwards Way; A4037 Tipton Road	52°30′48″N 2°04′24″W	Duncan Edwards Way is named after the local football player killed in the Munich air crash.
Catcliffe Roundabout		Rotherham, South Yorkshire	M1 J33; A630 Rotherway	53°23′57″N 1°20′57″W	
Catford Gyratory		Catford, LB Lewisham	A250 Catford Road; A205 Brownhill Road; A21 Bromley Road; A21 Rushey Green	51°26′46″N 0°01′10″W	
Cathill Roundabout		Darfield, South Yorkshire	A635 Doncaster Road; A6195 Rotherham Road	53°32′02″N 1°21′14″W	
Caton Cross		Goodstone, Devon	A38; unclass.	SX782718	
Catshill Interchange		Catshill, Worcestershire	M5 J4a; M42	SO954729	
Catterlen		Penrith, Cumbria	M6 J41; B5305	54°41′38″N 2°47′29″W	
Catthorpe Interchange		Catthorpe, Leicestershire	M1 J19; M6; A14	52°24′11″N 1°10′36″W	
Causeway Roundabout	Roundabout	Arundel, West Sussex	A27 Arundel Bypass; The Causeway; A27 The Causeway	TQ 02219 06633	
Caxton Gibbet	Roundabout	Caxton, Cambridgeshire	A1198 Ermine St South (formerly A14); A428 St Neots Road (formerly A45)	52°13′43″N 0°06′12″W	
Cemetery Junction		Bournemouth	A347 Wimborne Road; B3063 Charminster Road; B3064 Landsdowne Road	50.732°N 1.8740°W	Next to the main Bournemouth Cemetery. The main London-Waterloo to Weymouth, Dorset railway line passes below this junction.
Cemetery Junction		Reading	A4 London Road; A329 Wokingham Road; A329 Kings Road	51°27′10″N 0°56′57″W	
Chain Bar Interchange		Cleckheaton, West Yorkshire	M62 J26; M606; A58 Whitehall Road; A638 Bradford Road; Bradford Road	53°44′12″N 1°43′36″W	
Chalker's Corner		LB Richmond upon Thames	A316 Clifford Avenue; A316 Lower Richmond Road; A3003 Lower Richmond Road; A205 South Circular Road	51°28′09″N 0°16′35″W	Named after John Chalker's shop in 1911, it remained in the Chalker family until around 1993 after which it became a veterinary surgery - Medivet.
Chandler's Corner		Rainham, LB Havering	A1306 New Road (formerly A13); Upminster Road North; Upminster Road South	51°31′14″N 0°12′20″E	
Chapel Ash Island		Wolverhampton, West Midlands	A4150 Ring Road; A41 Chapel Ash; Darlington Street	52°35′06″N 2°08′05″W	
Chapel Cross		South Cadbury, Somerset	A303; Parish Hill; Church Road	ST631263	
Charaton Cross		Charaton, Cornwall	Globerdon Road; unclass.	SX301698	
Charing Cross (on Trafalgar Square)	Crossroads	City of Westminster	A4 The Strand; A400 Charing Cross Road; A3212 Whitehall; Northumberland Avenue; The Mall; St. Martin's Lane	51°30′28″N 0°07′38″W	
Charlestown Junction		Charlestown, Fife	A90 Stonehaven Road; A956 Wellington Road	NJ932006	
Charlie Brown's Roundabout	Roundabout Interchange	South Woodford, LB Redbridge	M11 J4; A406 North Circular Road; A1400 Southend Road; A113 Chigwell Road	51°35′37″N 0°02′12″E	The pub on the roundabout was called The Roundabout but known as Charlie Brown's (the landlord was the son of Charlie Brown, a boxer and landlord of a pub of the same name in Limehouse). This pub was demolished in the 70s with the construction of the M11.
Charlie Sweep's Corner		Garforth, West Yorkshire	A63 Selby Road; B6137 Leeds Road	53°47′02″N 1°23′09″W	
Charvill's Roundabout		Ware, Hertfordshire	A1170 Baldock Street; B1001 Watton Road	TL356146	Named after former motor repair and car dealer on the site
Cheals Roundabout		Crawley, West Sussex	A23 Crawley Avenue; A2220 Horsham Road	51°06′24″N 0°12′15″W	Immediately next to the century-old Cheals nursery - MichaelT1979
Cheam Village		Cheam, LB Sutton	A232 Ewell Road; A232 High Street; A2043 The Broadway; B283 Station Way	51°21′28″N 0°12′59″W	
Cheerbrook Roundabout		Nantwich, Cheshire	A500; Newcastle Road (spur to A51); unclass. road to Willaston; unclass. road to Shavington	SJ674517	Situated next to Cheerbrook Farm
Cheldon Cross	Staggered	Chulmleigh, North Devon	unclass. roads to: Chulmleigh N; Worlington E; Lapford S; Chawleigh W	50.9074°N 3.7995°W	Named on fingerpost
Chelston Roundabout		Wellington, Somerset	A38 West Buckland Road; (spur to M5 J26); B3187 Taunton Road	50°58′55″N 3°12′15″W	
Chequerbent Roundabout		Over Hulton, Greater Manchester	A6 Manchester Road; A58 Park Road; A58 Snydale Way	53°33′05″N 2°29′52″W	
Cherwell Valley Interchange		Ardley, Oxfordshire	M40 J10; A43; B430 Station Road (formerly A43)	51°56′54″N 1°12′20″W	
Chevening Cross	Crossroads	Chevening, Kent	B2211 Sundridge Road; Chevening Road	51°17′34″N 0°08′23″E	
Chevening Interchange		Chevening, Kent	M25 J5; M26 J1	51°17′29″N 0°08′36″E	
Chieveley Interchange	Roundabout Interchange	Chieveley, Berkshire	M4 J13; A34	51°27′09″N 1°18′37″W	
Child's Corner		South Woodford, LB Redbridge	A406 Southend Road; Mulberry Way; Maybank Road	TQ409904	Originally a cross roads, with the construction of the M11 terminus at Charlie Browns this junction now just provides restricted access to residential streets
Chiswell Interchange		Bricket Wood, Hertfordshire	M1 J6a; M25 J21	51°42′59″N 0°23′08″W	
Chiswick Roundabout: aka Hogarth Roundabout		Gunnersbury, LB Hounslow	M4 J1; A4 Great West Road; A406 Gunnersbury Avenue; A205 Chiswick High Road; A315 Chiswick High Road	51°29′29″N 0°16′55″W	
Chiverton Cross		Blackwater, Cornwall	A30; A390; A3075; B3277; unclass. (formerly A30)	SW747470	
Chowns Mill Roundabout		Higham Ferrers, Northamptonshire	A45; A6; A6 Station Road; A5028 Station Road	SP959699	
Churchill Gate		Churchill, Somerset	A368 Dinghurst Road; A368 Bath Road; A38 New Road; A38 Bristol Road	ST448598	
Cinder Bank Island		Dudley, West Midlands	A461 Duncan Edwards Way; A459 Cinder Bank; B4177, Blowers Green Road (former A459); Pear Tree Lane	52°30′01″N 2°05′27″W	Duncan Edwards Way is named after the local football player killed in the Munich air crash.
Cinderhill		Nottingham, Nottinghamshire	A610; A610 Nuthall Road; B6008 Bells Lane; Cinderhill Road	SK536436	
City Road Junction		Stoke-on-Trent, Staffordshire	A500 Queensway; A52; A5007 City Road	SJ881451	
Claggybottom	Crossroads	Kimpton, Hertfordshire	unclass.; unclass.	51°51′19″N 0°18′39″W	
Clandon Crossroads		West Clandon, Surrey	A25 Epsom Road; A246 Epsom Road; A247 The Street; A25 Shere Road	TQ046510	
Clapham Common		Clapham, LB Lambeth	A3 Long Road; A3 Clapham High Street; A24 Clapham Common South Side; A2217 Clapham Park Road; B303 The Pavement	TQ294753	
Clark's Green Roundabout		Capel, Surrey	A24 Capel Bypass; A24 Horsham Road; Rusper Road; Wolves Hill (formerly A24)	TQ171398	
Clay Corner		Chertsey, Surrey	A317 Eastworth Road; A317 Chertsey Road; B387 Fordwater Road	TQ049660	
Clay Mills		Burton upon Trent, Staffordshire	A38; A5121 Derby Road	52°50′15″N 1°36′46″W	(aka Burton North)
Cleveland Tontine		Ingleby Arncliffe, North Yorkshire	A19 Mount Bank; A172	54°23′14″N 1°19′09″W	Named after the inn at the junction
Clifton's Roundabout	Roundabout	Horn Park, Eltham, LB Greenwich	A20 Sidcup Road; A205 Westhorne Avenue	51°27′0″N 0°1′45″E	Named after the Clifton Service Station, the adjacent Esso garage. Sometimes referred to as the World of Leather roundabout, from the store formerly located opposite.
The Clock	Roundabout Interchange	Welwyn, Hertfordshire	A1(M) J6; A1000 Welwyn By-Pass; B197 Great North Road; B656 Church Street	51°50′0″N 0°12′34″W	Named after the hotel on the site, and notable for having Roman Baths excavated under the A1 at the southern end of the junction
Clockhouse Roundabout		LB Hounslow	A30 Great South West Road; A315 Staines Road; B3003 Clockhouse Lane; Bedfont Road	51°26′57″N 0°26′49″W	
Clovelly Cross	Roundabout	Higher Clovelly, near Clovelly, Devon	A39; B3237	50.9847°N 4.4048°W	
Coal House Roundabout		Team Valley, Gateshead	A1 Western Bypass Road; Chowdene Bank; Kingsway South; Banesley Lane	54°55′16″N 1°36′45″W	The NCB had a regional headquarters there in the 1970s. The site is now occupied by a Sainsbury's.
Cobbler's Corner		East Kirkby, Lincolnshire	A155 Sleaford Road; unclass.	TF341627	
Cockhedge Green Island	Roundabout	Warrington, Cheshire	A57 Midland Way; A49 Lythgoes Lane; Battersby Lane; A57 Manchester Road; A49 Brick Street	SJ611885	
Codnor		Codnor, Ripley, Derbyshire	A610 Nottingham Road; A610 Market Place; A6007 Heanor Road; Mill Street; Alfreton Road	SK420496	
Coffee Hall Roundabout		Coffee Hall, Milton Keynes	H8 (A421) Standing Way; V7 (B4034) Saxon Street	52°01′19″N 0°44′20″W	
Coisley Hill Roundabout		Handsworth, South Yorkshire	A57; B6064 Coisley Hill; B6064 Normanton Spring Road	53°21′21″N 1°23′19″W	
Coldra Interchange		Newport	M4 J24; A449; A48 Chepstow Road; A48 Ringland Way (formerly A455); B4237 Chepstow Road (formerly A48)	ST360896	
Coldwind Cross	Crossroads	near Coldwind, Cornwall	Grenna Lane; Greenwith Hill; unclass.	SW771406	
Colenso Cross	Crossroads	Perran Downs, Cornwall	Trescowe Road; Packet Lane	SW559305	
Colham Roundabout		Colham Green, LB Hillingdon	A408 Park View Road; Park View Road; A408 Stockley Road	51°31′06″N 0°27′25″W	
Collan's Cross		near Camelford, Cornwall	A39; B3314	SX122853	
College Road Roundabout		Rotherham, South Yorkshire	A630 Centenary Way; A629 New Wortley Road; B6089 Greasbrough Street	53°25′59″N 1°21′48″W	
Colliers Wood		Colliers Wood, LB Merton	A24 Christchurch Road; A238 High Street	51°25′04″N 0°10′42″W	
Colnbrook Interchange	Four Level Stack	Slough, Berkshire	M25 J15; M4 J4b	51°25′04″N 0°10′42″W	
Colsterworth Roundabout		Colsterworth, Lincolnshire	A1; A151; B676 Bourne Road	52°48′13″N 0°36′39″W	
Concord Roundabout	Roundabout	Heathrow, LB Hillingdon	M4 J4a; Tunnel Road West; Tunnel Road East; East Ramp; West Ramp; unclass.	TQ075769	Named after the model Concorde plane that was sited on the roundabout for 16 years.
The Cone Roundabout		Bristol	Merlin Road; Lysander Road	ST582809	
Connaught Roundabout	Roundabout	Custom House, LB Newham	A1020 Royal Albert Way; A112 Victoria Dock Road; A1020 Connaught Bridge; Lynx Way	TQ416808	
Cook's Corner		Harwich, Essex	B1352 Harwich Road; Station Road	TM174308	
Cooks Ferry Roundabout	Roundabout Interchange	LB Waltham Forest	A406 North Circular Road; A406 Service Road to Hall Lane Junction; Advent Way; Harbet Road	51°36′46″N 0°02′15″W	
Coombe Cross	Crossroads	Ashburton, Devon	Pitley Road; unclass.	SX782707	
Coombe Cross	Crossroads	Tipton St John, Devon	unclassified roads: South and West was B3176	50.7198°N 3.2829°W	
Coombe Lane Junction		New Malden, Royal Borough of Kingston	A3 Beverley Way; A238 Coombe Lane	51°24′56″N 0°15′03″W	
Coombe Street Lane Roundabout		Yeovil, Somerset	A37 Coombe Street Lane; Thorne Lane	50°57′24″N 2°38′58″W	
Cooper Dean	Roundabout with Flyover	Bournemouth, Dorset	A338 Wessex Way / Spur Road; A3060 Castle Lane East / Castle Lane West	50.7477°N 1.8281°W	Named after a local landowner
Coopers Cross	T junction	Chawleigh, Mid Devon	unclass. roads to: Leigh N; East Leigh E; Labbett's Cross S	50.8917°N 3.8140°W	Named on fingerpost
The Comet Roundabout	Roundabout	Hatfield, Hertfordshire	A1001 Comet Road (formerly A1); A1057 St Albans Road West (formerly A414); B6426 Cavendish Way	51°45′38″N 0°14′35″W	Named after the pub-hotel on the roundabout, itself named after the de Havilland DH.88 Comet. Aerospace connections all over the town are evident in road and junction names.
Commonhead Roundabout	Roundabout Interchange	Swindon, Wiltshire	A419; A4259 Marlborough Road; B4192 Purley Road; Pack Hill	SU193824	Work to add a flyover for A419 over the roundabout completed 2007
Cop Hall Roundabout	Roundabout	Polegate, East Sussex	A27; A22; A27 Polegate Bypass; Hailsham Road	TQ 57781 05623	
Copdock Interchange	Roundabout Interchange	Ipswich, Suffolk	A12 J33; A14 J55; A1214	52°02′10″N 1°05′54″E	
Coppid Beech Roundabout	Roundabout	Bracknell / Wokingham	A329(M); A329; B3408	51.413°N 0.799°W	
Copt Heath		Copt Heath, West Midlands	M42 J5; A41 Solihull By-pass; A4141 (formerly A41)	SP171786	
Corey's Mill	Roundabout Interchange	Stevenage, Hertfordshire	A1(M) J8; A206 Little Wymondley; A602 Hitchin Road; Stevenage Road (formerly A602); B198 Graveley Road	51°55′40″N 0°13′11″W	
Corntown Cross		Cornwood, Devon	Tuckers Hill; unclass.	SX604588	
Coseley Road Island		Bilston	A463; A4039 Coseley Road; Coseley Road		Coseley Road is the original route of the A463.
Cotley Hill Roundabout		Warminster, Wiltshire	A36; B3414; High Street; unclass.	51°11′06″N 2°07′12″W	Named after the Hillfort north of the roundabout
Countess Wear Roundabout	Roundabout	Countess Wear, Exeter	A379; A3015 / Topsham Road	50.7003°N 3.4935°W	
Cowley Interchange		Cowley, Oxfordshire	A4142 Eastern By-pass Road; B480 Garsington Road; B480 Watlington Road	51°43′47″N 1°12′09″W	
County Islands: see The Magic Roundabout, Swindon
Coven Heath: aka Fordhouse		Coven, Staffordshire	M54 J2; A449 Stafford Road; A4510	52°38′17″N 2°07′32″W	The A4510 partly runs along the motorway slip roads to the west of the roundabout and also serves the i54 industrial park.
Craigend Interchange		Perth, Scotland	M90 J10; A912	NO121204	
Craighall		Port Dundas, Scotland	M8 J16; A879	NS592664	webcam
Craigton Interchange		Glasgow	M8 J30; M898	55°54′04″N 4°29′03″W	
Crawley Junction		Crawley, West Sussex	M23 J10; A264 Copthorne Way; A2011 Crawley Avenue	TQ301387	
Crelly Cross		Porkellis, near Helston, Cornwall	B3297; unclass.	50.1514°N 5.2510°W	
Cribbs Causeway Interchange		Bristol	M5 J17; A4018 Cribbs Causeway; B4055 Cribbs Causeway; Merlin Road	ST578813	
Cribbs Causeway Roundabout		Bristol	A4018 Cribbs Causeway; Lysander Road	ST574809	
Crick		Crick, Northamptonshire	M1 J18; A428	52°21′02″N 1°09′17″W	
Crittall's Corner	Roundabout with flyover	Sidcup, Kent	A20 Sidcup Bypass; A224 Sevenoaks Way / Cray Road; A223 Edgington Way	51°24′47″N 0°6′47″E	Named after a Crittall Windows factory that was located there.
Croft Interchange		Warrington, Cheshire	M6 J21a; M62 J10	53°25′31″N 2°33′03″W	
Crookbarrow		Worcester, Worcestershire	M5 J7; A44 Church Lane	52°10′07″N 2°10′50″W	Named after Crookbarrow Hill overlooking the interchange
The Crooked Billett Roundabout		Staines, Surrey	A30 London Road; A30 Staines By-pass; A308 London Road; A308 Staines By-pass; A3044 Stanwell Moor	51°26′13″N 0°30′01″W	
The Crooked Billet	Roundabout Interchange	Walthamstow, LB Waltham Forest	A406 Southend Road; A112 Chingford Road; B179 Billet Road; Wadham Road	51°36′03″N 0°00′57″W	
Crooklands		Crooklands, Cumbria	M6 J36; A65; A590	54°14′13″N 2°42′59″W	
The Cross in Hand		Lutterworth, Leicestershire	A5 Watling Street; A4303 Coventry Road (formerly A4114); B4027 Lutterworth Road (formerly A4114); Coal Pit Lane	52°27′03″N 1°15′21″W	
Cross Lanes	Crossroads	near Chacewater, Cornwall	unclass.; unclass.	SW766428	
Cross Lanes		Heighington, County Durham	A68 West Auckland Road; Walworth Road	54°35′05″N 1°37′55″W	
Crossbush Roundabout	Unfinished Interchange Junction / Roundabout	Crossbush, Arundel, West Sussex	A27 The Causeway; A27 Arundel Road; A284 Lyminster Road	TQ 02879 05908	This junction was built as part of a short bypass of Crossbush, to feed onto the Arundel Bypass, which was never constructed.
The Crosshands		Llandenny, Monmouthshire	unclass.; unclass.	SO431039	
Crosspoles Junction		Laurencekirk, Aberdeenshire	A90; B974	NO671678	
Crosthwaite Roundabout		Keswick, Cumbria	A66; A591; A5271 Crosthwaite Road	54°36′34″N 3°08′28″W	
Crown and Sceptre		Feltham, LB Hounslow	A315 Staines Road; A244 Hounslow Road	51°27′31″N 0°24′12″W	
The Crown Crossroads		Walton, Merseyside	A580 East Lancashire Road; A580 Walton Hall Avenue; B5187 Long Lane; B5187 Parthenon Drive	SJ379953	
Crown Island		Nottingham, Nottinghamshire	A6514 Nottingham Ring Road; A609 Wollaton Road; Radford Bridge Road	SK543400	Named after the pub on the north side of the roundabout
Crownhill Roundabout		Crownhill, Milton Keynes	H4 Dansteed Way; V4 Watling Street	52°02′04″N 0°48′15″W	
Crowwood Roundabout		Stepps, North Lanarkshire	M80 J3 spur; A80 Cumbernauld Road; Dewar Road	NS670690	webcam
Cuckolds Cross	Crossroads	Kimpton, Hertfordshire	B651 Hitchin Road; tracks	51°51′37″N 0°17′35″W	
Culdrose Roundabout	Roundabout	Culdrose, Helston, Cornwall	A3083 to The Lizard / Helston; B3293 to Goonhilly Downs	50.0733°N 5.2401°W	
Cumberland Basin System		Hotwells, Bristol	A4 Hotwell Road; A3029	ST569724	Named after the area of Bristol's Floating Harbour it bridges. The Cumberland Basin itself is named after the Duke of Cumberland who was a chief financier of the new entrance to the Floating Harbour.
Cumbernauld Road Interchange		Riddrie, Glasgow	M8 J12; A80 Cumbernauld Road; B765 Gartloch Road	55°52′25″N 4°11′04″W	
