= List of road junctions in the United Kingdom: O =

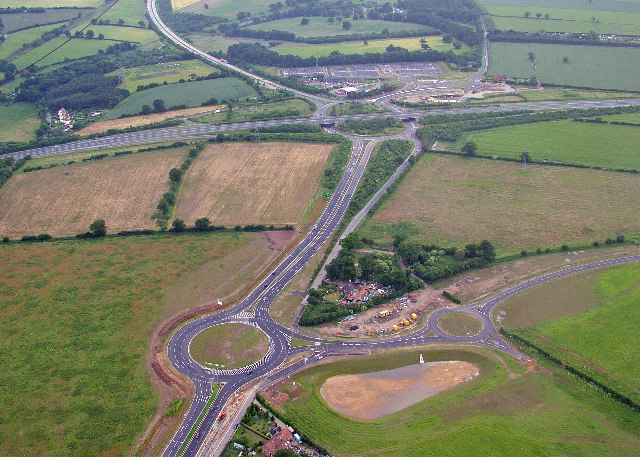
Thickthorn Interchange

This is part of the list of road junctions in the United Kingdom.

Many road junctions are named after pubs. For more information regarding the derivation of pub names see pub names.

== O ==
Junction Name	Type	Location	Roads	Grid Reference	Notes
Oakfield Corner		Amersham, Buckinghamshire	A416 Chesham Road; B4441 Sycamore Road; Hill Avenue	51°40′37″N 0°36′27″W	
Oakgrove Roundabout		Monkston, Milton Keynes	H7 Chaffron Way; V10 Brickhill Street	52°02′15″N 0°42′33″W	
Oakhill Roundabout		Oakhill, Milton Keynes	H5 Portway; V2 Tattenhoe Street	52°01′09″N 0°48′33″W	
Ober Corner		Ober Heath, New Forest	unclass.; unclass.	50°49′51″N 1°35′50″W	
Ockham Junction: aka Stratford Bridge		Ockham, Surrey	A3 Ripley By-pass; B2215 Portsmouth road (formerly A3); B2039 Ockham Road	54°06′31″N 0°27′17″W	
Octon Crossroads		North Yorkshire	B1249 Scarborough Road; B1253 High Street	54°06′31″N 0°27′17″W	
Odsal Top		Bradford, West Yorkshire	A641 Manchester Road; A6177 Smiddles Lane	SE158306	
Offington Corner	Roundabout	Worthing, West Sussex	A27 Crockhurst Hill; A24 Findon Road; A27/A24 Warren Road; A2031 Offington Lane; Goodwood Road	TQ 13255 05598	
Offley Cross	Crossroads	Hitchin, Hertfordshire	A505; Carters Lane (aka Wibbly Wobbley Lane)	51°56′30″N 0°18′23″W	
Old Craighall		Musselburgh, Scotland	A1; A720 City of Edinburgh Bypass; B6415 Old Craighall Road	NT338707	
Old Cross	Crossroads	Hertford, Hertfordshire	B158 Cowbridge; B158 The Wash; St Andrews Street	TL325127	
Old Ford	Diamond Interchange	Old Ford, London	A12 East Cross Route (formerly A102(M)); B142 Wick Lane	51°32′02″N 0°01′20″W	Site of the historic ford along the Roman road from London to Essex (now mostly consisting of the A118 and then A12)
Old Inns Interchange		Cumbernauld, North Lanarkshire	A80; A8011; B816	NS770766	
Old Malton Roundabout		Malton, North Yorkshire	A64; A169; B1257	SE801734	
The Old Pond	Roundabout	Cheshunt, Hertfordshire	B176 Turner's Hill (formerly A10); B198 College Road (formerly A121)	51°42′07″N 0°02′05″W	
Old Street Roundabout		The City, London	A501 City Road; A5201 Old Street	51°31′34″N 0°05′16″W	
Old Wolverton Roundabout		Wolverton, Milton Keynes	V5 Great Monks Street; Stratford Road	52°03′42″N 0°49′46″W	
The Oldbury Interchange		West Midlands	M5 J2; A4123; A4034; Asda supermarket access road	52°29′33″N 2°01′07″W	The supermarket access road is off the adjacent island which passes under the M5.
Ollerton Roundabout		Ollerton, Nottinghamshire	A614 Blyth Road; A614 Old Rufford Road; A616 Worksop Road; A616 Ollerton Road; A6075 Mansfield Road; Newark Road	53°12′04″N 1°01′38″W	
The Organ Crossroads		Ewell, Surrey	A24 Ewell Bypass; A240 London Road; B2200 London Road	51°21′15″N 0°14′46″W	
Orrell Interchange		Orrell, Wigan	M6 J26; M58 J6; A577	53°32′03″N 2°41′54″W	
Orsett Cock	Roundabout Interchange	Orsett, Thurrock (formerly in Essex)	A13; A128 Brentwood Road; A1013 Stanford Road (former A13); Brentwood Road (southern end, former A128)	TQ654812	Named after the pub at the site of the former crossroads.
Ossie Garvin Roundabout	Roundabout Interchange	Hayes, LB Hillingdon	A312 The Parkway; A4020 Uxbridge Road	51°30′58″N 0°24′05″W	Named after a local councillor who originally proposed the Hayes By-Pass, and died shortly before it was completed in 1992.
Ottershaw Roundabout		Ottershaw, Surrey	A319 Chobham Road; A320 Guildford Road; B3121 Murray Road	TQ022639	
The Oval, Kennington		Kennington, London	A3 Kennington Park Road; A202 Camberwell New Road; A23 Brixton Road	TQ312776	
Oxley Park Roundabout		Westcroft, Milton Keynes	H6 Childs Way; V2 Tattenhoe Street	52°00′38″N 0°47′54″W	
Oxford Circus		London	A40 Oxford Street; A4201 Regent Street	51°30′55″N 0°08′31″W	
