= A127 road =

Road in Essex, England

A127

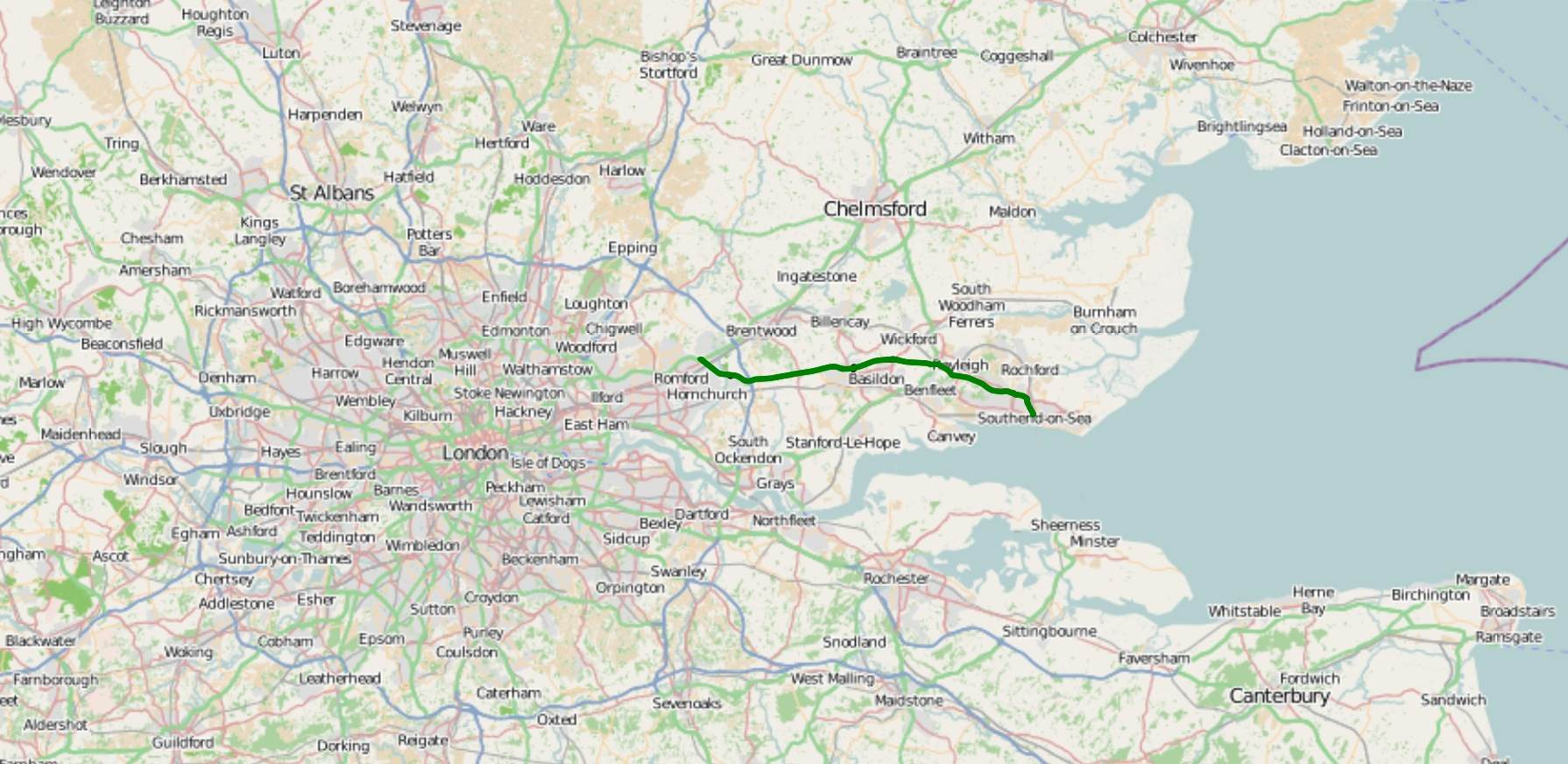
- Click map to enlarge

Route information
- Length: 23 mi (37 km)

Major junctions
- West end: (Romford)
- A12 M25 Junction 29 A128 A130 A1245; A13
- East end: Southend-on-Sea

Location
- Country: United Kingdom
- Primary destinations: Basildon

Road network
- Roads in the United Kingdom; Motorways; A and B road zones

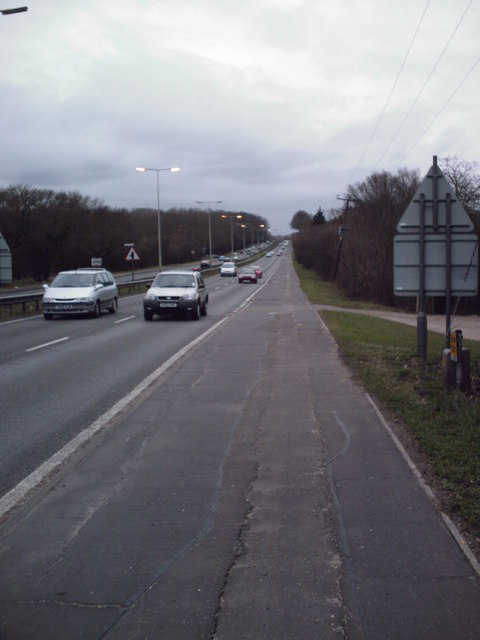
The A127 looking Eastbound (Southend-bound)

The A127, also known as the Southend Arterial Road, is a major road in Greater London and Essex, England. It was constructed as a new arterial road project in the 1920s, linking Romford with Southend-on-Sea, replacing the older A13. Formerly classified as a trunk road, it was "de-trunked" in 1997. It is known as the Southend Arterial Road except for part of its length in Southend-on-Sea. It is also streetlit for its whole length despite its majority coverage through rural land.

== Route ==
The A127 starts as a turning off the A12 at Gallows Corner in the London Borough of Havering. Traffic heading towards London goes over a flyover and joins the A12 traffic which merges onto the slip-road from the roundabout below, which is where the A127 ends. Traffic heading towards Southend also uses the flyover as well as slip roads. Its first significant junction is a crossroads after 1/2 mile (0.80 km) (Squirrels Heath) with Squirrels Heath Road and Ardleigh Green Road. There are traffic lights here, but after that, there are no traffic lights or roundabouts until it enters Southend-on-Sea, though there are a few side turnings.

Major junctions follow the layout similar to motorways, being served by high-level or low-level roundabouts accessed via slip roads, except for the straight flyover at the junction with Hall Lane, Upminster at about 3.5 km east of Gallows Corner. 4 miles (6.4 km) after Gallows Corner the A127 crosses the M25 motorway at M25 Junction 29 - the start of slip-roads on the A127, and then immediately crosses into Brentwood. After a couple of minor side road exits, the next major junction is with the A128 Brentwood exit at the Halfway House (pub) near West Horndon, 3 miles (4.8 km) east of the M25.

It continues through southern Essex and into the Basildon district. The next junction is 2 miles (3.2 km) east of the Halfway House, for the Dunton (Ford centre) and Laindon exit.

1 mile (1.6 km) further on there is a junction called the Fortune of War. Originally this site was a roundabout with two exits for local routes around Laindon, with a Happy Eater restaurant and the Fortune of War public house adjacent to the roundabout. Some years ago, Essex County Council tried to improve safety on the route by filling in the middle of the road so the junction is no longer a roundabout, but the road layout still resembles one by not being straight.

After the Fortune of War, the first of the Basildon exits appears immediately, for the A176 to Basildon town centre and hospital, and Billericay. After a couple of exits to Crays Hill, the next junction is over 2 miles (3.2 km) on for the A132 Basildon and Wickford exit. London bound there is an exit for the Mayflower Retail Park just past the A132, so traffic Southend bound needs to use the roundabout to head the other way briefly to the Mayflower exit.

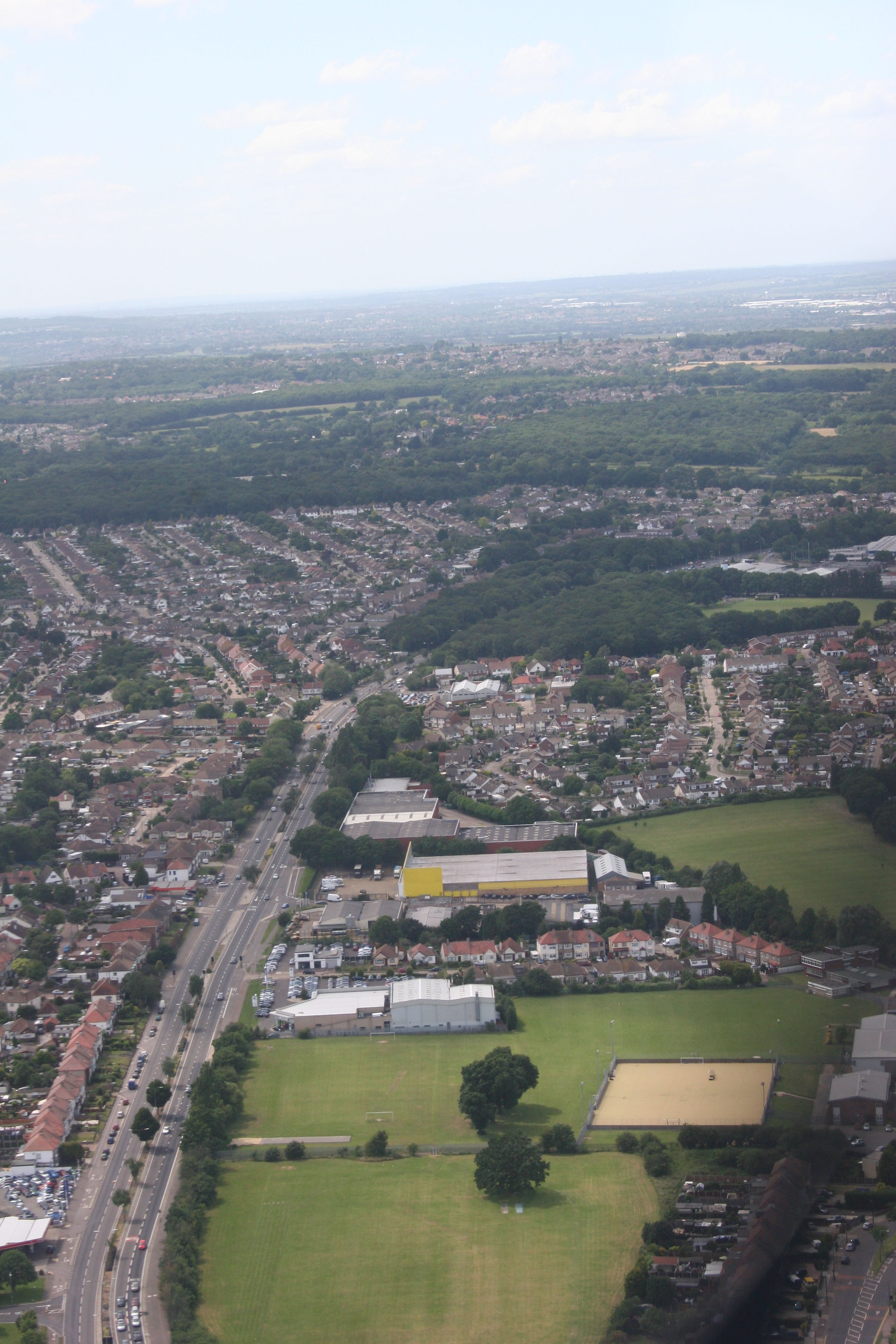
A127/A1015 looking London bound

2 miles (3.2 km) on Southend bound is the junction with the A1245 (old A130) and new A130 Chelmsford/Canvey Island exit. Indeed, the new A130 bridge over the A127 just before this exit is one of only two non-junction bridges on the entire stretch of road (the other being between the Fortune of War and A176, a minor road to Steeple View). 2 miles (3.2 km) further on is the A129 exit to Rayleigh and Hadleigh (Rayleigh Weir underpass, built 4 December 1989 to early 1992), which is often the start of congestion in the evenings into Southend. After this, the road soon enters into Southend-on-Sea.

In Southend, at the Kent Elms junction with the A1015 Rayleigh Road, there are traffic lights. The A127 changes its name to Prince Avenue. There is a roundabout (the first since Gallows Corner) and a turn-off for a shopping centre (Tesco). The next roundabout is Cuckoo Corner. The exits to the north and east are both the A1159, to London Southend Airport and Thorpe Bay respectively. However, the A127 turns south and becomes Victoria Avenue.

The A127 terminates in the centre of Southend-on-Sea at a junction with the A13 immediately next to Southend Victoria Station.

== History ==
The A127 was designed as the eastern part of a major new road for vehicular traffic between Wanstead and Southend, the other section being the Eastern Avenue (now the A12). It opened in stages between June and September 1924. The road was formally opened by Prince Henry, Duke of Gloucester on 25 March 1925.

Due to initial problems with newly constructed embankments along the line of the road, there were problems with surfacing which subsequently led Clement Attlee to complain that it was "one of the worst pieces of main road in West Essex." The road was not originally dual carriageway, with places being dualled during the 1920s and 1930s. Following concerns about safety, the remainder was dualled in the late 1930s.

During World War II the A127 was used to store army vehicles and equipment prior to the D-Day invasion of Normandy on 6 June 1944.

The Gallows Corner Flyover, providing a free-flow link between Eastern Avenue and Southend Arterial Road, opened as a temporary link in 1969. The eventual assumption was that the flyover would be replaced by the M12 motorway, which was never constructed.

== Future developments ==
=== A127/A1159 Cuckoo Corner & Priory Crescent ===
In 2000 plans were announced to dual an 800 m stretch of the A1159 comprising Priory Crescent and upgrade the Cuckoo Corner junction connecting it to the A127. The road scheme has faced controversy due to its location over the Prittlewell royal Anglo-Saxon burial grave site and environmental loss, and was the site of an anti-road protest camp known as Camp Bling.
