= Thorndon =

Thorndon may refer to:

== People ==
- Giles Thorndon (c.1388–1477), official of the English Crown
- Robin Cooke, Baron Cooke of Thorndon (1926–2006), New Zealand judge and member of the British House of Lords

== Buildings and places ==
New Zealand

- Thorndon, New Zealand, suburb of Wellington

- Thorndon Railway Station, former railway station
- Thorndon School, primary and intermediate school
- Thorndon (New Zealand electorate), New Zealand general electorate

United Kingdom

- Aspall and Thorndon railway station, former railway station on the Mid-Suffolk Light Railway
- Thorndon Hall, Georgian Palladian country house in Ingrave, Essex

- Thorndon Park Chapel, former Roman Catholic private chapel in the grounds of Thorndon Hall

- Thorndon, Suffolk, village and civil parish in Suffolk

== Other ==
- Thorndon Mile, Thoroughbred horse race in Wellington, New Zealand
- Thorndon, a former parliamentary electorate in the city of Wellington, New Zealand,
