= The Viper, Mill Green =

Public house in Mill Green, Essex, England

Coordinates: 51.6908°N 0.3743°E

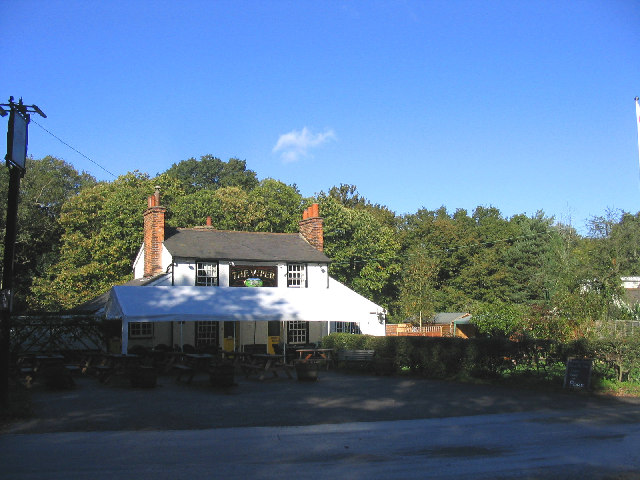
The Viper

The Viper is a public house at The Common, Mill Green, Essex. The building originated as two separate cottages in the mid 19th century, which became a single pub by 1896 at the latest. The lean-to extensions to either side of the building are a 20th-century extension.

In the early 20th century, the building was purchased by Truman's Brewery, at the time the world's largest brewery. With the closure of Truman's Brewery in 1990, the building passed into private ownership.

In 2019 the Viper was purchased by the current owner, Rupert Cherryman, who closed the pub for three years for repairs. The Viper reopened in November 2022.

It is on the Campaign for Real Ale's National Inventory of Historic Pub Interiors, and has been a Grade II listed building since 2019.
