= Mill Green, Essex =

Hamlet in Essex, England

Coordinates: 51.685°N 0.370°E

Mill Green
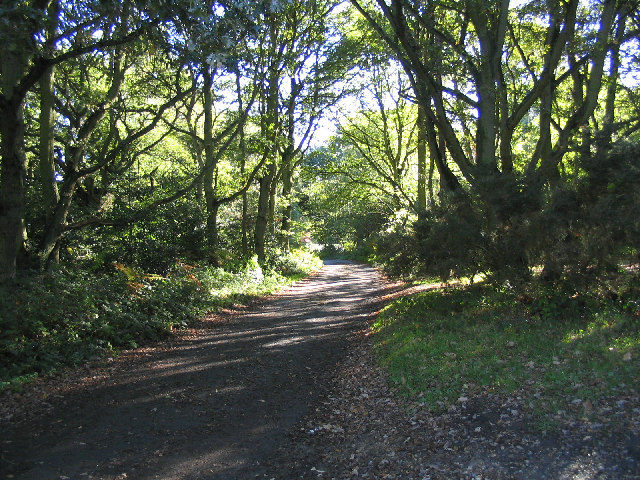
- Stoneymore Woods, Mill Green

- Location within Essex
- Civil parish: Ingatestone and Fryerning
- District: Brentwood
- Shire county: Essex
- Region: East
- Country: England
- Sovereign state: United Kingdom
- Post town: Ingatestone
- Postcode district: CM4
- Dialling code: 01277
- Police: Essex
- Fire: Essex
- Ambulance: East of England

Mill Green is a hamlet in civil parish of Ingatestone and Fryerning, in the Brentwood district, in the English county of Essex. It is near the town of Ingatestone and the village of Fryerning. There is a wood called Millgreen Wood and a mill called Mill Green Mill.

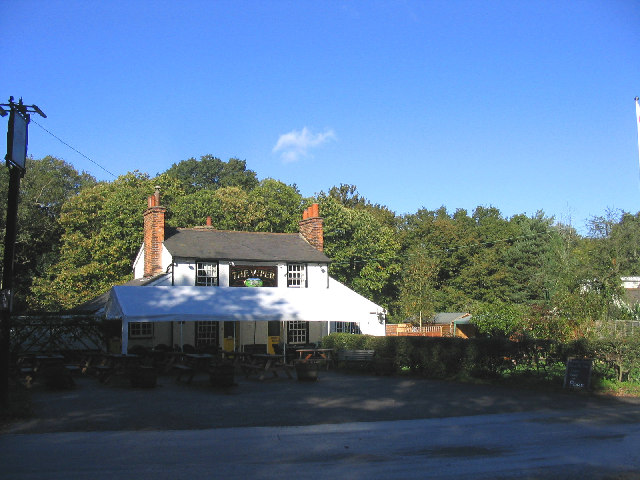
The Viper

The Viper public house at The Common, is on the Campaign for Real Ale's National Inventory of Historic Pub Interiors.
