= A1159 road =

Road in Essex, England

A1159

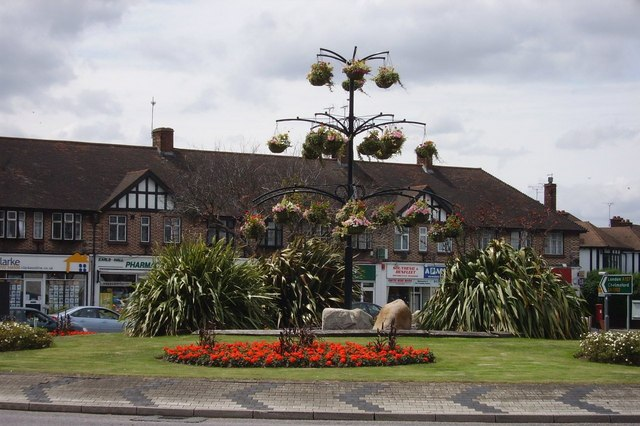
- The roundabout at Cuckoo Corner

Route information
- Length: 3.5 mi (5.6 km)

Major junctions
- Southeast end: Thorpe Bay
- A13 A127
- Northwest end: London Southend Airport

Location
- Country: United Kingdom
- Constituent country: England

Road network
- Roads in the United Kingdom; Motorways; A and B road zones
← A1158	→ A1160

The A1159 road is a short road skirting the north of Southend-on-Sea from Thorpe Bay to London Southend Airport, in the coastal city of Southend-on-Sea, Essex.

== Route ==
The A1159 commences its journey at Bournes Green Roundabout, its junction with the A13. The road heads northwest as Royal Artillery Way, which skirts the northern edge of the Southend urban area. The road then reaches a roundabout, with access to a housing estate to the south, and a leisure centre to the north. The A1159 reaches another roundabout up Eastern Avenue, with Fossetts Way giving access to Fossetts Park Retail Centre and Wellesley Hospital, and Sutton Road giving access to Temple Farm Industrial Estate. We then pass over Prittlewell Station, on the Greater Anglia line from London Liverpool Street to Southend Victoria Station. It then skirts Priory Park to the north as Priory Crescent, before it reaches a junction with the A127. At the junction, the A1159 turns right, becoming the residential road of Manners Way. The road ends at the next roundabout, at the entrance to London Southend Airport. The other roads at the roundabout are unclassified.

== A127/A1159 Cuckoo Corner & Priory Crescent ==
In 2000 plans were announced to dual a 800m stretch of the A1159 comprising Priory Crescent and the Cuckoo Corner junction connecting it to the A127. This plan would, alongside the widening of the road, also included rebuilding of the bridge on which the road crosses the railway line. Preparatory work in 2003 led to the discovery of the Royal Saxon tomb in Prittlewell archaeological remains, a rare example of Anglo-Saxon burial. The road scheme has faced local controversy due to its location over the grave site and the loss of land from the adjoining Priory Park that would occur with its construction. The scheme is opposed by single issue local campaign groups Parklife and Priory Park Preservation Society. Since 2005 it has also been the site of an anti-road protest camp known as Camp Bling. Due to the opposition from local residents and the escalation in costs, the scheme is currently under review. When first proposed in 2000 the scheme was given an estimated cost of £3.5 million, but by 2006 costs had escalated to £20 million and in 2008 the new scheme was estimated at £10.8 million. This reduction in cost is mostly due to the removal of proposals to rebuild the railway bridge from the scheme.

At a meeting held between campaigners and Council members at the end of April 2009 it was announced that the scheme had been abandoned following its failure to receive funding from central government.
