= List of road junctions in the United Kingdom: M =

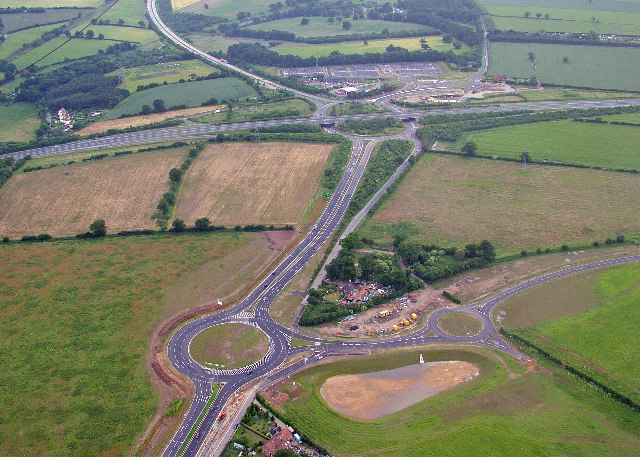
Thickthorn Interchange

This is part of the list of road junctions in the United Kingdom.

Many road junctions are named after pubs. For more information regarding the derivation of pub names see pub names.

== M ==
Junction Name	Type	Location	Roads	Grid Reference	Notes
Magic Roundabout aka The Plough Roundabout	Roundabout	Hemel Hempstead	• St Albans Road (A414) • Two Waters Road (A414) • Station Road (A4146) • Leighton Buzzard Road (A4146) • Lawn Lane • Selden Hill	51°44′46″N 00°28′23″W / 51.74611°N 0.47306°W / 51.74611; -0.47306	
The Magic Roundabout	Roundabout	Cheddar, Somerset	A371 Axbridge Road; B3135 Axbridge Road; Shipham Road	51°17′15″N 2°47′25″W	
The Magic Roundabout: formerly County Islands	Magic Roundabout	Swindon	A4289 (shown on some maps as A4259); A4259 (for A4312); Fleming Way; Shrivenham Road	51°33′46″N 1°46′18″W	
Malden Junction		New Malden, Royal Borough of Kingston	A3 Malden Way; A2043 Malden Road	51°23′40″N 0°15′14″W	
Manadon Junction	Roundabout Interchange	Plymouth	unclass. St Peters Road, N; A386 Tavistock Road, NE; A38 The Parkway, E / W; B3250 Mannamead Road, S; A386 Outland Road, SW	50.4006°N 4.1357°W	
Mandale Interchange		Middlesbrough, North Yorkshire	A19; A1032; A1130	54°32′56″N 1°16′28″W	
Manor Circus		North Sheen, LB Richmond	A316 Lower Mortlake Road; A316 Lower Richmond Road; B353 Manor Road; B353 Sandycombe Road	51°28′04″N 0°17′19″W	
Manor House		Finsbury Park, LB Haringey	A105 Green Lanes; A503 Seven Sisters Road	51°34′13″N 0°05′46″W	
Manor Top		Intake, South Yorkshire	A6102; A6135 (formerly A616)	53°21′39″N 1°25′41″W	
Manorway Junction		Stanford-le-Hope, Thurrock (formerly Essex)	A13; A1013 Stanford Road (formerly A13); A1014 Manorway; B1007	TQ680829	NB. Not officially signed, also known as Stanford Interchange
Manrahead Roundabout		Beith, North Ayrshire	A737; B777; B7049	NS343530	
Marble Arch		City of Westminster	A402 Bayswater Road; A4202 Park Lane (road); A5 Edgware Road; A40 Oxford Street	51°30′47″N 0°09′36″W	Article on the Marble Arch the junction was named after.
Marcham Interchange		Marcham, Oxfordshire	A34; A415	51°40′09″N 1°18′39″W	
Mar Dyke Interchange	Roundabout Interchange	near Aveley and West Thurrock, Thurrock (formerly Essex)	M25 J30; A13; A282; A1306 Arterial Road (J31, former A13); A1090 Stonehouse Lane (J31); Ship Lane (J31); Thurrock Services (J31)	51°29′50″N 0°16′8″E	Name probably only refers to J30 of the M25, the junction with the A13, but feeder roads link to J31. Exit to J31 clockwise must be made via J30, and access from J31 anticlockwise also must be made via J30. However, J30 has its own south-facing slips. A282 now starts immediately after the diverge at J30 clockwise.
Marfleet Roundabout		Marfleet, Kingston upon Hull, East Riding of Yorkshire	A1033 (Hedon Road); Marfleet Lane	53°44′53″N 0°16′31″W	
Marina Roundabout		Eaglestone, Milton Keynes	H8 (A421/B4034) Standing Way; V8 Marlborough Street	52°01′32″N 0°43′56″W	
Market Cross		Cheddar, Somerset	A371 Church Street; A371 Bath Street; B3135 Union Street	51°16′31″N 2°46′36″W	
Markham Moor Roundabout		West Markham, Nottinghamshire	A1; A57; A638; B1164 Great North Road; unclass.	SK719737	
Marks Farm Roundabout		Braintree, Essex	A120; A131; B1256	51°52′53″N 0°35′07″E	
Marks Tey Roundabout	Dumbbell	Marks Tey, Essex	A12; A120 Coggeshall Road; B1408 London Road; Station Road	TL915237	
Marlborough		Stantonbury, Milton Keynes	V7 Saxon Street; V8 Marlborough Street	52°04′0″N 0°46′34″W	
Marr		Marr, South Yorkshire	A635; Church Lane	53°32′29″N 1°13′32″W	
Marton Circle		Great Marton, Lancashire	M55 J4; A583; A5230	SD352335	
Marus Bridge Roundabout		Wigan, Greater Manchester	A49 Warrington Road; B5238 Poolstock Lane; Highfield Grange Avenue	SD567031	
Marylebone Circus		Marylebone, London	A41 Baker Street; A501 Marylebone Road	51.52214°N 0.15749°W	
Maryville Interchange		Glasgow	M73 J1; M74 J4	55°49′53″N 4°05′56″W	webcam
Masbrough Roundabout		Rotherham, South Yorkshire	A630; Masbrough Street; Main Street	53°25′48″N 1°21′53″W	
Mason's Corner	Crossroads	Winchmore Hill, LB Enfield	A105 Green Lanes; A105 Ridge Avenue; Green Dragon Lane; Bush Hill	51°38′11″N 0°05′26″W	
Master Brewer		Hillingdon, LB Hillingdon	A40 Freezeland Way; A437 Long Lane; B466 Long Lane	51°33′14″N 0°26′53″W	
Matford Roundabout		Exeter	A379 Bridge Road; A379 Sannerville Way; A379 to Marsh Barton	50.6912°N 3.5067°W	
Mawgan Cross	Roundabout	Mawgan, near Helston, Cornwall	B3293 to Goonhilly Downs; Gweek Drive to Gweek; Higher Lane to Mawgan	50.0744°N 5.2150°W	
Mayford Roundabout		Woking, Surrey	A320 Egley Road; B380 Guildford Road; B380 Smart's Heath Road	SU996561	
McFarlane Chase Roundabout	Roundabout	Weston-super-Mare, North Somerset	Winterstoke Road; MacFarlane Chase; Old Junction Road	51°20′17.10″N 2°57′23.05″W	
Mclaren Paragon Roundabout		Ottershaw, Surrey	A320 Chertsey Road; A320 Guildford Road; Martyr's Lane	TQ017615	
Mead Cross		Ashburton, Devon	Gale Road; unclass.	SX779712	
Meadowhead		Norton, South Yorkshire	A61 Meadowhead; A61 Chesterfield Road South; A6102 Bochum Parkway; B6054 Greenhill Parkway	53°19′36″N 1°28′25″W	
The Meadows		Sandhurst, Berkshire	A30; A331; A321	SU855599	
Medbourne Roundabout		Medbourne, Milton Keynes	H5 Portway; V3 Fulmer Street	52°01′18″N 0°48′12″W	
Melbury Oak		Melbury Osmond, Dorset	A37; unclass.	50°52′13″N 2°35′48″W	
Mellanvrane Roundabout		Treninnick, Newquay, Cornwall	A392 Gannel Link Road; A392 Trevemper Road; A3058 Trevemper Road; Mellanvrane Lane	SW815607	
Mendip Roundabout	Roundabout	West Wick, Weston-super-Mare, North Somerset	• A370 • Elmham Way • Churchland Way	51°21′9″N 2°54′35″W	Formerly West Wick Roundabout and Locking Castle Roundabout
Merrymeet Roundabout		Whiddon Down, Devon	A30; A382; unclass.	SX697928	
Merstham Interchange	Four Level Stack	Merstham, Surrey	M25 J7; M23 J8	51°15′49″N 0°07′34″W	
Met Office Roundabout	Roundabout	Bracknell	A3095 Warfield Road, NNE; B3022 Park Road, NE; A329 London Road, SE; A3095 Church Road, SSW; unclass. Weather Way, W; A329 Millennium Way, NW	51.4171°N 0.7446°W	Once the site of the Met Office
The Metal Bridge		Todhills, Cumbria	A74; unclass.	54°58′25″N 3°00′30″W	Named after the Metal Bridge pub, itself named after the metal bridge over the River Esk
Miami Roundabout	Roundabout	Chelmsford, Essex	A1114 London Road (formerly A12); A1114 Princes Road (formerly A12); B1007 Wood Street; B1007 Moulsham Street	51°43′19″N 0°27′38″E	Named after the Miami Hotel which is adjacent to the roundabout.
Mickleham Bends Junction		Mickleham, Surrey	A24; B2209	TQ170537	
Midsummer Roundabout		Central Milton Keynes	V6 Grafton Gate; Midsummer Boulevard	52°02′10″N 0°46′14″W	
Milehouse Roundabout		Cross Heath, Staffordshire	A34; B5367	53°1′19.26″N 2°13′49.28″W	
Milestone Green		Mortlake, LB Richmond upon Thames	A205 Upper Richmond Road West; B351 Sheen Lane	51°27′53″N 0°16′01″W	
Milk Bottle		Paignton, Devon	A3022 Torquay Road; Cecil Road		
Mill Hill Circus	Roundabout	Mill Hill, LB Barnet	A1 Watford Way; A5100 The Broadway; Lawrence Street	51°37′00″N 0°14′41″W	
Milton Interchange	Roundabout Interchange	Milton, Cambridgeshire	A14 (formerly A45); A10 Ely Road; A1309 Milton Road (formerly A10); Cambridge Road. (formerly A10)	52°14′16″N 0°09′02″E	
Milton Interchange		Milton, Oxfordshire	A34; A4130; unclass.	51°37′07″N 1°18′11″W	
Minimax Corner		Feltham, LB Hounslow	A312 Fagg's Road; A312 Harlington Road West; A315 Staines Road	51°27′26″N 0°24′37″W	Named after Minimax Limited, a former maker of fire extinguishers that had a factory here.
Mitchams Corner		Cambridge, Cambridgeshire	A1134 Victoria Road (Cambridge Ring Road); A1134 Milton Road (Cambridge Ring Road); A1303 Chesterton Road; Victoria Avenue; Springfield Road; Corona Road; Riverside Court	52°12′51″N 0°7′29″E	western side of gyratory formed by the old Croft Holme Lane
Moby Dick	Crossroads	LB Barking and Dagenham	A12 Eastern Avenue; A1112 Whalebone Lane North	51°34′51″N 0°08′29″E	Named after public house adjacent to junction.
Moira Toll Gate		Moira, Leicestershire	B5003 Shortheath Road; B5003 Ashby Road; B586 Measham Road	52°44′12″N 1°32′05″W	
Moles Interchange	Dual Dumbbell Roundabout Interchange	Ware, Hertfordshire	A10; A1170; Great Cambridge Road	51°49′40″N 0°02′02″W	Junction location is just south of Moles Wood
Mollinsburn Junction	Fork Interchange	Glasgow	M73 J3; A80 Cumbernauld Road	55°55′05″N 4°03′59″W	
Monks Cross		Callington, Cornwall	B3257; unclass.	50.5230°N 4.2812°W	
Monks Heath Crossroads		Monks Heath, Cheshire	A34 Congleton Road; A537 Chelford Road	53°15′50″N 2°14′04″W	
Monkspath Interchange		Monkspath, West Midlands	M42 J4; A34; A3400 (formerly A34)	SP146758	
Monkston Roundabout		Monkston, Milton Keynes	H7 Chaffron Way; V11 (A4146) Tongwell Street	52°02′26″N 0°41′37″W	
Monktonhead Roundabout		Monkton, Ayrshire	A79; A78; unclass.	NS356287	
The Monument		The City of London	A3 King William Street; A10 Gracechurch Street; Cannon Street; Eastcheap	51°30′39″N 0°05′12″W	Named after the Monument to the Great Fire of London at the junction.
Moor Junction: aka Waterside		Longford, LB Hillingdon	A4 Colnbrook Bypass; A3044 Stanwell Moor Road; Speedbird Way	51°29′01″N 0°29′34″W	
Moor Cross		Cornwood, Devon	Bond Street; unclass.	SX609588	
Moor Lane Junction	Crossroads	Worle, North Somerset	B3440 New Bristol Road; Station Road; Moor Lane	51°21′28.41″N 2°55′23.29″W	
Morants Court Cross		Sevenoaks, Kent	A224; B2211	51°18′15″N 0°09′09″E	
Mountbatten Roundabout		Bournemouth-Poole	A3049 Wallisdown Road; A348 Ringwood Road; Francis Avenue	50.754115, -1.932480	Named after the Mountbatten pub
Mount Corner		Hanworth, LB Hounslow	A312 Uxbridge Road; A312 Hampton Road West; A314 Hounslow Road	51°26′26″N 0°23′21″W	
Mount Farm Roundabout		Mount Farm, Milton Keynes	V8 Marlborough Street; Bond Avenue	52°00′43″N 0°43′13″W	
Mount Wise Roundabout		Mount Wise, Newquay, Cornwall	A392 Gannel Link Road; B3282 Mount Wise; B3282 Higher Tower Road; Pentire Road	SW804614	
Mounthooly Roundabout		Aberdeen	A96 West North Street; A944 Hutcheon Street; B990 Nelson Terrace	NJ940070	
Movers Lane		Barking, LB Barking and Dagenham	A13 Alfreds Way; Movers Lane; River Road	51°31′50″N 0°05′32″E	
Muckley Corner		Lichfield	A5 Watling Street; A461 Walsall Road; Hall Lane	52°39′22″N 1°52′54″W	
Mullacott Cross	Roundabout	West Down, Devon	A361; A3123; B3343 to Woolacombe	51.1794°N 4.1312°W	
Mumps Roundabout		Oldham, Greater Manchester	A62; A669; B6477	53°32′35″N 2°06′05″W	
Mushroom Roundabout		Rotherham, South Yorkshire	A630; A6123	53°26′32″N 1°19′19″W	
Musley Bank		Malton, North Yorkshire	A64; B1248	SE769706	
