= Camp Bling =

Former road protest camp in Southend-on-Sea, England

Coordinates: 51.5540°N 0.7088°E

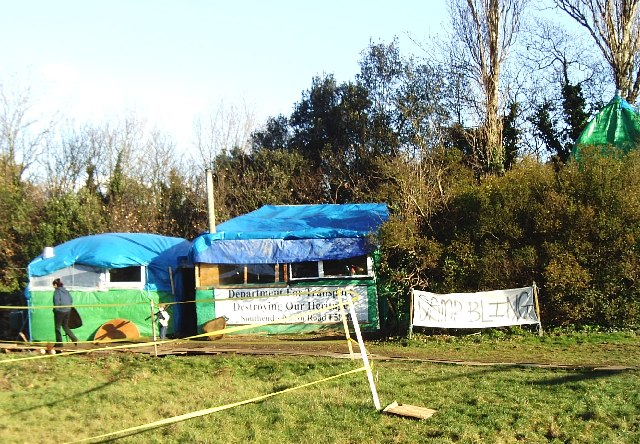
Camp Bling, Priory Crescent, Southend-on-Sea

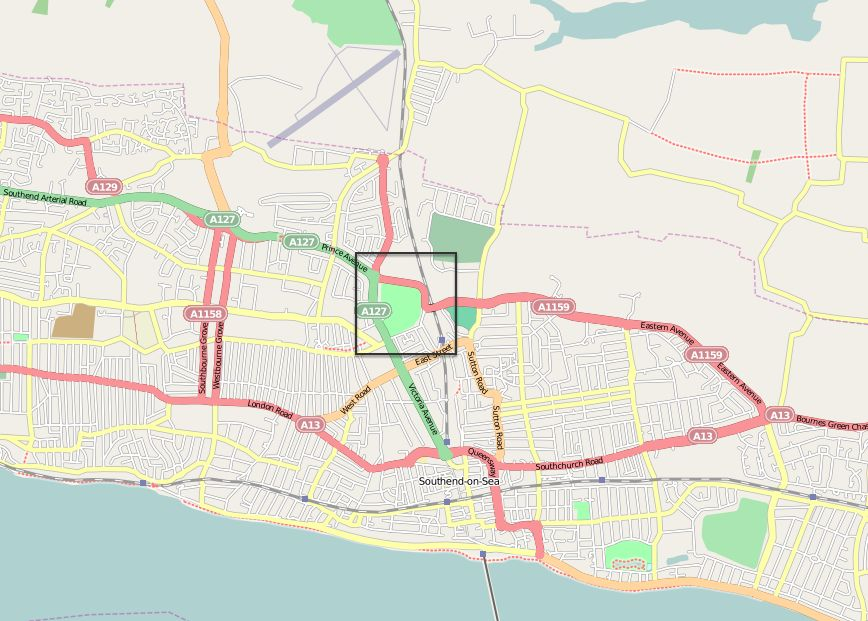
Location of the Priory Crescent road widening scheme

Camp Bling was a UK-based road protest camp set up in Southend-on-Sea, Essex in September 2005, to obstruct a £25 million plan to widen the Priory Crescent section of the A1159 road over the Royal Saxon tomb in Prittlewell. In April 2009, the authority announced that plans to build the road had been abandoned and the camp was disbanded in July 2009.

== History ==
A 'Blinger' enjoying his tea

In 2004, Southend-on-Sea Borough Council proposed the 'Priory Crescent road widening scheme' and a public inquiry was held. The council proceeded with the scheme, estimated at £25 million, explaining that it was important to Southend and that a democratic decision had been taken after considering opposing views. During early excavations, an Anglo-Saxon king's burial chamber was discovered which was described by British archaeologists as "the most spectacular discovery of its kind made during the past 60 years".

The widening of the road would have resulted in the felling of 111 trees and a loss of 300 square metres (3,200 sq ft) of public green space. 20,000 signatories completed petitions against the road.

Of those responding to the official Winter 2001 Civic News survey, only 16 people were in favour of the proposals from a delivery area covering all Southend households.

On 23 April 2009, at a meeting with the council the authority told the protesters that the road widening scheme had been abandoned, and the protesters agreed to leave within 3 months.

== The camp ==
The camp was situated between a main road and a railway line. The site consisted of a large communal area, a visitors centre and several personal dwellings. All buildings were made from re-cycled materials. The communal area featured a kitchen, seating, heating and a bookcase. The buildings were heated by wood burning fires and run off donated wood. Water was collected on a daily basis. Food was cooked on a calor gas oven and there was a composting toilet. A wind generator provided some of the evening lighting. The visitors centre displayed information about protest camps, trees, how to build a compost toilet, how to make a bender shelter to live in etc and all visitors were welcome to look around.

== See also ==
- Prittlewell royal Anglo-Saxon burial
