= Thorndon Park Chapel =

Coordinates: 51.5987°N 0.3301°E

Thorndon Park Chapel (The Petre Chapel)
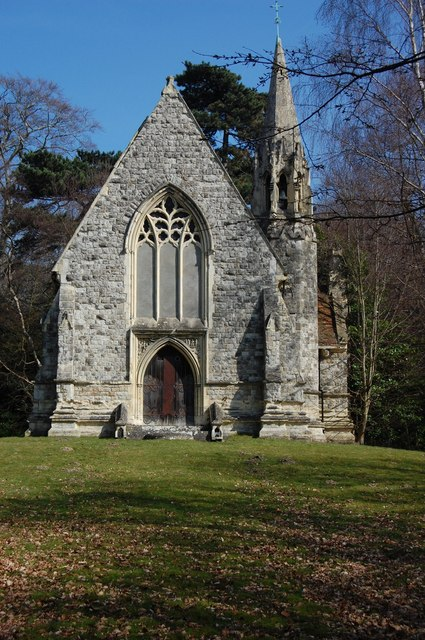
- West end of Thorndon Park Chapel

- Location in Essex
- OS grid reference: TQ 615 914
- Location: Thorndon Park, near Ingrave, Essex
- Country: England
- Denomination: Roman Catholic
- Website: Historic Chapels Trust

History
- Status: Private chapel
- Founder: Lord Petre
- Dedicated: 1857

Architecture
- Functional status: Redundant
- Heritage designation: Grade II*
- Designated: 20 February 1976
- Architect: William Wardell
- Architectural type: Chapel
- Style: Gothic Revival

Specifications
- Materials: Ragstone with freestone dressings, tiled roofs

Thorndon Park Chapel (The Petre Chapel) is a former Roman Catholic private chapel situated in Thorndon Park, near the grounds of Thorndon Hall near Ingrave, Essex, England. It is recorded in the National Heritage List for England as a designated Grade II* listed building, and is under the care of the Historic Chapels Trust.

== History ==
The chapel was built as a private chantry chapel and mausoleum for the Roman Catholic Petre family who lived in Thorndon Hall. It was built in about 1850, and dedicated in 1857. The architect was William Wardell. Having become redundant and subject to decay and deterioration, the chapel was given to the Trust by Lord Petre in 2010.

== Architecture ==
Constructed in Kentish ragstone with freestone dressings, the chapel has a tiled roof. Its architectural style is Decorated. The plan of the chapel is L-shaped in three bays, with a vestry and a bellcote on the south side. On the sides of the chapel are buttresses and two-light windows. At the west end is an arched doorway, with carvings in the spandrels, above which is a large three-light window containing curvilinear tracery. The east window is similar. The bellcote is attached to the south wall and consists of an octagonal stair turret, an octagonal highly decorated bell stage with lancet bell openings, and a pyramidal roof. Inside the church is an elaborately decorated roof, including gilded angels. Around the walls of the chapel are the Stations of the Cross on stone panels. The stone altar is integrated into the east wall, with a richly carved reredos above it. Some of the stained glass was made by Hardman, but has been moved into storage.

== See also ==
- List of chapels preserved by the Historic Chapels Trust
