= Fryerning Mill =

Windmill in Mill Green, Essex, England

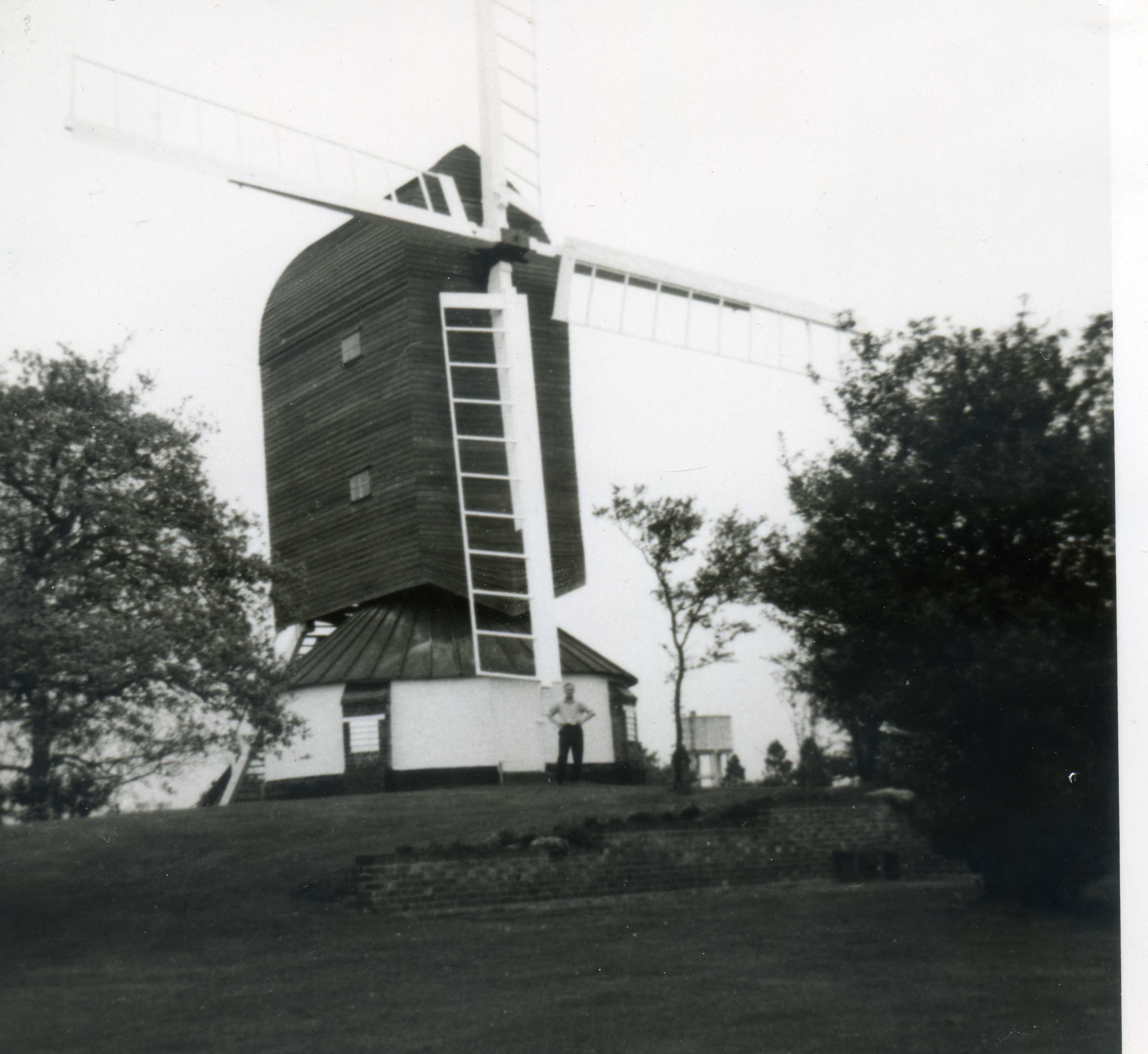
- Fryerning Mill in 1965

Origin
- Mill name: Mill Green Mill
- Grid reference: TL 640 008
- Coordinates: 51.681°N 0.371°E
- Operator(s): Private
- Year built: 1759

Information
- Purpose: Corn mill
- Type: Post mill
- Roundhouse storeys: Single storey roundhouse
- No. of sails: Four sails
- Type of sails: Two Spring Patent sails and two Spring sails
- Windshaft: Cast iron
- Winding: Tailpole
- No. of pairs of millstones: Two pairs
- Size of millstones: Head stones 4 feet 6 inches (1.37 m), tail stones 4 feet (1.22 m)
- Other information: Rebuilt 1959

Fryerning Mill (or Mill Green Mill) is a grade II* listed post mill at Mill Green, Fryerning, Essex, which has been restored.

== History ==
Mill Green Mill was built in 1759, replacing an earlier mill which stood some 80 yards (73 m) to the east during the period 1564–1731. The mill was built by Robert Barker, a millwright from Chelmsford. A roundhouse was included from the start. The mill was owned by the Petre estate and records of expenditure on the mill are in the Essex Record Office.

In July or August 1774, a farmer was killed by being struck by the sails of the mill. New sails were fitted in 1802 and 1806, and a new stock in 1821. An accident at the mill resulted in the miller sustaining a fractured thigh in 1852, and the owner of the mill being reported to have been carried round on the sails for ten or twelve revolutions before he was rescued. The roof of the mill was repaired in 1878 and the mill re-tarred. A new sail was fitted in 1884 and a new pair of sails in 1902. The mill was working until at least 1905.

Some repairs were done to the body of the mill in the 1930s. The mill was restored in 1959 by R.F. Collinson, who had bought the mill house and discovered the mill in the garden. This entailed the complete replacement of the frame of the mill, including the crowntree. On 2 January 1976, the sails ran away in a gale and the brake wheel disintegrated. A new brake wheel was constructed in 1989.

== Description ==
Mill Green Mill is a post mill with a single-storey roundhouse. The mill is winded by a tailpole. It has two spring sails and two spring patents. There are two pairs of millstones arranged head and tail.

=== Trestle and roundhouse ===
The trestle is of oak, with the main post thought to be of sweet chestnut. The crosstrees are 24 ft (7.32 m) long, 12 in (305 mm) square at the ends, thickening to 15 in (381 mm) by 13 in (330 mm) at the centre. The underside of the lower crosstree is 3 ft 4 in (1.02 m) above ground level. The main post is nearly 23 ft (7.01 m) in length, 25 in (635 mm) square at its base and 22 in (559 mm) diameter at the top. The quarterbars are 12 in (305 mm) by 10 in (254 mm) in section. The roundhouse is of brick, with a boarded roof covered in tarred felt.

=== Body ===
The body of the mill measures 15 ft (4.57 m) by 11 ft (3.35 m) in plan. The crowntree is 23 in (584 mm) by 21 in (533 mm) in section. It has a cast-iron plate bolted to its underside, with a pintle projecting downwards that fits into a cast-iron pot on the top of the main post, a reversal of the normal fitting. The side girts are 10 in (254 mm) by 19 inches (483 mm) in section.

=== Sails and windshaft ===
As originally built, the mill would have had a wooden windshaft and four common sails. The windshaft is of cast iron, probably replacing a former wooden one. It is 18 ft (5.49 m) long and carries the head and tail wheels. The mill has two spring sails and two spring patents. The sails have a span of 58 ft (17.68 m).

=== Machinery ===
The head wheel is of clasp arm construction, it is 9 ft (2.74 m) diameter. It has an iron segment ring bolted on which has a total of 120 teeth. It drive a cast-iron stone nut, with 20 cogs. Originally, the head wheel had 69 cogs, of 4½ in (114 mm) pitch. The tail wheel is also of clasp arm construction, 7 ft (2.13 m) diameter. It has an iron segment ring bolted on which has a total of one hundred teeth. It drives a cast-iron stone nut, with fifteen cogs. Both wheels were made from elm. The headstones are 4 ft 6 in (1.37 m) diameter and the tailstones are 4 ft (1.22 m) diameter.

== Millers ==
Millers who worked this mill were:

- Dearman 1759–?
- John Dearman ?–1852
- Alfred Tuck 1855–66
- James Nicholls 1866–99
- Rankin 1899–1905
