= A128 road =

Road in Essex, England

A128

Route information
- Length: 16.8 mi (27.0 km)

Major junctions
- Southern end: A13, Orsett
- A127 A1023
- Northern end: A414, Chipping Ongar

Location
- Country: United Kingdom
- Constituent country: England
- Primary destinations: Chipping Ongar, Kelvedon Hatch, Brentwood, Ingrave, Bulphan, Orsett

Road network
- Roads in the United Kingdom; Motorways; A and B road zones

The A128 is an A-road in Essex, England.

The road is approximately 16.8 miles (27.0 km) long and it runs from Orsett, at its southern origin, to Chipping Ongar at its north end.

== Route ==
At its southern end, the A128 originates as an exit from the Stanford-le-Hope bypass of the A13 near Orsett, where it is named Brentwood Road. Continuing north, the road is named Tilbury Road as it meets the A127 at the Halfway House junction near West Horndon.

As the road continues in a northbound direction, motorists pass through the villages of Herongate and Ingrave (where the A128 becomes known as Ingrave Road) before a junction at the eastern end of Brentwood High Street. At this double mini-roundabout, called Wilsons Corner, drivers can turn onto the A1023, westbound towards Brentwood or eastbound towards Shenfield. North bound from Wilsons Corner, the A128 becomes known as the Ongar Road for the next 6.5 miles (10.5 km), and passes through Pilgrims Hatch and Kelvedon Hatch.

The final stretch of the A128 at its northern end is the High Street of Chipping Ongar, locally known simply as Ongar. It terminates at the Four Wantz roundabout where motorists can take either the A414 (westbound towards Harlow or eastbound for Chelmsford) or the B184 toward Fyfield.

== Sources ==
- Google Maps
