= A1011 road =

Road in East London, England

Coordinates: 51.5486°N 0.0410°E

A1011

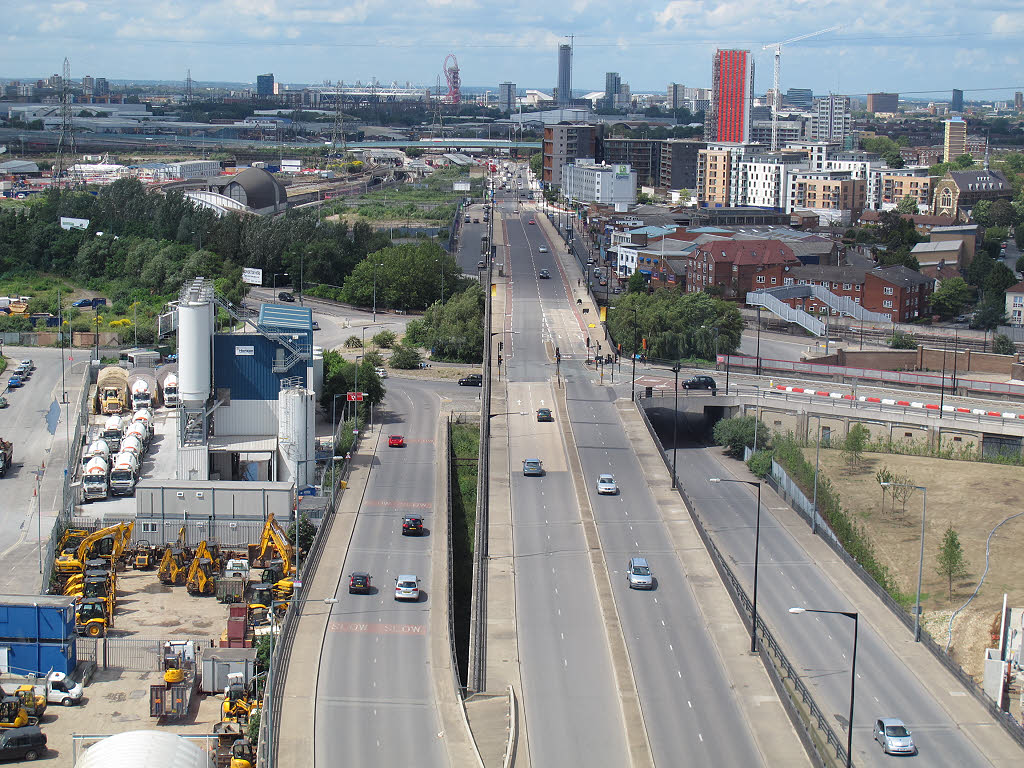
- A1011 Silvertown Way, on a flyover across the Tidal Basin Roundabout, what will be the northern terminus of the Silvertown Tunnel

Route information
- Length: 2.5 mi (4.0 km)

Major junctions
- South end: Stratford
- A112 A124; A13 A1020
- East end: Silvertown

Location
- Country: United Kingdom
- Primary destinations: West Ham Canning Town

Road network
- Roads in the United Kingdom; Motorways; A and B road zones
← A1010	→ A1012

The A1011 is a road in East London, England which links Stratford with Canning Town, and Silvertown.

== Route ==
=== Canning Town interchange ===
The Canning Town interchange is a major interchange where the road meets the A13 and the A124 road. The interchange also consists of the Canning Town bus station and Canning Town station, which is on the Jubilee line to Stratford, Central London and Stanmore. The DLR also stops here as 3 branches meet with services to Bank station, Tower Gateway DLR station, Poplar, Beckton, Custom House, London City Airport, Woolwich Arsenal station, Stratford station and Stratford International station.

== Future ==
=== Silvertown Tunnel ===
The Silvertown Tunnel opened on 7 April 2025, linking Silvertown in east London to the Greenwich Peninsula. Both the Silvertown and Blackwall tunnels are tolled.

=== Royal Docks corridor ===
There are also plans for Silvertown Way and North Woolwich Road.
