= Ingrave =

Village in Essex, England

Coordinates: 51.602°N 0.345°E

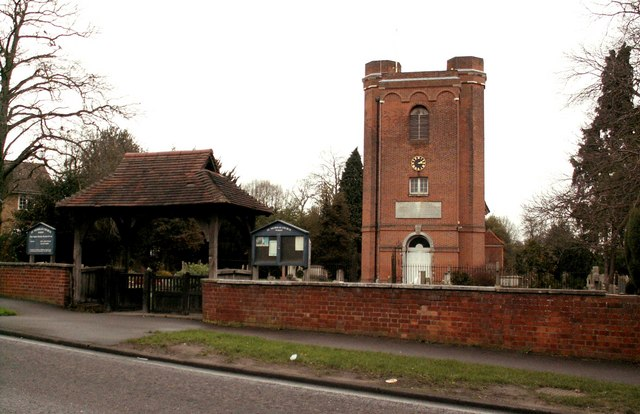
- St Nicholas' Church

- Location within Essex
- OS grid reference: TQ623919
- Civil parish: Herongate and Ingrave
- District: Brentwood
- Shire county: Essex
- Region: East
- Country: England
- Sovereign state: United Kingdom
- Post town: BRENTWOOD
- Postcode district: CM13
- Dialling code: 01277
- Police: Essex
- Fire: Essex
- Ambulance: East of England
- UK Parliament: Brentwood and Ongar

Ingrave is a village in the civil parish of Herongate and Ingrave, in the Brentwood district in Essex, England. It is situated on and around the A128 road, 2 miles (3 km) south-east of the centre of Brentwood. It now forms a single built up area with the adjoining village of Herongate to the south.

== History ==
The name Ingrave means the place of Ralph's people. In the Domesday Book of 1086 there were three estates or manors at a vill listed as Inga in the Barstable Hundred of Essex. Two of the manors were owned by a Ranulf. The manors in the area subsequently consolidated into a manor called "Ging Ralph", which name evolved into Ingrave.

No church or priest is mentioned in the Domesday Book at Ingrave, but it came to be a parish. The original centre of the settlement was around the manor house of Ingrave Hall, to the north-east of the modern village, with the medieval parish church of St Nicholas alongside it.

In 1712, Ingrave was united with the neighbouring parish of West Horndon for ecclesiastical purposes, although they remained separate parishes for civil purposes. In 1734 a new parish church, also dedicated to St Nicholas, was built on Brentwood Road in Ingrave, in a location more central to the growing village, after which the medieval churches of both Ingrave and West Horndon were demolished. The new church was funded by Robert Petre of Thorndon Hall (then just over the parish boundary in West Horndon), who owned most of the land in both Ingrave and West Horndon.

When elected parish and district councils were established in 1894, Ingrave was included in the Billericay Rural District. In 1934, the rural district and civil parish were both abolished. The area of Ingrave parish was then absorbed into the urban district of Brentwood. At the 1931 census (the last before the abolition of the civil parish), Ingrave had a population of 692.

Ingrave has been administered as part of Brentwood since 1934. The area became unparished when the urban district was enlarged to become the modern Brentwood district in 1974. A new civil parish called Herongate and Ingrave was created in 2003 from part of the unparished area, providing an additional tier of local government for that area. The new parish also includes Herongate, which lies immediately south of Ingrave village. The two villages are now classed as a single built up area by the Office for National Statistics, which calls the built up area "Ingrave and Herongate".
