= Herongate and Ingrave =

- Civil parish
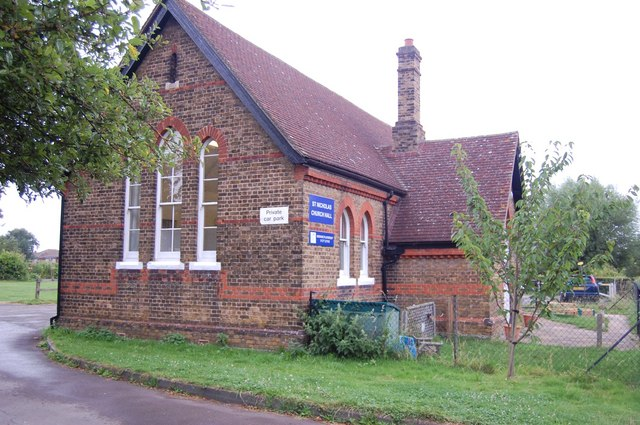
- St Nicholas Church Hall, Ingrave: Meeting place of the parish council
- Interactive map of Herongate and Ingrave
- Coordinates: 51.600°N 0.347°E
- Primary council: Brentwood
- County: Essex
- Region: East of England
- Status: Parish

Government
  - UK Parliament: Brentwood and Ongar

Population (2021)
  - Total: 2,160
- Website: Herongate and Ingrave Parish Council

Herongate and Ingrave is a civil parish in the Brentwood borough in Essex, England. The parish was formed on 1 April 2003 from part of the unparished area of Brentwood.

The parish includes the villages of Ingrave and Herongate and surrounding rural areas. The two villages have now merged to form a single built up area, which the Office for National Statistics calls "Ingrave and Herongate". At the 2021 census the parish had a population of 2,160 and the built up area had a population of 1,923.

Herongate and Ingrave Parish Council meets at St Nicholas Church Hall in Ingrave.
