= Herongate =

Village in Essex, England

Coordinates: 51.59°N 0.35°E

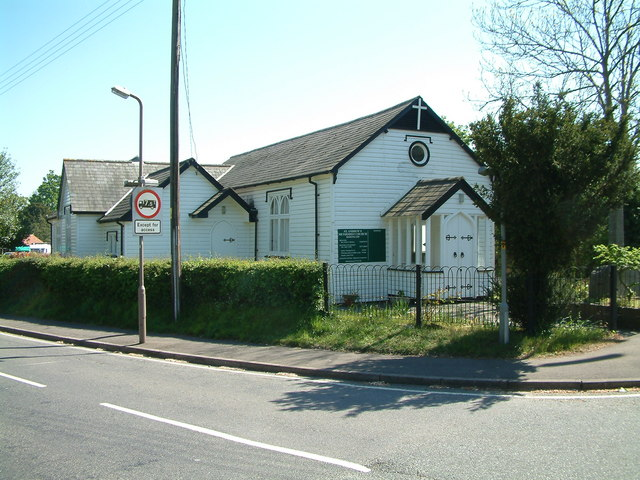
- St Andrew's Methodist Church

- Location within Essex
- OS grid reference: TQ632908
- Civil parish: Herongate and Ingrave
- District: Brentwood
- Shire county: Essex
- Region: East
- Country: England
- Sovereign state: United Kingdom
- Post town: BRENTWOOD
- Postcode district: CM13
- Dialling code: 01277
- Police: Essex
- Fire: Essex
- Ambulance: East of England
- UK Parliament: Brentwood and Ongar

Herongate is a village in the civil parish of Herongate and Ingrave, in the Brentwood district, in south Essex, England. The village is situated on the A128 road between Brentwood and West Horndon.

== History ==
Herongate goes back to the Saxon period, The Anglo-Saxon and medieval settlements were devoted to arable and livestock farming. Herongate was part of the parish of East Horndon; the tradition that the name derived from a heronry there is apocryphal, and it probably derives from the Heron family who held Heron Hall into the fourteenth century.

The manor is mentioned in 1232 as 'Fyndegod(s)hurne' and in 1379 as 'Herne'. By the late 14th century it was owned by Sir William Heron, who left the manor on his death to his daughter Margaret who was married to James Tyrell. The manor continued to be held by the Tyrells, an important Essex family, until at least the late 17th century. In the 16th century the messuage (estate) is recorded as including "100 acres of arable, 200 acres of pasture, 60 of wood and 40 of meadow".

The Heron family held Heron Hall until it was taken over by the Tyrells, as a result of marriage, and the Tyrell family were leading members of local society down to the seventeenth century. Heron Hall was pulled down about 1790.

The present 18th-century Heron Hall is Grade II listed.

== Heron Hall Moat ==
The moated site immediately east of Heron Hall is one of the best known examples of moated sites in Essex. The site, with its surviving brick revetting and tower bases together with its known historical background, illustrates the very grand and possibly defensive nature of the site and reflects the wealth and social standing of its inhabitants.

== Marengo, Napoleon's War Horse ==
Marengo, one of Napoleon Bonaparte's war horses, was captured in 1815 at the Battle of Waterloo by William Petre, 11th Baron Petre.

Petre brought the horse back to the Ingatestone Hall, and the Herongate estate which the Petre family owned, so it is thought likely Lord Petre would have ridden Marengo through the village and perhaps stabled Marengo outside the Boar's Head in Herongate as local legend states, and sold him on to Lieutenant-Colonel Angerstein of the Grenadier Guards.

Marengo's skeleton can still be seen at the National Army Museum in Chelsea.

== Herongate Historic Pubs ==
The Boar's Head is a Grade II listed country pub overlooking the village pond close to Button Common. It started life as three Tudor cottages and first became licensed premises in the 18th century, once part of the Heron Hall Estate owned by one of the county's most influential and ancient families, the Tyrells, but The Boar's Head pub sign still retains the Tyrell crest, a boar's head holding a peacock's feather in its mouth. The family boasted many noted parliamentarians and close servants to the Crown in the 14th and 15th centuries, the Boar’s Head originally comprised three Tudor cottages, forming a group with other buildings around the village pond, it first became a licensed inn in the 18th century serving the small village community.
