= Ingatestone and Fryerning =

- Civil parish
- Coat of arms
- Interactive map of Ingatestone and Fryerning
- Coordinates: 51°40′35″N 0°21′53″E
- Country: England
- Primary council: Brentwood
- County: Essex
- Region: East of England
- Status: Parish
- Main settlements: Ingatestone, Fryerning

Government
  - Type: Parish Council
  - UK Parliament: Brentwood and Ongar

Population (2021)
  - Total: 4,927
- Website: Ingatestone and Fryerning Parish Council

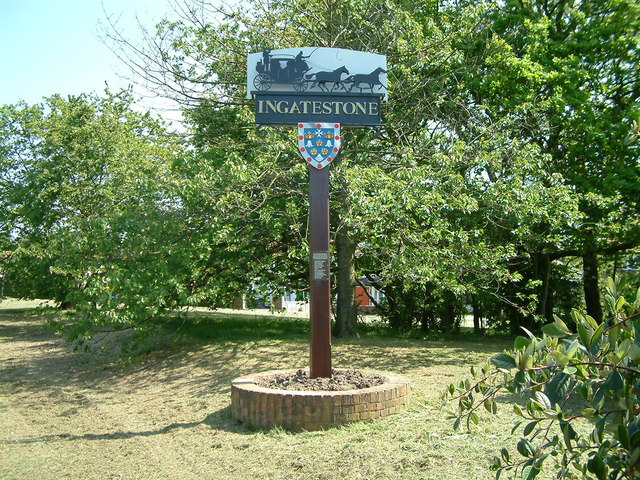
Ingatestone Sign

Ingatestone and Fryerning is a civil parish in the Brentwood borough of Essex, England. The parish includes the villages of Ingatestone and Fryerning and surrounding rural areas. At the 2021 census the parish had a population of 4,927.

== History ==
Fryerning and Ingatestone were historically two separate parishes. They had complicated boundaries with each other. The built up area of Ingatestone straddled the parish boundary, which ran along the main street through much of the village. Ingatestone parish also had a large detached rural exclave to the north of Fryerning parish. The two parishes were merged by the Fryerning and Ingatestone Order 1888 into a new civil parish called Ingatestone and Fryerning.

On 1 October 1950 some land around Handley Green was moved to the parish of Margaretting, and at the same time an area to the south-west of Margaretting Hall was added to Ingatestone and Fryerning.

== Governance ==
There are three tiers of local government covering Ingatestone and Fryerning, at parish, district, and county level: Ingatestone and Fryerning Parish Council, Brentwood Borough Council, and Essex County Council. The parish council is based at 4 The Limes in the centre of Ingatestone.

When elected parish and district councils were established in 1894, the parish was given a parish council and included in the Chelmsford Rural District. The parish was transferred to Brentwood district in 1974.

=== Activities ===
The parish council is responsible for a range of local amenities with the villages:

- Fryerning cemetery
- Closed churchyard in Ingatestone
- Fairfield recreation ground, including provision of play equipment
- Sports pavilion at Seymour Field recreation ground
- Management of sports facilities at Seymour Field, and provision of BMX track
- Provision of bus shelters
- Organisation of village events, including Victorian-themed Christmas evening
- Examining and responding to all planning applications within the parish
- Provision of village signs
- Operation of allotments
- Proposing parking restrictions within parish
