= A13 road (England) =

Major road in England

A13

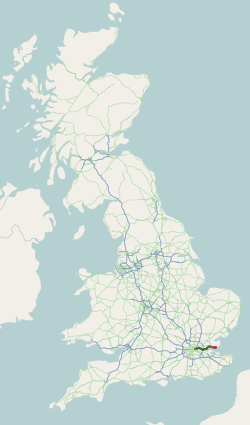

Route information
- Length: 41.7 mi (67.1 km)
- History: Route pre-dates inception of 1922 Roads list; first all-new bypass section opened 1924; last all-new section opened 1999; latest grade-separation completed 2013

Major junctions
- West end: A11 in Whitechapel, London
- A12 / A102 in Poplar, London A406 / A1020 near Barking M25 / A282 near Aveley A1089 near Grays A130 near South Benfleet A127 in Southend-on-Sea
- East end: Ness Road / Campfield Road in Shoeburyness

Location
- Country: United Kingdom
- Constituent country: England
- Primary destinations: Docklands, Barking, Dartford Crossing, Tilbury, Basildon, Southend

Road network
- Roads in the United Kingdom; Motorways; A and B road zones
← A12	→ A14

The A13 is a major road in England linking Central London with east London and south Essex. Its route is similar to that of the London, Tilbury and Southend line via Rainham, Grays, Tilbury, Stanford-Le-Hope & Pitsea, and runs the entire length of the northern Thames Gateway area, terminating on the Thames Estuary at Shoeburyness. It is a trunk road between London and the Tilbury junction, a primary route between there and Sadlers Hall Farm near South Benfleet, and a non-primary route between there and Shoeburyness.

== Route ==
=== London ===
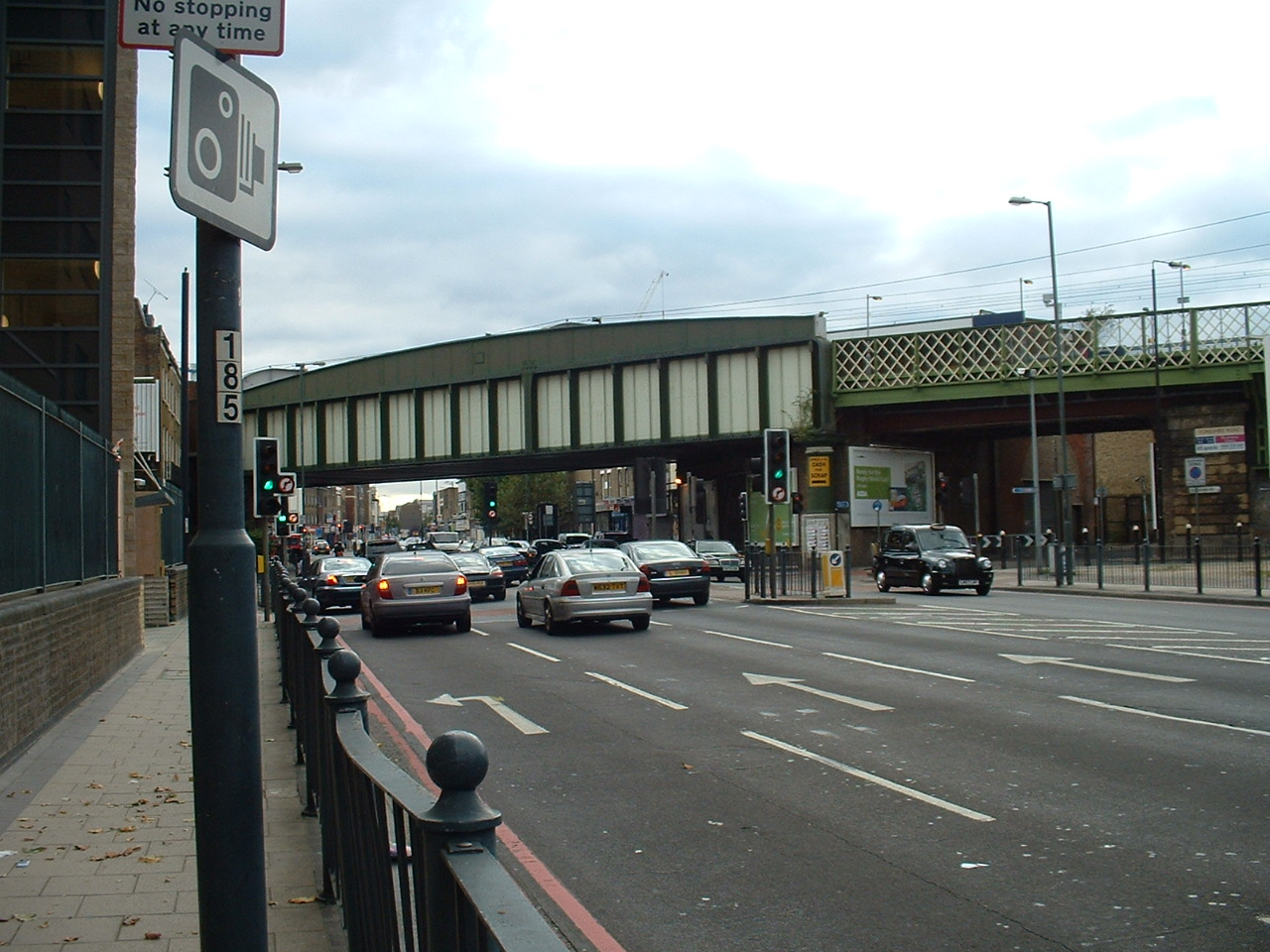
Commercial Road looking west near Limehouse railway station

The A13 used to start at Aldgate Pump; but now begins at the junction with the A11 at what used to be the Aldgate one way system in east London and heads eastwards through the boroughs of Tower Hamlets, Newham, Barking & Dagenham and Havering before reaching the Greater London boundary.

==== Commercial Road and East India Dock Road ====
At the central London end, Commercial Road and East India Dock Road form one of two main arteries through the historic East End (the other being the A11 Whitechapel Road). The A13 route is a relatively recent addition to London's radial network, having been built at the beginning of the 19th century to connect the city with the (then) newly expanding Port of London. Commercial Road dates from 1802, while East India Dock Road was set out from 1806 to 1812. The first iron bridge across the River Lea was built in 1810. Today the route is still largely single carriageway, though notable is the junction with the A12 and A102 at the northern portal of the Blackwall Tunnel. This section of A13 is used by the important London Bus routes 15 (as far as Blackwall) and 115.

==== East Ham & Barking By-pass (Newham Way and Alfreds Way) ====
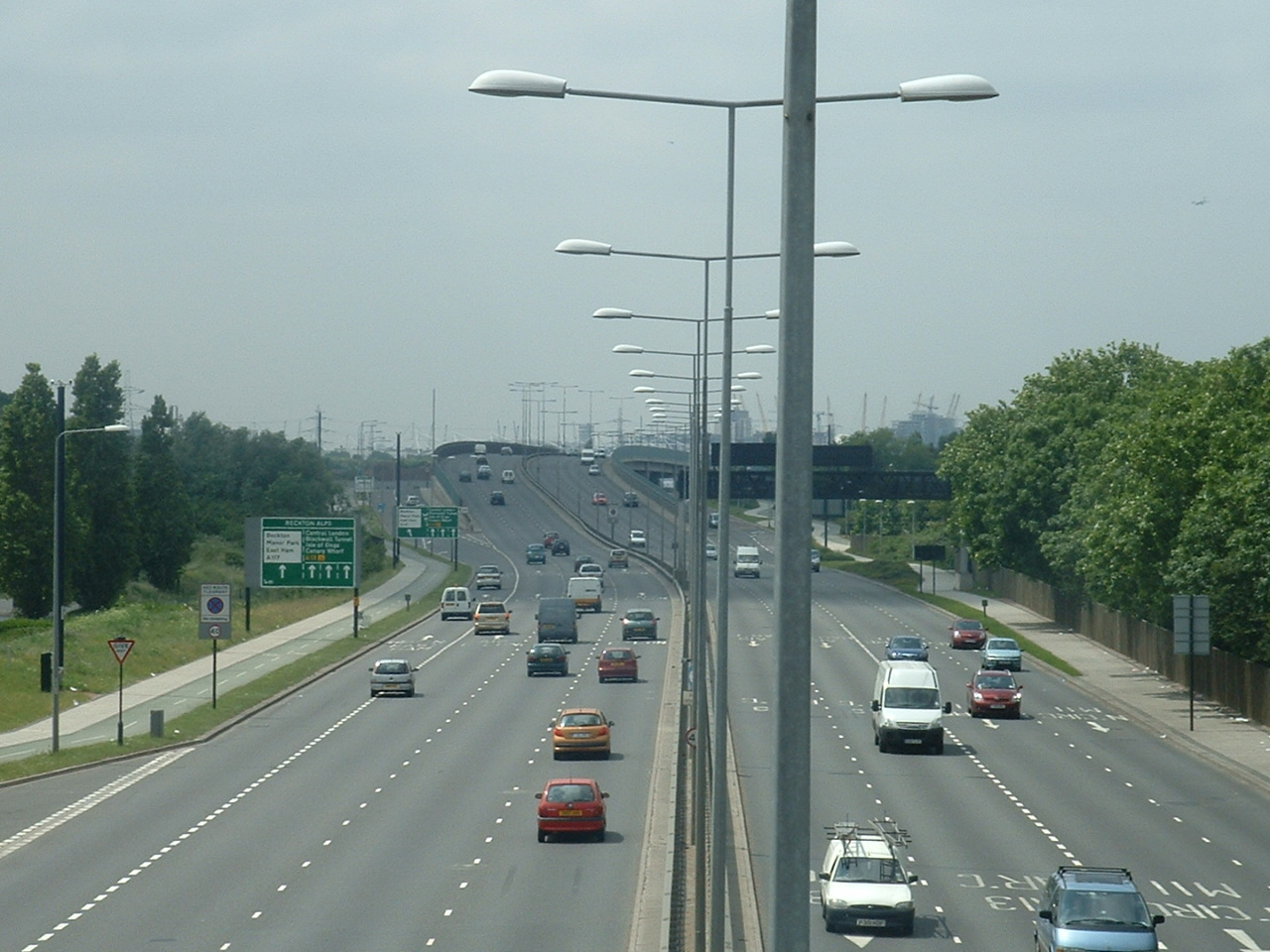
Newham Way looking west between A406 and A117 junctions (the latter just ahead)

However, just east of Blackwall, at the crossing of the River Lea, there is a TOTSO (turn-off to stay on) with the A1261 East India Dock Link Tunnel, and the road changes character dramatically, becoming a dual three-lane expressway. This grade-separated route continues all the way to the Greater London Boundary. Notable junctions include Canning Town, and the A406 junction near Beckton, as well as the single carriageway Lodge Avenue flyover near Barking, where the old A13 route (Ripple Road) merges with the new. Grade-separated in 2002–2004, the dual carriageway section through Newham is Newham Way, while through Barking it is Alfreds Way, both comprising the East Ham & Barking Bypass, and originally dualled by the 1960s. This section is structurally sound and built to high standards, but was subject to a 40 mph (64 km/h) speed limit. Prior to grade-separation, the speed limit was 50 mph (80 km/h). Works involved inserting new underpasses at Prince Regent and Movers Lane, a new flyover at Beckton Alps, and expanding Canning Town flyover from two lanes either way to three. Also inserted was the free-flow link to the A1261 tunnel. London Bus route 173 is the only route to use the A13 here, between Beckton Alps and Ripple Road. However, the speed limit was increased back to 50 mph in 2011.

==== Ripple Road and the Thames Gateway ====
East of the Lodge Avenue junction near Barking, the route then takes over the much older Ripple Road, with its last at-grade junction at Renwick Road, while the all-new grade-separated section east of the Goresbrook Interchange at Dagenham is termed the Thames Gateway, completed in 1999. This is notable for the award-winning viaduct over Fords works, opening in late 1999, and the causeway over Rainham and Wennington Marshes, the latter structure causing some delay to the project due to necessary studies on its environmental impact, although this section opened first, in mid-1997. The contract also included the Wennington to M25 motorway section (see below). It has National Speed Limit from just east of Goresbrook Interchange. London Bus routes 173 and 287 are the only routes to use the A13 here, between Ripple Road and Goresbrook.

There are some public artworks along this section. Between 1997 and 2004 Barking and Dagenham Council commissioned the A13 Artscape project including lighting at the Charlton Crescent subway and cone sculptures at the Goresbrook Interchange. Also in 2005, Havering Council commissioned the Litmus Towers sculptures on the A13 junctions near Rainham which display local environmental data using large LED arrays.

=== Essex ===
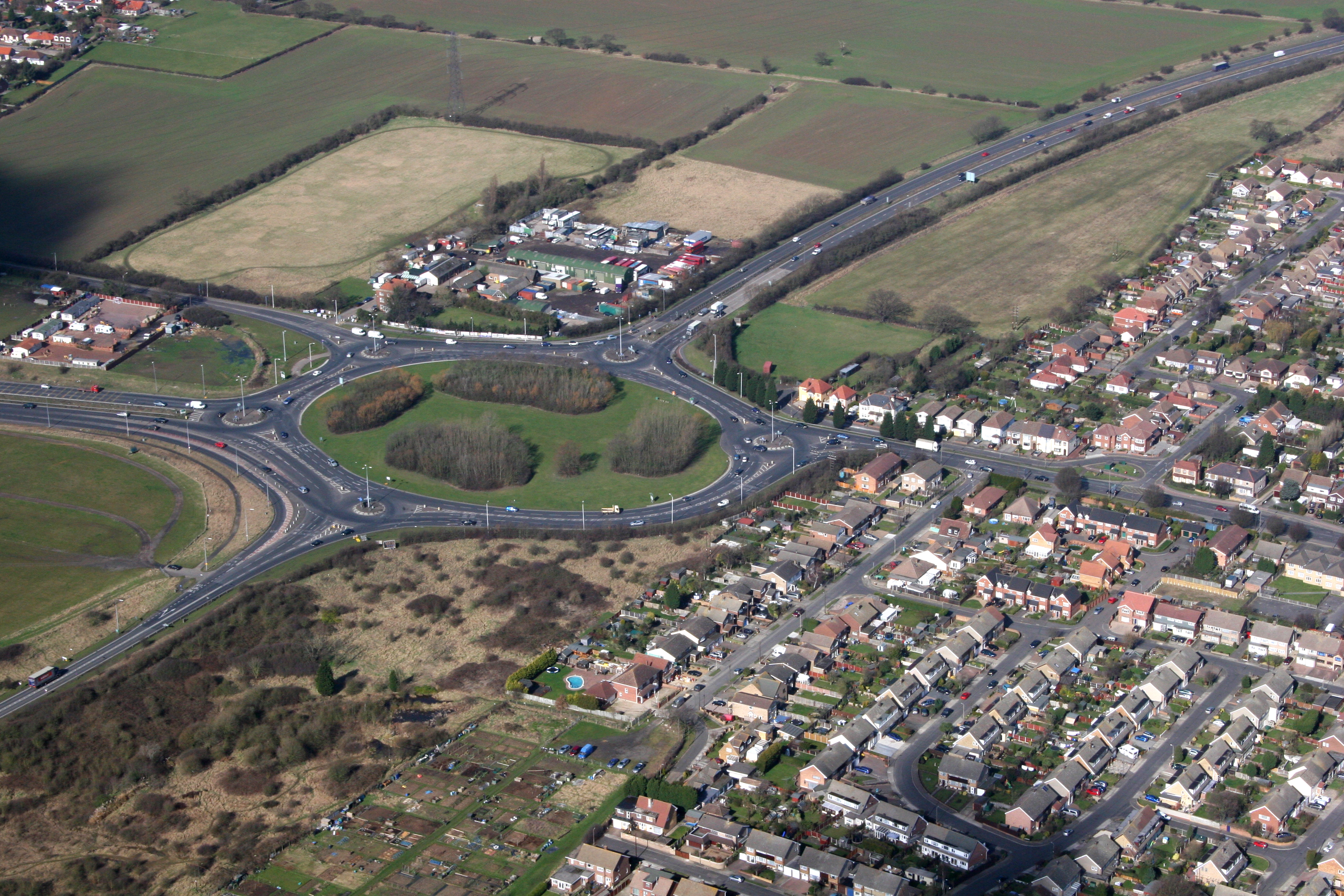
Sadlers Farm Roundabout, prior to improvements

==== Wennington to Sadlers Hall Farm ====
The Thames Gateway section of the A13 leaves London at Wennington on the border with Thurrock, still dual three lanes, intersecting with the M25 motorway at Junction 30, close to the Dartford Crossing and Lakeside Shopping Centre. The A13 here is a much older dual carriageway, dating mostly to the 1980s, including the four-lane flyover above the M25, left incomplete for over 15 years. The Wennington to M25 section opened in late 1998. The next junction, the turn-off for Lakeside (A126), has only west-facing slips, so there is no exit eastbound. It is then dual three lanes past the junction with the A1089, the road into Tilbury, and loses its Trunk Road status to the latter. The A13 finally drops down to two lanes each way at the nearby A128 junction. It is dual for another 9 miles (14 km), bypassing Stanford-le-Hope and Basildon before it reaches the Sadlers Hall Farm (or Sadlers Farm) roundabout. Here the road meets the A130 and loses its dual and Primary Route status. The main route into Southend is now the A127 Southend Arterial Road, accessible via the A130.

==== A13/A130 Sadlers Farm Junction ====
Improvements to the A13/A130 Sadlers Farm Junction were first given government approval in July 2006 following a 2005 public consultation. The project involved by-passing the roundabout by creating a new full-depth cutting link road between the A13 and A130, building slip roads connecting traffic to the Sadlers Farm roundabout and widening the A13 to dual four lane carriageway to Pitsea and the A130 to dual three lane carriageway to the Rayleigh Spur roundabout. The scheme is part of the Thames Gateway transport infrastructure plans which gave it an estimated cost of £63 million in 2007 and timelines it for 2012. The scheme was opened in 2012.

==== Benfleet to Shoeburyness ====
The A13 continues east of Sadlers Farm as mostly single-carriageway through Thundersley, Hadleigh, Leigh-on-Sea and Westcliff, before reaching the seaside resort of Southend-on-Sea. This is the last major town on the route, but it continues eastwards, including brief dual sections (London Road, Hadleigh, Queensway round the town centre, with its roundabouts with the A127 and A1160 (another TOTSO), and Southchurch Boulevard in Southchurch), and on to Shoeburyness, on the estuary 3 miles (4.8 km) east of Southend proper. It turns to the south at Parsons Corner, and then as Ness Road, it terminates at an end-on junction with the B1016, also forming part of Ness Road.

A13 in Essex
Eastbound exits	Junction	Westbound exits
Tower Hamlets
Start of grade-separated section, merge with A1261 East India Dock Link, signed Barking, Tilbury A13 (see Note just below)	Junction 7: Leamouth Junction	Turn-off to stay on for Central London, Blackwall Tunnel A13, Leamouth (A1020), mainline signed Canary Wharf, Isle of Dogs A1261, becomes East India Dock Link
Newham
Plaistow A124, Stratford, Canning Town, West Ham, Royal Docks, London City Airport, ExCeL A1011, B164 Note: sliproad starts on Tower Hamlets side of the River Lea!	Junction 8: Canning Town	Plaistow A124, Stratford, Canning Town, West Ham, Royal Docks, London City Airport, ExCeL A1011 (Entrance via Junction 7)
New Barn Street, no access to A13	(New Barn Street exit)	No exit - Use Junction 9.
Custom House, London City Airport, ExCeL, Stratford, Plaistow A112, Tollgate Road	Junction 9: Prince Regent	Custom House, London City Airport, ExCeL, Stratford, Plaistow A112, Tollgate Road, Freemasons Road
Noel Road (no access to A13)	(signed side streets)	East Ham Industrial Estate
Beckton, Manor Park, East Ham, London Industrial Park A117	Junction 10: Beckton Alps	Beckton, Manor Park, East Ham, London Industrial Park A117
North Circular Road, Ilford, Barking, (M11) A406, London City Airport, Royal Docks, ExCeL A1020, Woolwich Ferry (A117), Jenkins lane	Junction 11: (A406 terminus)	North Circular Road, Ilford, Barking, (M11) A406, London City Airport, Royal Docks, ExCeL A1020, Woolwich Ferry (A117)
Barking & Dagenham
Barking, Creekmouth, River Road Industrial Estate, Thames View Estate	Junction 12: Movers Lane	Barking, Creekmouth, River Road Industrial Estate, Thames View Estate
Barking A123, Becontree, Romford A1153	Junction 13: Lodge Avenue Junction (Ripple Road Junction) (NB: flyover here is single carriageway)	Barking A123, Becontree, Romford A1153
Rippleside, Commercial Estate, Container Base, Freight Centre through traffic is free-flow	(Renwick Road westbound traffic lights)	Rippleside, Commercial Estate, Container Base, Freight Centre through traffic liable to stop at lights
Dagenham, Hornchurch A1306, Dagenham Dock, Scrattons Farm Estate	Junction 14: Goresbrook Interchange	Dagenham, Hornchurch A1306, Dagenham Dock, Scrattons Farm Estate
Havering
Dagenham, Rainham A1306, Hornchurch, Elm Park (A125), CEME, Fords	Junction 15: (Marsh Way ?)	Dagenham, Rainham A1306, Hornchurch, Elm Park (A125), CEME, Fords
Ferry Lane Industrial Areas	Junction 16: (Ferry Lane ?)	Ferry Lane Industrial Areas
Wennington, West Thurrock A1306, Purfleet (A1090), Aveley (B1335)	Junction 17: Wennington	Wennington, West Thurrock A1306, Purfleet (A1090), Aveley (B1335)
Thurrock
Stansted Airport, (M11) M25, Dartford Crossing, Gatwick Airport (A282), South Ockendon (A1306), Purfleet (A1090), Thurrock services	Junction 18/Junction J30 (M25) Mar Dyke Interchange link to J31 (A282)	Stansted Airport, (M11) M25, Dartford Crossing, Gatwick Airport (A282), South Ockendon (A1306), Purfleet (A1090), Thurrock services
Lakeside Shopping Centre, West Thurrock A126 (no access to A13)	Junction 19: (Lakeside ?)	No Exit
Grays A1012, North Stifford, Orsett	Junction 20: Stifford Interchange	Grays A1012, North Stifford, Orsett
Tilbury A1089	Junction 21: Baker Street Interchange	Tilbury A1089
Brentwood A128, Grays, Linfield, East Tilbury A1013, Chadwell St Mary	Junction 22: Orsett Cock	Brentwood A128, Grays, Linfield, East Tilbury A1013, Chadwell St Mary
Services		Services
Stanford-le-Hope, Coryton A1014, Linford, East Tilbury A1013, Horndon-on-the-Hill, Laindon B1007	Junction 23: Manorway Junction (Stanford Interchange)	Stanford-le-Hope, Coryton A1014, Linford, East Tilbury A1013, Horndon-on-the-Hill, Laindon B1007
Greenacres Farm	(Private junction - farm access only)	Greenacres Farm
Basildon
Basildon A176, Vange B1464, Corringham B1420, Fobbing	Junction 24: Five Bells (Vange)	Basildon A176, Vange B1464, Corringham B1420, Fobbing
Basildon A132, Pitsea (B1464), Pitsea Hall Lane	Junction 25: Pitsea	Basildon A132, Pitsea (B1464), Pitsea Hall Lane
end of grade-separated dual carriageway Chelmsford, Southend A130 (A127), Canvey Island A130, Bowers Gifford B1464, South Benfleet A13	Junction 26: Sadlers Farm	Chelmsford, Southend A130 (A127), Canvey Island A130, Bowers Gifford B1464, London, Basildon A13 start of grade-separated dual carriageway
A13 enters/leaves Castle Point to Junction 27 (Tarpots)

== History ==
=== Original route through Newham and Barking ===
East of the River Lea, through Newham and Barking, the original route followed the A124 Barking Road and then the A123 Ripple Road. The present A13 still uses much of the eastern end of Ripple Road. The route was replaced by the East Ham & Barking Bypass first opened in 1928, which was given the number A118 before being redesignated. As with the route west of the River Lea, Barking Road is a relatively new route, being built c. 1812.

=== Original route through Dagenham and Havering ===
Ripple Road leads to Dagenham. The eastern end of this as well as New Road heading towards Rainham, in Havering, and the Greater London border, were bypassed by the new-build Thames Gateway in 1999. The former route was redesignated A1306. The western end between Dagenham and Rainham is still dual, but a short section near Rainham was singled in recent years. Like Barking Road further west, the original section of New Road between Dagenham and Rainham dates from c. 1810, and was dualled at roughly the same time as the East & Ham and Barking Bypass. New Road east of Rainham is much newer, and dates from the 1920s. It is and was single all the way towards the border at Wennington, consequently suffering congestion, especially after Lakeside Shopping Centre opened in 1990.

=== Original route in Thurrock and Basildon ===
The eastern half of New Road originates from 1924, and continues past Wennington as the A1306 Arterial Road, completed in 1925, bypassing Purfleet (the project including that town's now unclassified "bypass"). It subsequently intersects with the M25 and A282 at Junction 31, heads past Lakeside and then ends at the A1012 near Grays. The route continues as the unclassified Lodge Lane before the latter becomes part of the A1013. The A1013 continues as far as Stanford-le-Hope, where the old A13 route merges with new at the A1014 junction. The eastern end of the erstwhile single-carriageway bypass is now a farm access, but can be shadowed on foot, meeting the B1420 at a roundabout just south of the modern A13 (the actual original A13 (pre-1930s) followed London Road and Southend Road through Stanford and Corringham). East of there, the B1420 meets the A13 at the A176 junction at Thurrock/Essex border and then the B1464 London Road continues the route south of Basildon, before meeting the newer road and the A130 at Sadlers Farm. The section of the route between the M25 and Sadlers Farm was by-passed or dualled in several stages between the mid-1970s and early 1990s, with Wennington to M25 opening in 1998 (see above).

=== Original route in Southend ===
In Southend, the short dual carriageway Queensway bypasses the original route through the town centre, and while much of this is pedestrianised, it can be followed on foot. East of the town centre, Shoebury Road was bypassed by the single-carriageway Bournes Green Chase, just a few yards to the north, linking Southchurch with Shoeburyness. Finally, the terminus of the A13 has been truncated, the road formerly ending on Shoeburyness High Street at the railway station.

=== Proposed route near Southend ===
In the 1960s, a route along the lines of the A13 was planned to take traffic to a new airport located at Maplin Sands near Southend. Only preliminary planning was carried out for the road (which may have been designated a motorway) before the proposals for the airport were dropped in favour of expanding Stansted Airport). The route would have followed a similar route to the current A13 through Barking and Dagenham to Rainham before heading north-east towards South Ockendon then east towards Basildon. It would have continued eastwards between Basildon and Stanford-le-Hope before passing north of Canvey Island and south of Hadleigh, Leigh-on-Sea. The last section of road would have been constructed in the Thames Estuary passing south of Southend-on-Sea and Shoeburyness to reach the proposed site of the airport.

== Management ==
The section between Limehouse and Wennington is maintained by RMS (A13) Plc as part of a 30-year DBFO deal reached with the Highways Agency in 2000. It was RMS who undertook grade-separation of the East Ham & Barking Bypass section in 2002–2004. RMS also maintain the A1203 Limehouse Link tunnel as well as the Aspen Way and East India Dock Link tunnel sections of the A1261 through Docklands. This latter route runs just south of the A13, is dual carriageway and nearly all grade-separated and acts as an alternative to East India Dock Road and much of Commercial Road.

Despite the DBFO, Transport for London (who took over responsibility for all trunk non-motorway routes in London from the Highways Agency in 2000) still have overall responsibility for the entire A13 section inside Greater London, while the Highways Agency have responsibility for the remaining Trunk Road section between Wennington and the A1089 junction near Tilbury. From there until Sadlers Hall Farm, the A13 is a primary route and is maintained by Essex County Council, as is the non-primary section through Castle Point, although the sections through Southend-on-Sea and Thurrock are managed by their respective unitary authorities.

== Cycleway 3 ==
Cycleway 3 (C3) runs along the A13 between Poplar and Barking.

To the east C3 joins the A13 at the junction with the A1020/Leamouth Road. C3 runs eastbound, crossing the Bow Creek and Barking Creek and passing through Canning Town and Beckton en route. To the west, C3 ends at Greatfields Park, Barking, at the junction with Movers Lane/River Road.

West from Canning Town, C3 crosses over the A1020/Leamouth Road, heading southbound along the pavement until a junction with Sorrel Lane, where it turns right. It is signposted from Sorrel Lane and runs unbroken to Tower Hill in the City and Lancaster Gate, Hyde Park.

For the entirety of its route, C3 runs adjacent to the westbound carriageway of the A13 (to the south of the road) as a two-way bike freeway. The route is segregated from other traffic, except at some junctions. It is signposted and marked by blue paint.

Between Greatfields Park and the Lodge Avenue Junction, the two-way, segregated bikeway continues along the southern edge of the A13. The route is part of National Cycle Route 13 (NCR 13), but not the TfL Cycleways network. NCR 13 leaves the A13 to the east of Lodge Avenue Junction, crossing the A13 and joining residential streets as it runs towards Rainham. The northern terminus of NCR 13 is in Fakenham, Norfolk.

== Future developments ==
=== A13 Passenger Transport Corridor (Southend) ===
The scheme aims to improve public transport along the A13; it includes bus stop improvements, provision of real time information and bus prioritisation at signals as well as junction enhancements and road widening. The road widening is planned for a number of points on the Hatley Gardens and Kenneth Road stretch of the A13. Following a public consultation in March 2009, the scheme was approved."The people of Thurrock have been calling for this for more than a decade, now at last the money is in sight and we can start to get things moving." The original estimated cost of the scheme was given at £4 million in the 2001–2006 Local Transport Plan and increased to £4.9 million in the 2006–2011 update. "The government is recognising that a further £80 million more is needed to actually build the scheme."

=== London ===
Grade-separation of Renwick Road traffic lights in Barking, the final at-grade junction between Canning Town and Sadlers Hall Farm, was due to be undertaken "in time for the Olympics in 2012". The works may also involve replacement of the nearby Lodge Avenue Flyover (Ripple Road Flyover), but this is subject to available funding and development of Barking Riverside.

The junction with the A406 North Circular Road was built in 1987 and is incomplete. The long-awaited Thames Gateway Bridge is yet to get the go ahead, but if built it will start at a flyover above the A13, thereby linking the A406 with the road network south of the River Thames. As of 2008, the project in its original form was cancelled by newly elected mayor Boris Johnson.

=== M25 Junction 30 ===
Improvements including widening are being made at J30 of the M25 motorway and at nearby Lakeside turn-off (A126), following a Route Management Strategy undertaken by the Highways Agency. The work commenced in late 2014 and was scheduled to be completed in autumn 2016.

== Junction list ==
County	Location	mi	km	Destinations	Notes
Greater London	Tower Hamlets	0.0	0.0	Whitechapel High Street (A11 west)	Western terminus; no access from A13 to A11 east or from A11 west to A13
Greater London	Tower Hamlets	1.3	2.1	Butcher Row (A126 south) to A1203 – Wapping, Isle of Dogs	To A1203 signed westbound only, Isle of Dogs eastbound only; northern terminus of A126
Greater London	Tower Hamlets	1.8	2.9	A101 south (Rotherhithe Tunnel) – Surrey Quays	Northern terminus of A101
Greater London	Tower Hamlets	2.2	3.5	A1261 east / A1205 north (Burdett Road) – Docklands, Isle of Dogs, Mile End	Only A1205 and Mile End signed westbound; western terminus of A1261; southern terminus of A1205
Greater London	Tower Hamlets	3.0	4.8	A1206 south (Preston's Road) – Isle of Dogs, Docklands, City Airport	Docklands and City Airport signed westbound only; northern terminus of A1206
Greater London	Tower Hamlets	2.8	4.5	A12 north-east / A102 south (Blackwall Tunnel) – Stratford, Dalston, Lewisham, Bow, Hackney	Bow and Hackney signed westbound only; south-western terminus of A12; northern terminus of A102
Greater London	Tower Hamlets	3.1	5.0	A1020 east – Leamouth, Woolwich Ferry, City Airport, Isle of Dogs, Canary Wharf	Woolwich Ferry and City Airport signed eastbound only, Isle of Dogs and Canary Wharf westbound only; western terminus of A1020
Greater London	Tower Hamlets	3.2	5.1	Begin expressway	
Greater London	Tower Hamlets	3.2	5.1	A1011 – Stratford, Canning Town	Eastbound exit and westbound entrance
Greater London	Tower Hamlets	3.2	5.1	A1261 west – Isle of Dogs, Canary Wharf	Westbound exit and eastbound entrance; eastern terminus of A1261
Greater London	Newham	3.7	6.0	A1011 – Stratford, City Airport	Westbound exit only
Greater London	Newham	4.4– 4.9	7.1– 7.9	A112 – Custom House, Silvertown, Plaistow, City Airport	Plaistow signed eastbound only, City Airport westbound only
Greater London	Newham	5.6– 6.0	9.0– 9.7	A117 – Manor Park, East Ham, Beckton	
Greater London	Newham	6.3– 6.7	10.1– 10.8	A406 west (North Circular) / A1020 west to A12 / M11	Eastern terminus of A406 / A1020
Greater London	Barking and Dagenham	7.2– 7.6	11.6– 12.2	Barking, Creekmouth	
Greater London	Barking and Dagenham	8.0– 8.4	12.9– 13.5	A1153 – Romford, Becontree Heath A123 – Barking	A1153 and destinations signed eastbound only, A123 and Barking westbound only
Greater London	Barking and Dagenham	9.3– 9.7	15.0– 15.6	A1306 – Dagenham, Hornchurch	
Greater London	Havering	10.8– 11.2	17.4– 18.0	To A1306 / A125 – Dagenham east, Hornchurch, Elm Park	To A1306, A125, and Elm Park signed westbound only
Greater London	Havering	11.6– 12.1	18.7– 19.5	Ferry Lane Industrial Area	
Greater London— Essex boundary	Havering— Aveley boundary	13.8– 14.3	22.2– 23.0	A1306 to A1090 / B1335 – Wennington, West Thurrock, Purfleet, Aveley, Rainham	To A1090 and B1335 signed eastbound only, A1306 and Rainham westbound only
Essex		15.9– 16.4	25.6– 26.4	M25 north / A282 south (Dartford Crossing) to M11 / M1 – Stansted Airport	Southern terminus of M25; northern terminus of A282
Essex	South Ockendon— Grays boundary	16.9	27.2	A126 east – Thurrock	Eastbound exit and westbound entrance; western terminus of A126
Essex	Grays	18.0– 18.5	29.0– 29.8	A1012 south to A1036 – Grays	Northern terminus of A1012
Essex	Orsett—Grays boundary	19.6– 20.3	31.5– 32.7	A1089 south – Tilbury Docks	Tilbury Docks signed westbound only; northern terminus of A1089
Essex	Orsett—Grays boundary	21.0– 21.6	33.8– 34.8	A128 north – Brentwood	Southern terminus of A128
Essex	Stanford-le-Hope— Horndon-on-the-Hill boundary	23.1– 23.5	37.2– 37.8	A1014 east / A1013 / B1007 – Shell Haven, Coryton, Stanford-le-Hope, Horndon-on-the-Hill, Corringham, East Tilbury, Linford	A1013, East Tilbury, and Linford signed westbound only; western terminus of A1014
Essex	Fobbing—Basildon boundary	25.9– 26.5	41.7– 42.6	A176 north – Basildon	Southern terminus of A176
Essex	Basildon	28.0– 28.4	45.1– 45.7	A132 north-east – Basildon	South-western terminus of A132
Essex	Basildon—Castle Point district boundary			End expressway	
Essex	Basildon—Castle Point district boundary	29.3– 29.9	47.2– 48.1	A130 (Canvey Way) / B1464 (London Road) / A127 – Chelmsford, Canvey Island, Bowers Gifford, Southend Airport	
Essex	Hadleigh	32.5	52.3	A129 north-west (Rayleigh Road) / B1014 (Benfleet Road) – Rayleigh, Canvey Island, South Benfleet	South-eastern terminus of A129
Essex	Southend-on-Sea	36.1	58.1	A1158 north (Southbourne Grove) to A127 – London, Chelmsford, Airport	Only Airport signed eastbound; southern terminus of A1158
Essex	Southend-on-Sea	37.7	60.7	A127 west (Victoria Avenue) to A130 – London, Basildon, Chelmsford	Eastern terminus of A127
Essex	Southend-on-Sea	37.9	61.0	Queensway (A1160 south) / Sutton Road (B1015) / Southchurch Road	Northern terminus of A1160
Essex	Southend-on-Sea	39.7	63.9	A1159 north-west / Thorpe Hall Road to A127 / A130 – Rochford, London, Chelmsford	Only A1159 and Rochford signed eastbound; south-eastern terminus of A1159
Essex	Southend-on-Sea	41.7	67.1	Ness Road (B1016) / Campfield Road	Eastern terminus
1.000 mi = 1.609 km; 1.000 km = 0.621 mi: Incomplete access

== A13 in popular culture ==
In 1977, Billy Bragg wrote lyrics to his song named after the road, which was first recorded in 1985 and published for a John Peel session, it mentions several English towns which are mentioned along the A13. In 2004, British author Iain Sinclair published a psychogeographic road novel, titled Dining on Stones, which loosely follows the route of the A13 from East London to the Thames Estuary. Mike Newman published an account of attempting to walk the route of the A13 in Adverse Camber: An Incomplete walk to the seaside in 2018.
