= 2024 Brentwood Borough Council election =

Local election in Brentwood, England

← 2023	2 May 2024	2026 →

All 39 seats to Brentwood Borough Council 20 seats needed for a majority

	First party	Second party	Third party
Leader	Will Russell	Barry Aspinell	Tim Barrett
Party	Conservative	Liberal Democrats	Labour
Last election	17 seats, 37.5%	17 seats, 43.7%	2 seats, 14.3%
Seats before	18	17	2
Seats won	19	17	3
Seat change	▲1	Steady	▲1
Popular vote	21,647	21,952	9,528
Percentage	39.4%	39.9%	17.3%
Swing	▲1.9%	▼3.8%	▲3.0%
- Winner of each seat at the 2024 Brentwood Borough Council election
Leader before election
Barry Aspinell
Liberal Democrats
No overall control
Leader after election
Barry Aspinell
Liberal Democrats
No overall control

The 2024 Brentwood Borough Council election was held on Thursday 2 May 2024, alongside the other local elections in the United Kingdom being held on the same day. All 39 members of Brentwood Borough Council in Essex were elected following boundary changes.

The council was under no overall control prior to the election. The Conservatives were the largest party, but the council was being run by a Liberal Democrat and Labour coalition. The election saw a very similar distribution of seats, and the Liberal Democrat and Labour coalition continued to run the council.

== Background ==
Since its creation in 1974, Brentwood has been a mostly Conservative-controlled council. The party held control until 1990, with the Liberal Democrats taking the council from no overall control in 1991. They controlled the council until 2003, with the Conservatives re-taking control in 2004.

The Conservatives held a majority on the council until the most recent election, where the council again fell into no overall control. In that election, the Liberal Democrats gained 3 seats with 43.7% of the vote, the Conservatives lost 3 with 37.5%, and Labour remained at 2 seats with 14.3%.

== Boundary changes ==
Brentwood usually elects its councillors in thirds, on a 4-year cycle. However, following boundary changes, all councillors will be elected to the new wards. The change increases the number of councillors by 2.

Old wards	No. of seats	New wards	No. of seats
Brentwood North	3	Blackmore and Doddinghurst	3
Brentwood South	3	Brentwood North	3
Brentwood West	3	Brentwood South	3
Brizes and Doddinghurst	3	Brentwood West	3
Herongate, Ingrave and West Horndon	2	Brizes, Stondon Massey and South Weald	3
Hutton Central	2	Herongate, Ingrave & West Horndon	3
Hutton East	2	Hutton East	3
Hutton North	2	Hutton North	3
Hutton South	2	Hutton South	3
Ingatestone, Fryerning and Mountnessing	3	Ingatestone, Fryerning and Mountnessing	3
Pilgrims Hatch	3	Pilgrims Hatch	3
Shenfield	3	Shenfield	3
South Weald	1	Warley	3
Tipps Cross	2		
Warley	3		

== Summary ==
Despite all seats being up for election, the resultant seat numbers were very similar after the election. The Liberal Democrats kept the same number of seats, the Conservatives and Labour each having a net gain of one.

=== Previous council composition ===
After 2023 election		Before 2024 election		After 2024 election	
Party	Seats	Party	Seats	Party	Seats
Conservative	17	Conservative	18	Conservative	19
Liberal Democrats	17	Liberal Democrats	17	Liberal Democrats	17
Labour	2	Labour	2	Labour	3
Independent	1	Independent	0	Independent	0

Changes:

- June 2023: Andrew Wiles readmitted to Conservative group

=== Election result ===
Brentwood Council's composition after the 2024 local elections

2024 Brentwood Borough Council election
Party	Candidates	Seats	Gains	Losses	Net gain/loss	Seats %	Votes %	Votes	+/−
Conservative	39	19	0	1	▲1	48.7	39.4	21,647	+1.9
Liberal Democrats	39	17	0	0	Steady	43.6	39.9	21,952	–3.8
Labour	39	3	1	0	▲1	7.7	17.3	9,528	+3.0
Green	9	0	0	0	Steady	0.0	2.5	1,382	+0.7
Reform UK	2	0	0	0	Steady	0.0	0.8	464	+0.4

== Ward results ==
The Statement of Persons Nominated, which details the candidates standing in each ward, was released by Brentwood Borough Council following the close of nomination on 5 April 2024. The results of the election were announced on 3 May 2024.

=== Blackmore & Doddinghurst ===
Blackmore & Doddinghurst (3 seats)
Party	Candidate	Votes	%	±%
Conservative	Roger McCheyne*	982	64.0	
Conservative	Keith Parker*	960	62.5	
Conservative	Cliff Poppy*	947	61.7	
Liberal Democrats	Mary Spiers	291	19.0	
Liberal Democrats	Vanessa Laplain	218	14.2	
Liberal Democrats	Heather Leathley	210	13.7	
Labour	Peter Dedman	180	11.7	
Green	Nicholas Kelly	180	11.7	
Labour	Thomas Acton	179	11.7	
Labour	Wendy Marshall	177	11.5	
Turnout		1,552	43.3	
Registered electors		4,703		
Conservative win (new seat)				
Conservative win (new seat)				
Conservative win (new seat)				

=== Brentwood North ===
Brentwood North (3 seats)
Party	Candidate	Votes	%	±%
Liberal Democrats	Alison Fulcher*	879	60.6	
Liberal Democrats	Philip Mynott*	868	59.8	
Liberal Democrats	Steve Mayo*	840	57.9	
Conservative	Hannah Nelson	326	22.5	
Labour	Carol Allen	279	19.2	
Conservative	Ben Slade	279	19.2	
Conservative	Harrison Slade	241	16.6	
Labour	Niels Andersen	233	16.1	
Labour	Robert Marshall	229	15.8	
Green	Paul Jeater	181	12.5	
Turnout		1,531	30.4	
Registered electors		5,051		
Liberal Democrats hold				
Liberal Democrats hold				
Liberal Democrats hold				

=== Brentwood South ===
Brentwood South (3 seats)
Party	Candidate	Votes	%	±%
Labour	Gareth Barrett*	770	49.4	
Labour	Tim Barrett*	758	48.6	
Labour	Elizabeth Jerrard	649	41.6	
Liberal Democrats	Nigel Clarke	573	36.7	
Liberal Democrats	Arthur Leathley	526	33.7	
Liberal Democrats	Toby Green	497	31.9	
Conservative	Adrian Coolbergen	314	20.1	
Conservative	Peter Jakobsson	301	19.3	
Conservative	John Parrish	292	18.7	
Turnout		1,636	36.8	
Registered electors		4,448		
Labour hold				
Labour hold				
Labour gain from Conservative				

=== Brentwood West ===
Brentwood West (3 seats)
Party	Candidate	Votes	%	±%
Liberal Democrats	Sarah Cloke	713	52.6	
Liberal Democrats	David Kendall*	702	51.8	
Liberal Democrats	Dominic Naylor*	660	48.7	
Conservative	Lucy Gelderbloem	425	31.4	
Conservative	Ethan Russell	418	30.9	
Conservative	Sandy Tanner	376	27.8	
Labour	Kevin Brailey	252	18.6	
Labour	Joanna Moncrieff	211	15.6	
Labour Co-op	Richard Millwood	176	13.0	
Green	Marc Sardinha	130	9.6	
Turnout		1,471	28.9	
Registered electors		5,197		
Liberal Democrats hold				
Liberal Democrats hold				
Liberal Democrats hold				

=== Brizes, Stondon Massey & South Weald ===
Brizes, Stondon Massey & South Weald (3 seats)
Party	Candidate	Votes	%	±%
Conservative	Chrissy Gelderbloem*	730	52.2	
Conservative	Will Russell*	727	51.9	
Conservative	Soni Sunger	604	43.2	
Liberal Democrats	Brenner Munden*	566	40.4	
Liberal Democrats	Brent Smith	518	37.0	
Liberal Democrats	Nicola Munden	512	36.6	
Labour	David Jobbins	179	12.8	
Green	Rebecca Enifer	142	10.1	
Labour	Pauline Watts	114	8.1	
Labour	Eric Watts	107	7.6	
Turnout		1,564	34.2	
Registered electors		4,573		
Conservative win (new seat)				
Conservative win (new seat)				
Conservative win (new seat)				

=== Herongate, Ingrave & West Horndon ===
Herongate, Ingrave & West Horndon (3 seats)
Party	Candidate	Votes	%	±%
Conservative	Sheila Murphy*	701	69.2	
Conservative	Adrian Baldock	660	65.1	
Conservative	Fiona Marsh*	639	63.0	
Liberal Democrats	Gary Maxius	246	24.3	
Liberal Democrats	Anne Long	233	23.0	
Liberal Democrats	Benedicta Worsfold	196	19.3	
Labour	June Barrett	131	12.9	
Labour	Paul Barrett	121	11.9	
Labour	Gary Earle	114	11.2	
Turnout		1,146	28.4	
Registered electors		3,559		
Conservative hold				
Conservative hold				
Conservative hold				

=== Hutton East ===
Hutton East (3 seats)
Party	Candidate	Votes	%	±%
Conservative	Adam Chinnery	672	48.8	
Liberal Democrats	Benjamin Rigby*	636	46.2	
Conservative	Jason Gibson	597	43.3	
Liberal Democrats	Sharon Ward	534	38.8	
Liberal Democrats	Francis Caves	515	37.4	
Conservative	Sat Lal	510	37.0	
Reform UK	Paul Godfrey	237	17.2	
Labour	Ben Booker	154	11.2	
Labour	Malcolm Burgess	145	10.5	
Labour	Jacqueline Nyiro	133	9.7	
Turnout		1,545	34.0	
Registered electors		4,538		
Conservative hold				
Liberal Democrats hold				
Conservative win (new seat)				

=== Hutton North ===
Hutton North (3 seats)
Party	Candidate	Votes	%	±%
Conservative	Keith Barber*	861	60.2	
Conservative	Jan Pound*	714	49.9	
Conservative	Jay Patel	674	47.1	
Labour	Philip Holland	444	31.0	
Labour	Noor Hussain	386	27.0	
Labour	Neil McAree	383	26.8	
Liberal Democrats	Henry MacDonnell	278	19.4	
Liberal Democrats	Florina Constanda	209	14.6	
Green	Michael Flood	181	12.6	
Liberal Democrats	Elise Mayer	164	11.5	
Turnout		1,570	33.8	
Registered electors		4,640		
Conservative hold				
Conservative hold				
Conservative win (new seat)				

=== Hutton South ===
Hutton South (3 seats)
Party	Candidate	Votes	%	±%
Conservative	Roger Hirst*	757	51.1	
Conservative	Mark Reed*	752	50.7	
Conservative	Mellissa Slade*	698	47.1	
Labour	Jane Winter	464	31.3	
Labour	Jonathan Saunders	461	31.1	
Labour	Rowan Sumner	428	28.9	
Liberal Democrats	Laura Carey	263	17.7	
Liberal Democrats	John Chapple	260	17.5	
Green	John Hamilton	183	12.3	
Liberal Democrats	Valdomiro Lourenco	180	12.1	
Turnout		1,623	29.7	
Registered electors		5,202		
Conservative hold				
Conservative hold				
Conservative win (new seat)				

=== Ingatestone, Fryerning & Mountnessing ===
Ingatestone, Fryerning & Mountnessing (3 seats)
Party	Candidate	Votes	%	±%
Liberal Democrats	Darryl Sankey*	999	58.3	
Liberal Democrats	Hugh Gorton*	818	47.7	
Conservative	Lesley Wagland*	809	47.2	
Liberal Democrats	Susan Hyde	781	45.6	
Conservative	Thomas Bridge*	743	43.3	
Conservative	David Wylie	607	35.4	
Labour	Patricia Dedman	136	7.9	
Labour	Caroline Russell	130	7.6	
Labour	Richard Enever	120	7.0	
Turnout		1,838	36.9	
Registered electors		4,985		
Liberal Democrats hold				
Liberal Democrats hold				
Conservative hold				

=== Pilgrims Hatch ===
Pilgrims Hatch (3 seats)
Party	Candidate	Votes	%	±%
Liberal Democrats	Barry Aspinell*	1,015	74.5	
Liberal Democrats	Vicky Davies*	996	73.1	
Liberal Democrats	Mark Lewis*	892	65.5	
Conservative	Gordon Cowley	223	16.4	
Conservative	Geraldine Jakobsson	215	15.8	
Conservative	Louise Rowlands	205	15.0	
Labour	Simon Ball	162	11.9	
Labour	Katie Hutton	150	11.0	
Labour	Francisca Dapp	133	9.8	
Green	David Hale	97	7.1	
Turnout		1,453	31.2	
Registered electors		4,662		
Liberal Democrats hold				
Liberal Democrats hold				
Liberal Democrats hold				

=== Shenfield ===
Shenfield (3 seats)
Party	Candidate	Votes	%	±%
Liberal Democrats	David Worsfold*	835	50.0	
Liberal Democrats	Nicky Cuthbert*	801	47.9	
Conservative	Thomas Gordon	692	41.4	
Liberal Democrats	John Singh	676	40.4	
Conservative	Thomas Heard*	652	39.0	
Conservative	Sandy Brown	621	37.2	
Reform UK	Richard Briggs	227	13.6	
Green	Julian Goode	148	8.9	
Labour	Anna Cadzow	141	8.4	
Labour	Dominic Maddock	111	6.6	
Labour	Dick Carter	110	6.6	
Turnout		1,808	41.8	
Registered electors		4,323		
Liberal Democrats hold				
Liberal Democrats hold				
Conservative hold				

=== Warley ===
Warley (3 seats)
Party	Candidate	Votes	%	±%
Liberal Democrats	Martin Cuthbert*	630	59.2	
Liberal Democrats	Mark Haigh*	617	58.0	
Liberal Democrats	Jay Laplain*	605	56.8	
Conservative	Jean McGinley	243	22.8	
Conservative	Paul Faragher	241	22.6	
Conservative	John Gibson	239	22.5	
Labour	Michael Bernstein	171	16.1	
Labour	Jackie Gilbey	167	15.7	
Labour Co-op	Susan Kortlandt	140	13.2	
Green	Olivia Ritson	140	13.2	
Turnout		1,147	28.9	
Registered electors		3,963		
Liberal Democrats hold				
Liberal Democrats hold				
Liberal Democrats hold				

== By-elections ==
=== Hutton South ===
Hutton South by-election: 2 October 2025
Party	Candidate	Votes	%	±%
Reform UK	Russell Quirk	805	45.8	N/A
Conservative	Thomas Bridge	544	30.9	–14.5
Labour	Jonathan Saunders	234	13.3	–14.5
Liberal Democrats	Brennar Munden	109	6.2	–9.6
Green	David Hale	66	3.8	–7.2
Majority		261	14.9	N/A
Turnout		1,762	34.1	+4.4
Registered electors		5,172		
Reform UK gain from Conservative				
