= 2004 Brentwood Borough Council election =

2004 UK local government election

Results of the 2004 Brentwood Borough Council election

Elections to Brentwood Borough Council were held on 10 June 2004. One third of the council was up for election, all seats last being elected in 2002 following boundary changes. The Conservative Party took control of the council.

After the election, the composition of the council was:

- Conservatives 21
- Liberal Democrats 13
- Labour 3

== Election result ==
Brentwood Borough Council Election Result 2004
Party	Seats	Gains	Losses	Net gain/loss	Seats %	Votes %	Votes	+/−
Conservative	11	5	0	+5	84.6	52.2	11,722	+4.8%
Liberal Democrats	1	0	5	-5	7.7	31.6	7,093	-4.9%
Labour	1	0	0	0	7.7	8.9	2,003	-1.9%
UKIP	0	0	0	0	0.0	6.2	1,389	+6.2%
Green	0	0	0	0	0.0	1.2	266	+0.2%
Others	0	0	0	0	0.0	0.0	0	-4.3%

The swing was 4.9% from the Liberal Democrats to the Conservatives.

== Ward results ==
Brentwood Borough Council elections, 2004: Brentwood North
Party	Candidate	Votes	%	±%
Conservative	Paul Faragher	783	40.0	+4.7
Liberal Democrats	Pauline Myers	648	33.1	−12.6
UKIP	Yvonne Maguire	230	11.7	+11.7
Labour	Richard Bingley	163	8.3	−3.2
Green	Frank Seckleman	126	6.4	−1.0
Majority		135	6.8	−3.6
Turnout		1,959	43.0	+14.4
Conservative gain from Liberal Democrats		Swing	+8.7	

Brentwood Borough Council elections, 2004: Brentwood South
Party	Candidate	Votes	%	±%
Labour	Colin Elphick	596	34.3	−6.3
Conservative	Philip O'Mara	458	26.3	+2.0
Liberal Democrats	Doris Suckling	396	22.8	−11.8
UKIP	Rowan Holland	283	16.3	+16.3
Majority		138	7.9	+1.9
Turnout		1,739	44.2	+9.0
Labour hold		Swing	-4.2	

Brentwood Borough Council elections, 2004: Brentwood West
Party	Candidate	Votes	%	±%
Conservative	Joan Holmes	813	48.6	+11.9
Liberal Democrats	Shirley Howe	705	42.2	−12.2
Labour	Michael Le-Surf	139	8.3	−0.5
Majority		108	6.5	−11.2
Turnout		1,672	39.9	+14.6
Conservative gain from Liberal Democrats		Swing	+12.1	

Brentwood Borough Council elections, 2004: Brizes & Doddinghurst
Party	Candidate	Votes	%	±%
Liberal Democrats	Derek Hardy	654	35.7	−30.3
Conservative	Antony Williams	607	33.2	+5.5
UKIP	Leonard Williams	411	22.4	+22.4
Labour	Peter Mayo	87	4.8	−1.2
Green	Andrew Saterlay	70	3.8	+3.8
Majority		47	2.6	−35.8
Turnout		1,831	40.1	+12.0
Liberal Democrats hold		Swing	-17.9	

Brentwood Borough Council elections, 2004: Hutton Central
Party	Candidate	Votes	%	±%
Conservative	Jean McGinley	945	71.3	+7.3
Liberal Democrats	Marcia Collins	253	19.1	−2.6
Labour	Cornelius Maxey	120	9.1	+0.4
Majority		692	52.2	+10.0
Turnout		1,325	46.8	+7.0
Conservative hold		Swing	+5.0	

Brentwood Borough Council elections, 2004: Hutton North
Party	Candidate	Votes	%	±%
Conservative	Louise Monnickendam	861	59.6	−1.1
Liberal Democrats	Deborah Wood	444	30.7	+1.2
Labour	Charles Bisson	126	8.7	−0.7
Majority		417	28.9	−2.3
Turnout		1,444	45.9	+11.9
Conservative gain from Liberal Democrats		Swing	-1.2	

Brentwood Borough Council elections, 2004: Hutton South
Party	Candidate	Votes	%	±%
Conservative	Francis Kenny	916	71.2	+5.2
Liberal Democrats	Roberta Hall	274	21.3	−0.8
Labour	Ian Wands	83	6.4	−0.1
Majority		642	49.9	+5.9
Turnout		1,287	43.2	+12.1
Conservative hold		Swing	+3.0	

Brentwood Borough Council elections, 2004: Ingatestone, Fryerning & Mountnessing
Party	Candidate	Votes	%	±%
Conservative	Anthony Sleep	986	43.1	−12.1
Liberal Democrats	Christopher Dale	845	36.9	+11.0
UKIP	Arthur Howes	293	12.8	+12.8
Labour	Jane Winter	90	3.9	−0.2
Green	Beryl Lankester	70	3.1	+0.2
Majority		141	6.2	−23.0
Turnout		2,290	49.2	+7.9
Conservative hold		Swing		

Brentwood Borough Council elections, 2004: Pilgrims Hatch
Party	Candidate	Votes	%	±%
Conservative	Sandra Roberts	916	48.2	+11.8
Liberal Democrats	Anne Long	826	43.5	−8.8
Labour	Michele Wigram	140	7.4	−3.5
Majority		90	4.7	−11.3
Turnout		1,899	41.6	+11.5
Conservative gain from Liberal Democrats		Swing	+10.3	

Brentwood Borough Council elections, 2004: Shenfield
Party	Candidate	Votes	%	±%
Conservative	Margaret Brehaut	1,401	71.7	+49.9
Conservative	Lionel Lee	1,318	67.4	+45.6
Liberal Democrats	Max Gottesmann	405	20.7	+4.9
Liberal Democrats	Mark Long	378	19.3	+3.5
Labour	Bernadette Pavitt	140	7.2	−0.9
Labour	Richard Margrave	114	5.8	−2.3
Majority		1,023	52.3	+20.5
Majority		913	46.7	+14.9
Turnout		1,955	47.4	+10.9
Conservative hold		Swing	+22.5	
Conservative hold		Swing	+21.1	

Brentwood Borough Council elections, 2004: Tipps Cross
Party	Candidate	Votes	%	±%
Conservative	Dominic Good	829	61.0	+4.5
Liberal Democrats	Jacqueline Anslow	431	31.7	−7.1
Labour	Rita Anderson	90	6.6	+2.0
Majority		398	29.3	+11.5
Turnout		1,359	45.8	+6.4
Conservative hold		Swing	+5.8	

Brentwood Borough Council elections, 2004: Warley
Party	Candidate	Votes	%	±%
Conservative	David Tee	889	44.1	−1.0
Liberal Democrats	Robert Barr	834	41.4	−4.1
UKIP	Janette Gulleford	172	8.5	+8.5
Labour	Peter Anderson	115	5.7	−3.3
Majority		55	2.7	+2.3
Turnout		2,014	46.4	+13.2
Conservative gain from Liberal Democrats		Swing	+1.6	

== Composition of expiring seats before election ==
Ward	Party	Incumbent Elected	Incumbent	Stood?
Brentwood North	Liberal Democrats	2002	Pauline Myers	Yes
Brentwood South	Labour	2002	Colin Elphick	Reelected
Brentwood West	Liberal Democrats	2002	Shirley Howe	Yes
Brizes & Doddinghurst	Liberal Democrats	2002	Derek Hardy	Reelected
Hutton Central	Conservative	2002	Jean McGinley	Reelected
Hutton North	Liberal Democrats	2002	Peggy Freeman	No
Hutton South	Conservative	2002	Francis Kenny	Reelected
Ingatestone, Fryerning & Mountnessing	Conservative	2002	Anthony Sleep	Reelected
Pilgrims Hatch	Liberal Democrats	2002	Anne Long	Yes
Shenfield	Conservative	2002	Peter Franklin	No
Shenfield	Conservative	2002	Margaret Brehaut	Reelected
Tipps Cross	Conservative	2002	Dominic Good	Reelected
South Weald	Liberal Democrats	2002	James Shawcross	Reelected
Warley	Liberal Democrats	2002	Robert Barr	Yes
