= 2003 Brentwood Borough Council election =

2003 UK local government election

Results of the 2003 Brentwood Borough Council election

Elections to Brentwood Borough Council were held on 1 May 2003. One third of the council was up for election, all seats last being elected in 2002 following boundary changes. Twelve years of Liberal Democrat control ended with the council passing into no overall control.

After the election, the composition of the council was

- Liberal Democrat 18
- Conservative 16
- Labour 3

== Election result ==
Brentwood Borough Council election result 2003
Party	Seats	Gains	Losses	Net gain/loss	Seats %	Votes %	Votes	+/−
Conservative	6	2	0	+2	50.0	47.4	7,414	+5.7%
Liberal Democrats	5	0	2	-2	41.7	36.5	5,698	-5.2%
Labour	1	1	0	+1	8.3	10.8	1,688	-0.1%
Liberal	0	0	1	-1	0.0	2.9	456	+1.0%
New Britain	0	0	0	0	0.0	1.4	219	+1.4%
Green	0	0	0	0	0.0	1.0	151	+0.3%
Others	0	0	0	0	0.0	0.0	0	-1.5%

The swing was 5.5% from the Liberal Democrats to the Conservatives.

== Ward results ==
Brentwood Borough Council elections, 2003: Brentwood North
Party	Candidate	Votes	%	±%
Liberal Democrats	Reg Straw	597	45.7	−4.9
Conservative	Margaret Hamilton	461	35.3	+6.4
Labour	Roy Goddard	150	11.5	+0.5
Green	Frank Seckleman	96	7.4	−2.3
Majority		136	10.4	−11.3
Turnout		1,306	28.6	−4.9
Liberal Democrats hold		Swing	-5.7	

Brentwood Borough Council elections, 2003: Brentwood South
Party	Candidate	Votes	%	±%
Labour	David Hann	564	40.6	+3.3
Liberal Democrats	Margaret Hogan	481	34.6	+5.1
Conservative	Louise Monnickendam	337	24.3	+0.8
Majority		83	6.0	−3.0
Turnout		1,389	35.2	−2.4
Labour gain from Liberal Democrats		Swing	-0.9	

Brentwood Borough Council elections, 2003: Brentwood West
Party	Candidate	Votes	%	±%
Liberal Democrats	Allan Wheatley	560	54.4	−1.3
Conservative	Peter Cullum	378	36.7	+6.9
Labour	Cornelius Maxey	91	8.8	+0.9
Majority		182	17.7	−8.2
Turnout		1,030	25.3	−8.6
Liberal Democrats hold		Swing	-4.1	

Brentwood Borough Council elections, 2003: Brizes & Doddinghurst
Party	Candidate	Votes	%	±%
Liberal Democrats	Colin Brown	850	66.0	+6.8
Conservative	Robin Maillard	356	27.7	+2.8
Labour	Michele Wigram	77	6.0	−4.7
Majority		494	38.4	+4.1
Turnout		1,287	28.1	−4.3
Liberal Democrats hold		Swing	+2.0	

Brentwood Borough Council elections, 2003: Herongate, Ingrave & West Horndon
Party	Candidate	Votes	%	±%
Conservative	Gordon MacLellan	662	54.5	+18.3
Liberal	Roy Boggis	456	37.6	−1.0
Labour	Richard Burns	92	7.6	+2.6
Majority		206	17.0	+7.3
Turnout		1,214	42.0	−0.9
Conservative gain from Liberal		Swing	+9.6	

Brentwood Borough Council elections, 2003: Hutton East
Party	Candidate	Votes	%	±%
Conservative	Christopher Hossack	556	57.6	+17.4
Liberal Democrats	Stephen Tilley	326	33.8	−10.0
Labour	William Harman	77	8.0	−2.4
Majority		230	23.8	+20.2
Turnout		965	34.6	−0.7
Conservative gain from Liberal Democrats		Swing	+13.7	

Brentwood Borough Council elections, 2003: Hutton North
Party	Candidate	Votes	%	±%
Conservative	Dudley Payne	649	60.7	+18.1
Liberal Democrats	Doris Suckling	315	29.5	−13.1
Labour	Charles Bisson	101	9.4	+0.6
Majority		334	31.2	+27.8
Turnout		1,069	34.0	−4.6
Conservative hold		Swing	+15.6	

Brentwood Borough Council elections, 2003: Ingatestone, Fryerning & Mountnessing
Party	Candidate	Votes	%	±%
Conservative	Sarah Courage	1,057	55.2	+1.8
Liberal Democrats	Jacqueline Anslow	497	25.9	−8.9
New Britain	Arthur Howes	219	11.4	+11.4
Labour	Richard Margrave	79	4.1	−1.2
Green	Beryl Lankester	55	2.9	−1.9
Majority		560	29.2	+10.6
Turnout		1,916	41.3	−5.1
Conservative hold		Swing		

Brentwood Borough Council elections, 2003: Pilgrims Hatch
Party	Candidate	Votes	%	±%
Liberal Democrats	Charles Myers	718	52.3	−5.3
Conservative	Kathryn Dean	499	36.4	+9.6
Labour	Richard Bingley	149	10.9	+1.8
Majority		219	16.0	−14.7
Turnout		1,372	30.1	−5.9
Liberal Democrats hold		Swing	-7.4	

Brentwood Borough Council elections, 2003: Shenfield
Party	Candidate	Votes	%	±%
Conservative	Philip Baker	1,141	75.6	+21.8
Liberal Democrats	Max Gottesmann	239	15.8	−3.7
Labour	Bernadette Pavitt	123	8.1	+1.4
Majority		902	59.7	+31.8
Turnout		1,510	36.5	−2.6
Conservative hold		Swing	+12.7	

Brentwood Borough Council elections, 2003: Tipps Cross
Party	Candidate	Votes	%	±%
Conservative	Madeline Henwood	665	56.5	+8.0
Liberal Democrats	Alastair Wakeley	456	38.8	−1.5
Labour	Robert Gow	54	4.6	−1.2
Majority		209	17.8	+9.6
Turnout		1,176	39.4	−3.0
Conservative hold		Swing	+4.7	

Brentwood Borough Council elections, 2003: Warley
Party	Candidate	Votes	%	±%
Liberal Democrats	Jill Hubbard	659	45.5	−0.8
Conservative	Joan Holmes	653	45.1	+6.5
Labour	Peter Anderson	131	9.0	+1.1
Majority		6	0.4	−7.2
Turnout		1,448	33.2	−4.4
Liberal Democrats hold		Swing	-3.6	

== Composition of expiring seats before election ==
Ward	Party	Incumbent Elected	Incumbent	Stood?
Brentwood North	Liberal Democrats	2002	Reg Straw	Reelected
Brentwood South	Liberal Democrats	2002	Margaret Hogan	Yes
Brentwood West	Liberal Democrats	2002	Allan Wheatley	Reelected
Brizes & Doddinghurst	Liberal Democrats	2002	Colin Brown	Reelected
Herongate, Ingrave & West Horndon	Liberal	2002	Roy Boggis	Yes
Hutton East	Liberal Democrats	2002	Stephen Tilley	Yes
Hutton North	Conservative	2002	Dudley Payne	Reelected
Ingatestone, Fryerning & Mountnessing	Conservative	2002	Sarah Courage	Reelected
Pilgrims Hatch	Liberal Democrats	2002	Charles Myers	Reelected
Shenfield	Conservative	2002	Philip Baker	Reelected
Tipps Cross	Conservative	2002	Madeline Henwood	Reelected
Warley	Liberal Democrats	2002	Jill Hubbard	Reelected
