= Michael Parrish =

British political candidate

John Anthony Michael Parrish (known as Michael Parrish) was the Chairman of the Brentwood and Ongar Conservative Association during the split in the local party over the influence of the Peniel Pentecostal Church.

Parrish is married with two children.

Parrish stood as a Conservative candidate in the 2002 Brentwood Borough Council elections.

Parrish owns the 'Secret Nuclear Bunker', a local joke, at Kelvedon Hatch, and owns farmland in the Navestock area.
