= Brentwood and Ongar Independent Conservative Party =

- Founded: 1999
- Dissolved: 2003
- Split from: Conservative Party
- Headquarters: Essex

The Brentwood and Ongar Independent Conservative Party was founded in 1999 by members of Brentwood and Ongar Conservative Association. This breakaway group alleged that the local Conservative association had been infiltrated by the local Peniel Pentecostal Church in Pilgrims Hatch, with 119 church members joining and some having installed themselves in key posts.

The members of the Independent Conservatives were subsequently expelled from the mainstream Conservative Party for being members of a group that was standing in opposition to them. The claims were investigated by Conservative Central Office who decided that evidence did not suggest entryism.

Until the 2002 election, the Brentwood and Ongar Independent Conservative Party had a councillor in Shenfield, Anthony Galbraith, who had crossed the floor in the council chamber from the mainstream Conservative Party. The party never succeeded in having any election candidates elected.

In February 1999, the Independent Conservatives issued a press release suggesting that the Peniel church was a cult and was 'a danger to the people of Brentwood'. The church sued for libel, and Galbraith settled for an undisclosed sum and admitted that the 'allegation referred to was wholly untrue'.

The Independent Conservatives were instrumental in encouraging Martin Bell to stand for the Brentwood and Ongar constituency in the 2001 general election.

The party was dissolved and removed from the Electoral Commission register on 18 November 2003.

== See also ==
- List of political parties in the United Kingdom
