= Hutton Mount =

Coordinates: 51.625°N 0.337°E

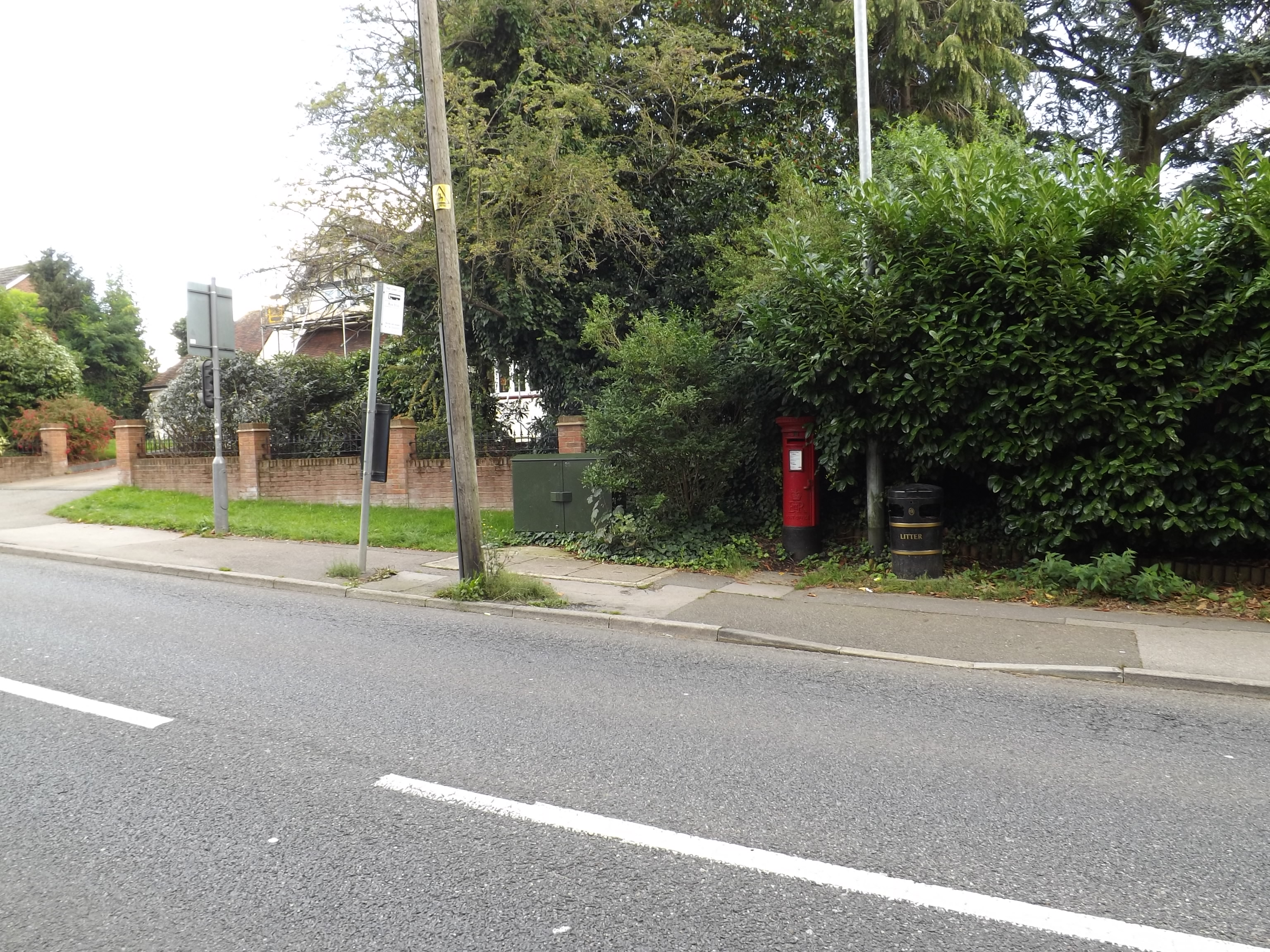

- Location within Essex
- District: Brentwood
- Shire county: Essex
- Region: East
- Country: England
- Sovereign state: United Kingdom

Hutton Mount is a residential neighbourhood of Brentwood, in Essex, England. It is in close proximity to Hutton and Shenfield. The area is largely affluent, and many roads in the area are part of a private estate. It is the location of Hutton & Shenfield Union Church, built in 1913–1914.
