= 2022 Brentwood Borough Council election =

2022 UK local government election

← 2021	5 May 2022	2023 →

13 out of 37 seats to Brentwood Borough Council 19 seats needed for a majority

	First party	Second party	Third party
Party	Conservative	Liberal Democrats	Labour
Last election	23 seats, 49.1%	12 seats, 45.3%	2 seats, 11.4%
Seats won	6	6	1
Seats after	21	14	2
Seat change	▼2	▲2	Steady
Popular vote	6,919	7,898	2,367
Percentage	39.7%	45.3%	13.6%
Swing	▼9.4%	▲13.6%	▲2.2%
- Winner of each seat at the 2022 Brentwood Borough Council election
Council control before election
Conservative
Council control after election
Conservative

The 2022 Brentwood Borough Council election took place on 5 May 2022 to elect members of Brentwood Borough Council in England. This was on the same day as other local elections.

== Results summary ==
2022 Brentwood Borough Council election
Party	This election			Full council			This election		
Party	Seats	Net	Seats %	Other	Total	Total %	Votes	Votes %	+/−
Conservative	6	▼2	46.2	15	21	56.8	6,919	39.7	-9.4
Liberal Democrats	6	▲2	46.2	8	14	37.8	7,898	45.3	+13.6
Labour	1	Steady	7.7	1	2	5.4	2,367	13.6	+2.2
Green	0	Steady	0.0	0	0	0.0	206	1.2	-2.7
Reform UK	0	Steady	0.0	0	0	0.0	31	0.2	-0.4

== Ward results ==
Results of the borough council election were announced on 6 May 2022.

=== Brentwood North ===
Brentwood North
Party	Candidate	Votes	%	±%
Liberal Democrats	Philip Mynott	940	57.1	+14.6
Conservative	Adam Chinnery	357	21.7	−9.2
Labour	Oliver Durose	183	11.1	+0.2
Green	John Hamilton	134	8.1	−5.1
Reform UK	Robert Prince	31	1.9	−0.7
Majority		583	35.4	
Turnout		1,650	30.3	
Liberal Democrats hold		Swing	▲11.9	

=== Brentwood South ===
Brentwood South
Party	Candidate	Votes	%	±%
Labour	Gareth Barrett	811	54.4	+14.7
Conservative	Jay Patel	433	29.0	−11.3
Liberal Democrats	Gary Macdonnell	247	16.6	−3.4
Majority		378	25.4	
Turnout		1,502	31.9	
Labour hold		Swing		

=== Brentwood West ===
Brentwood West
Party	Candidate	Votes	%	±%
Liberal Democrats	Dominic Naylor	1,041	60.7	+22.6
Conservative	Karen Lyon-Brown	448	26.1	−19.6
Labour Co-op	Richard Millwood	225	13.1	+3.8
Majority		593	34.6	
Turnout		1,725	30.5	
Liberal Democrats hold		Swing	▲21.1	

=== Brizes & Doddinghurst ===
Brizes & Doddinghurst
Party	Candidate	Votes	%	±%
Conservative	Keith Parker	880	58.6	−7.7
Liberal Democrats	Hugh Gorton	485	32.3	+4.7
Labour	Kevin Brailey	136	9.1	+3.0
Majority		395	26.3	
Turnout		1,516	31.9	
Conservative hold		Swing	▼6.2	

=== Herongate, Ingrave & West Horndon ===
Herongate, Ingrave & West Horndon
Party	Candidate	Votes	%	±%
Conservative	Sheila Murphy	613	68.9	−1.7
Liberal Democrats	Anne Long	148	16.6	−4.3
Labour	Jane Winter	129	14.5	+5.9
Majority		465	52.3	
Turnout		896	29.0	
Conservative hold		Swing	▲1.3	

=== Hutton Central ===
Hutton Central
Party	Candidate	Votes	%	±%
Conservative	Mellissa Slade	573	59.4	−4.6
Liberal Democrats	Laura Carey	235	24.4	+1.2
Labour	Philip Holland	156	16.2	+3.4
Majority		338	35.0	
Turnout		973	32.4	
Conservative hold		Swing	▼2.9	

=== Hutton East ===
Hutton East
Party	Candidate	Votes	%	±%
Conservative	Olivia Sanders	442	54.8	−0.6
Liberal Democrats	Arthur Leathley	320	39.7	+18.7
Labour	Liam Preston	45	5.6	−17.9
Majority		122	15.1	
Turnout		812	27.1	
Conservative hold		Swing	▼9.7	

=== Hutton South ===
Hutton South
Party	Candidate	Votes	%	±%
Conservative	Roger Hirst	616	62.8	−10.0
Liberal Democrats	Alexander Carter	215	21.9	+13.0
Labour	Deborah Foster	150	15.3	+4.0
Majority		401	40.9	
Turnout		996	33.6	
Conservative hold		Swing	▼11.5	

=== Ingatestone, Fryerning & Mountnessing ===
Ingatestone, Fryerning & Mountnessing
Party	Candidate	Votes	%	±%
Liberal Democrats	Darryl Sankey	1,098	56.1	+18.8
Conservative	Jon Cloke	744	38.0	−12.3
Labour	Joanna Moncrieff	114	5.8	+1.2
Majority		354	18.1	
Turnout		1,969	39.1	
Liberal Democrats gain from Conservative		Swing	▲15.6	

=== Pilgrims Hatch ===
Pilgrims Hatch
Party	Candidate	Votes	%	±%
Liberal Democrats	Barry Aspinell	985	69.2	+10.5
Conservative	Gordon Cowley	305	21.4	−7.9
Labour	June Simmons	134	9.4	+0.8
Majority		680	47.8	
Turnout		1,437	31.3	
Liberal Democrats hold		Swing	▲9.2	

=== Shenfield ===
Shenfield
Party	Candidate	Votes	%	±%
Liberal Democrats	Nicola Cuthbert	879	47.6	+8.8
Conservative	Jan Pound	798	43.2	−5.8
Labour	Elizabeth Jerrard	90	4.9	−1.5
Green	Anne Milward	80	4.3	−1.6
Majority		81	4.4	
Turnout		1,853	43.7	
Liberal Democrats gain from Conservative		Swing	▲7.3	

=== South Weald ===
South Weald
Party	Candidate	Votes	%	±%
Conservative	Tom McLaren	314	49.0	−1.1
Liberal Democrats	Brenner Munden	289	45.1	+4.8
Labour	Francisca Dapp	38	5.9	−3.4
Majority		25	3.9	
Turnout		641	42.7	
Conservative hold		Swing	▼3.0	

=== Warley ===
Warley
Party	Candidate	Votes	%	±%
Liberal Democrats	Mark Haigh	1,016	62.0	+18.6
Conservative	Roger McCheyne	396	24.1	−18.1
Labour	Susan Kortlandt	156	9.5	−3.0
Green	Gregory Ince	72	4.4	New
Majority		620	37.9	
Turnout		1,653	33.5	
Liberal Democrats hold		Swing	▲18.4	
