= 2002 Brentwood Borough Council election =

Results of the 2002 Brentwood Borough Council election

Elections to Brentwood Borough Council were held on 2 May 2002. The entire council was up for election following boundary changes. The Liberal Democrats retained control of the council for a twelfth year.

== Election result ==
Brentwood Borough Council election result 2002
Party	Seats	Gains	Losses	Net gain/loss	Seats %	Votes %	Votes	+/−
Liberal Democrats	20				57.6	43.3	21,581	
Conservative	14				33.3	41.7	20,797	
Labour	2				6.1	10.9	5,434	
Liberal	1				3.0	1.9	954	
Independent Conservative	0				0.0	1.2	605	
Green	0				0.0	0.7	343	
Independent	0				0.0	0.3	142	

== Ward results ==
Brentwood Borough Council elections, 2002: Brentwood North
Party	Candidate	Votes	%	±%
Liberal Democrats	Barry Aspinell	808	52.4	
Liberal Democrats	Pauline Myers	782	50.7	
Liberal Democrats	Reg Straw	750	48.7	
Conservative	Margaret Hamilton	457	29.7	
Conservative	Adrian Hanwell	446	28.9	
Conservative	Gillian Alford	432	28.0	
Labour	Roy Goddard	195	12.7	
Labour	Mamtaz Beekoo	163	10.6	
Labour	Herbert Seymour	149	9.7	
Green	Frank Seckleman	148	9.7	
Majority		376	24.4	
Majority		336	21.8	
Majority		293	19.0	
Turnout		1,541	33.5	

Brentwood Borough Council elections, 2002: Brentwood South
Party	Candidate	Votes	%	±%
Labour	David Minns	619	41.3	
Labour	Colin Elphick	569	38.0	
Liberal Democrats	Margaret Hogan	541	36.1	
Labour	David Hann	489	32.6	
Conservative	Peter Adams	434	29.0	
Liberal Democrats	Paul Goodey	404	27.0	
Liberal Democrats	Denis Neal	379	25.3	
Conservative	Mark Waller	324	21.6	
Conservative	David Tan	300	20.0	
Independent	Matthew Howes	142	9.5	
Green	Anthony Stokes	93	6.2	
Majority		215	14.4	
Majority		135	9.0	
Majority		52	3.5	
Turnout		1,498	37.6	

Brentwood Borough Council elections, 2002: Brentwood West
Party	Candidate	Votes	%	±%
Liberal Democrats	David Kendall	777	58.6	
Liberal Democrats	Shirley Howe	741	55.9	
Liberal Democrats	Allan Wheatley	698	52.6	
Conservative	Peter Cullum	401	30.2	
Conservative	Joan Holmes	396	29.9	
Conservative	Kathryn Dean	390	29.4	
Labour	Sheila Maxey	126	9.5	
Labour	Graham Thompson	97	7.3	
Labour	Neil McAree	91	6.9	
Majority		387	29.2	
Majority		345	26.0	
Majority		297	22.4	
Turnout		1,326	33.9	

Brentwood Borough Council elections, 2002: Brizes & Doddinghurst
Party	Candidate	Votes	%	±%
Liberal Democrats	Victoria Cook	920	61.7	
Liberal Democrats	Derek Hardy	878	58.9	
Liberal Democrats	Colin Brown	849	56.9	
Conservative	Robin Maillard	377	25.3	
Conservative	David Williams	370	24.8	
Conservative	Janet Savill	368	24.7	
Labour	Martin Coule	161	10.8	
Labour	Peter Mayo	160	10.7	
Labour	Michele Wigram	159	10.7	
Majority		552	37.0	
Majority		508	34.1	
Majority		472	31.7	
Turnout		1,491	32.4	

Brentwood Borough Council elections, 2002: Herongate, Ingrave & West Horndon
Party	Candidate	Votes	%	±%
Conservative	Kenneth Wright	526	42.6	
Liberal	Roy Boggis	518	41.9	
Liberal	Sonya Barnes	436	35.3	
Conservative	Peter Ives	369	29.9	
Liberal Democrats	Linda Golding	163	13.2	
Liberal Democrats	Louise Siveter	140	11.3	
Labour	Anna Cadzow	65	5.3	
Labour	Brian Taylor	58	4.7	
Majority		90	7.3	
Majority		149	12.1	
Turnout		1,235	42.9	

Brentwood Borough Council elections, 2002: Hutton Central
Party	Candidate	Votes	%	±%
Conservative	Alan Braid	735	65.4	
Conservative	Jean McGinley	702	62.5	
Liberal Democrats	Marcia Collins	253	22.5	
Liberal Democrats	Donald Wallace	234	20.8	
Labour	Denise Abel	98	8.7	
Labour	Richard Burns	94	8.7	
Majority		501	44.6	
Majority		449	39.9	
Turnout		1,124	39.8	

Brentwood Borough Council elections, 2002: Hutton East
Party	Candidate	Votes	%	±%
Liberal Democrats	Alan Davies	443	44.7	
Liberal Democrats	Stephen Tilley	424	42.8	
Conservative	Sallyanne Latham	405	40.9	
Conservative	Christopher Hossack	391	39.5	
Labour	Charles Bisson	111	11.2	
Labour	William Harman	95	9.6	
Majority		52	5.3	
Majority		19	1.9	
Turnout		990	35.3	

Brentwood Borough Council elections, 2002: Hutton North
Party	Candidate	Votes	%	±%
Liberal Democrats	Peggy Freeman	553	44.8	
Conservative	Dudley Payne	540	43.8	
Conservative	Christopher Boyland	511	41.4	
Liberal Democrats	Paul Emanuel	498	40.4	
Labour	Jannetta McAllister	118	9.6	
Labour	Yvonne Waterhouse	100	8.1	
Majority		42	3.4	
Turnout		1,234	38.6	

Brentwood Borough Council elections, 2002: Hutton South
Party	Candidate	Votes	%	±%
Conservative	Brandon Lewis	623	67.1	
Conservative	Francis Kenny	603	65.0	
Liberal Democrats	Roberta Hall	207	22.3	
Liberal Democrats	Mark Long	203	21.8	
Labour	Malcolm Burgess	60	6.5	
Majority		420	45.3	
Majority		396	42.7	
Turnout		928	31.1	

Brentwood Borough Council elections, 2002: Ingatestone, Fryerning & Mountnessing
Party	Candidate	Votes	%	±%
Conservative	Richard Harrison	1,190	55.6	
Conservative	Anthony Sleep	1,143	53.4	
Conservative	Sarah Courage	1,095	51.2	
Liberal Democrats	Jacqueline Anslow	788	36.8	
Liberal Democrats	David Gottesmann	780	36.4	
Liberal Democrats	Stewart Porter	665	31.1	
Labour	Richard Abel	120	5.6	
Labour	Cornelius Maxey	114	5.3	
Labour	Vicki Hann	106	5.0	
Green	Beryl Lankester	102	4.8	
Majority		525	24.5	
Majority		363	17.0	
Majority		307	14.3	
Turnout		2,140	46.4	

Brentwood Borough Council elections, 2002: Pilgrims Hatch
Party	Candidate	Votes	%	±%
Liberal Democrats	Henry Bailey	968	59.0	
Liberal Democrats	Anne Long	957	58.3	
Liberal Democrats	Charles Myers	911	55.5	
Conservative	Ann Parrish	449	27.3	
Conservative	Susan Miers	446	27.2	
Conservative	Michael Parrish	427	26.0	
Labour	Jennifer Callaghan	167	10.2	
Labour	Richard Bingley	152	9.3	
Labour	Lynn Turner	129	7.9	
Majority		541	32.9	
Majority		511	31.1	
Majority		462	28.1	
Turnout		1,642	36.0	

Brentwood Borough Council elections, 2002: Shenfield
Party	Candidate	Votes	%	±%
Conservative	Peter Franklin	964	59.7	
Conservative	Margaret Brehaut	876	54.2	
Conservative	Philip Baker	767	47.5	
Independent Conservative	Anthony Galbraith	605	37.5	
Liberal Democrats	Max Gottesmann	337	20.9	
Liberal Democrats	Doris Suckling	313	19.4	
Liberal Democrats	Tracey Taylor	292	18.1	
Labour	Bernadette Pavitt	124	7.7	
Labour	Doreen Acton	118	7.3	
Labour	Ian Wands	81	5.0	
Majority		651	40.3	
Majority		539	33.4	
Majority		162	10.0	
Turnout		1,615	39.1	

Brentwood Borough Council elections, 2002: South Weald
Party	Candidate	Votes	%	±%
Liberal Democrats	James Shawcross	626	74.2	
Conservative	John Shelton	207	24.5	
Labour	Jane Winter	11	1.3	
Majority		419	49.6	
Turnout		844	58.4	

Brentwood Borough Council elections, 2002: Tipps Cross
Party	Candidate	Votes	%	±%
Conservative	Dominic Good	630	49.5	
Conservative	Madeline Henwood	606	47.6	
Liberal Democrats	Alastair Wakeley	546	42.9	
Liberal Democrats	Leonard Harley	480	37.7	
Labour	Rita Anderson	75	5.9	
Labour	Robert Gow	73	5.7	
Majority		150	11.8	
Majority		60	4.7	
Turnout		1,274	42.4	

Brentwood Borough Council elections, 2002: Warley
Party	Candidate	Votes	%	±%
Liberal Democrats	Michael Taylor	790	48.3	
Liberal Democrats	Robert Barr	764	46.7	
Liberal Democrats	Jill Hubbard	719	43.9	
Conservative	David Sparks	666	40.7	
Conservative	Lionel Lee	629	38.4	
Conservative	Steven Richmond	602	36.8	
Labour	Thomas Acton	144	8.8	
Labour	Peter Anderson	125	7.6	
Labour	Susan Kortlandt	118	7.2	
Majority		188	11.5	
Majority		135	8.2	
Majority		53	3.2	
Turnout		1,637	37.6	
