= Blackmore, Hook End and Wyatts Green =

- Civil parish
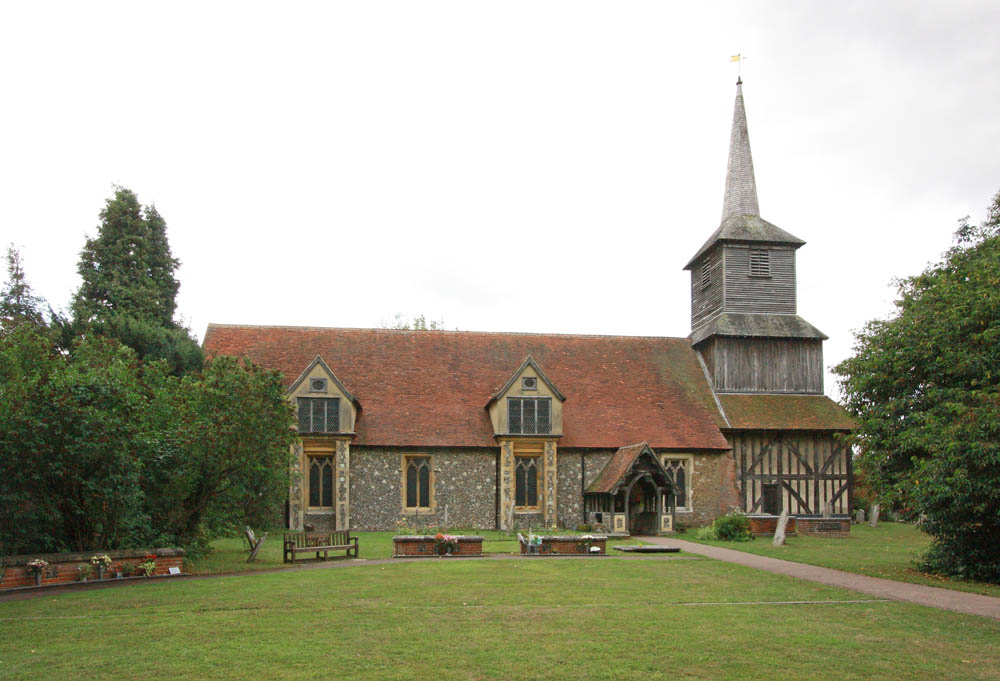
- St Lawrence's Church, Blackmore
- Interactive map of Blackmore, Hook End and Wyatts Green
- Coordinates: 51.68°N 0.31°E
- Country: England
- Primary council: Brentwood
- County: Essex
- Region: East of England
- Status: Parish

Government
  - UK Parliament: Brentwood and Ongar

Population (2021)
  - Total: 3,087

Blackmore, Hook End and Wyatts Green is a civil parish in the Borough of Brentwood in Essex, England. The parish includes the village of Blackmore and the settlements of Hook End and Wyatts Green; the latter two are now both classed as part of the built up area of Doddinghurst. At the 2021 census the parish had a population of 3,087.

== History ==
The parish was historically just called Blackmore after the original main village in the parish. Following the significant growth of the former hamlets of Hook End and Wyatts Green, the parish was renamed to "Blackmore, Hook End and Wyatts Green" on 30 September 1998.

Hook End and Wyatts Green are now both classed as part of the built up area of the neighbouring village of Doddinghurst by the Office for National Statistics.

== Governance ==
There are three tiers of local government, at parish, district, and county level: Blackmore, Hook End and Wyatts Green Parish Council, Brentwood Borough Council, and Essex County Council. The parish council is based at the Tipps Cross Remembrance Hall on Blackmore Road in Hook End.
