= 2023 Brentwood Borough Council election =

2023 UK local government election

← 2022	4 May 2023	2024 →

13 out of 37 seats to Brentwood Borough Council 19 seats needed for a majority

	First party	Second party
Leader	Barry Aspinell	Chris Hossack
Party	Liberal Democrats	Conservative
Last election	13 seats, 40.9%	20 seats, 41.6%
Seats before	14	19
Seats won	7	4
Seats after	17	17
Seat change	▲3	▼3
Popular vote	7,149	6,140
Percentage	43.7%	37.5%
Swing	▼1.6%	▼2.2%
	Third party	Fourth party
Leader	Tim Barrett
Party	Labour	Independent
Last election	3 seats, 10.5%	1 seat, 2.8%
Seats before	2	1
Seats won	1	0
Seats after	2	1
Seat change	Steady	Steady
Popular vote	2,342	389
Percentage	14.3%	2.4%
Swing	▲0.7%	N/A
- Winner of each seat at the 2023 Brentwood Borough Council election
Leader before election
Chris Hossack
Conservative
Leader after election
Barry Aspinell
Liberal Democrat
No overall control

The 2023 Brentwood Borough Council election took place on 4 May 2023 to elect members of Brentwood Borough Council in Essex, England. This was on the same day as other local elections in England.

Prior to the election the Conservatives had a majority on the council. The leader of the council before the election, Chris Hossack, chose not to stand for re-election.

Following the election, the council went under no overall control. A Liberal Democrat and Labour coalition formed to take control of the council, with Liberal Democrat leader Barry Aspinell being confirmed as the new leader of the council at the subsequent annual meeting on 17 May 2023. Will Russell took over as the new leader of the Conservative group in opposition.

== Summary ==
=== Election result ===
2023 Brentwood Borough Council election
Party	This election			Full council			This election		
Party	Seats	Net	Seats %	Other	Total	Total %	Votes	Votes %	+/−
Liberal Democrats	8	▲3	61.5	9	17	45.9	7,149	43.7	–1.6
Conservative	4	▼3	30.8	13	17	45.9	6,140	37.5	–2.2
Labour	1	Steady	7.7	1	2	5.4	2,342	14.3	+0.7
Independent	0	Steady	0.0	1	1	2.7	389	2.4	N/A
Green	0	Steady	0.0	0	0	0.0	289	1.8	+0.6
Reform UK	0	Steady	0.0	0	0	0.0	64	0.4	+0.2

== Ward results ==
The Statement of Persons Nominated, which details the candidates standing in each ward, was released by Brentwood Borough Council following the close of nomination on 5 April 2023. The results of the election were announced on 5 May 2023.

=== Brentwood North ===
Brentwood North
Party	Candidate	Votes	%	±%
Liberal Democrats	Mark Lewis*	945	62.1	+5.0
Conservative	Sat Lal	286	18.8	–4.7
Labour	Eleanor Brown	204	13.4	+3.3
Green	Adam Oliver	87	5.7	–3.7
Majority		659	43.3	+7.9
Turnout		1,528	28.2	–2.1
Registered electors		5,401		
Liberal Democrats hold		Swing	▲4.9	

=== Brentwood South ===
Brentwood South
Party	Candidate	Votes	%	±%
Labour	Tim Barrett*	796	55.8	+1.4
Conservative	Adam Chinnery	370	25.9	–3.1
Liberal Democrats	Arthur Leathley	261	18.3	+1.7
Majority		426	29.9	+4.5
Turnout		1,431	30.1	–1.8
Registered electors		4,743		
Labour hold		Swing	▲2.3	

=== Brentwood West ===
Brentwood West
Party	Candidate	Votes	%	±%
Liberal Democrats	Steve Mayo	929	61.4	+0.7
Conservative	Thomas Rayner	339	22.4	–3.7
Labour Co-op	Richard Millwood	245	16.2	+3.1
Majority		590	39.0	+4.4
Turnout		1,521	26.7	–3.8
Registered electors		5,693		
Liberal Democrats hold		Swing	▲2.2	

=== Brizes & Doddinghurst ===
Brizes & Doddinghurst
Party	Candidate	Votes	%	±%
Conservative	Cliff Poppy	891	64.6	+6.0
Liberal Democrats	Florina Constanda	259	18.8	–13.5
Labour	Kevin Brailey	141	10.2	+1.1
Green	Paul Jeater	88	6.4	N/A
Majority		632	45.8	+19.5
Turnout		1,386	29.2	–2.7
Registered electors		4,745		
Conservative hold		Swing	▲9.8	

=== Herongate, Ingrave & West Horndon ===
Herongate, Ingrave & West Horndon
Party	Candidate	Votes	%	±%
Conservative	Fiona Marsh	595	67.8	–1.1
Liberal Democrats	Anne Long	167	19.0	+2.4
Labour	Jane Winter	116	13.2	–1.3
Majority		428	48.8	–3.5
Turnout		3,080	28.7	–0.3
Registered electors		885		
Conservative hold		Swing	▼1.8	

=== Hutton East ===
Hutton East
Party	Candidate	Votes	%	±%
Liberal Democrats	Benjamin Rigby	448	49.1	+9.4
Conservative	Jay Patel	324	35.5	–19.3
Labour Co-op	Susan Kortlandt	140	15.4	+9.8
Majority		124	13.6	N/A
Turnout		921	30.9	+3.8
Registered electors		2,975		
Liberal Democrats gain from Conservative		Swing	▲14.4	

=== Hutton North ===
Hutton North
Party	Candidate	Votes	%	±%
Conservative	Jan Pound	493	53.4	–15.0
Labour	Philip Holland	212	23.0	+9.8
Liberal Democrats	Laura Carey	154	16.7	–1.7
Reform UK	Paul Godfrey	64	6.9	N/A
Majority		281	30.4	–19.6
Turnout		929	29.3	–5.5
Registered electors		3,166		
Conservative hold		Swing	▼12.4	

=== Ingatestone, Fryerning & Mountnessing ===
Ingatestone, Fryerning & Mountnessing
Party	Candidate	Votes	%	±%
Liberal Democrats	Hugh Gorton	911	51.9	–4.2
Conservative	Noelle Hones*	745	42.5	+4.5
Labour	Joanna Moncrieff	98	5.6	–0.2
Majority		166	9.4	–8.7
Turnout		1,770	35.5	–3.6
Registered electors		4,983		
Liberal Democrats gain from Conservative		Swing	▼4.4	

=== Pilgrims Hatch ===
Pilgrims Hatch
Party	Candidate	Votes	%	±%
Liberal Democrats	Vicky Davies	956	72.7	+3.5
Conservative	Gordon Cowley	214	16.3	–5.1
Labour	Cameron Ball	114	8.7	–0.7
Green	David Hale	31	2.4	N/A
Majority		742	56.4	+8.6
Turnout		1,320	28.8	–2.5
Registered electors		4,569		
Liberal Democrats hold		Swing	▲4.3	

=== Shenfield ===
Shenfield
Party	Candidate	Votes	%	±%
Liberal Democrats	David Worsfold	890	50.9	+3.3
Conservative	Thomas Gordon	710	40.6	–2.6
Green	Ann Milward	94	5.4	+1.1
Labour	Elizabeth Jerrard	56	3.2	–1.7
Majority		180	10.3	+5.9
Turnout		1,754	41.4	–2.3
Registered electors		4,235		
Liberal Democrats hold		Swing	▲3.0	

=== South Weald ===
South Weald (by-election)
Party	Candidate	Votes	%	±%
Liberal Democrats	Brenner Munden	359	64.0	+18.9
Conservative	Jon Cloke	170	30.3	–18.7
Labour	Samuel Andreetti	32	5.7	–0.2
Majority		189	33.7	N/A
Turnout		562	37.2	–5.5
Registered electors		1,508		
Liberal Democrats gain from Conservative		Swing	▲18.8	

=== Tipps Cross ===
Tipps Cross
Party	Candidate	Votes	%	±%
Conservative	Roger McCheyne	553	54.0	+4.8
Independent	Brent Smith	389	38.0	N/A
Labour	Thomas Acton	82	8.0	+3.8
Majority		164	16.0	+13.4
Turnout		1,028	32.7	–10.6
Registered electors		3,138		
Conservative hold		Swing	N/A	

=== Warley ===
Warley
Party	Candidate	Votes	%	±%
Liberal Democrats	Jay Laplain	870	57.9	–4.1
Conservative	Jason Gibson	450	30.0	+5.9
Labour	Malcolm Burgess	106	7.1	–2.4
Green	Julian Goode	76	5.1	+0.7
Majority		420	27.9	–10.0
Turnout		1,567	31.3	–2.2
Registered electors		4,993		
Liberal Democrats hold		Swing	▼5.0	
