= Michael Reid (evangelist) =

English Pentecostal minister (1943–2023)

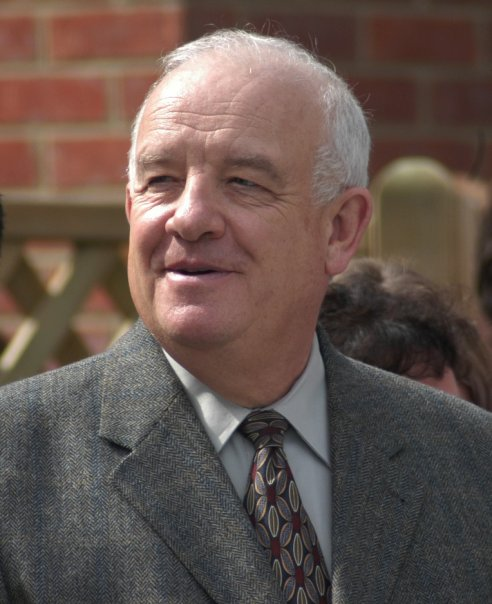
Michael Reid

Michael Stafford Baynes Reid (15 May 1943 – 13 January 2023) was an English Christian evangelist in Essex. Also known as Bishop Michael Reid, he was the founder of the Peniel Pentecostal Church (aka Michael Reid Ministries), and ran high-profile advertisements in the press promoting the church.

== Biography ==
Reid had been described in the press as a "Mercedes-driving former policeman" who "made millions by selling insurance policies to the faithful", and advertised miracle healings although a 1999 investigation by the Advertising Standards Authority was unable to substantiate the claims.

Advertisements in the press usually described him as "Bishop Michael Reid" in the International Communion of Charismatic Churches. He was no longer associated with this group, but he continued to use this title on social media sites.

Reid was the author and co-author of several books and a founder member of the Christian Congress for Traditional Values (CCTV) to monitor challenges to family life and traditional belief in the UK. He was also a figure in the organisation's campaign challenging the BBC over its decision to screen Jerry Springer - The Opera on television.

In April 2008, Reid admitted to an extramarital sexual relationship and resigned from the leadership of Peniel Pentecostal Church.

Reid died on 13 January 2023, at the age of 79.
