= 2021 Brentwood Borough Council election =

2021 UK local government election

2021 Brentwood Borough Council Election
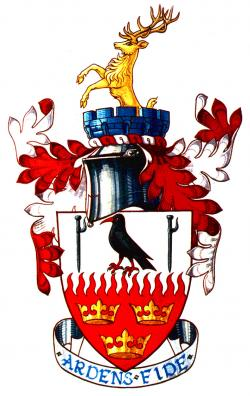
← 2019	6 May 2021	2022 →

12 of the 37 seats to Brentwood Borough Council 19 seats needed for a majority
	First party	Second party	Third party
Party	Conservative	Liberal Democrats	Labour
Seats before	20	13	3
Seats won	9	3	0
Seats after	23	12	2
Seat change	▲3	▼1	▼1
Popular vote	9,443	6,092	2,185
Percentage	49.1%	31.7%	11.4%
	Fourth party
Party	Independent
Seats before	1
Seats won	0
Seats after	0
Seat change	▼1
Popular vote	638
Percentage	3.3%
- Winner in each ward for the 2021 Brentwood Borough Council election
Council control before election
Conservatives
Council control after election
Conservatives

The 2021 Brentwood Borough Council election took place on 6 May 2021 to elect members of Brentwood Borough Council in England. This was on the same day as other local elections.

== Results summary ==
2021 Brentwood Borough Council election
Party	This election			Full council			This election		
Party	Seats	Net	Seats %	Other	Total	Total %	Votes	Votes %	+/−
Conservative	9	▲3	75.0	14	23	62.2	9,443	49.1	+7.5
Liberal Democrats	3	▼1	25.0	9	12	32.4	6,092	31.7	-9.2
Labour	0	▼1	0.0	2	2	5.4	2,185	11.4	+0.9
Green	0	Steady	0.0	0	0	0.0	743	3.9	+0.6
Independent	0	▼1	0.0	0	0	0.0	638	3.3	+0.5
Reform UK	0	Steady	0.0	0	0	0.0	112	0.6	New

== Ward results ==
=== Brentwood North ===
Brentwood North
Party	Candidate	Votes	%	±%
Liberal Democrats	Alison Fulcher	748	42.5	−14.5
Conservative	April Goulding	544	30.9	+7.4
Green	Kelda Boothroyd	232	13.2	+3.8
Labour	Oliver Durose	191	10.9	+0.8
Reform UK	Robert Prince	45	2.6	New
Majority		204	11.6	−21.9
Turnout		1,774	32.5	+3.5
Liberal Democrats hold		Swing	▼11.0	

=== Brentwood South ===
Brentwood South
Party	Candidate	Votes	%	±%
Conservative	Andy Wiles	665	40.3	+4.1
Labour	Susan Kortlandt	655	39.7	−0.8
Liberal Democrats	Brenner Munden	330	20.0	−3.2
Majority		10	0.6	N/A
Turnout		1,666	35.5	+6.5
Conservative gain from Labour		Swing	▲2.5	

=== Brentwood West ===
Brentwood West
Party	Candidate	Votes	%	±%
Conservative	Will Russell	883	45.7	+7.7
Liberal Democrats	Karen Chilvers	737	38.1	−10.1
Labour	Deborah Foster	180	9.3	+2.1
Green	Janice Gearon-Simm	99	5.1	−1.6
Reform UK	Dave Conway	33	1.7	New
Majority		146	7.6	N/A
Turnout		1,944	34.1	+3.1
Conservative gain from Liberal Democrats		Swing	▲8.9	

=== Brizes & Doddinghurst ===
Brizes & Doddinghurst
Party	Candidate	Votes	%	±%
Conservative	Christine Gelderbloem	1,165	66.3	+10.6
Liberal Democrats	Hugh Gorton	485	27.6	−10.9
Labour	Kevin Brailey	108	6.1	+0.3
Majority		680	38.7	+21.5
Turnout		1,763	36.8	5.8
Conservative hold		Swing	▲10.8	

=== Hutton Central ===
Hutton Central
Party	Candidate	Votes	%	±%
Conservative	Garry White	698	64.0	−7.0
Liberal Democrats	Laura Carey	253	23.2	+9.5
Labour	Philip Holland	139	12.8	−2.5
Majority		445	40.8	
Turnout		1,102	36.8	
Conservative hold		Swing	▼8.3	

=== Hutton North ===
Hutton North
Party	Candidate	Votes	%	±%
Conservative	Keith Barber	756	68.4	+6.8
Liberal Democrats	Taylor Higgins	204	18.4	−5.2
Labour	Liam Preston	146	13.2	−1.6
Majority		552	50.0	+12.0
Turnout		1,120	34.8	+3.8
Conservative hold		Swing	▲6.0	

=== Hutton South ===
Hutton South
Party	Candidate	Votes	%	±%
Conservative	Mark Reed	829	72.8	−3.2
Labour	Jane Winter	129	11.3	−2.6
Liberal Democrats	Alexander Carter	101	8.9	−1.2
Green	Karen Smith	80	7.0	New
Majority		700	61.5	
Turnout		1,149	38.0	
Conservative hold		Swing	▼0.3	

=== Ingatestone, Fryerning & Mountnessing ===
Ingatestone, Fryerning & Mountnessing
Party	Candidate	Votes	%	±%
Conservative	Lesley Wagland	1,030	50.3	+5.0
Liberal Democrats	Darryl Sankey	763	37.3	−4.0
Green	Paul Jeater	159	7.8	−1.1
Labour	Joanna Moncrieff	94	4.6	±0.0
Majority		267	13.0	+9.0
Turnout		2,058	40.4	+3.4
Conservative hold		Swing	▲4.5	

=== Pilgrims Hatch ===
Pilgrims Hatch
Party	Candidate	Votes	%	±%
Liberal Democrats	David Kendall	913	58.7	−12.8
Conservative	Kelly Herbert	455	29.3	+8.3
Labour	Cameron Ball	134	8.6	+1.1
Green	John Hamilton	53	3.4	New
Majority		458	29.4	−21.5
Turnout		1,564	33.6	+1.6
Liberal Democrats hold		Swing	▼10.6	

=== Shenfield ===
Shenfield
Party	Candidate	Votes	%	±%
Conservative	Thomas Heard	997	49.0	+6.7
Liberal Democrats	Gary MacDonnell	789	38.8	−15.1
Labour	Elizabeth Jerrard	130	6.4	+2.6
Green	Anne Milward	120	5.9	New
Majority		208	10.2	−1.4
Turnout		2,052	47.1	+3.1
Conservative hold		Swing	▲10.9	

=== Tipps Cross ===
Tipps Cross
Party	Candidate	Votes	%	±%
Conservative	Thomas Bridge	673	49.2	−3.0
Independent	Roger Keeble	638	46.6	+3.8
Labour	Thomas Acton	57	4.2	−0.8
Majority		35	2.6	−6.8
Turnout		1,371	43.3	+8.3
Conservative gain from Independent		Swing	▼3.4	

=== Warley ===
Warley
Party	Candidate	Votes	%	±%
Liberal Democrats	Martin Cuthbert	769	43.4	−6.3
Conservative	Jason Gibson	748	42.2	+16.1
Labour	Richard Millwood	222	12.5	+5.8
Reform UK	William Hughes	34	1.9	New
Majority		21	1.2	−22.4
Turnout		1,781	36.0	+4.0
Liberal Democrats hold		Swing	▼11.2	
