= Trinity Church (Brentwood) =

Coordinates: 51.6397°N 0.2708°E

Trinity Church (formerly Peniel Pentecostal Church) is a church in Pilgrims Hatch in England. The church was founded by Michael Reid, who served as pastor of the church until stepping down in 2008, following various controversies.

== Doctrine ==
Peniel Church described itself as an independent Pentecostal Christian church. Over the years, it aligned itself with and subsequently distanced itself from a number of Christian organisations, including the Assemblies of God and the International Communion of Charismatic Churches (ICCC). For a time the church was a member of the Evangelical Alliance (EA), but disputes between the EA and the leadership of the church resulted in the church leaving the EA. Under the new leadership, it has now been welcomed back into the EA.

Due to the patriarchal values of the church, women in the Peniel Church were obliged to dress in clothes that were seen as 'feminine', such as dresses and skirts.

== Leadership ==
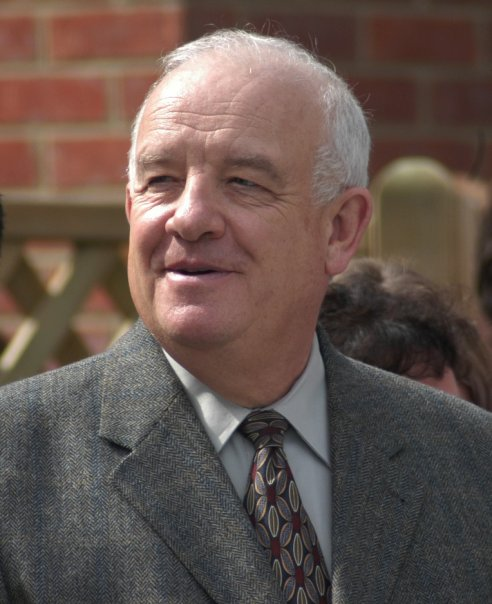
Michael Reid

The church's founder, Michael Reid, was a former Metropolitan police officer and insurance salesman, and was made a bishop by the International Communion of Charismatic Churches in Benin City, Nigeria in 1995. The Rev Peter Linnecar, Reid's senior pastor, and long-time business partner for more than 25 years, took over Mr Reid's responsibilities at the church during 2008. A group of eight lay-people act as the leadership team, while a further group of trustees has legal responsibility for the church's charitable status.

== Controversy ==
Controversy has surrounded Reid for many years and both he and Peniel Pentecostal Church have been the subject of many critical media articles. In 2001, the church received national publicity when Martin Bell stood for Parliament for Brentwood and Ongar constituency following allegations that the church were attempting to infiltrate the local Conservative Party. The allegations were investigated by Conservative Central Office who reported that they saw no evidence of entryism.

Some former church members have claimed the church is a cult, and relate experiences of poor treatment prior to and on their departure from the organisation. In 2004, all the other churches in the Brentwood and District Evangelical Fellowship (BADEF) resigned in protest against Peniel, leaving it as the only member.

In February 2008 the Advertising Standards Authority upheld a complaint that a mobile advertisement for Christian Congress of Traditional Values (CCTV), an organisation with ties to Peniel Pentecostal Church, was "likely to cause serious or widespread offence or condone anti-social behaviour". The advertisement bore the slogan "Gay aim: abolish the family", implying that gay people were against the institution of the family and family values.

Peniel Church had more lately been publicised as 'Michael Reid Ministries', although the church retained the Peniel name for its college, school and choir. The college was closed in 2009.

== Crisis ==
The church was temporarily thrown into crisis when it came to light that Reid had been having an affair with a member of the choir. On 5 April 2008, Michael Reid tendered his resignation from the church board and stepped down from pastoral duties. At an industrial tribunal where Reid was claiming unfair dismissal it emerged that there was a second woman who also claimed to have had a relationship of "many years" with Reid, which involved a "possible abuse of his position. Following these events, CCTV disbanded in August 2008, and Global Gospel Fellowship (GGF) appears to have likewise folded. Reid was arrested on 27 August 2009 on suspicion of historical rape. Further to the exposure of the affair, stories of emotional bullying and manipulation by Reid began to emerge from many members of the congregation.

The church appeared to have weathered the storm caused by Reid's extra-marital affairs, but trouble flared up again in 2009 when head pastor Peter Linnecar's appointment of assistant pastors caused controversy and disagreement amongst a large section of the congregation. Approximately 300 people left the church as a result. The church, now called Trinity Church, subsequently stated that it is now thriving under the new leadership.

== See also ==
- Brentwood and Ongar Independent Conservative Party
