= Doddinghurst =

Village in Essex, England

Coordinates: 51.6635°N 0.3043°E

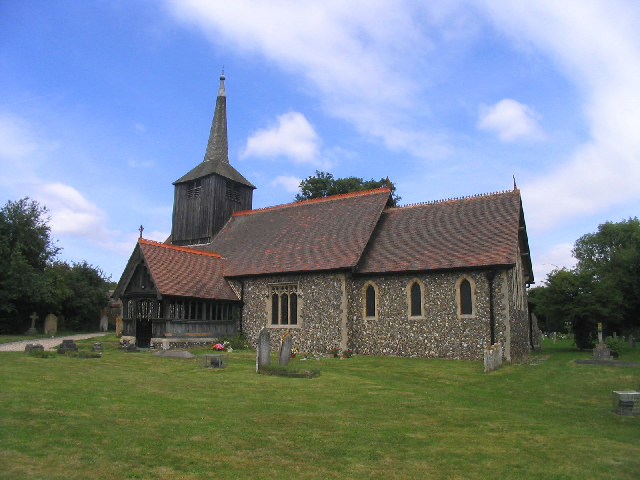
- All Saints Church, Doddinghurst

- Location within Essex
- Interactive map of Doddinghurst
- Population: 2,758 (Parish, 2021); 4,121 (Built up area, 2021)
- OS grid reference: TQ593986
- Civil parish: Doddinghurst
- District: Brentwood
- Shire county: Essex
- Region: East
- Country: England
- Sovereign state: United Kingdom
- Post town: BRENTWOOD
- Postcode district: CM15
- Dialling code: 01277
- Police: Essex
- Fire: Essex
- Ambulance: East of England
- UK Parliament: Brentwood and Ongar
- Website: Doddinghurst Parish Council

Doddinghurst is a village and civil parish in the Borough of Brentwood in Essex, England. It is 3 miles (5 km) north of Brentwood. At the 2021 census the parish had a population of 2,758, and the Doddinghurst built up area as defined by the Office for National Statistics (which extends beyond the parish boundary to include Hook End and Wyatts Green) had a population of 4,121.

== History ==
The village was recorded in the Domesday Book as Doddenhenc, an Anglo-Saxon name meaning "the wood of Dudda or of his people". The modern form of the village name was established by the 13th century.

The Church, All Saints, and its associated Priest House are charming historical buildings and are clearly visible on Church Lane. The Church has a 13th-century nave and south doorway with other aspects added or improved during the 15th and 17th centuries with a major restoration in 1886 including the rebuilding of the chancel.

== The village today ==
The village is based around a pair of main roads, Doddinghurst Road (from Brentwood to Doddinghurst) and Church Lane (forming part of an overall road circling from Kelvedon Hatch which also runs through Hook End and Wyatts Green) intersecting at the north end of the village. The village's amenities include a pair of closely linked schools (Doddinghurst Infant School and Doddinghurst CofE Junior School), All Saints Church dating back to the 13th century, the Kervan Kitchen restaurant (formerly the Willow pub) and a village hall. There is a scout hut (for the 1st Doddinghurst Scout Troup) located towards the back of the playing fields in the north of the village.

There is a small group of shops near the village hall and church at the north end of the village (including a newsagent, a barber, a beauty salon, a pharmacy and an off-licence), while on Church Lane there is an estate agent, a barbers and a fish bar. Half a mile away (towards the geographical centre of the village), is a Post Office.

The Village Hall is opposite All Saints Church in Church Lane. Adjoining the Village Hall are the office and committee rooms of Doddinghurst Parish Council who own and manage the major amenities of the Village, which include children's play areas and spaces such as Peartree Field. In addition to recreational space the Parish Council manage the Burial Ground at the rear of All Saints Church and Garden Allotments off Mountnessing Lane. Behind the Village Hall there are several large playing fields where Village events are held every two years in aid of local charitable organizations and other celebrations such as Village Fun Days that have been organized and funded by the Parish Council. The local Football Club make regular use of the Parish Council playing fields and the Village Hall playing field.

The village has a new Doctors' surgery located near Deal Tree Corner with four or five doctors and several nurses that also supports the surrounding villages. The village is set in a rural farming environment with pleasant fields and small deciduous woods, many of which are connected by a network of gently undulating public footpaths. The River Wid runs through the village, along with a number of its tributaries.

Much of the village has been built or redeveloped from 1950 onward although it remains a largely rural community with much of the area given over to arable agriculture.

On 17 September 2007 Doddinghurst Parish Council received Quality Status under the UK's Department for Environment, Food and Rural Affairs (DEFRA) scheme designed to enhance the relationship between the local community and local governance. In November 2009 the Parish Council became eligible, and adopted, the Power of Well-Being which significantly improves its ability to spend money on matters benefitting either the social, or economic or environmental benefit of the community.

The village has significant areas of land for recreational use other than the playing field behind the Village Hall, including the Peartree Recreational Field (opposite the Post Office), while the junior school has a large field and woodland attached.

The built up area of Doddinghurst as defined by the Office for National Statistics now extends beyond the parish boundary to take in Hook End and Wyatts Green, both of which form part of the parish of Blackmore, Hook End and Wyatts Green.

== Transport ==
The village is located a short distance away from the A128

The nearest train stations are Shenfield and Brentwood

The village is served by bus routes 61, 431, 473 and 483, all operated by NIBSbuses.

== Notable people ==
- Lewis Brindley, YouTuber and Yogscast co-founder
