= Hutton, Essex =

Area in Essex, England

Coordinates: 51.630°N 0.358°E

Hutton
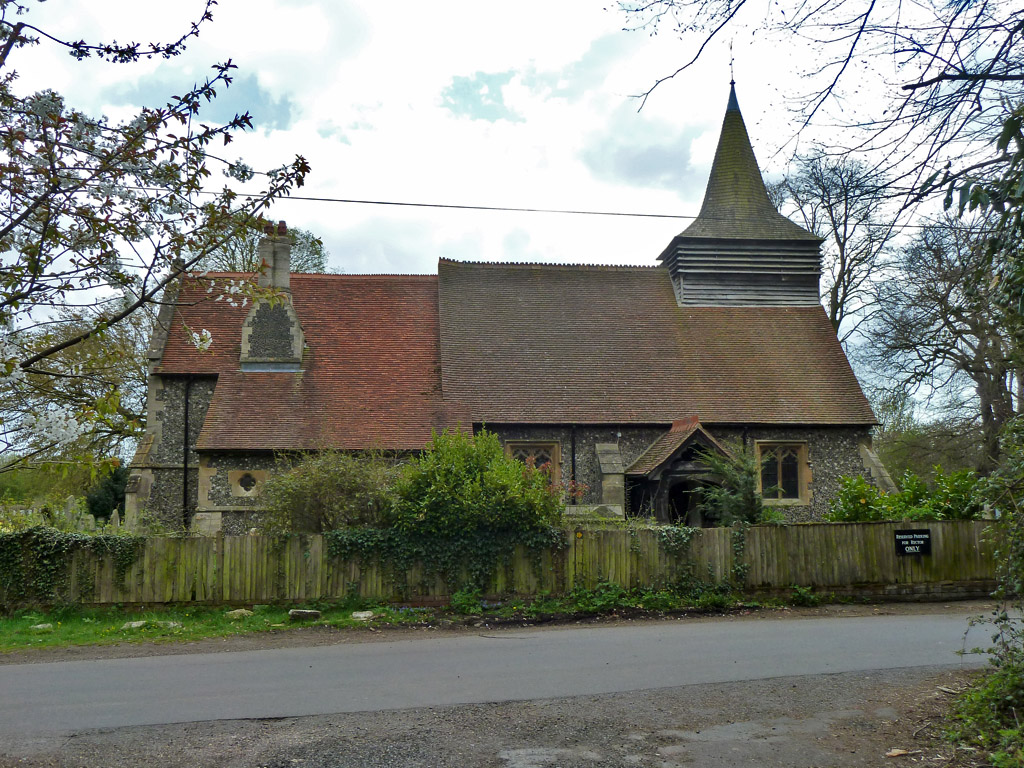
- All Saints' Church

- Location within Essex
- OS grid reference: TQ631950
- District: Brentwood
- Shire county: Essex
- Region: East
- Country: England
- Sovereign state: United Kingdom
- Post town: BRENTWOOD
- Postcode district: CM13
- Dialling code: 01277
- Police: Essex
- Fire: Essex
- Ambulance: East of England
- UK Parliament: Brentwood and Ongar

Hutton is a suburb of Brentwood, in Essex, England. It lies 3 miles (5 km) east of the town centre, on the eastern edge of the built up area. The area is split between modest housing estates and the largely affluent Hutton Mount. Hutton was formerly a separate village and parish. The civil parish was abolished in 1934 and absorbed into Brentwood. It has good transport links to Central London (around 20 miles (32 km) to the south-west) via Shenfield railway station which is just 1 mile (1.6 km) from Hutton.

== History ==
The name Hutton means the farm or settlement on a hill spur.

Hutton appears in the Domesday Book of 1086 when it had 24 households and was owned by Battle Abbey in Sussex. No church or priest was explicitly mentioned at Hutton in the Domesday Book, but it came to be a parish. The parish church, dedicated to All Saints, dates back to the early 14th century, although it was largely rebuilt in 1873.

The first police officer of the Essex Constabulary to be killed whilst on active duty was Robert Bambrough, who was drowned in a pond in Hutton by the criminal whom he was escorting from Billericay Magistrates' Court on 21 November 1850.

Hutton was an ancient parish in the Barstable Hundred of Essex. When elected parish and district councils were established in 1894, the parish of Hutton was included in the Billericay Rural District. In 1934 Hutton and other areas, including neighbouring Shenfield, were absorbed into the urban district of Brentwood. At the 1931 census (the last before the abolition of the civil parish), Hutton had a population of 2,142.

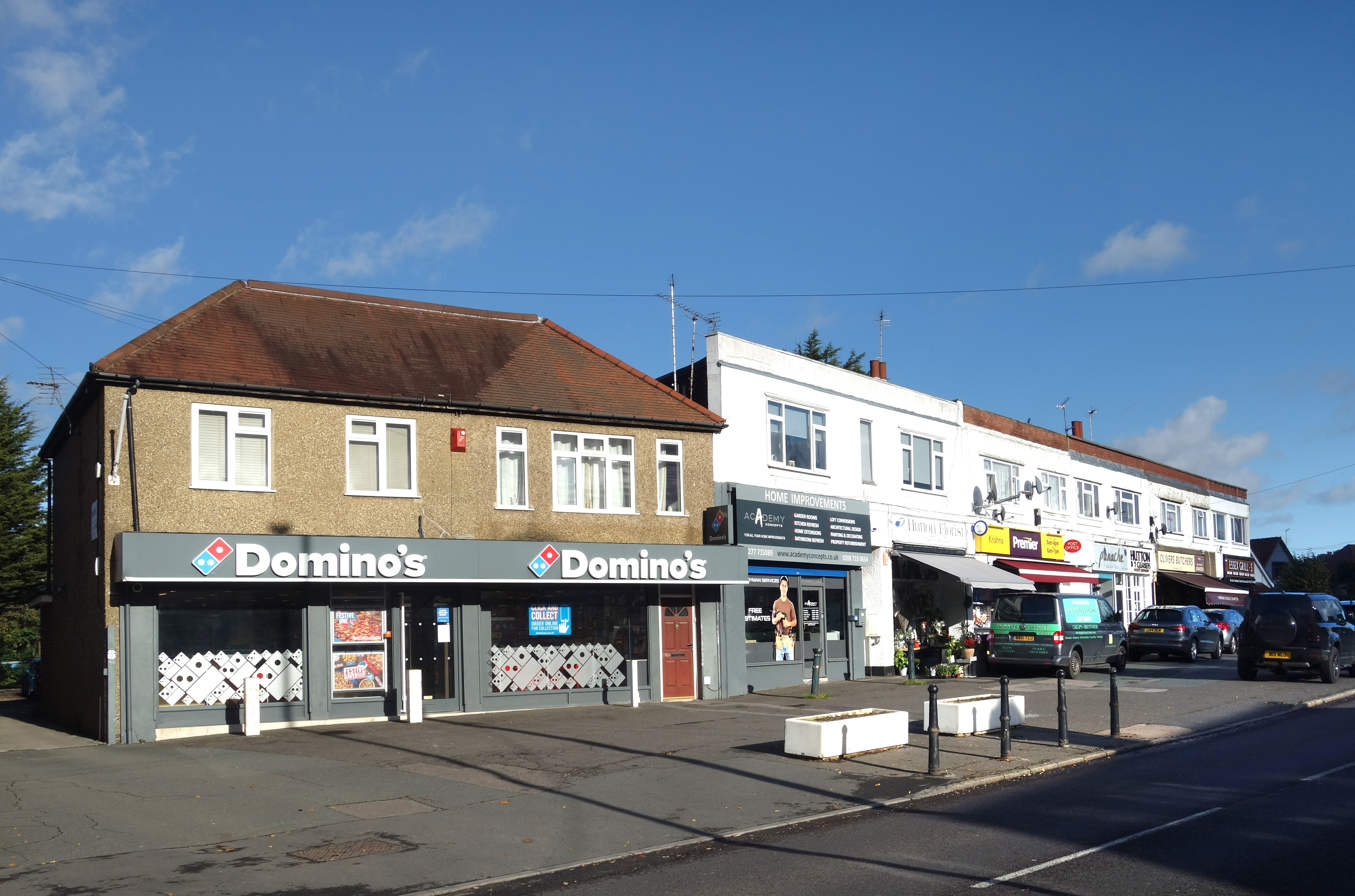
Local shops on Rayleigh Road

Hutton has been administered as part of Brentwood since 1934. The area to the west of the old village of Hutton has been developed with various housing estates and other development and is served by a number of parades of shops, particularly along Rayleigh Road. Hutton and neighbouring Shenfield are classed as part of the Brentwood built up area by the Office for National Statistics. The older part of Hutton village around Hutton Hall and All Saints' Church was designated a conservation area in 1986.

== Hutton Poplars ==
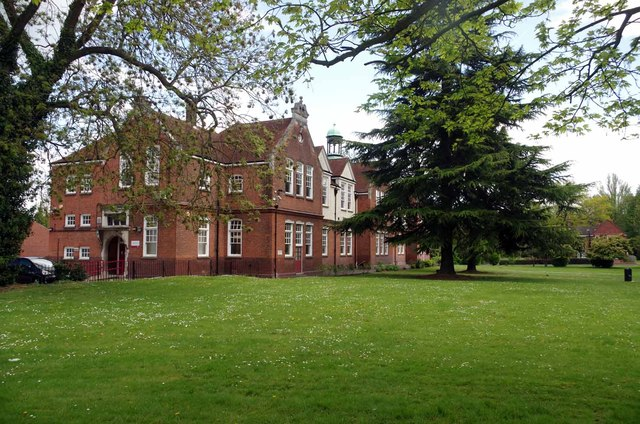
One of the surviving buildings from Hutton Poplars, now an adult education centre

Hutton Poplars was built in 1906 as a training school or residential home for destitute children from the Metropolitan Borough of Poplar in east London. It was capable of housing anything from 400-700 children at any one time. Like much of London during the Victorian era, Poplar faced high poverty levels. As the 19th century drew to a close the workhouses and orphanages in the borough were trying to cope with significant overcrowding. The chairman of the Board of Guardians for the region, George Lansbury, saw an opportunity to expand their operations into the Essex countryside, and convinced the Board to acquire 100 acres (0.40 km^{2}) of land situated between Hutton and Shenfield on the Rayleigh Road. In 1906 the Board completed work on a self-contained community with its own stores, school, indoor swimming pool and an array of ancillary buildings alongside the accommodation for the staff and a significant number of orphans living in small groups.

The cost of the project caused uproar in the Houses of Parliament when it first opened. Some MPs complained that with their parquet flooring and central heating the buildings were more of the comfort levels of a public school like Eton than an orphans' training school. However once operational the project received recognition for its good work, with a Governmental inspection in early 1914 rating the facilities as "among the best in Britain" with the children "well cared for by an efficient staff of specially selected teachers." A Royal visit followed in 1918. The school hosted the Duke of York's Royal Military School during the Great War, which had vacated its own site at Guston, Kent near Dover allowing it to be used as a transit camp for the British Army.

The placement of such an establishment was controversial with the local residents. The hostility dragged out some time, with the children referred to as "outsiders" and thought best avoided by the local residents. Towards the end of the 20th century this attitude is regarded as having mellowed.

The administration of Hutton Poplars passed to the London County Council in the 1920s, with the home subsequently opening its doors to children from all parts of East and North London.

Several thousand children passed through its gates over the next six decades. Inevitably the cost of running such an establishment came under scrutiny and an eventual policy shift saw the responsibility for child care passing to the individual borough councils, with smaller care homes springing up to replace these Victorian monoliths.

The creation of the Greater London Council in 1966 replacing the London County Council resulted in the London Borough of Hackney taking administrative control of the residential home. Charged with emptying it of non Hackney residents and ultimately selling it off to property developers, children began leaving for smaller establishments in and around London. Hackney continued to house its children there until 1982.

Hutton Poplar remained open until 1982. The buildings then witnessed various fates under Essex County Council. The swimming pool was demolished despite local residents' pleas for it to become a facility for the wider community. The school hall, known as Bishops Hill, has been maintained as an Adult Community Learning centre for the Mid Essex Adult Community College. Hutton Poplar Hall was restored in 1991 and may now be hired from Brentwood Borough Council.

The new housing development on the old site was modelled largely on the original layout, with houses forming an oval around central open spaces. The Essex Dining Hall remains as a traditional village hall.

Whit Monday was traditionally a reunion day when former residents were encouraged to visit for the annual open fete day. A reunion still takes place in the Essex dining hall on the Spring Bank Holiday Monday every year. Centenary celebrations took place in 2006. Former residents or anyone with connections to Hutton Poplars are most welcome at the annual event.

== Hutton Country Park ==
Hutton Country Park is a local nature reserve based on former farmland. The park is owned by Brentwood Borough Council having been acquired from Tarmac in 1997 to protect it from development. The park is in two sectors divided by the railway, the northern boundary is formed by the River Wid, the western boundary by Wash Road, the southern boundary by housing development off the Rayleigh Road and the eastern boundary remains contiguous with farmland. Access to the park is from Wash Road.

== Church ==
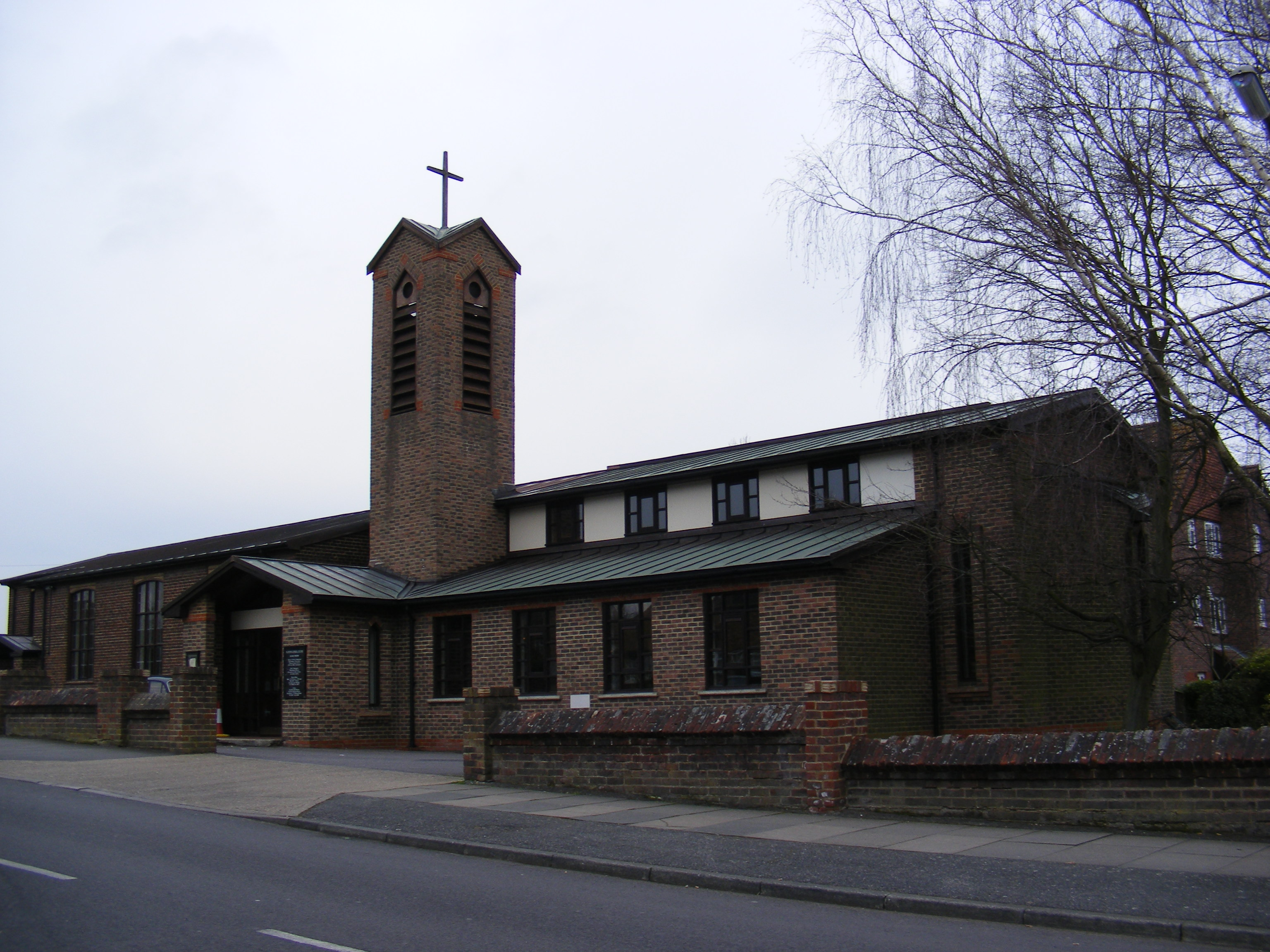
St Peter's Church

Hutton All Saints' Church is a small Grade II* listed ancient structure, with a wooden steeple, containing five bells. It has a more modern subsidiary church, dedicated to St Peter, built in the 1950s as a dual-purpose church and hall – a daughter church of All Saints', to serve the newly-developing housing estates to the west of the old village which now form the main part of Hutton. In 1990, it was possible to extend the building to provide separate worship and community areas. In 2001, generous grant funding enabled a complete refurbishment of the whole building to improve the facilities available to church and community organisations.

== Schools ==
Hutton has four primary schools: St Joseph the Worker (Roman Catholic), All Saints (C of E), Long Ridings County Primary and Willowbrook (previously known as Hutton County Primary School, and before that as Brookfield Infants and Junior) The original Village School on Church Lane closed and became a nursing home in the 1970s.

The town also has one preparatory school: Woodlands School Hutton Manor.

The area also contains a secondary school and sixth form college, St Martin's School, originally built as a segregated Secondary Modern, then run as a co-educational comprehensive and now an Academy 1.
