= River Wid =

River in Essex, England

Coordinates: 51°44′13″N 0°26′31″E

River Wid is a river in the county of Essex, England, a tributary of the River Can. It runs to the south of Chelmsford, following the A1016, previously the A12 out of Chelmsford at Widford.
