= Central Park, Chelmsford =

Park in Chelmsford, Essex, England

Central Park
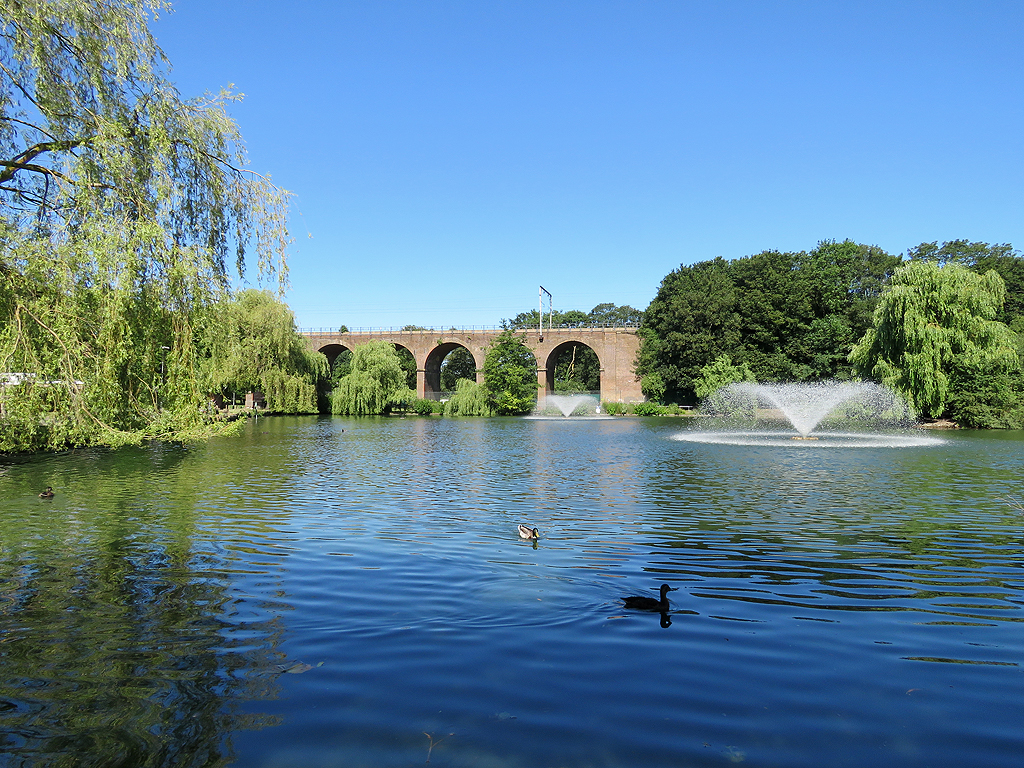
- The viaduct and fountains at Central Park
- Interactive map of Central Park
- Location: Chelmsford, Essex, England
- Coordinates: 51.7326°N 0.4628°E
- Open: All year

Central Park is a park in Chelmsford, Essex, England.

== History ==
The park was originally called the Recreation Ground. In 1842 the Eastern Counties Railway arrived in Chelmsford and an 18 arch railway viaduct was built through the ground. In 1917 the council ran its services through a series of committees, each November the mayor was changed and planted an oak tree in the recreation ground, the trees now mature, form an avenue. During World War II the park was the location of a gun emplacement which fired a gun battery of 64 twin rockets.

== Location ==
The park is in central Chelmsford and formally incorporates two other green spaces - Bell Meadow and Sky Blue Pasture. Admirals Park and Tower Gardens while formally separate are a short walk away and contain further facilities and an additional children's play area. West Park is formally separate but adjacent and contains a pitch and putt golf course. Noticeable features of the park are the lake, the railway viaduct and the River Can. On the other side of the river there is Essex County Cricket Club.

== Facilities ==
There are riverside walks, children's play zones, a cafe, flower beds, picnicking, seating, memorial gardens, a sports area and Marconi Ponds local nature reserve. Chelmsford Central Parkrun takes place every Saturday morning, the course starts in Central Park, follows the River Can to Admiral Park and then returns.
