= Bryan Butchard =

John Bryan Butchard (25 March 1919 – 8 October 2023) was a Royal Navy officer known for his valor during World War II.

== Biography ==
Born in Chelmsford, Essex, he was the son of a businessman who later became the president of an American ball-bearings company. Butchard entered Dartmouth Royal Naval College at the age of 13.

During World War II, as a sub-lieutenant aboard HMS Volunteer, Butchard participated in operations in France and Norway in 1940. Notably, while docked in Liverpool, he heroically rescued a crew member who fell overboard while intoxicated.

In early 1941, he served as first lieutenant on the V-class destroyer HMS Vimy. On September 3, 1942, Vimy engaged the German U-boat U-162, which had been responsible for sinking 14 Allied vessels. The engagement led to the U-boat's destruction, earning Butchard mentions in dispatches for his "gallantry and enterprise."

Further exploits included the rescue of survivors from the US merchantman West Lashaway in September 1941 and a confrontation with a wolf pack of U-boats while escorting convoy SC 118 in February 1943, resulting in heavy enemy losses but also Allied casualties.

Post-war, Butchard served as a torpedo officer aboard HMS Diadem and accompanied the royal family to South Africa in 1947 aboard HMS Vanguard. He retired from active service in 1949 due to partial deafness caused by prolonged exposure to gunfire.

Later, Butchard joined the Naval Ordnance Inspectorate and was promoted to captain in 1974. He took retirement in 1989.

== Personal life ==
Butchard settled in Wylye, Wiltshire, with his wife, Patricia, who was widowed from his friend Nigel Thurston killed during the Dunkirk evacuation. The couple had a son and a stepdaughter.
