= Chelmsford Civic Centre =

Municipal building in Chelmsford, Essex, England

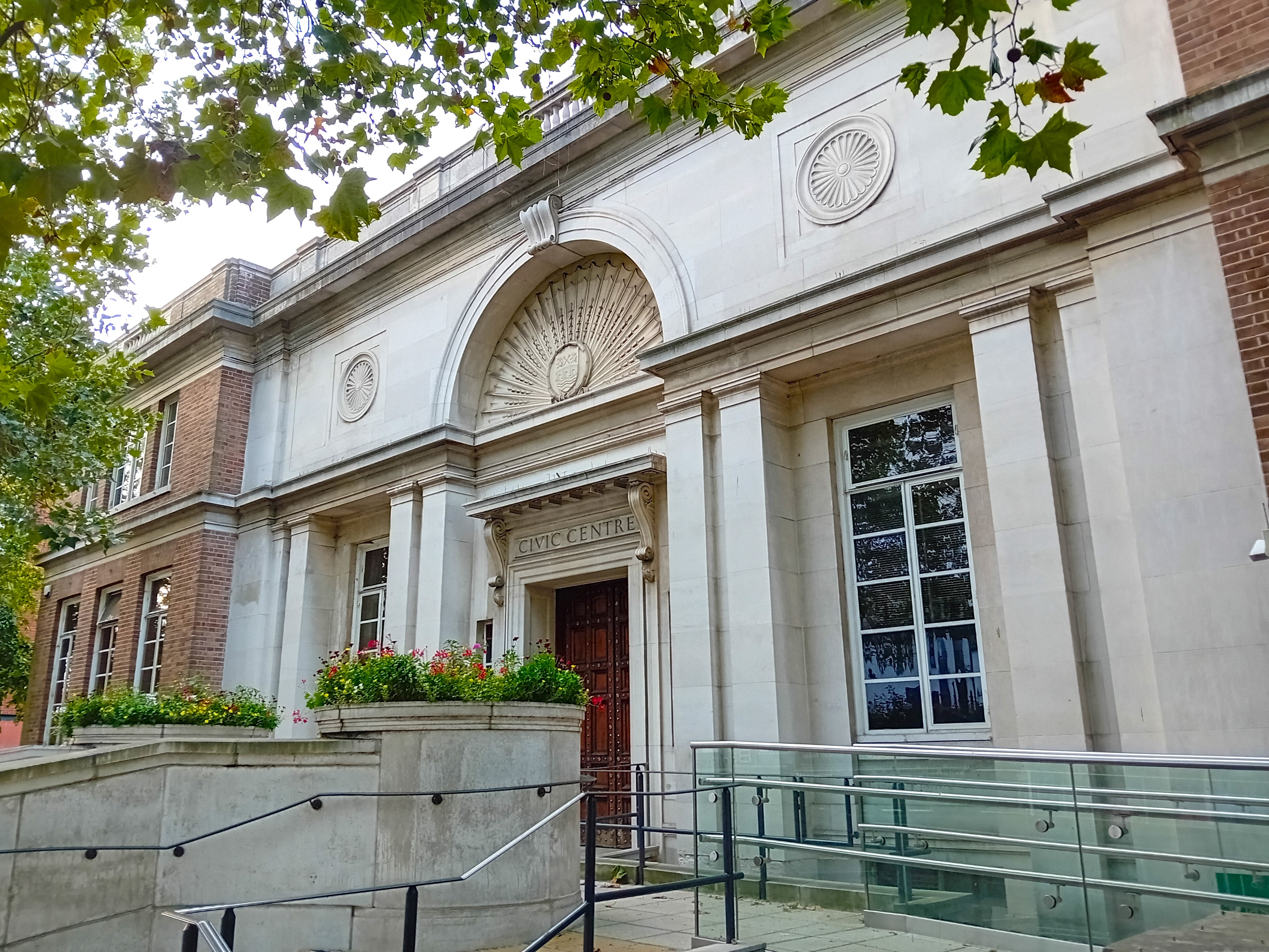
- Chelmsford Civic Centre

- Shown in Essex
- 51.7367°N 0.4660°E
- Location: Duke Street, Chelmsford

History
- Built: 1935

Site notes
- Architect(s): Cordingley & McIntyre
- Architectural style: Neo-Georgian style

Chelmsford Civic Centre is a municipal building in Duke Street, Chelmsford, Essex, England. The structure, which accommodates the offices and meeting place of Chelmsford City Council, is a locally listed building.

== History ==
Following significant population growth, largely associated with the status of Chelmsford as a market town, a local board of health was formed for the town in 1850. The area was then incorporated a municipal borough in 1888. In the early years of its existence, the borough council held its meetings in the Shire Hall. After finding this arrangement unsatisfactory, civic leaders identified the need for a dedicated building. The site they selected was open land to the east of a building known as Rainsford House, the home of the Molson family.

Following a poor response to their fund-raising campaign, civic leaders decided to focus on commissioning a war memorial, to commemorate the lives of local service personnel who had been killed in the First World War. It was designed by the borough engineer, Ernest John Miles, sculpted in Portland stone and took the form of a cenotaph on a pedestal. It was unveiled by Vice-Admiral Sir Roger Keyes on 11 November 1923.

In the early 1930s, civic leaders proceeded to commission the first part of the main complex, the eastern block of the current structure, which was intended to serve as a public library. The new building was designed by Cordingley & McIntyre in the Neo-Georgian style, built in brown brick and Portland stone at a cost of £27,000, and was officially opened on 10 April 1935. The design involved a symmetrical main frontage of nine bays facing onto Duke Street. The central section of three bays, which was slightly recessed and faced in Portland stone, featured a flight of steps leading up to a square headed doorway flanked by brackets supporting a modillioned cornice. The outer bays of the central section were fenestrated by tall casement windows flanked by pairs of Tuscan order columns supporting a cornice, a large entablature containing a semi-circular feature above the doorway, and a parapet. The outer sections, which were faced in brown brick, were fenestrated by casement windows in each of the three bays on the ground floor and by tri-partite windows on the first floor.

A major extension to the west and to the south, accommodating council offices, a council chamber and committee rooms, as well as an assembly hall with capacity to seat 580 people, was built at a cost of £300,000 and was officially opened on 25 May 1962. The assembly hall was later renamed the Chelmsford Theatre.

The civic centre continued to serve as the headquarters of the borough council for much of the 20th century and remained the local seat of government after the council area was enlarged to include the former surrounding rural district in 1974. A bunker intended to protect councillors in the event of a nuclear attack was completed in 1985. The borough achieved city status as part of the celebrations for the Diamond Jubilee of Elizabeth II in 2012.

Works of art in the town hall include a bust, sculpted by George Henry Paulin, of the electrical engineer, Colonel R. E. B. Crompton, who established the Crompton Parkinson factory in Chelmsford in 1885. There is also a bust, sculpted by Clare Sheridan, of the electrical engineer, Guglielmo Marconi, who established the New Street Works in Chelmsford in 1912.
