= Widford, Essex =

Area of Chelmsford, England

Coordinates: 51.713°N 0.447°E

Widford
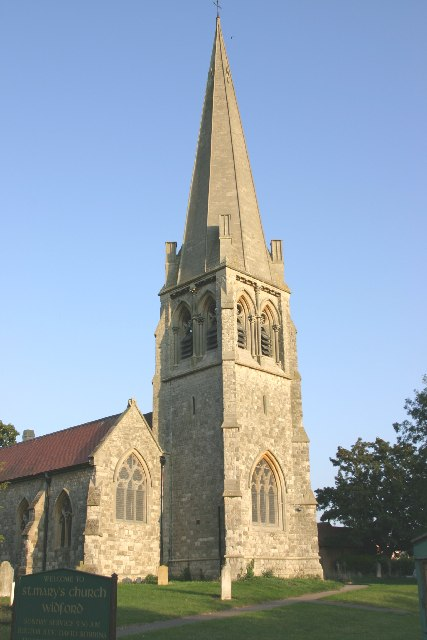
- St. Mary's Church, Widford

- Location within Essex
- District: Chelmsford
- Shire county: Essex
- Region: East
- Country: England
- Sovereign state: United Kingdom
- Post town: CHELMSFORD
- Postcode district: CM2
- Dialling code: 01279
- Police: Essex
- Fire: Essex
- Ambulance: East of England

Widford is an area of Chelmsford in Essex, England. It was formerly a separate village but now forms part of the Chelmsford built up area, lying 1.5 miles (2 km) south-west of the city centre. In includes mixed residential, industrial and rural areas lying generally south of the River Can, east of the River Wid and mostly to the west of the Great Eastern Main Line. It has been administered as part of Chelmsford since 1934.

== Toponymy ==
Widford is first recorded in 1216 (as Witford); the later 13th century forms Wydiford and Wydeford show that derivation from "withig" (by the willows) and ford (crossing) is probable. The name of the River Wid is a later back formation.

== History ==
In early times the area was inhabited by the Iceni and later by the East Saxons. In 1329, the manor of Widford was held by Edward of Woodstock, Earl of Kent; and it afterwards passed to the Mortimer, Bacon, Altham, and other families.

Widford was an ancient parish in the Chelmsford hundred of Essex. In 1934 the parish was abolished. Most of the area, including the built up parts of the old village and areas where the suburbs of Chelmsford were growing into the parish, was absorbed into the municipal borough of Chelmsford. Some western parts of the parish, notably the parts in Hylands Park, went instead to the neighbouring parish of Writtle. At the 1931 census (the last before the abolition of the civil parish), Widford had a population of 457.

=== Account of Widford in 1848 ===
White’s Directory of Essex, published in 1848, describes Widford as 'a small parish on the London road' (the old Roman road which has become the A414, Widford Road & Moulsham Street). It contained 692 acres (280 ha) of land, and about 190 inhabitants. When the census was taken in July 1841, its population had been swelled by railway labourers to 362. Widford village had about 300 occupants, but appeared to have been split so that some of it was in Chelmsford parish.

John Attwood MP owned most of the land and lord of the manor. The description from 1848 goes on to say that he 'has a handsome seat here, called Hylands on the western acclivity of the valley, commanding extensive views. Though the house was large and handsome, he is now erecting a more elegant and spacious mansion. The park and pleasure grounds are extensive and beautiful. The old house was erected by Chief Justice John Comyns, Kt, in about 1730, and was much improved by the late P. C. Labouchere, Esq. Mr. Attwood is one of the parliamentary representatives of Harwich.'

The description of the village goes on 'the Church (St. Mary) is a small neat structure of mixed architecture, but evidently of Saxon origin. The wooden turret, at the west end, has two bells, and is crowned by a small spire. There is a chapel belonging to the lord of the manor, and near it is a monument in memory of Viscountess Falkland. The rectory, valued in K.B. at £8, and in 1831, at £225, is in the patronage of J Attwood and incumbency of the Rev William Buswell BA, who has a good residence, which he has lately much improved. The tithes were commuted in 1838, for £257 per annum. Mr. Attwood built a Schoolhouse in the church yard in 1843. In 1776, Lady Falkland left £200 to this parish, to provide for a weekly contribution of bread among the pool attending the church. To increase this charity, the Rev John Saunders left £100 in 1814. These bequests now form a fund of £379.4s.9d. three per cent Consols, and the dividends are applied in a weekly distribution of 17 threepenny loaves. In 1738, Benjamin Sarjant left £100 three per cent. Reduced Annuities, in trust, to apply the dividends yearly in clothing, for two poor widows, and two poor widowers.'

=== Notable buildings ===
The 1881 map of the area appears to show five buildings of significance: Hylands House, Widford Hall, Widford Lodge, St Mary's church and the workhouse.

- Hylands Park and House is now in the ownership of Chelmsford City Council and its history is well documented. The house was historically in the parish of Widford, and the park straddled the boundary between Widford and Writtle. The house and adjoining parts of the park were transferred to Writtle parish as part of the 1934 boundary changes which abolished Widford parish.
- Widford Hall still exists. When it was sold in 1949 it was recorded as a 'freehold corn and dairy farm comprising Georgian residence known as Widford Hall, with gardens, grounds, tennis court, summerhouse, with agricultural buildings including cow house, Dutch barn, 6 cottages and 259 acres of arable and pasture land; and an enclosure of freehold land used as allotments in total about 1.75 acres. It has been converted to offices and is surrounded by Widford Industrial Estate.
- Widford Lodge remains too. On its sale in 1933 it was described as 'a freehold estate comprising residence which includes billiard room, 6 principal bedrooms, 3 garages, outbuildings including stables, kennels, greenhouses, two tennis courts, gardens and park lands, gardener's or chauffeur's cottages, in total 18 acres with extensive frontages to the main Chelmsford to London road, and to Wood Street'. It became an independent preparatory school in 1935 following its resale when it had been trimmed to consist of a 'freehold estate comprising detached residence with gardens, lawns, lily pool, and outbuildings, with grounds of about 1 acre' in 1934.
- Parish church: It was designed by James Piers St Aubyn and built in 1862.
- The former workhouse became a hospital and has since been sold for development as a residential area. Its history is also well documented.
- Silent Woman Inn: reputed to be the only Silent Woman in Essex. This was a public house on the old main road opposite the White Horse. The original pub sign showing a picture of a woman with her head cut off is now in the Chelmsford and Essex Museum in Oaklands Park.
- The Sir Evelyn Wood public house, has another unique pub sign and pays tribute to the Essex celebrity of that name who was born at Cressing vicarage in 1838 and became a great military hero in Victorian times. Large crowds gathered at the Shire Hall, Chelmsford, when he was presented with a Sword of Honour on 14 October 1879, and again in 1903 when he received the Freedom of the Borough in recognition of his promotion to Field Marshal. He died at Harlow in 1919 at the age of 71 years.
