= Tom Bury =

English first-class cricketer (born 1958)

Personal information
- Full name: Thomas Edmund Oswell Bury
- Born: 14 May 1958 (age 68); Chelmsford, Essex, England
- Batting: Right-handed
- Role: Wicket-keeper

Domestic team information
- Years: Team
- 1979–1980: Oxford University

Career statistics
Competition	First-class
Matches	4
Runs scored	32
Batting average	10.66
100s/50s	–/–
Top score	22
Catches/stumpings	2/–
- Source: Cricinfo, 5 January 2020

Thomas 'Tom' Edmund Oswell Bury (born 14 May 1958) is a former English first-class cricketer.

Born at Chelmsford in May 1958, Bury was educated at Charterhouse School, before going up to St Edmund Hall, Oxford. While studying at Oxford, Botton played first-class cricket for Oxford University in 1979 and 1980, making four appearances. He scored 32 runs in his four matches, with a highest score of 22. After graduating from Oxford, Bury entered into business.
