= Marconi Research Centre =

Coordinates: 51.7076°N 0.5029°E

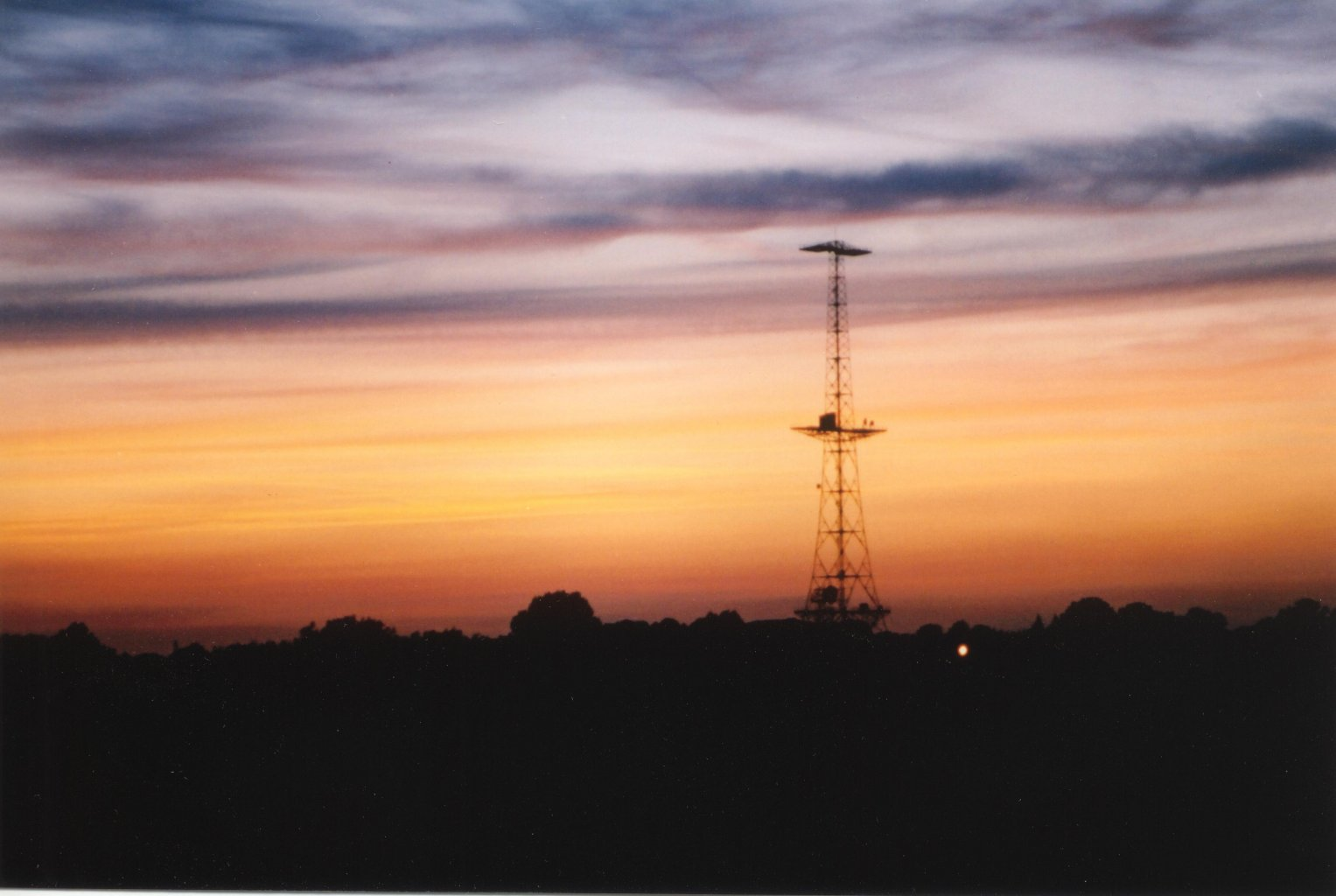
Marconi Research Centre

Marconi Research Centre is the former name of the current BAE Systems Applied Intelligence Laboratories facility at Great Baddow in Essex, United Kingdom. Under its earlier name, research at this site spanned military and civilian technology covering the full range of products offered by GEC-Marconi, including radio, radar, telecommunications, mechatronics and microelectronics.

== Origins ==
Marconi Company chose to establish itself in Chelmsford shortly after the company was founded in 1897. It first acquired the former silk-works on Hall Street before expanding to a new factory, the New Street Works, in 1912. At the same time a formal Research Department was founded under the auspices of Charles Samuel Franklin near the original Hall Street works.

The facilities were placed under the direction of the Admiralty at the outbreak of the First World War. When the Marconi Company resumed control in 1919, it was two years before the Research Department was reconstituted under H. J. Round, who had previously worked for Franklin, with a separate research team now formed under Franklin himself. Thomas Eckersley started working for Marconi at this time.

By 1924 the Marconi Company had developed short wave radio technology sufficiently to be awarded a contract from the Post Office to run elements of the Imperial Wireless Chain. Further research groups were developed, including one working on television. In 1936 it was decided to bring together the various radio, television and telephony research teams in a single location. A site was bought in Great Baddow because it was deemed sufficiently far from potential sources of electrical interference for all research work to be carried out without problems. Building work began in 1937 and by 1938 researchers started working at the site.

== Pre-war activity ==
The new facilities were placed under the direction of J. G. Robb. Research under his direction was varied, including a telephone laboratory focusing on audio research, propagation, low noise receivers, radio direction finding and television. A specialist component group developed quartz crystals and gas discharge devices.

== Second World War and its aftermath ==
In April 1940 the Royal Air Force took charge of the team around Eckersley dealing with Radio propagation. By August 1941, with the Admiralty Signal Establishment set up, the rest of the laboratories were taken over by the Admiralty.

When the UK electronics industry developed during the 1940s and 1950s, the campus expanded to include research into radar, general physics, high voltage, vacuum physics and semiconductors. At its peak the Centre employed more than 1,200 engineers, technicians, craftsmen and support staff. It was also home to the Marconi Company's museum containing numerous original artifacts from the pioneering period of Guglielmo Marconi's work on wireless telegraphy.

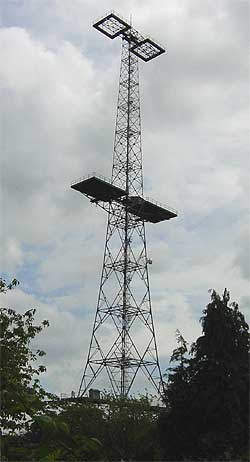
The Great Baddow tower. A WWII, Grade II listed Chain Home tower.

The site still includes a prominent local landmark, a 360-foot (110 m) high former Chain Home radar tower visible across the surrounding countryside. The last remaining tower maintaining all of its platforms, the tower was given a Grade II listed status by Historic England in October 2019.

== Notable Marconi Research employees and scientists ==
- Sir Christopher Cockerell
- Sir Eric Eastwood, FRS
- Thomas Eckersley, FRS
- Frank Farmer
- Bernard de Neumann
- Peter Wright, author of Spycatcher
- Tony Sale, reconstructor of the Colossus computer
