= Chelmsford College =

Further education college in Essex, England

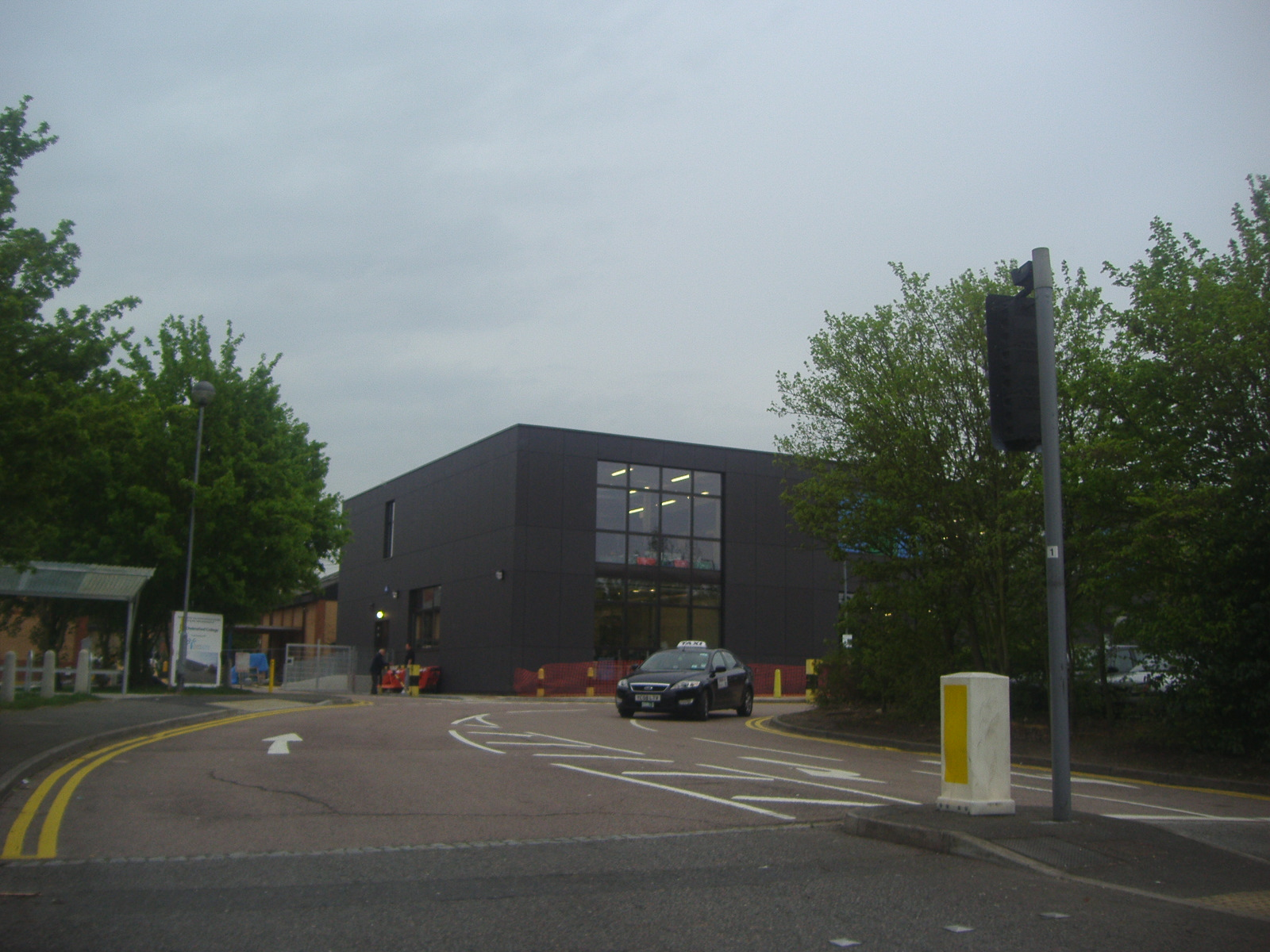

Location
- Moulsham Street; Chelmsford, Essex, CM2 0JQ; England
- Coordinates: 51.72483°N 0.46651°E

Information
- Type: Further education college
- Established: 1962
- Local authority: Essex
- Department for Education URN: 130679 Tables
- Gender: Coeducational
- Age: 16+
- Enrolment: 3,500 (2015)
- Website: www.chelmsford-college.ac.uk

Chelmsford College is a further education college based in Chelmsford, Essex, England, established in 1962. It has two main campuses, one original site at Moulsham Street and a second in Princes Road. It is a medium-sized college offering 16–19 study programmes, apprenticeships and courses for adults.

== History ==
The school was founded as Chelmsford College of Further Education in 1962 at its Dovedale Site. In 1968, the school added its first purpose-built accommodations. Both the Dovedale Nursery opened and the school added the Science Department of Mid-Essex Technical College in 1973. The school celebrated its 25th anniversary in 1987. The following year, the school began construction of its new Princes Road campus. The Chelmer Institute Departments of Catering & Home Economics and Building also joined the school in 1988. In 1989, the new campus was opened, with Diana, Princess of Wales attending the ceremony.

In 1993 the school was renamed Chelmsford College and in 2002 the school opened its a facility at Copleston Court. In 2009, the Chelmsford College Group (CGC) was formed and the school acquired the Chelmsford Training Services, a training company. The CGC opened a commercial hair and beauty salon, Zest, in 2010. The Dovedale Nursery was also redeveloped in 2010 and made a Community Interest Company, before moving into its own facility in 2011. That same year, the Football Academy was established and, in partnership with Lee Stafford, the Lee Stafford Academy was opened in 2012. In 2023, the Centre for Built Environment and Sustainable Technologies and Institute of Technology Centre was opened by the school.
