= New Street Works =

Coordinates: 51°44′17.72″N 0°28′25.9″E

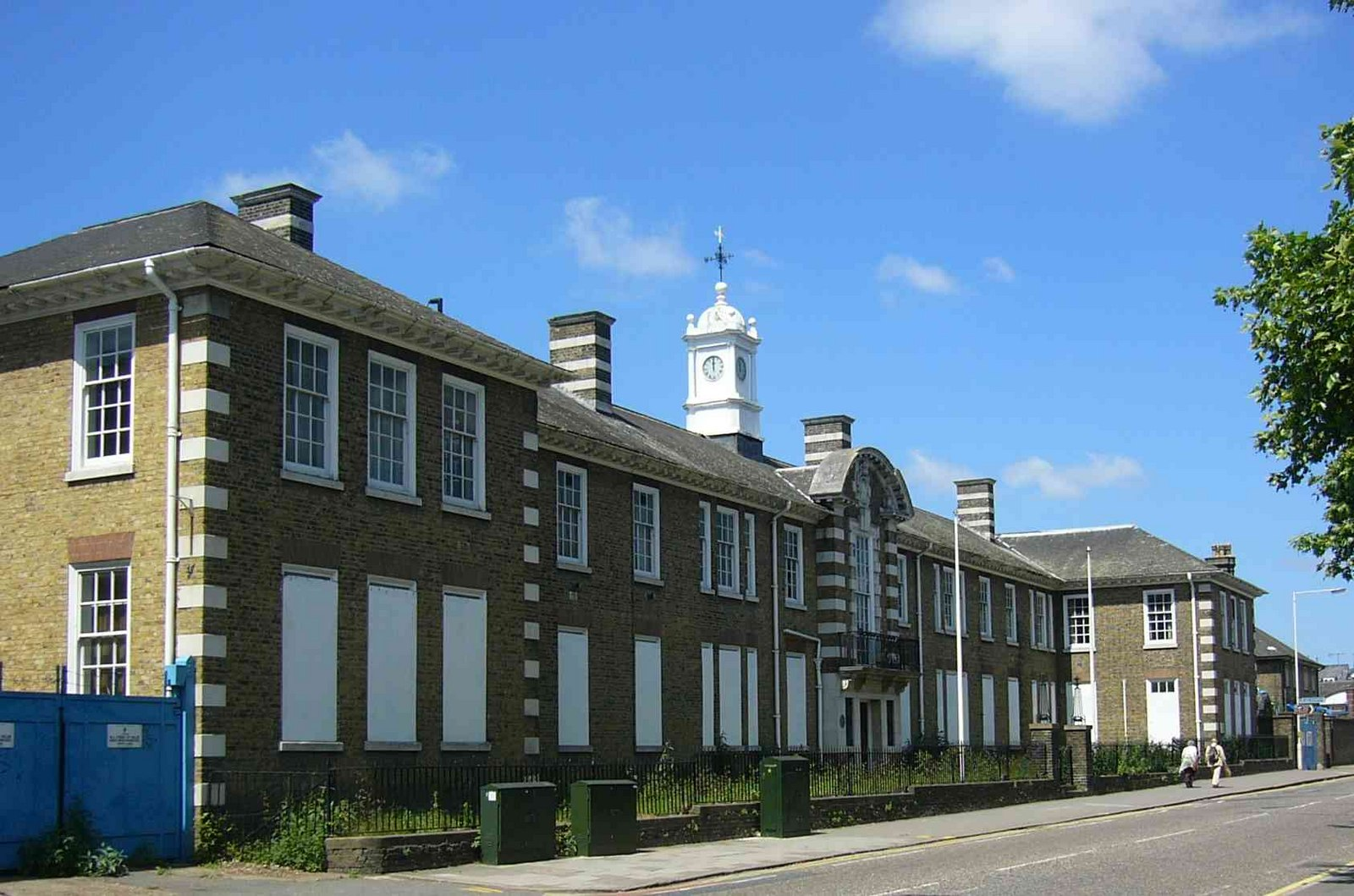
- The factory building in 2011
- Interactive map of the New Street Works area

General information
- Status: Unoccupied, Grade II listed
- Type: Manufacturing plant
- Architectural style: Edwardian/Art Deco
- Location: New Street, Chelmsford, England
- Groundbreaking: 26 February 1912
- Inaugurated: 22 June 1912
- Client: Guglielmo Marconi/Marconi Company
- Landlord: Ashwell Property Group (In receivership)

Technical details
- Floor area: 70,000-square-foot (6,500 m^{2}) (As built)

Design and construction
- Architecture firm: W.Dunn and R.Watson

Website
- New Street Works @ Industrious Southeast

The New Street Works was a manufacturing plant built for the Marconi Company in Chelmsford, England in 1912. It is credited as being the first purpose-built radio factory in the world.

== History ==
Guglielmo Marconi had established his company offices at the former silk-works on Hall Street, Chelmsford in 1898. It was the world's first wireless factory, making maritime SOS equipment that played a vital role in ensuring the rescue of survivors from both the Titanic and Lusitania liners. But 14 years later, these were deemed too small for the expanding concern.

Purchasing a plot of land on part of the old Essex County Cricket Club ground on New Street, Marconi commissioned architects W. Dunn and R. Watson to design a new purpose-built factory. From conception to completion, the project took only 17 weeks, with construction work commencing on 26 February 1912. Providing 70,000-square-foot (6,500 m^{2}) of production space equipped with the latest tools and laboratories, the changeover between Hall St. and New St. happened in just one weekend. The Works were opened and ready for inspection on 22 June 1912 by the delegates of the International Radiotelegraphic Conference, each of whom was issued with a commemorative booklet. The site is credited with being the world's first purpose-built radio factory, giving Chelmsford the claimed title "Home of the radio".

In 1919, two 450 feet (140 m) aerial masts were added to the site. In 1920, a number of licences were issued by the General Post Office in accordance with the Wireless Telegraphy Act 1904, for the purpose of conducting experimental transmissions. The first occurred from New Street Works on 15 June 1920, featuring Dame Nellie Melba singing two arias and her famous trill, with the signal received throughout Europe and as far away as Newfoundland, Canada. The event today is commemorated by a blue plaque.

In 1936–39, the art deco-styled factory and attached five-storey Marconi House were completed, the later housing the factories offices. The company also opened the Marconi Research Laboratory in 1936, to bring together their various radio, television and telephony research teams in a single location. At its peak, the factory employed 4,500, while the Research Centre employed an additional 1,200 engineers. The Research Centre was also home to the original Marconi museum, containing numerous original artefacts from the pioneering period of Guglielmo Marconi's work on wireless telegraphy.

Post World War II, the Marconi company was bought by English Electric. In 1949 building 720 was added, which boasted the largest unsupported roof span in the United Kingdom, and also housed the new canteen.

In 1999 the residual defence arm of Marconi was bought by British Aerospace to form BAE Systems, who still occupy the new building within the Marconi Research Centre to the west of the site. A residual part of the original company was sold-off in 2001 to Selex Communications, part of Italian-conglomerate Finmeccanica, who resultantly took over the New Street works the same year. In 2005, Selex announced its own move to a new factory in Basildon, completed in 2008, ending nearly 100 years of communications industry on the site.

== Present ==
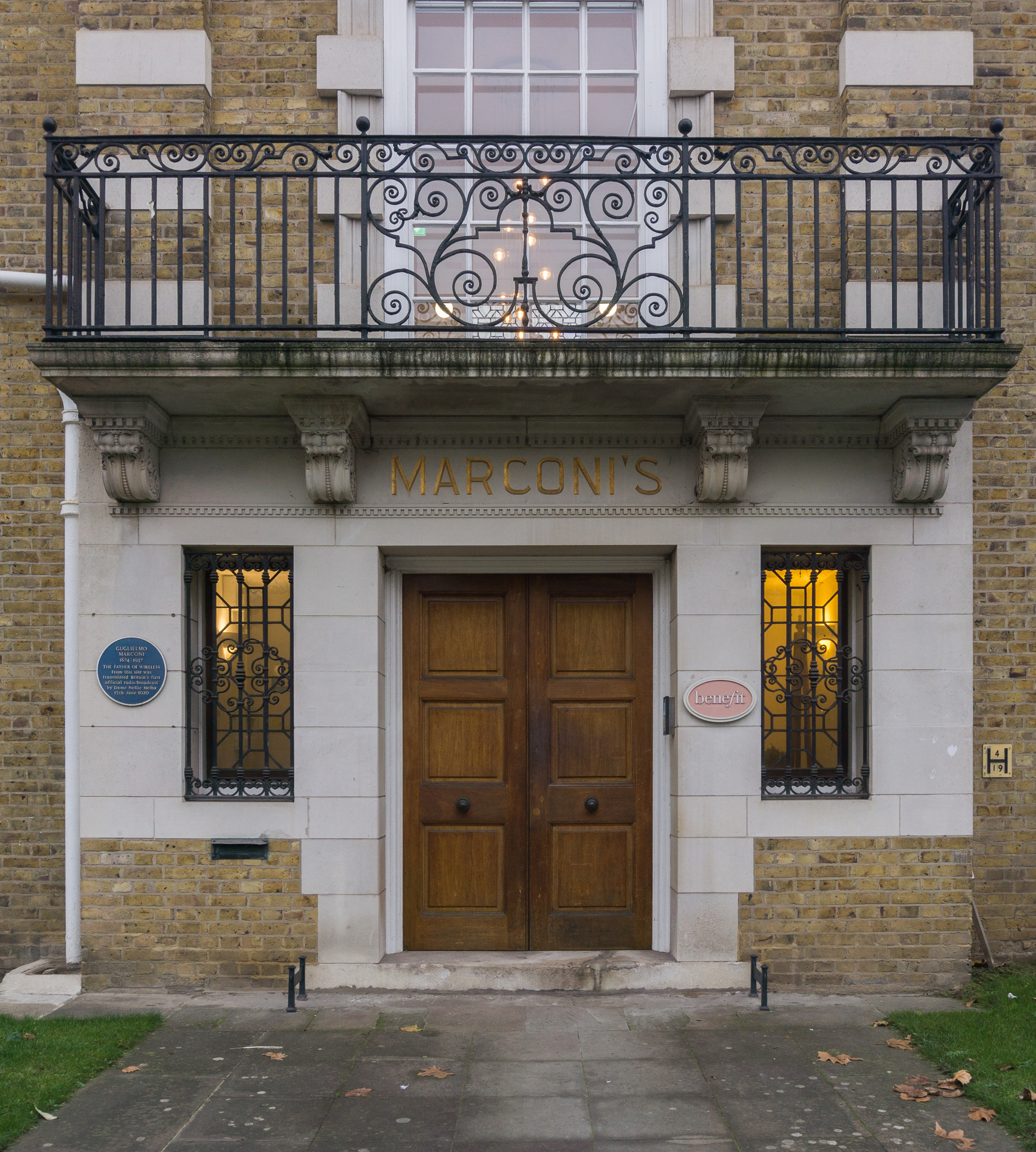
New Street Factory entrance with the blue plaque in 2018

Following de-occupation, Chelmsford Council successfully Grade2 listed four buildings on the site: 1912 New St building; New St Cottages; the powerhouse; the water tower. The art-deco factory, Marconi House and building 720 are not listed.

Bought by Ashwell Property Group, the company fell into administration in 2008/9, with redevelopment due to start in 2010. The site was finally sold for redevelopment to Bellway Homes in the summer of 2012 with demolition of the majority of the site including the iconic Marconi House and Building 720 in April/May 2013. Only the Grade II listed water tower, The 1912 front building façade, the New Street cottages and the power house will remain.

On 6 June 2008, Chelmsford Amateur Radio Society (CARS) set up an amateur radio station to commemorate the 96 years of production at the site, broadcasting under special callsign GB96MWT. On 23 June 2012, CARS set up another amateur radio station to commemorate 100 years of the site opening.

== Bibliography ==
- Tim Wander G6GUX (16 February 2012). Marconi's New Street Works 1912 – 2012. Authors Online. ISBN 978-0755206933.
