= HMS Volunteer =

HMS Volunteer or HMS Volontaire has been the name of more than one ship of the British Royal Navy, and may refer to:

- HMS Volunteer (1804), a gunvessel purchased in 1804 and sold in 1812
- HMS Volontaire (1806), a fifth rate captured in 1806 and scrapped in 1816
- HMS Volunteer (1916), a mooring vessel acquired in 1916, renamed HMS Volens in 1918, and in service until 1947
- HMS Volunteer (D71), later I71, a destroyer launched in 1919 and sold in 1947 for scrapping
