= Chelmsford =

City in Essex, England

Coordinates: 51.73°N 0.48°E

- City
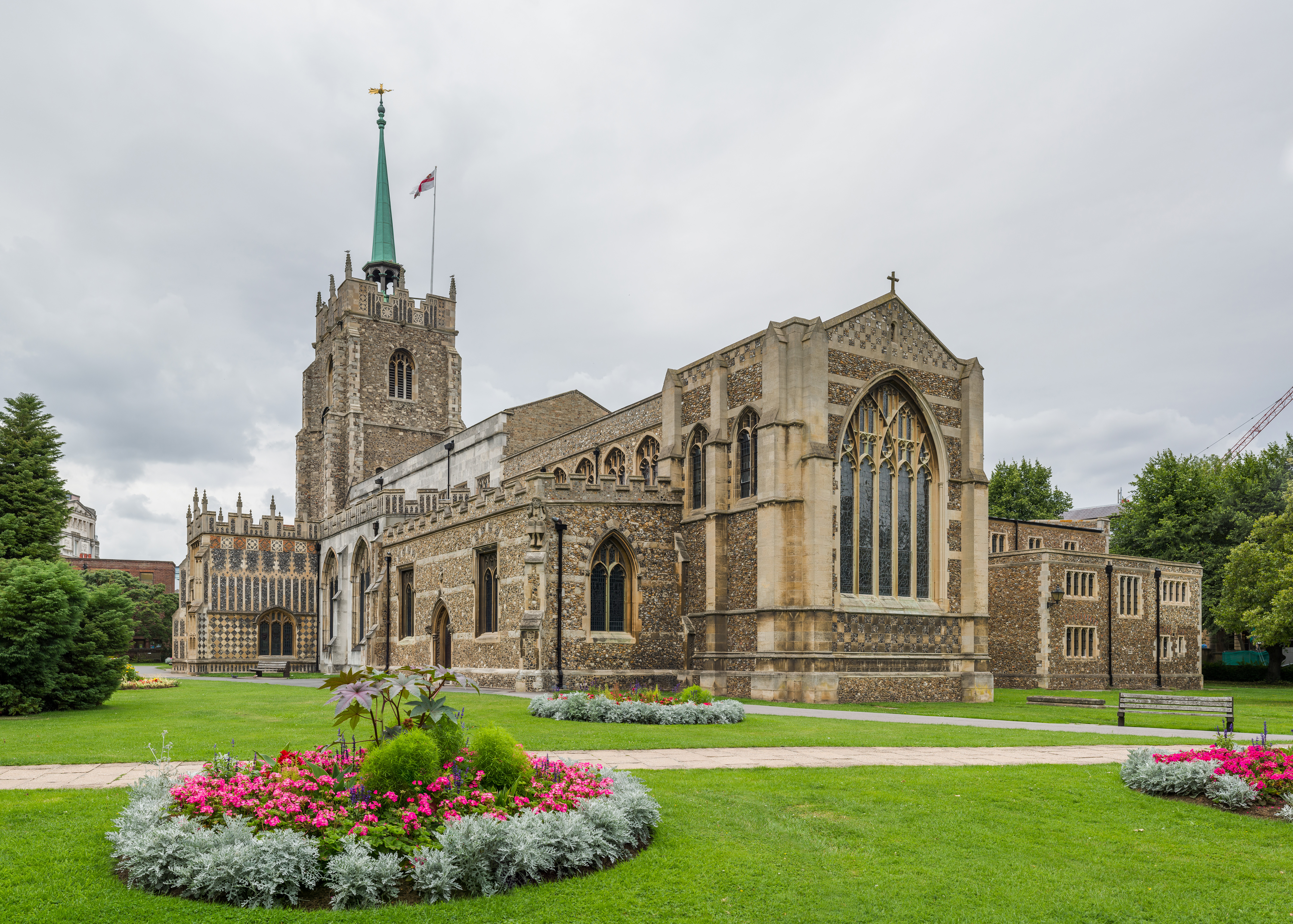
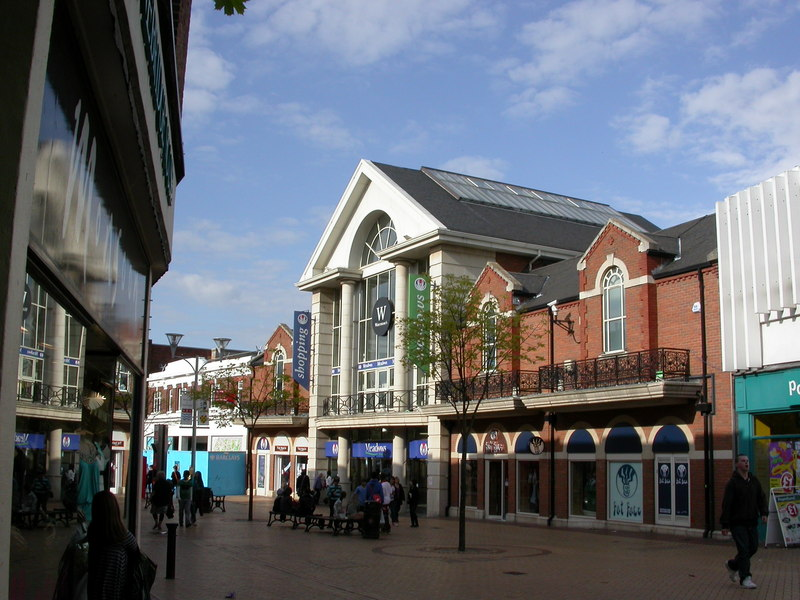
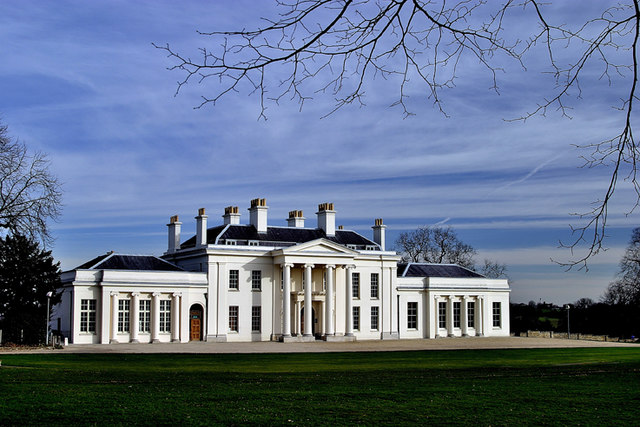
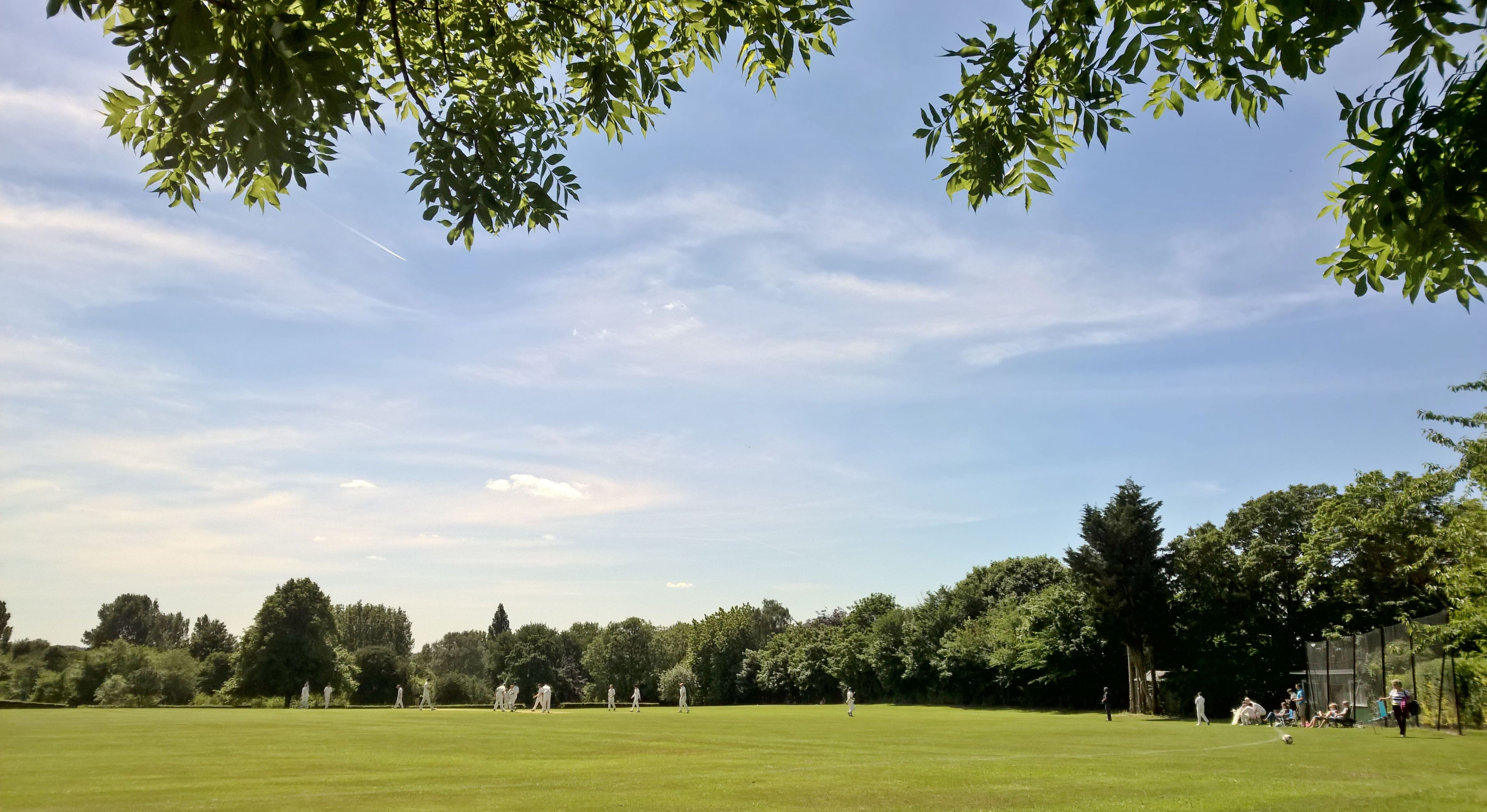
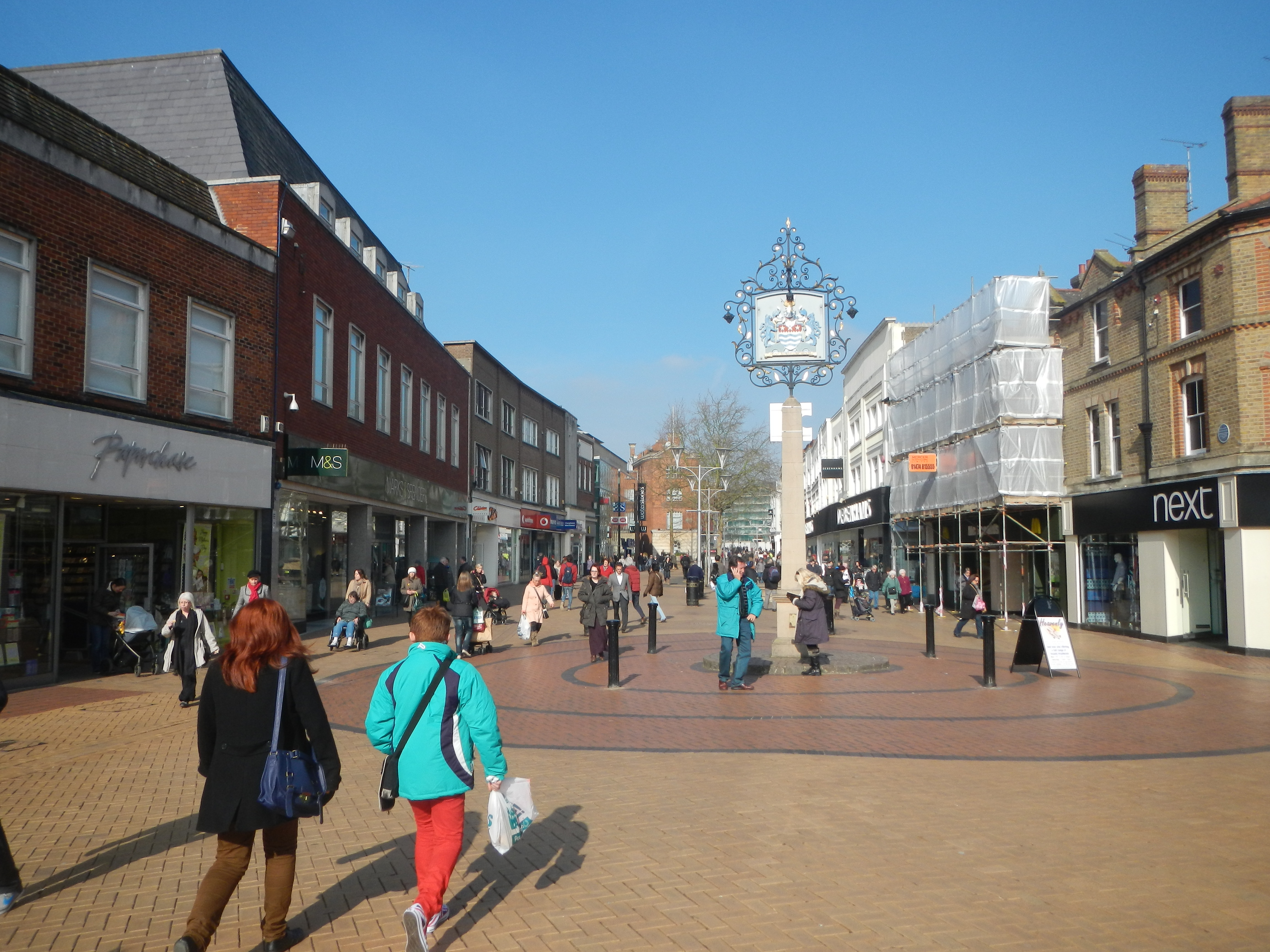
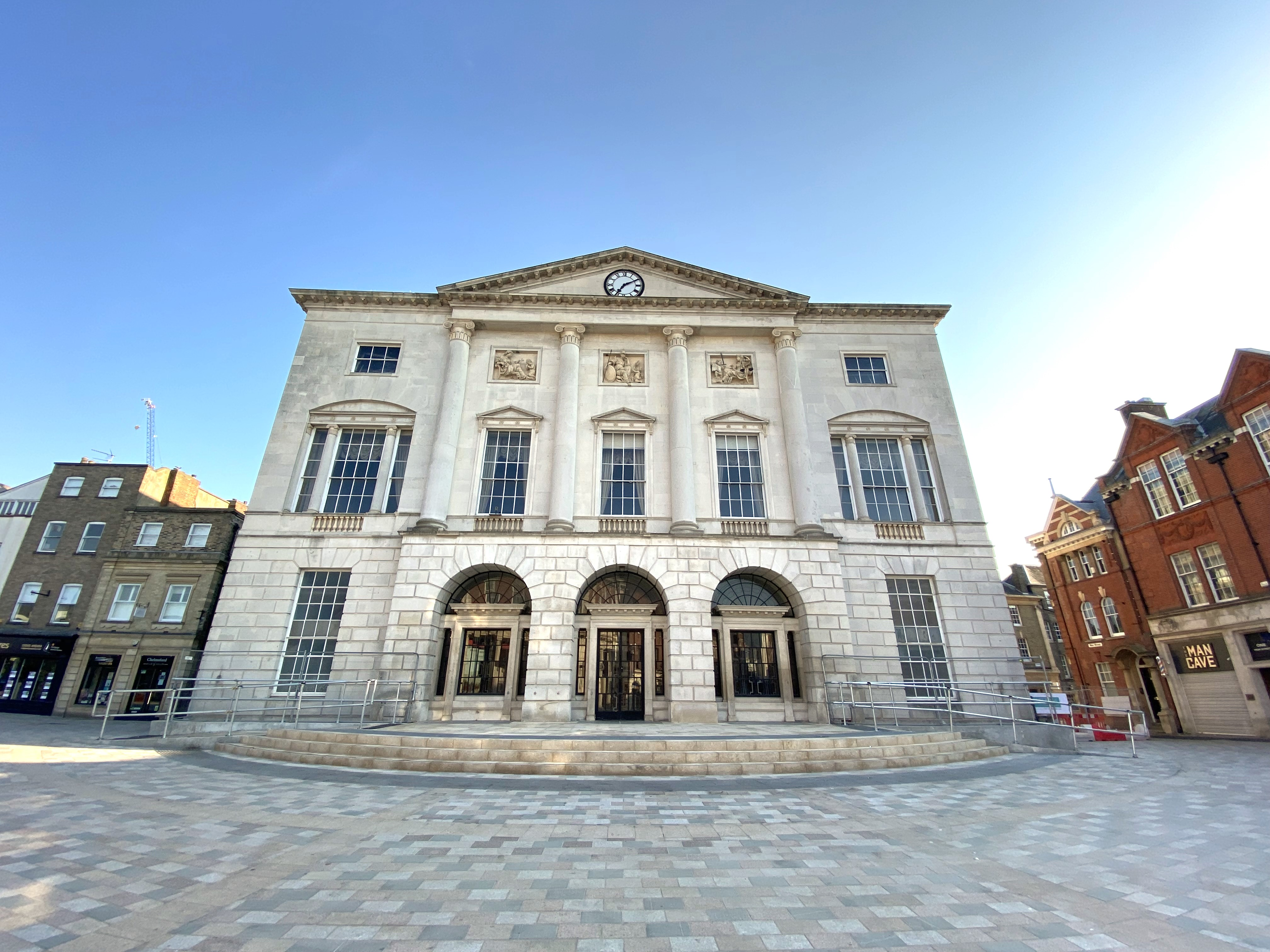
- Clockwise from top, left to right: Chelmsford Cathedral; Shopping Centre; Hylands House; Admiral's Park; City Centre and Shire Hall

- Location within Essex
- Population: 110,625 (Built up area, 2021)
- OS grid reference: TL7107
- District: City of Chelmsford
- Shire county: Essex
- Region: East
- Country: England
- Sovereign state: United Kingdom
- Post town: CHELMSFORD
- Postcode district: CM1, CM2, CM3
- Dialling code: 01245
- Police: Essex
- Fire: Essex
- Ambulance: East of England
- UK Parliament: Chelmsford

Chelmsford (/ˈtʃɛlmzfərd/) is a city in Essex, England. It is the county town of Essex and one of three cities in the county, along with Colchester and Southend-on-Sea. It is located 31 miles (50 km) north-east of Charing Cross in London, and 22 miles (35 km) south-west of Colchester. At the 2021 census the built up area had a population of 110,625. It gives its name to the wider Chelmsford local government district which also covers an extensive surrounding area.

Chelmsford as a settlement started growing after 1100 AD, when a bridge across the River Can was built. The town grew in importance after King John issued a Royal Charter in 1196, allowing Chelmsford to host a market, and by 1219 the town had become the county town of Essex. Chelmsford was involved in the Peasants' Revolt of 1381, and King Richard II moved on the town after quelling the revolt in London. In 1516, King Henry VIII purchased the Boleyn estate, building Beaulieu Palace, located on the current site of New Hall School.

During the early 20th century Chelmsford grew in industrial importance, becoming the birth place of radio under Guglielmo Marconi. Other big manufacturers were Crompton & Co under R. E. B. Crompton, Hoffmann Ball Bearings, Fell Christy (later known as Christy Norris Ltd), Coleman and Moreton, Thomas Clarkson and Eddington and Stevenson. In 1914, the parish church of St Mary the Virgin was raised to the status of a cathedral on the creation of the Diocese of Chelmsford, while in 2012 the town received Royal assent to become a city.

== History ==
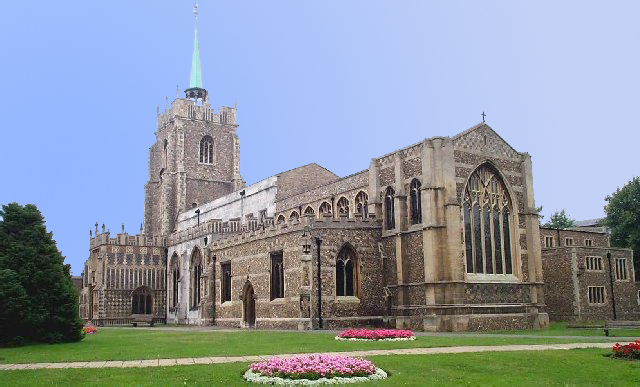
Chelmsford Cathedral

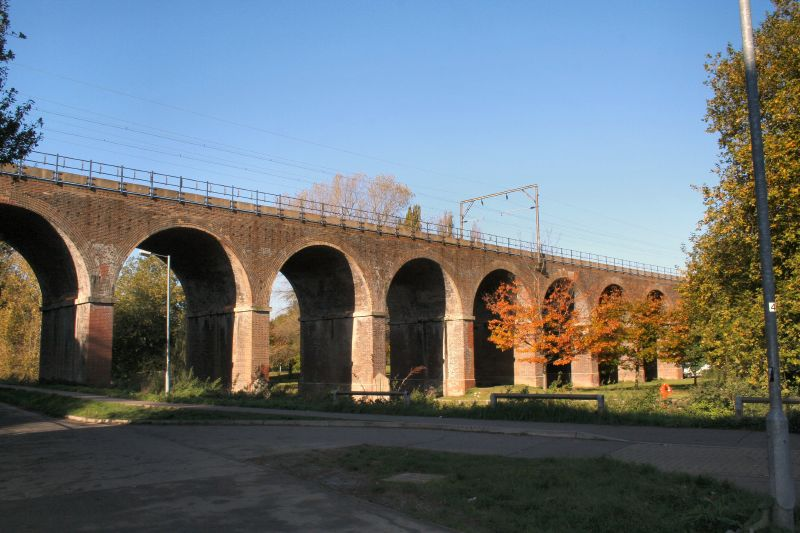
The 18-arch Victorian Railway Viaduct that carries the Great Eastern Main Line through Central Park

=== Early history ===
Before 1199, there were settlements nearby from ancient times. The remains of a Neolithic and a late Bronze Age settlement have been found in the suburb of Springfield, and the town was occupied by the Romans. A Roman fort was built in AD 60, and a civilian town grew up around it. The town was given the name of Caesaromagus (Caesar's field or Caesar's marketplace), although the reason for it being given the great honour of bearing the Imperial prefix is now unclear – possibly indicating that it was on this site that Roman Emperor, Claudius, defeated the remaining British armies during the Roman conquest of Britain, before capturing Camulodunum. The remains of a mansio, a combination post office, civic centre and hotel, lie beneath the streets of modern Moulsham, and the ruins of an octagonal temple are located beneath the Odeon roundabout. In 2025, archaeologists from Archaeology South East found three bodies during a dig at the former Moulsham Street car park.

An Anglo-Saxon burial was discovered at Broomfield to the north of Chelmsford in the late 19th century and the finds are now in the British Museum. The road 'Saxon Way' now marks the site.

The city's name is derived from Ceolmaer's ford. In the Domesday Book of 1086, it was listed as Celmeresfort. The Domesday Book records that it was then owned by the Bishop of London and had four households, a mill, had three ploughing teams available to the bishop as lord of the manor, 30 acres (12 hectares) of meadow and enough woodland to support 300 pigs. It also gave its name to the wider Chelmsford hundred which covered surrounding villages.

In the year 1100, Maurice, Bishop of London, commissioned the construction of a bridge over the River Can. The bridge meant the traffic flowed through the area instead of Writtle, which grew in importance and size. By 1189 it had changed to Chelmsford.

=== Market town ===
On 7 September 1199, King John granted to William of Sainte-Mère-Eglise a market charter allowing Chelmsford to hold a market. An under-cover market, operating Tuesday to Saturday, is still an important part of the city centre over 800 years later. Chelmsford's first parish church was built around the same time as the grant of the market charter. The church, dedicated to St Mary the Virgin, was completely rebuilt during the 15th century.

The town became the seat of the county assizes during the early 13th century (though assizes were also held at Brentwood) and by 1218 it was recognised as the county town of Essex, a position it has retained to the present day.

=== Royal connections ===
King Robert I of Scotland, better known as Robert the Bruce (1274–1329), had close ties with the nearby village of Writtle and there is some evidence to suggest he was born at Montpeliers Farm in the village, but the story is disputed and possibly conflated with his father, Robert de Brus, 6th Lord of Annandale.

Chelmsford was significantly involved in the Peasants' Revolt of 1381, and King Richard II moved on to the town after quelling the rebellion in London. 'The Sleepers and The Shadows', written by Hilda Grieve in 1988 using original sources, states: "For nearly a week, from Monday 1st July to Saturday 6th July [1381], Chelmsford became the seat of government ... The king probably lodged at his nearby manor house at Writtle. He was attended by his council, headed by the temporary Chancellor ... the new chief justice ... the royal chancery ... Their formidable task in Chelmsford was to draft, engross, date, seal and despatch by messengers riding to the farthest corners of the realm, the daily batches of commissions, mandates, letters, orders and proclamations issued by the government not only to speed the process of pacification of the kingdom, but to conduct much ordinary day-to-day business of the Crown and Government." Richard II famously revoked the charters which he had made in concession to the peasants on 2 July 1381, while in Chelmsford. It could be said that given this movement of government power, Chelmsford for a few days at least became the capital of England. Many of the ringleaders of the revolt were executed on the gallows at what is now Primrose Hill.

King Henry VIII purchased the Boleyn estate in 1516, and built Beaulieu Palace on the current site of New Hall School. This later became the residence of his then mistress, and later wife Anne. Soon after it became the residence of Henry's daughter, by his first marriage, Mary I.

=== Witchfinder General ===
In the 17th century many of the victims of Matthew Hopkins (the self-styled "Witchfinder General") spent their last days imprisoned in Chelmsford, before being tried at the assizes and hanged for witchcraft.

=== Charles Dickens ===
In 1835, when visiting Essex and Suffolk to cover local elections, Charles Dickens visited Chelmsford. He was apparently so upset that he could not find a newspaper on a Sunday that he wrote in a letter to a friend that Chelmsford was "the dullest and most stupid place on earth".

=== Birthplace of radio ===
In 1899 Guglielmo Marconi opened the first "wireless" or radio factory in the world at Hall Street in the Moulsham area of Chelmsford. In 1920 Marconi made the first official publicised sound broadcast in the United Kingdom, featuring Dame Nellie Melba at the New Street Works, the first purpose-built radio factory in the world. In 1922, Marconi made the world's first regular wireless broadcasts for entertainment (call sign "2MT") began from the nearby village of Writtle.

Station 2MT led to the creation of its sister station in London "2LO", which subsequently led to the creation of the BBC.

=== Bishopric ===
In 1914 Chelmsford's parish church was elevated in status to become Chelmsford Cathedral on the creation of the Diocese of Chelmsford, led by the Bishop of Chelmsford.

=== World War II ===
During World War II Chelmsford, an important centre of light engineering war production, was attacked from the air on several occasions, both by aircraft of the Luftwaffe and by missile. The worst single loss of life took place on Tuesday 19 December 1944, when the 367th Vergeltungswaffe 2 or V2 rocket to hit England fell on Henry Road, a residential street near the Hoffmans ball bearing factory and the Marconi Wireless Telegraph Company factory in New Street. Both factories were key to the war effort. Thirty-nine people were killed and 138 injured, 47 seriously. Several dwellings in Henry Road were completely destroyed, and many badly damaged in nearby streets. A monument to the dead is located in the city cemetery on Writtle Road.

On 14 May 1943 Luftwaffe bombing raids hit Chelmsford leaving more than 50 people dead and leaving nearly 1,000 homeless. The bombs hit mainly the town centre, Springfield, and Moulsham.

The GHQ Line part of the British hardened field defences of World War II runs directly through Chelmsford with many pillboxes still in existence to the north and south of the city.

Hylands Park, the site of the former annual V Festival, hosted a prisoner of war camp, and from 1944 until it was disbanded in 1945, was the headquarters of the Special Air Service (SAS).

=== Recent history ===
Since the 1980s defence-related industries in the city have declined, most notably the Marconi Company with all of its factories either being closed or sold. The site on West Hanningfield Road was sold to BAE Systems; the Waterhouse Lane site sold to E2V and the former New Street Works site has undergone major redevelopment for residential/mixed use.

The one-time largest employer in Chelmsford, RHP (the former Hoffman ball bearing manufacturer), closed its New Street/Rectory Lane site in 1989. Some of the factory was converted into luxury apartments and a health club although most of the site was demolished to make way for the Rivermead Campus of the Anglia Ruskin University.

The city's location close to London and at the centre of Essex has helped it grow in importance as a financial, administrative and distribution centre.

The Channels Development, Beaulieu Park, The Village and Chancellor Park are some of the most recent large-scale housing developments built in the city. The local plan targets an additional 18,000 new homes by 2036, in developments largely to the north of the city.

In 2007, the Channel 4 programme Location, Location, Location voted Chelmsford the 8th-best place to live in the UK.

=== City status ===
The letters patent officially granting city status to Chelmsford were received on 6 June 2012. to mark the Diamond Jubilee of Elizabeth II.

The announcement to make Chelmsford a city had been made on 14 March 2012 by the Lord President of the Privy Council and Deputy Prime Minister, Nick Clegg.

== Governance ==
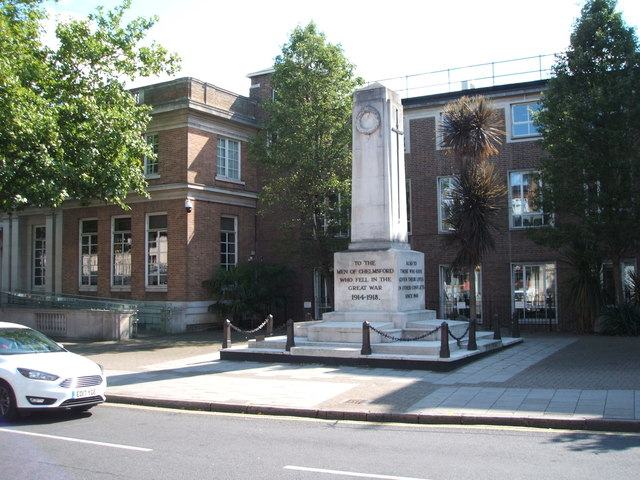
Chelmsford War Memorial with Chelmsford Civic Centre in the background

There are two main tiers of local government covering Chelmsford, at district and county level: Chelmsford City Council and Essex County Council. Both are based in Chelmsford; the city council at Chelmsford Civic Centre on Duke Street, completed in 1935, and the county council at County Hall on Market Road. Most of the built up area is unparished, but some outer parts of the built up area are included in civil parishes, including Great Baddow, Chelmer, Springfield, Chelmsford Garden, and Broomfield.

For national elections, the built up area roughly corresponds to the Chelmsford constituency. The constituency has been represented by Marie Goldman of the Liberal Democrats since the 2024 general election.

The headquarters of Essex Police is located in the Springfield area of the city at Kingston Crescent.

=== Administrative history ===
The ancient parish of Chelmsford formed part of the Chelmsford hundred of Essex.

Despite its importance as county town, Chelmsford was not an ancient borough. A body of improvement commissioners was established in 1789 to provide certain local government functions to the built up area as it then was, comprising the core of the town between the rivers Chelmer and Can and the suburb of Moulsham south-west of the Can. In 1850 the whole parish of Chelmsford was made a local board district, with an elected local board replacing the commissioners.

The parish was incorporated as a municipal borough in 1888. The borough was substantially enlarged in 1907, taking in the suburbs north-east of the Chelmer which had been in the parish of Springfield, including the core of the old village of Springfield itself, as well as areas on the western side of the town which had been in the parish of Writtle. The borough was enlarged again in 1934 to take in 1,659 acres (671 hectares) from Chelmsford Rural District, including Widford (which was abolished as a parish as part of the 1934 reforms) as well as areas ceded from the neighbouring parishes of Broomfield, Springfield, and Writtle.

The municipal borough was abolished in 1974 under the Local Government Act 1972. The area merged with the surrounding Chelmsford Rural District which had covered the surrounding villages and rural areas to form a new non-metropolitan district called Chelmsford. The area of the pre-1974 borough was left unparished as a result of the 1974 reforms. Since 1974 the built up area has grown beyond the unparished area. The Office for National Statistics now defines a Chelmsford built up area which extends into several neighbouring parishes.

== Demography ==
The population of Chelmsford in the 1841 census was 3,883.

The following statistics were measured in the 2021 Census:

- The population for Chelmsford consisted of:
  - Sex Male: 49.0%, Female: 51%.
  - Age 19 or under: 22.7%, over 65: 19.4%.
  - Ethnicity Born in the UK: 88.1%, White: 88.5%, Afro-Caribbean/African: 2.6%, Asian: 5.3%, Mixed: 2.6%, Other: 0.9%.
  - Religion Christian: 48%, No religion: 41.2%, Muslim: 2.0%, Hindu: 1.7%.
- Economic Activity (over 16s):
  - Economically Active 61.6%.
    - In Employment: 59.3%, Unemployed: 2.2%.
  - Economically Active and Full-time student 1.9%
    - In Employment: 1.5%, Unemployed 0.4%.
  - Economically Inactive 36.5%
    - Retired: 23.0%, Student 4.0%, Looking after home or family: 4.3%, Long-term sick or disabled: 2.5%, Other 2.8%

== Economy ==
=== Business and commerce ===
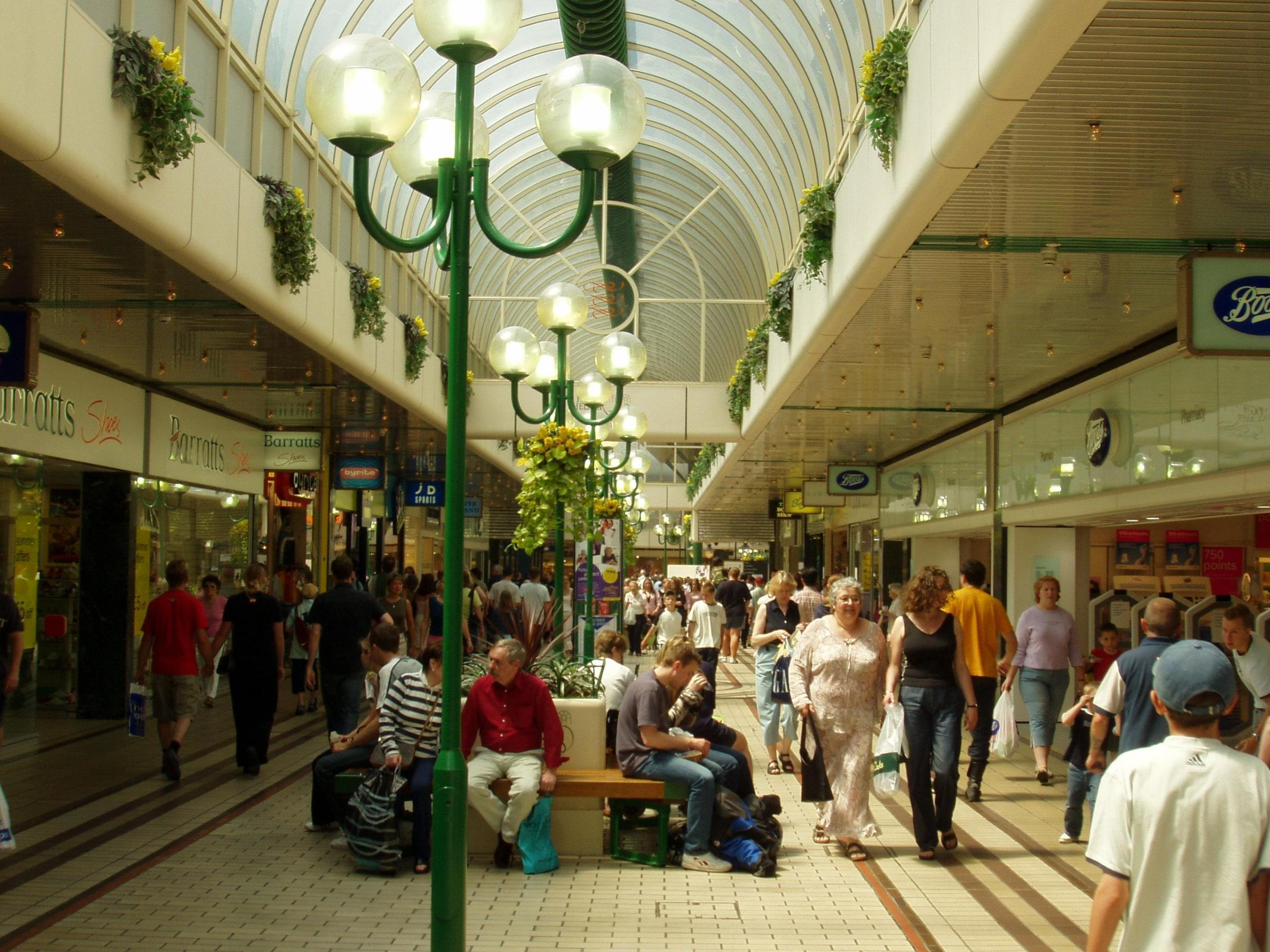
High Chelmer Shopping Centre prior to the 2009 refurbishment

Originally an agricultural and market town, Chelmsford has been an important centre for industry since the 19th century. Following the opening of the Chelmer and Blackwater Navigation in 1797, cheaper transportation and raw materials made milling and malting the main industries until the 1850s, when increasing prosperity created a local market for agricultural machinery.

Foundries and engineering works followed including Fell Christy at his Factory (In later years known as Christy Norris Ltd) on the corner of Kings Road and Broomfield Road opened 1858, closed 1985, Coleman and Moreton, Thomas Clarkson (Steam Omnibus manufacturer and Founder of the Eastern National Bus Company) and Eddington and Stevenson (makers of traction engines). The Company Christy Norris still survives, trading as Christy Turner Ltd based in Ipswich. A residential street close to the old Factory was named "Fell Christy" in his honour.

As well as the headquarters of Essex Police, Essex County and Chelmsford City Councils, the modern city is home to a range of national and international companies including M&G Group, Teledyne e2v and ebm-papst.

Chelmsford is largely a commercial city which employs around 80,000 people. There are three medium-sized shopping centres, Bond Street, High Chelmer and The Meadows. Chelmsford has six retail parks, Riverside, Chelmer Village, Clocktower Retail Park, The Army & Navy, Moulsham Lodge Retail Park and the smaller Homelands Retail Park housing a Flagship B&Q Store, Wyvale Garden Centre (part of the Garden centre Group) and Pets Corner. The High Street has a variety of independent and chain stores. On 29 September 2016 a new retail development opened anchored by John Lewis.

On 6 January 2005, Chelmsford was granted Fairtrade Town status.

Sizeable businesses are now based in the Chelmsford Business Park at Boreham housing companies such as the Anderson Group and Global Marine Systems. Chelmsford is a centre for national electricity suppliers operating within the industrial and commercial sectors, with both EnDCo and F&S Energy headquartered within the city. The city has a low unemployment rate (1.6% in 2002) and a well-educated workforce, with 9% holding a degree or above (in 2002; British average: 7.1%).

Chelmsford city centre contains a concentration of pubs, licensed bars, and restaurants that support an established evening and night-time economy. The city holds Purple Flag accreditation from the Association of Town and City Management, reflecting standards in venue variety, safety, and transport accessibility for visitors across central Essex.

=== Marconi ===
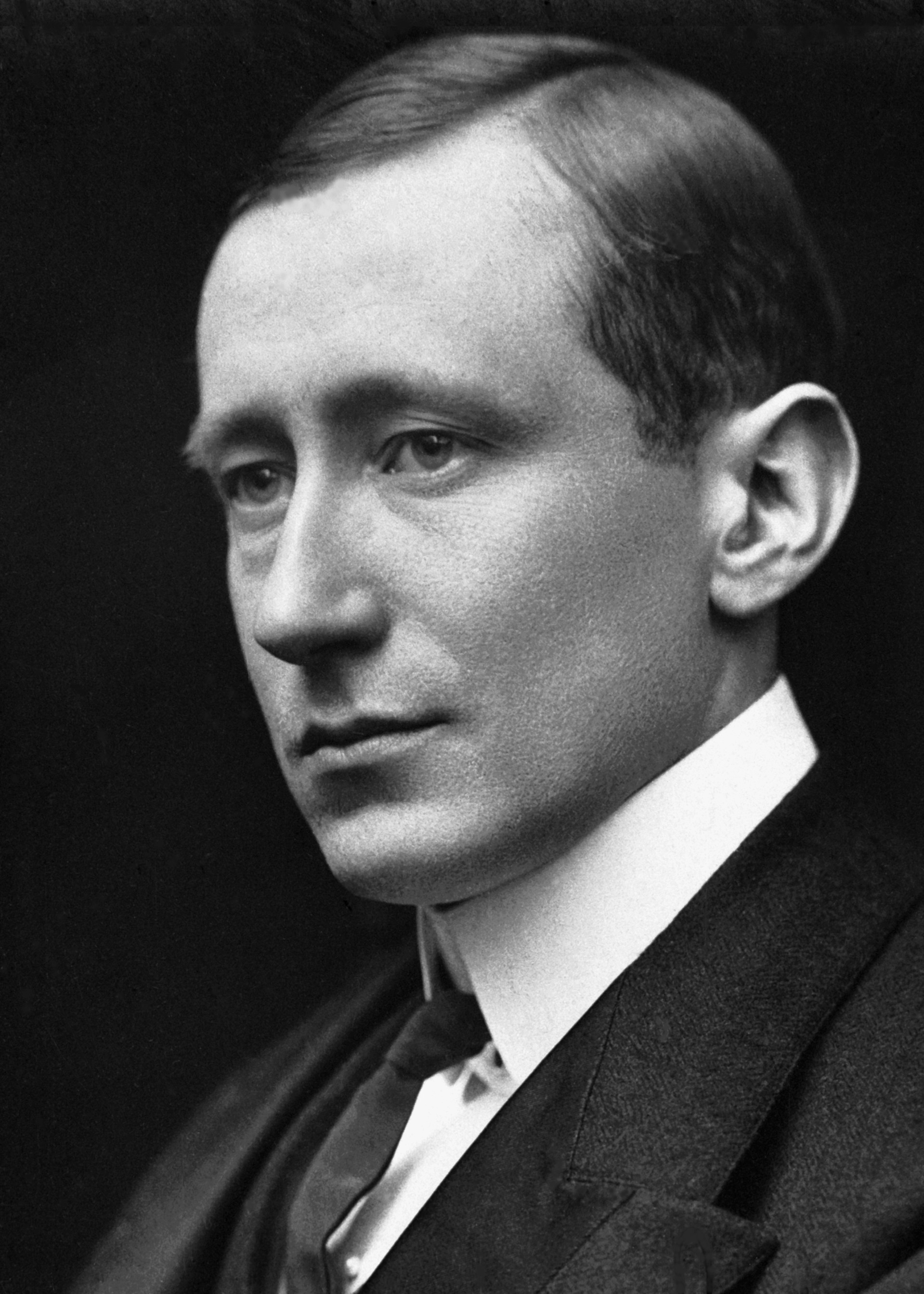
Guglielmo Marconi

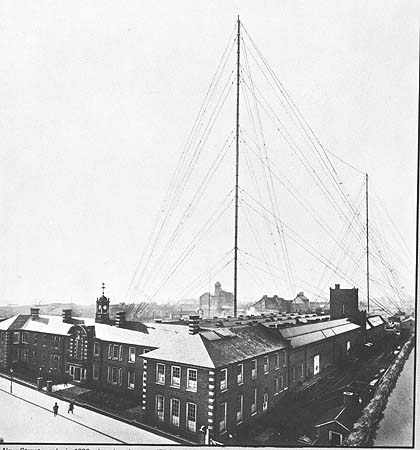
Marconi's new street factory in 1920

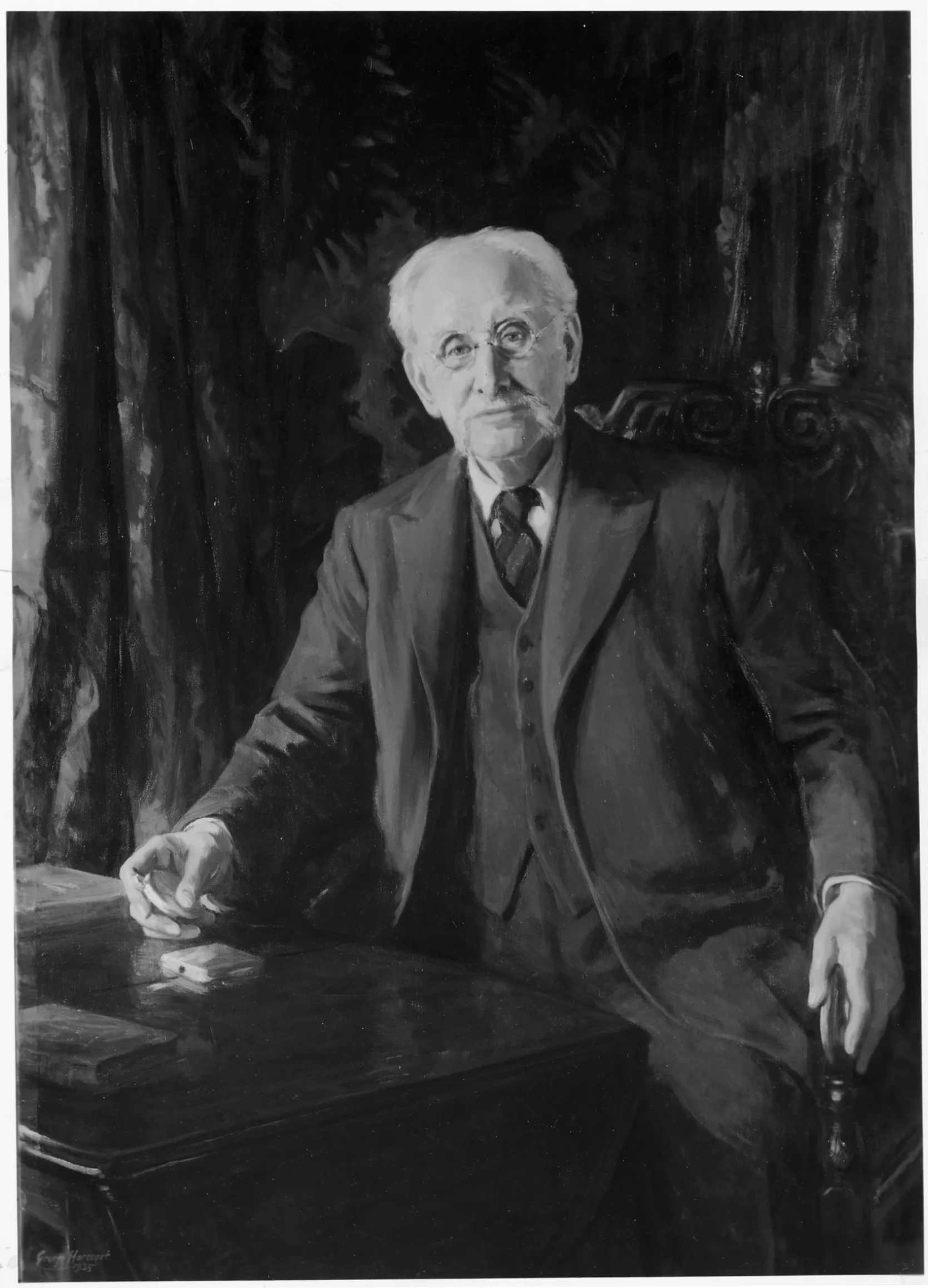
Colonel Rookes Evelyn Bell Crompton

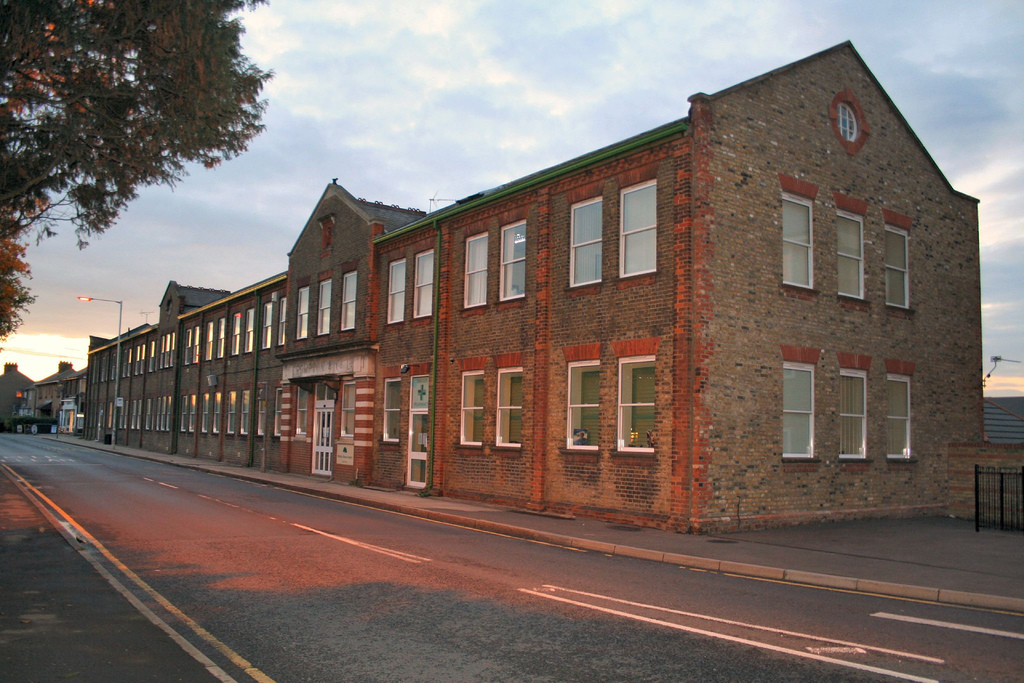
The frontage to Colonel Crompton's former Arc Works in Writtle Road

In 1899, Guglielmo Marconi opened the world's first "wireless" factory under the name 'The Marconi Wireless Telegraph & Signal Company' in Hall Street, employing around 50 people. The company was later called the Marconi Wireless Telegraph Company Ltd. For this reason Chelmsford is credited as the "birthplace of radio", and this phrase can be seen on administrative signs on major roads entering the city, although this statement is disputed.

Outgrowing its Hall Street premises, Marconi moved to the purpose-built 70,000-square-foot (6,500-square-metre) New Street Works in June 1912. On 15 June 1920 the factory hosted the first official publicised sound broadcast in the United Kingdom, featuring Dame Nellie Melba and using two 450-foot (140-metre) radio broadcasting masts.

In 1922, the world's first regular wireless broadcasts for entertainment began from the Marconi laboratories at Writtle near Chelmsford – Call sign '2MT' in what was little more than a wooden hut.

In 1999, Marconi's defence division, including the Chelmsford facilities, was purchased by British Aerospace to form BAE Systems. Two sites remain under BAE control; the Great Baddow site which is now BAE's Advanced Technology Centre and its Integrated Systems Technologies business at Glebe Road.

The military and secure communications division of Marconi was merged into Selex Communications based at the New Street factory. They vacated the site in April 2008 with the remaining operations moved to nearby Basildon, bringing to an end more than 100 years of the Marconi name in Chelmsford.

The New Street factory was scheduled to be redeveloped starting in 2010, but this fell through when site owners Ashwell Property Group entered administration in December 2009. The factory remained empty, derelict and vandalised for several years, to the dismay of Marconi Veterans and Chelmsfordians. The site was sold for redevelopment to Bellway Homes in the summer of 2012 with demolition of the majority of the site including the iconic Marconi House and Building 720 in April/May 2013. Only the Grade II listed water tower, The 1912 front building façade, the New Street cottages, and the power house will remain.

=== Cromptons Electrical Engineering ===
Chelmsford became home to the United Kingdom's first electrical engineering works established by Rookes Evelyn Bell Crompton. Crompton was a leading authority on electrical engineering, and pioneered electric street lighting and electric traction motors within the United Kingdom. He installed electric street lights in the town centre to celebrate the incorporation of the Borough of Chelmsford in 1888. Although this made Chelmsford one of the earliest towns to receive electric street lighting, the council later removed them because gas from the council-owned gasworks was cheaper. Crompton supplied the traction motors for the first electric trains on Southend Pier. The company manufactured electrical switchgear, alternators and generators for many power stations in the UK and worldwide.

Crompton set up his original factory known as the 'Arc Works' in Queen Street in 1878. After a fire there in 1895, he built a huge new electrical engineering factory also called the 'Arc Works' in Writtle Road. Crompton and Co. became Crompton Parkinson in 1927 when Colonel Crompton partnered with fellow electrical engineer Frank Parkinson. During World War II, the factory was frequently targeted by the Luftwaffe. In 1969 a takeover by Hawker Siddeley saw Crompton Parkinson Ltd downsized and operations moved elsewhere. The Marconi Company took over the site which became the base for the newly formed Marconi Radar Systems.

After years of decline, the Marconi factory closed in 1992 and the site was demolished a few years later apart from the frontage on Writtle Road. 'The Village' housing development now occupies the site with road names such as Rookes Crescent, Evelyn Place, Crompton Street and Parkinson Drive as tributes to the former occupant.

=== Hoffmann Ball Bearings ===
Hoffmann Ball bearings was a major employer in Chelmsford in the late 19th and early 20th centuries. They produced ball bearings which were used for early transatlantic flight.

They opened a second factory at Stonehouse, Gloucestershire in the 1930s, alongside the Stroudwater Navigation.

The firm became Ransome Hoffmann and Pollard (R.H.P.) after Hoffman's amalgamation with Ransome & Marles and Pollard Ball and Roller Bearing Company in 1969.

The R.H.P. brand, intellectual property rights and company assets were absorbed into the Japanese NSK Ltd. bearing company in early 1990 trading as NSK-RHP Ltd. at its UK base in Newark on Trent with the historic R.H.P. name finally disappearing in 2001.

Most of the former Hoffman New Street factory was demolished during the summer of 1990 and the site is now occupied by the sprawling Rivermead Campus of the Anglia Ruskin University.

The only connection to the company name in Chelmsford today is the RHP Bowls club located on part of the old Hoffmans Social Club site at Canterbury Way and Hoffmans Way at the corner of the old factory site at New Street and Rectory Lane.

=== English Electric Valve Company ===
The Waterhouse Lane–based company began in the early 1940s as a part of the Marconi group, manufacturing magnetrons for defence radar systems. The company was first registered as a separate company in Chelmsford, Essex in 1947 under Simeon Serge Aisenstein. Its initial name was the Phoenix Dynamo Co Ltd, though it immediately changed its name to English Electric Valve Company Ltd.

In 1959 Bob Coulson established Traveling-wave tube and Microwave tube sections and they were producing ceramic hydrogen thyratrons as well. By this time EEV was the largest hi-tech manufacturing company in the UK. A year later they won an EMMY award for outstanding contribution to Electronics Technology in developing the 4½" orthicon tube.

In 1961 they acquired Associated Electrical Industries Valve business based in Lincoln. Sir Charles Oatley was a director of the company from 1966 to 1985. In 1962, EEV opened its first office in America in Buffalo, NY. In the 1970s EEV collaborated with QinetiQ in the development of the pyroelectric vidicon, the first thermal imaging detector. The company has received 13 Queen's Awards for Technology in its history, most recently in 2006 for low light imaging devices and in 2004 for thyratrons for cancer radiotherapy treatment. In 1972, they opened an office in Paris and in 1977 they opened another in New York; this time in Elmsford. Keith Attwood, e2v's CEO joined in 1999, as MD of EEV, after a short period as Marconi Applied technologies, the company was renamed to e2v technologies in 2002 as part of a management buy out supported by 3i following the collapse of the Marconi group. Following further growth under 3i, in 2004 the company floated on the London Stock Exchange.

In 2017, e2v was acquired by US company Teledyne Technologies and changed its name to Teledyne e2v, 70 years after its registration as a Chelmsford-based company. As of 2022, Teledyne e2v continues its operations at the Waterhouse Lane site.

=== Britvic ===
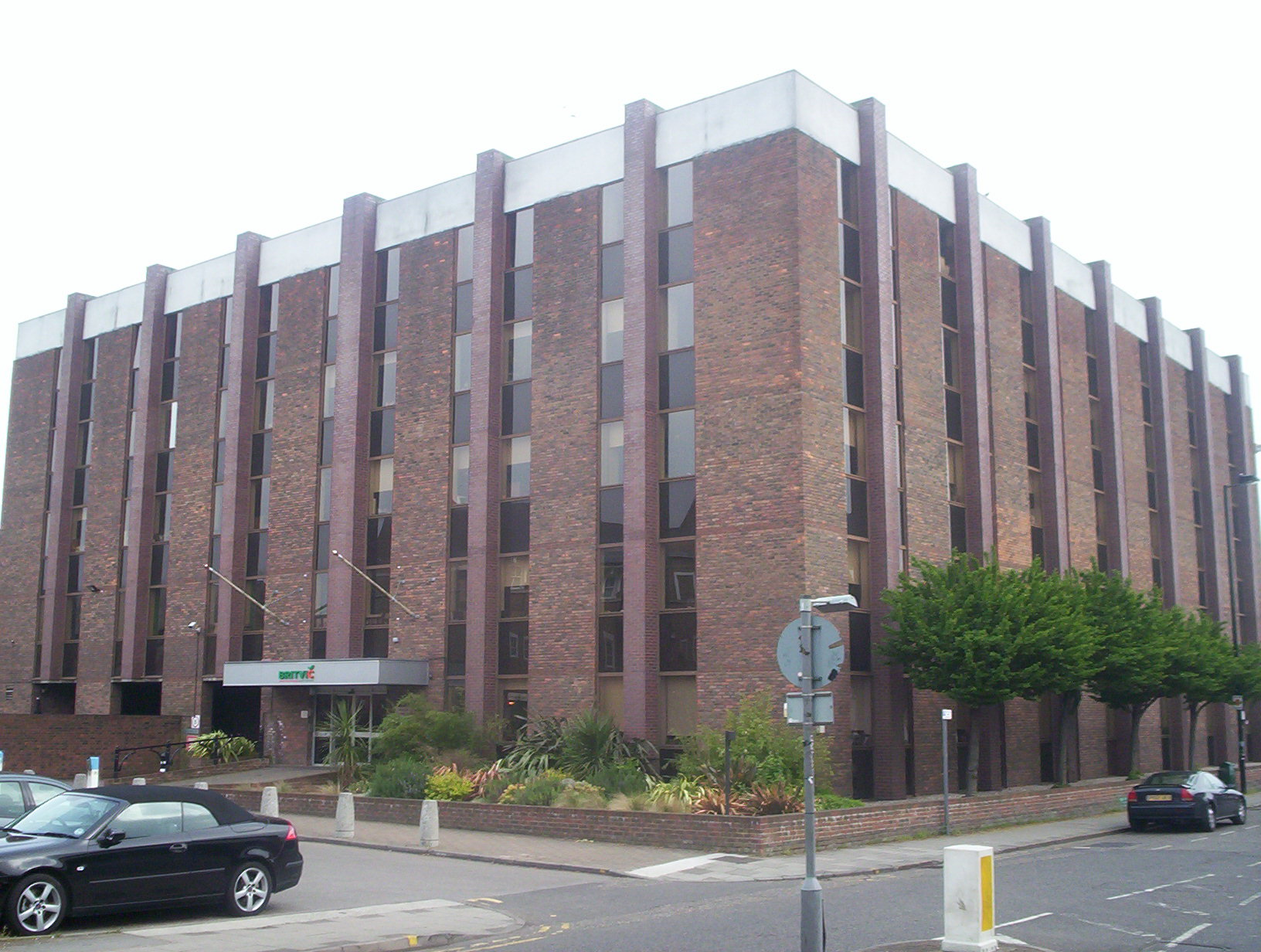
Britvic House, the former Britvic headquarters

The Britvic soft drink company began life as the British Vitamin Company in 1948. The origins of the company can be traced back to a chemist's shop in Tindal Street where flavoured waters were on sale as early as the mid-19th century.

The company was acquired by Showerings of Shepton Mallet, and subsequently a division of Allied Breweries from 1968, The British Vitamin Company changed its name to Britvic in 1971. In 1986 it merged with Canada Dry Rawlings and acquired the R. White's Lemonade brand. It acquired Tango from Beechams in 1987 and since that year it has owned the UK franchise for Pepsi and 7 Up. In 1995 it bought Robinson's from Reckitt & Colman.

In December 2005 the Company underwent an initial public offering (IPO) allowing its main shareholders (InterContinental Hotels Group, Whitbread, Pernod Ricard) to realise their investments.

In May 2007 the company went on to buy the soft drinks and distribution businesses of Ireland's Cantrell & Cochrane (C&C) for £169.5m.

On 14 November 2012 the Company agreed to merge with Scotland's A.G. Barr, producer of Scottish soft drinks Irn-Bru, Tizer and D'n'B, to create one of Europe's largest soft drinks companies. However the merger was put into serious doubt after the Office of Fair Trading referred the merger to the Competition Commission.

The Britvic UK headquarters at Britvic House in Broomfield Road closed in March 2012. It relocated to Hemel Hempstead to facilitate better transport links for its staff.

On 14 March 2014 the Britvic Westway factory closed for good thus ending the company's 150-year association with the city.

== Transport ==
=== Railway ===
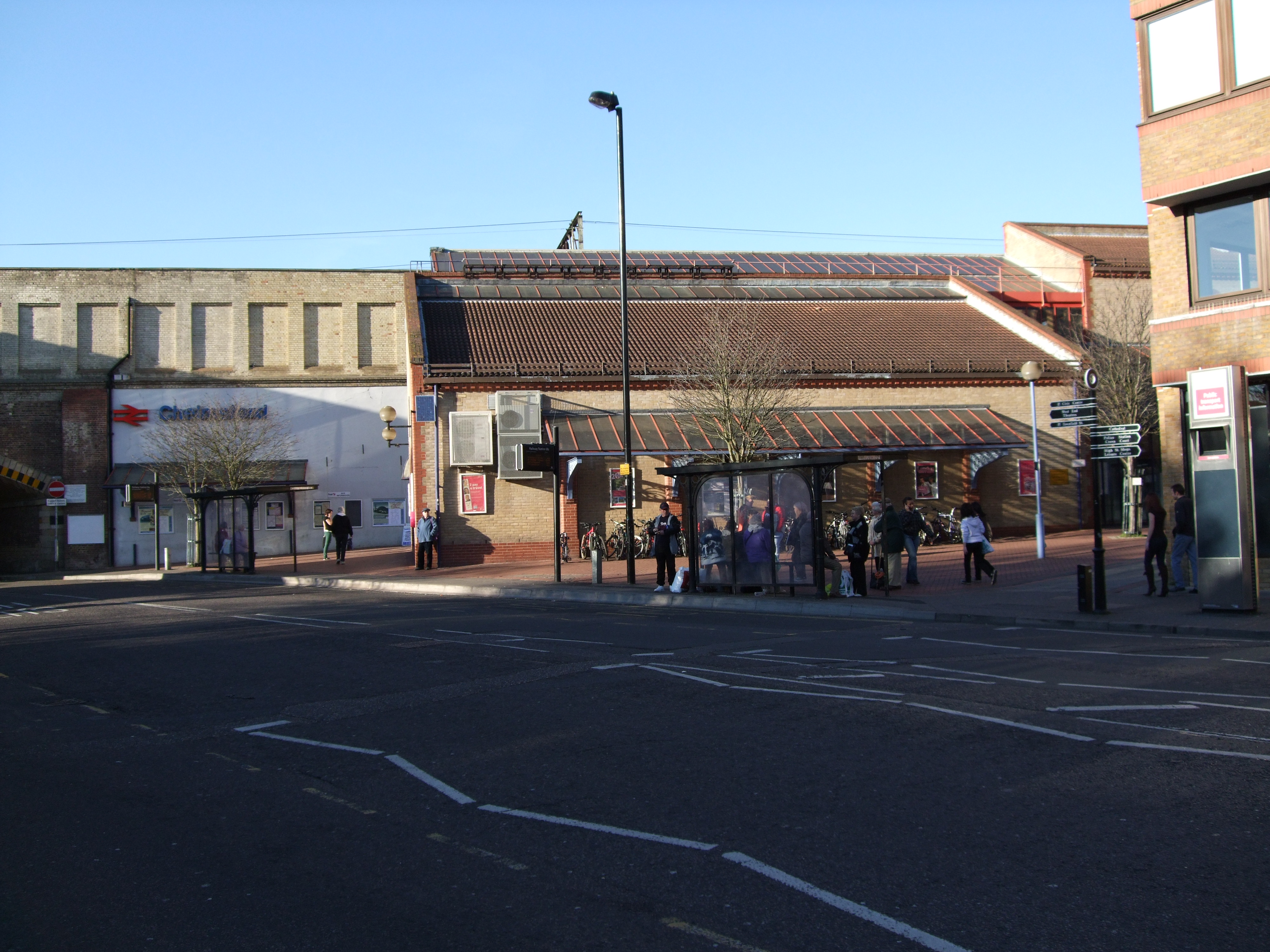
Chelmsford station entrance

The Eastern Counties Railway arrived in Chelmsford in 1842. Owing to the geography of the city, three viaducts were constructed: the longest of which has 18-arches through Central Park; the station is at the end of the second viaduct; and the third is at the River Chelmer, Springfield. The current station dates from around 1885.

Greater Anglia operates all services at Chelmsford railway station:

- Southbound services operate to London Liverpool Street, via Shenfield and Stratford
- Northbound services run to Beaulieu Park, Colchester, Ipswich, Clacton-on-Sea, Harwich, Braintree and Norwich, via the Great Eastern Main Line.

Around 14,000 commuters each day travel to Liverpool Street by train, making Chelmsford one of the busiest non-terminus stations outside London.

A new second railway station for Chelmsford opened on 26 October 2025. Beaulieu Park station primarily serves the Beaulieu housing developments to the north-east of the city.

=== Buses ===
The current bus terminal in Duke Street is the focal point of services in the city. It replaced the ageing 1930s bus station in March 2007 with shops, apartments and a covered roof for passengers.

Routes are operated by the following companies:

- First Essex is the primary operator, running many routes around the city and beyond including to Basildon, Billericay, Braintree, Colchester, Maldon and Southend. It also operates the X10/X30 Essex Airlink to Stansted Airport. There are a variety of school buses serving the city and surrounding areas.
- Arriva Colchester operates a single service, the 59 route, to Harlow, via Roxwell, The Rodings, Hatfield Heath and Old Harlow.
- Other bus companies serve the area including Stephensons of Essex and Hedingham & Chambers.

Outside of peak times, many of these services are run under contract to Essex County Council.

Essex County Council's Highways and Transportation Department have considered constructing a Bus Rapid Transit System to be built serving the Beaulieu Park/Springfield Area because of the increasing demand for Rapid Transit Plans in Ipswich, Colchester and Southend.

Chelmsford has a park & ride service at nearby Sandon, just off junction 18 of the A12; it runs Monday to Saturday, with a capacity of 1,200 cars. Opened in March 2006, it has proved highly successful and is used widely.

A second service, known as the Chelmer Valley Park and Ride, was opened on the A130/A131 to the north of the city near Little Waltham in April 2011.

=== Road ===
The A12, which connects East London and Lowestoft, was originally built by the Romans to connect London and Colchester. It used to run through the city, until the £34.8m nine-mile (14 km) bypass around the east opened in November 1986. Despite being notorious for frequent congestion, poor road surfaces, potholes and accidents, many people move to Chelmsford for it being so well connected by road and rail.

The A414 between Hemel Hempstead and Maldon is a main road into the city, just off the A12, and links the city to junction 7 of the M11 in the west, near Harlow.

The A130 provides a link to the A127 and A13, while the A131 passes through smaller towns and villages. The nearest motorway is the M25 London Orbital at J11 of the A12, 14 miles away, near Brentwood.

In the south-west of the city centre, the A138 meets the A414 at the Army and Navy roundabout which is notorious for its traffic congestion:

- Traffic lights were tried to improve matters in the early 2000s, but that scheme was abandoned after a short while; some of the lights were recommissioned for early morning and evening part-time use in 2009.
- The recently built bus lane on the A1114 Great Baddow bypass, and priority to traffic using it, has meant traffic queues approaching the roundabout can now be over 1 mi (1.6 km) long during peak periods.
- The roundabout is known as the Army and Navy even though the public house and music venue from which the junction got its name has long been demolished.
- Until 2019, the junction had an unusual bi-directional flyover (in a similar manner to the Hogarth Roundabout in Chiswick); it was open for city-bound traffic westerly until 2.30 pm each day and then easterly out of the city after 2.30 pm. The Army and Navy roundabout flyover was condemned as unsafe and was permanently closed in September 2019 by Essex County Council with demolition works taking place in February/March 2020.
- Construction of the £32 million replacement A138 Chelmer Viaduct road, which connects Chelmer Village Way roundabout to the Army and Navy roundabout, began in February 2015. The new bridge replaced the previous structure, built in 1932, which was demolished in 2016.
- On 15 January 2024, final plans were announced for the £81m Army and Navy sustainable transport package by Essex County Council including a so-called 'hamburger' roundabout due for completion by 2028.

Since 2 September 2013, to save money and reduce carbon emissions, many street lights in the Chelmsford district switched over to Essex County Council's part-night street lighting scheme. This involves most street lights being switched off between 1:00 am and 5:00 am (Tuesday to Sunday) with exceptions such as the city centre area, key road junctions, some pedestrian crossings and known accident sites; on Monday mornings, the switch off is from midnight to 5:00 am.

=== Air ===
Chelmsford is 25 to 30 minutes by road from Stansted Airport (via A130/A120); London Heathrow, London Gatwick, London City, Luton and Southend airports are all within reach by rail.

=== Future transport plans ===
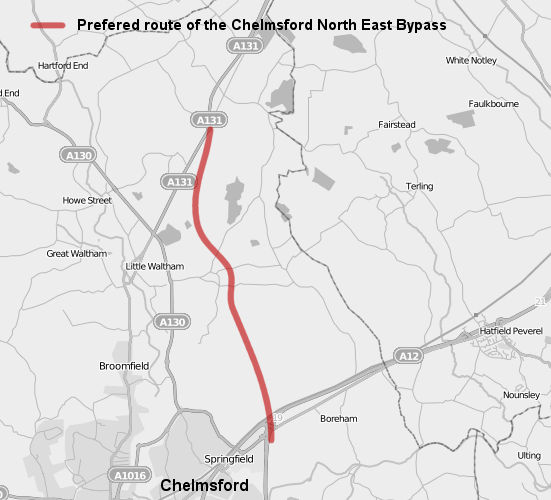
Map of route for the proposed new Chelmsford bypass

Proposals for a bypass of Chelmsford connecting the A12 interchange at Boreham (junction 19) and the A131 were put forward for public consultation by Essex County Council in 2006; the preferred route was announced in March 2007. It comprises the creation of 7.9 km (4 15/16 mi) of two-lane dual carriageway and junctions connecting to the A12 and A131, it will sever 10 footpaths/bridleways and involve almost entirely greenfield construction.

The scheme was estimated to cost £138 million in March 2007 but was increased to an estimated range of £229 – £262 million in February 2008. The scheme still requires funding and planning permission with applications timetabled for 2009–2011, a public inquiry timetabled for 2012 and with an estimated construction start date of 2014–2016. The Chelmsford North Action Group (NAG) objects to this scheme, stating that Chelmsford was to "be engulfed by huge motorways connecting the Channel Ports, via a new Lower Thames Crossing, A130, on to Stansted, M11 and A14".

== Redevelopment ==
A major new development on the Duke Street site of the old 1930s bus station was completed in 2007, which contains a new smaller bus station, shops and luxury apartments. The lower level apartments of this development and the bus station area is known as Marconi Plaza, while the upper level apartments are known as the Kings Tower. The new bus station and shops were opened in January 2007, while the rest of the development was ready in September 2007.

A new housing development site near Beaulieu Park, towards the north of the city, is currently under construction; it will be an urban village containing around 3,500 homes.

The public house The Army and Navy, from which the roundabout gets its name, was demolished in March 2007. It was replaced by a Travelodge hotel, a Frankie & Benny's restaurant, a bed store and private apartments. Building work started at the site in October 2007 and the project was completed in December 2008.

Recently, plans were revealed for Waterside, a large development of shops, bars and restaurants on the banks of the River Chelmer on derelict land near the Essex Records Office, at the end of Wharf Road. If this development goes ahead, High Bridge Road, which connects Parkway and Springfield Road, would be demolished along with the adjacent gasometers and a new central link road would be built.

The former Anglia Ruskin University central campus, off Park Road, was demolished in January/February 2010; it has been redeveloped by social housing provider Genesis as a mixed use development of housing for social rent, alongside other new housing for private sale and several retail units, new squares, streets and plazas. The new development has been given the name City Park West.

High Chelmer shopping centre underwent a refit during 2008/2009 with new flooring, lighting with a new front entrance and a rebounded logo. Further work is being carried out in the shopping centre; an old portion was demolished in spring 2011 and the work was completed in early 2012.

In January 2011, John Lewis announced, together with development partner Aquila House Holdings, that it was to anchor a brand new 119,000-square-foot (11,100 m^{2}) department store as part of a 300,000-square-foot (28,000 m^{2}) retail development at Bond Street. The site opened in September 2016.

== Places of interest ==
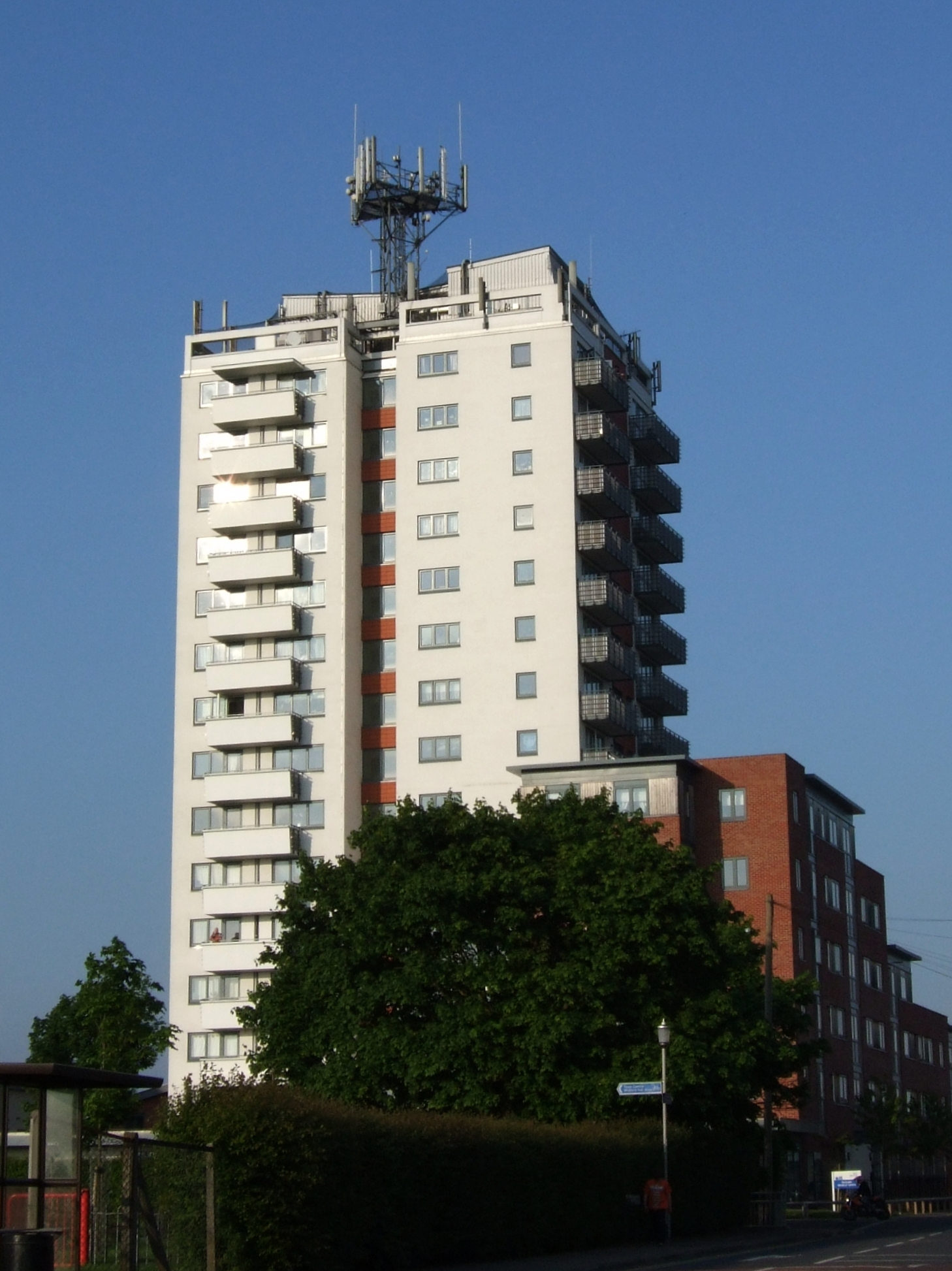
Parkside Court

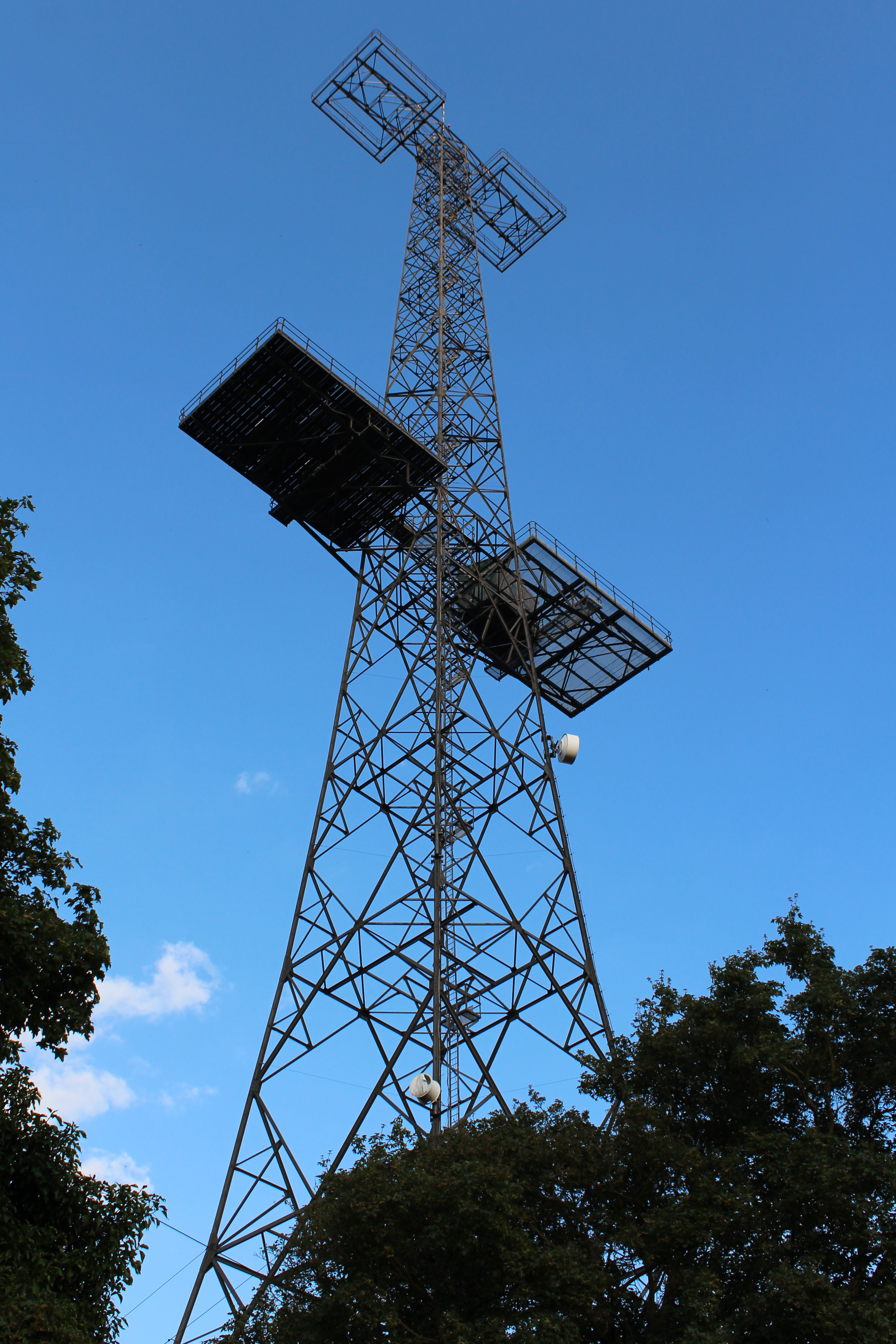
Great Baddow, Chain Home Tower

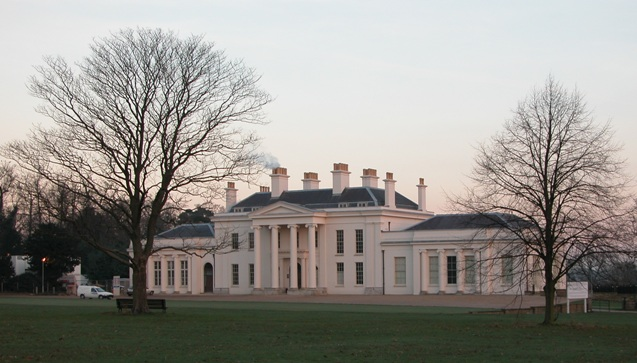
Hylands House

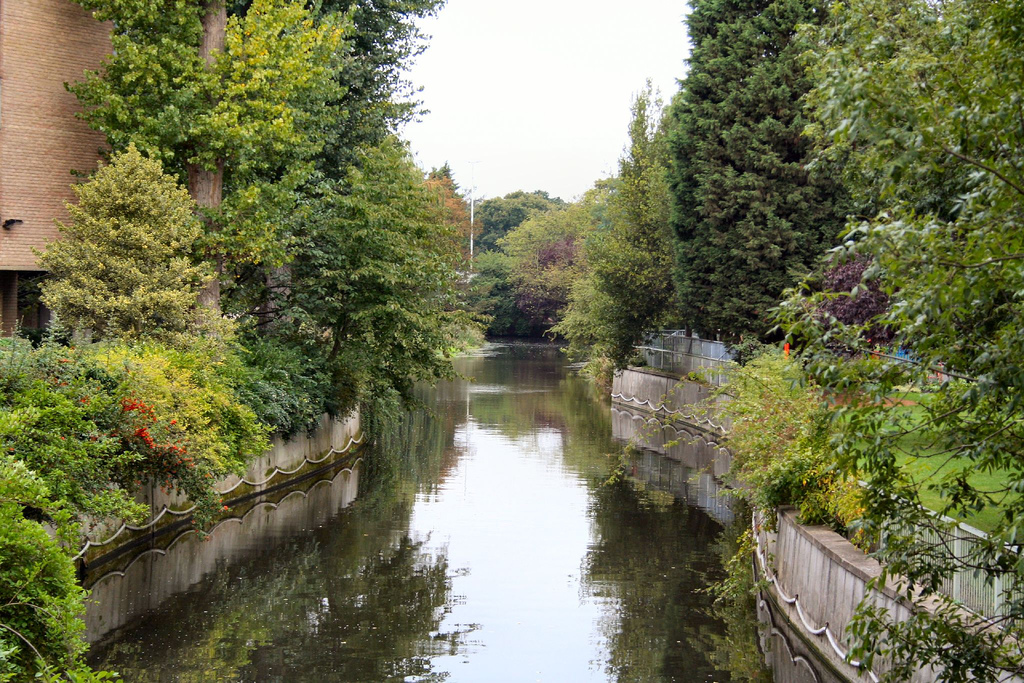
The River Can in the city centre with part of the 1960s flood prevention scheme clearly visible

Hylands House and Park, just to the west of the city, are a country house and parkland which were saved from dereliction after being purchased by the local council in 1966, after the death of the last private owner, and is now open to the public. Dating from 1730, the house was much damaged by fire and vandalism by the time of the sale, but has since been completely restored by Chelmsford City Council and is now available for weddings and other private hires including conferences. The 574 acres (232 hectares) park was landscaped by Humphry Repton has hosted a wide range of community events, including the annual music festival V Festival. The 21st World Scout Jamboree 2007 was held at Hylands Park from 27 July to 8 August 2007. Within the grounds which comprise woodland, rolling grassland and lakes is a large children's play area with adjoining car parking. BBC Radio 2 in the Park will be held there in September 2025.

Chelmsford Museum in Oaklands Park, off Moulsham Street, is a local history and industrial heritage museum which incorporates the Essex Regiment Museum. A major £5 million extension and redevelopment scheme opened in January 2010 and the museum now includes exhibits and interactive displays focusing on Crompton, Marconi, and Hoffmann, as well as illustrating the development of the town and city from prehistory up to modern times. Further development in 2019 upgraded the museum to include new visitor facilities as well as new exhibits from the Saxon burial site at Broomfield. A second site at Sandford Mill – Chelmsford's former waterworks – displays further exhibits from Chelmsford's telecommunications, electrical engineering and rolling bearings industries.

The Shire Hall is situated at the top of the High Street. Opened in July 1791 and built by local architect and Essex county surveyor John Johnson, it features a Portland stone façade. One of the oldest and most prominent buildings in Chelmsford, it was built as a courthouse and there has been a court on the site since at least 1199. However this finally came to an end on 2 April 2012 with the opening of a new magistrates' court a short distance away in New Street.

Chelmsford Cathedral, which is located directly behind the Shire Hall, is one of the oldest buildings in the city. Originally called "St Mary's Church", it became a cathedral when the Diocese of Chelmsford for the Bishop of Chelmsford was created in 1914. It is officially the second smallest in England behind Derby Cathedral.

Chelmsford Prison is a male prison and Young Offenders Institution, constructed in 1830. The 1979 film special of the TV series Porridge with Ronnie Barker was filmed largely on location at Chelmsford Prison, while it was closed for repairs after a fire.

The 1842 constructed, 18-arch Victorian railway viaduct (that spans the River Can in Central Park) is one of three railway viaducts in the city that carry the Great Eastern Main Line. The viaduct was constructed by the Eastern Counties Railway and opened for passenger traffic on 29 March 1843.

Chelmsford's two tallest buildings are:

- Parkside Court, built in 1962 as Melbourne Court in Melbourne Avenue, sometimes locally known as "Melbourne flats", and
- the 13-floor "Kings Tower" in Duke Street, completed in 2007.

They share the same height of 141.04 feet (42.99 m).

The tallest structure by far in the borough is the former Chain Home radar tower in Great Baddow which rises to 360 ft (110 m). The tower was constructed in 1937 and originally stood at the village of Canewdon's former RAF base (1936–1970). However, in 1956 it was relocated to Great Baddow. It is the only Chain Home tower still in its original unmodified form in the United Kingdom and is a highly visible landmark throughout the surrounding area. The tower was finally given Grade II listed building status in October 2019 by Historic England.

== Geography and climate ==
=== Geology ===
From over 600,000 years ago, during the Pleistocene ice age, until the Anglian Stage around 478,000 to 424,000 years ago, the early River Thames flowed through the area where Chelmsford now stands, from Harlow to Colchester, before crossing what is now the North Sea to become a tributary of the Rhine. Consequently, gravel deposits are frequently found in the area and current and former gravel pits in the district are common.

Chelmsford has two rivers, the River Can and the River Chelmer. Although often confused to be the same river in the city centre, they are quite separate until they join towards the east of the city to form the Chelmer and Blackwater Navigation which heads out towards Maldon before flowing into tidal waters at the Blackwater Estuary. In the other direction, the Chelmer comes from the north from its source near Thaxted while the Can comes from the West from Writtle where it separates from the River Wid.

Until the 1960s, these rivers were extremely prone to flooding the city centre area including two disastrous floods in August 1888 (known locally as 'The Great Flood') and in September 1958 (which also badly affected nearby Wickford) causing widespread damage. Flood prevention schemes in the 1960s on both rivers have largely prevented any further incidents here although the natural floodplains to the north and east such as The 'Baddow Meads' and The 'Chelmer Valley' continue to see flooding after prolonged heavy rainfall.

=== Climate ===
As with most of the UK, Chelmsford has a temperate oceanic climate (Cfb in the Köppen climate classification), however due to its proximity to continental Europe, Chelmsford enjoys warm summers and cool but not cold winters, with a relatively narrow annual temperature range and few extremes of temperature. Being in the southeast of England, the city enjoys a warmer climate than most of the United Kingdom and is one of the driest areas in the country. The nearest met office weather station is in Writtle, 2 miles (3 kilometres) west of the city centre.

The record highest temperature recorded in Chelmsford was 39.1 °C (102.4 °F) on 19 July 2022 beating the previous record of 37.7 °C (99.9 °F) which was set on 25 July 2019.

The coldest temperature recorded in Chelmsford was −20.6 °C (−5.1 °F) on 29 January 1947. A low of −18.0 °C (−0.4 °F) was recorded during December 1981, and more recently the temperature fell to −13.0 °C (8.6 °F) on 20 December 2010. Frost is common, occurring on an average of 53 nights of the year.

Rainfall averages 591.8 mm a year, with daily totals of over 1 mm falling on 108.1 days of the year. Thunderstorms are rare and mostly occur during July and August. All averages refer to the 30-year observation period 1981–2010.

Chelmsford was struck by a F1 tornado on 23 November 1981 as part of the record-breaking nationwide United Kingdom tornado outbreak on that day causing some damage in the city centre.

Climate data for Writtle, (Note: Weather station is located 2 miles (3 km) from the Chelmsford city centre.) elevation: 32 m (105 ft), 1981–2010 normals, extremes 1960–present
Month	Jan	Feb	Mar	Apr	May	Jun	Jul	Aug	Sep	Oct	Nov	Dec	Year
Record high °C (°F)	15.1 (59.2)	18.4 (65.1)	22.8 (73.0)	27.0 (80.6)	30.0 (86.0)	34.4 (93.9)	39.1 (102.4)	35.7 (96.3)	32.1 (89.8)	28.6 (83.5)	18.5 (65.3)	16.6 (61.9)	39.1 (102.4)
Mean daily maximum °C (°F)	7.4 (45.3)	7.7 (45.9)	10.7 (51.3)	13.6 (56.5)	17.0 (62.6)	20.2 (68.4)	22.9 (73.2)	22.7 (72.9)	19.3 (66.7)	15.0 (59.0)	10.5 (50.9)	7.7 (45.9)	14.6 (58.3)
Daily mean °C (°F)	4.5 (40.1)	4.4 (39.9)	6.7 (44.1)	8.7 (47.7)	11.9 (53.4)	15.0 (59.0)	17.5 (63.5)	17.3 (63.1)	14.5 (58.1)	11.1 (52.0)	7.2 (45.0)	4.8 (40.6)	10.3 (50.5)
Mean daily minimum °C (°F)	1.5 (34.7)	1.0 (33.8)	2.7 (36.9)	3.8 (38.8)	6.8 (44.2)	9.8 (49.6)	12.0 (53.6)	11.8 (53.2)	9.7 (49.5)	7.1 (44.8)	3.9 (39.0)	1.8 (35.2)	6.0 (42.8)
Record low °C (°F)	−20.6 (−5.1)	−13.3 (8.1)	−11.1 (12.0)	−6.1 (21.0)	−2.8 (27.0)	−1.7 (28.9)	2.2 (36.0)	0.6 (33.1)	−1.1 (30.0)	−6.7 (19.9)	−8.1 (17.4)	−18.0 (−0.4)	−20.6 (−5.1)
Average precipitation mm (inches)	53.2 (2.09)	39.2 (1.54)	40.2 (1.58)	41.6 (1.64)	48.7 (1.92)	49.9 (1.96)	44.3 (1.74)	51.7 (2.04)	48.6 (1.91)	64.1 (2.52)	58.0 (2.28)	52.3 (2.06)	591.8 (23.30)
Average precipitation days (≥ 1.0 mm)	10.8	8.6	9.2	9.2	8.7	8.5	7.3	7.7	7.8	10.1	9.9	10.2	108.1
Mean monthly sunshine hours	58.0	76.1	112.4	165.7	196.6	198.2	209.9	204.0	147.4	113.9	68.7	47.4	1,598.2
Source 1: Met Office
Source 2: KNMI

== Education ==
Higher education in the city is provided at a campus of Anglia Ruskin University (formerly called Anglia Polytechnic) and Writtle University College. Chelmsford College is the main provider of further education in the city. Sixth form colleges are attached to many of the secondary schools listed below.

Secondary school educational establishments in Chelmsford include:

- The Boswells School
- The Beaulieu Park School
- Chelmer Valley High School
- Columbus School and College
- Chelmsford County High School for Girls
- Great Baddow High School
- Hylands School
- King Edward VI Grammar School
- Moulsham High School
- New Hall School
- The Sandon School
- St John Payne Catholic School
- St Peter's College (closed in August 2011 and formerly known as Rainsford High School).
- Thriftwood School and College

Chelmsford includes many primary schools, including The Bishop's C of E & R C Primary School, one of the few joint Anglican and Roman Catholic primary schools in the country

== Society and culture ==
=== Media ===
Chelmsford is often referred to as the Birthplace of Radio or Radio City.

- City Sound Radio is a local radio station which started broadcasting online and on digital services in September 2023, delivering local news, topics, popular music, and a haven for unsigned musicians with session and broadcast performance facilities. It was created to provide more provincial representation at a time when national broadcasters had started to curtail their local obligations. The station begin broadcasting on DAB from February 2026 www.citysound.radio
- Chelmsford Community Radio (CCR) broadcasts to the city on 104.4FM. It started out in 2013 as an internet only station and was granted an FM Licence in 2015. The FM frequency launched in 2017. The station offers a wide range of shows catering for many different tastes as well as offering a platform for many local bands, charities, community groups and businesses. www.chelmsfordcommunityradio.com
- Chelmsford was home to local radio station Chelmsford Radio. The station moved to studios in Southend-on-Sea having vacated its Heybridge premises on 12 January 2009. The station was originally situated in Chelmsford city centre in Cater House until November 2006. This station was previously known as Dream 107.7 until February, and before that, 107.7 Chelmer FM up to 2002. The station began broadcasting on 18 October 1998. It is the local station for mid-Essex. Adventure Radio have owned this station since 2008, where it was purchased from Tindle Radio Ltd. As of 19 February 2015, Chelmsford and Southend Radio re-branded and merged to form Radio Essex.
- Chelmsford has a local opt-out of Heart. Heart Essex (previously Essex FM up to June 2009) has been on air since 12 September 1981 and has been owned by Global Radio since 2007. It moved to studios in Glebe Road in late 2004, having previously been based in Southend-on-Sea. In May 2009, the station was rebranded to The Heart of Essex, Essex FM. In June 2009, the popular Essex FM née Essex Radio name brand was dropped after 28 years. On 3 June 2019 Heart Essex was closed as part of wider changes to the Heart network. It was replaced by Heart East with programs coming from studios in London and Milton Keynes. The Chelmsford studio was closed.
- BBC Essex has been on air since 5 November 1986 and its studios are based in New London Road.
- There is a local Award-winning, Hospital Radio Station based out of Broomfield Hospital, known as Hospital Radio Chelmsford, the station has been running since 1964 and is supported by volunteers. The station broadcasts 24 hours for patients at the hospital but can also be listened to online and via the app. www.hrc.org.uk

Until their closure in the mid-2000s Anglia Television/ITV Anglia had offices located in Chelmsford city centre. Chelmsford is served by London and East Anglia regional variations of the BBC and ITV1. Television signals are received from either the Crystal Palace or Sudbury TV transmitters.

Chelmsford has its own Film Festival which was initially set up in 2017 by a few filmmakers and business owners who live in the Chelmsford area. This takes place predominantly at the Everyman Cinema in Chelmsford.

Publications based in Chelmsford include:

- the Essex Chronicle, which was founded as the Chelmsford Chronicle in 1764. The weekly Essex Chronicle newspaper is the longest in continuous publication in the country. Until the closure of the printing plant in 2002, the paper was printed in the town. It is now printed on presses by the Reach plc Group which now owns the paper.
- Chelmsford Weekly News was a free local paper which ceased production in June 2017.
- a popular publication is the free "Edge" magazine, a primarily volunteer effort aimed at older Chelmsfordians.
- The Face of Chelmsford is a monthly magazine delivered to 12,500 homes in Chelmsford that has now become a digital publication updated daily.
- City Life is a newspaper produced by Chelmsford City Council that is distributed throughout the area.

=== Visual art ===
In May 2022, Chelmsford hosted its first street art festival, Concrete Canvas. The festival saw around 30 murals created in the cities Business Improvement District (BID). The artworks were created by a mix of local and internationally renowned street artists. They range from large pieces, installed on the walls of local businesses to smaller pieces on bollards and Openreach cabinets. The festival was supported by Chelmsford Council and Chelmsford For You.

Concrete Canvas continued in May 2023, an additional 43 artworks were added to the street art trail including work by local artists and international names such as DFace and Shephard Fairey.

=== Religion ===
Chelmsford Cathedral is the second smallest cathedral in England after Derby Cathedral. It was built in the 15th and early 16th centuries, when it was the parish church of the prosperous medieval town. The Diocese of Chelmsford was established in 1914 from part of the Diocese of St Albans. It covers all of Essex and much of East London.

Chelmsford is situated in the Roman Catholic Diocese of Brentwood and the two dioceses are now uniquely (at least within England) conterminous. With the coming of the Reformation the Catholic community of Chelmsford was subjected to the anti-Catholic laws and Chelmsford was the site of the death of a Catholic martyr, Saint John Payne. In the 19th century, native Catholics resurfaced and immigrants helped to build up the Catholic community. There are now three Catholic churches within Chelmsford along with a Norbertine canonry situated on New London Road; St. Philip's Priory and one of the largest Catholic private boarding schools in the country, New Hall School.

Other denominations are represented, the Baptists, Jehovah's Witnesses, Seventh-day Adventist Church, The Church of Jesus Christ of Latter-day Saints, Presbyterians, the Quakers, and the United Reformed Church all have places of worship within the city. The Jehovah's Witnesses' Bethel, or UK supervisory office, is based in Chelmsford.

For the local Muslim community, the majority of whom are Bengali and Pakistani, the Main Jamia Masjid mosque is located on Moulsham Street at the junction with Parkway.

=== Sport ===
Essex County Cricket Club is one of the 18 first-class county clubs that make up the English domestic cricket structure, representing the county of Essex. The club is based at the County Ground in New Writtle Street close to the city centre.

Chelmsford City Football Club plays in the National League South. The club's home ground is at the Chelmsford Sport and Athletics Centre, Melbourne Park, which it shares with Chelmsford Athletic Club. Chelmsford is one of the largest settlements in England without a Football League team. The city is home to the Chelmsford Sunday League, of which there are five divisions consisting of teams from around the area. The former ground of the club the New Writtle Street Stadium hosted greyhound racing which was one of two venues to do so. The other was at Springfield on local farmland on Pump Lane corner which took place during April 1949. The racing at both was independent (not affiliated to the sports governing body the National Greyhound Racing Club) and they were known as flapping tracks, which was the nickname given to independent tracks.

The Chelmsford Rugby Football Club was established in 1920 and for the last 40 years has been playing rugby at Coronation Park in Timpsons Lane. As of 2016 the club has over 300 members and fields up to five senior teams each week. The club as of 2016 plays in the London 1 North league, the sixth tier of English rugby. In addition to the senior teams, there are 150 youth members providing teams from under 6's to under 17's. Chelmsford Hockey Club is a men's and ladies' field hockey club based in the city. It fields eight men's teams and five ladies' teams every weekend. The Ladies' 1st XI compete in the English Hockey League Conference East as of July 2016.

Chelmsford Swimming Club has been running for over 100 years and is located in the Riverside Ice and Leisure building in Chelmsford. Based in the same building are the Chelmsford Chieftains, an ice hockey team that plays in the English National Ice Hockey League. The club promotes the use of junior players and local players from the Chelmsford and Essex area.

Horse racing has been run at two separate venues using the name Chelmsford, neither actually in the city centre itself. The sport originally took place at Chelmsford Racecourse, at Galleywood, from the 18th century until its closure in 1935. A new racecourse was established at Great Leighs in 2008 and subsequently changed its name to Chelmsford City Racecourse.

Since 2014 the city has held a marathon. Starting and ending in the city centre, the marathon takes in the city itself and the surrounding environs. The 2014 edition had over 1000 participants.

The Chelmsford campus of Anglia Ruskin University has many sports teams and facilities.

== Notable people born in Chelmsford ==
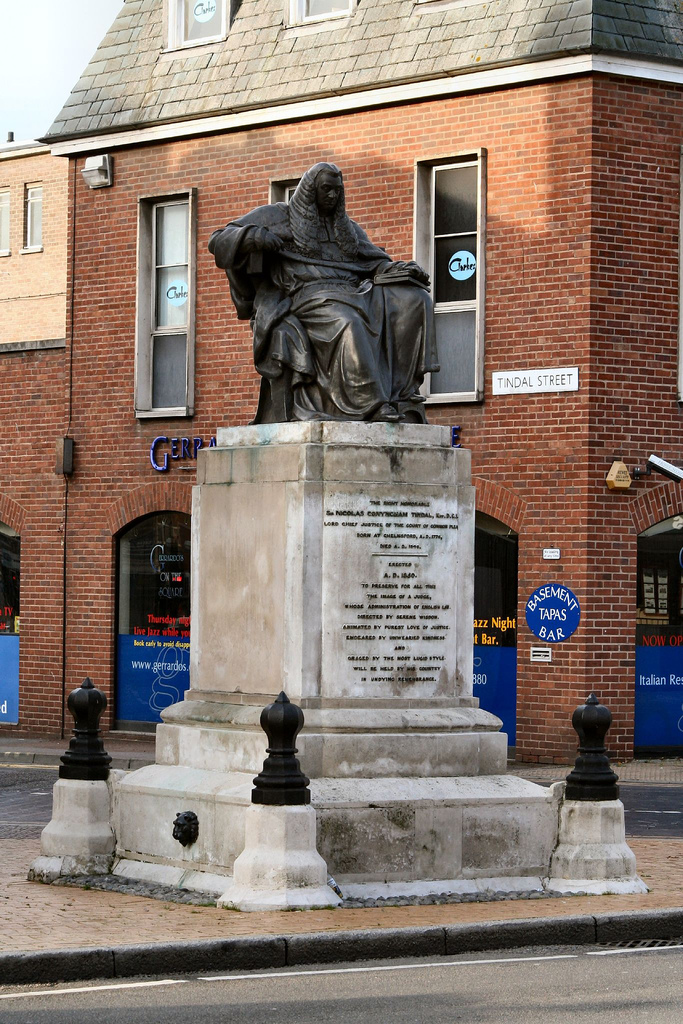
Statue of Sir Nicholas Conyngham Tindal, Tindal Square Chelmsford

=== Musicians ===
- Bon Harris (born 1965), of electronic music group Nitzer Ebb.
- Harry Judd (born 1985), drummer, McFly.
- Hazell Dean (born 1952), singer.
- Reg Webb (born 1947), musician.
- Sarah Cracknell (born 1965), singer, Saint Etienne.
- Brothers Tom Jenkinson (born 1975) and Andy Jenkinson (born 1979), electronic musicians.
- Guthrie Govan (born 1971), Guitarist.

=== Sportspeople ===
- Angela Addison (born 1999), professional footballer.
- Oliver Bearman (born 2005), F1 driver.
- Thomas Bearman (born 2009), racing driver.
- Tom Bury (born 1958), first-class cricketer.
- Liam Chilvers (born 1981), professional footballer.
- Noah Chilvers (born 2001), professional footballer.
- Peter Collins (born 1948), professional footballer.
- Sam Cook (born 1997), cricketer.
- Max Dowman (born 2009), professional footballer.
- Darren Eales (born 1972), former chief executive officer of Premier League football club Newcastle United.
- Nathan French (born 1990), Olympic volleyball player.
- James Gibson (born 1980), swimmer.
- Greg Halford (born 1984), professional footballer.
- James Harper (born 1980), professional footballer.
- Isaac Hayden (born 1995), professional footballer.
- Cameron James (born 1998), professional footballer.
- Gus Kenworthy (born 1991), freestyle skier.
- James Key (born 1972), F1 designer and engineer.
- Malcolm O'Kelly (born 1974), Irish rugby union player.
- Nick Prowting (born 1985), cricketer.
- Nigel Spink (born 1958), professional footballer.
- Ian Stannard (born 1987), road and track cyclist.
- Richard Westbrook (born 1975), racing driver.

=== Actors ===
- Tom Payne (born 1982), actor.
- Mike Edmonds (born 1944), actor.
- Joe Thomas (born 1983), actor.
- Carole Lesley (1935–1974), actress.
- Jack Lowden (born 1990), actor.

=== Artists ===
- Maud Bodkin (1875–1967), classical scholar
- Cheryl Hole (born 1993), drag queen.
- Sir Grayson Perry (born 1960), contemporary artist, broadcaster and cross-dresser.
- Richard Spare (born 1951), artist.

=== Other ===
- Florence Attridge (1901–1975), involved in making secret radio sets used by the resistance during the war.
- George Clift King (1848–1935), former mayor of Calgary, Canada.
- Anne Knight (1786–1862), anti-slavery and feminist activist.
- Sarah Perry (born 1979), writer.
- Joseph Strutt (1749–1802), engraver and antiquary.
- Sir Nicholas Conyngham Tindal (1776–1846), lawyer and judge.
- Jon Morter (born 1974), campaigner.
- Ronald Skirth (1897–1977), World War I veteran.
- Sir Walter Mildmay (1523–1589), Chancellor of the Exchequer of England under Elizabeth I.
- J. A. Baker (1926–1987), writer and naturalist.
- Steve Blame (born 1959), VJ on MTV.
- Ed Woodward (born 1971), former Chief executive officer of Manchester United football club.
- The Lord Dannatt (born 1950), British Army officer, politician.
- Philemon Holland (1552–1637), translator.
- Bryan Butchard (1919–2023), Royal Navy officer known for his valor during World War II

== Twin towns ==
Chelmsford's official twin towns are:

- Annonay, Ardèche, Auvergne-Rhône-Alpes, France
- Backnang, Baden-Württemberg, Germany

The city has a sister city:

- Wuxi, China

== Sources ==
- John Alec Baker: The Peregrine, The Hill of Summer and Diaries (Collins, 2011)
