= River Can =

River in Essex, England

Coordinates: 51°43′48″N 0°28′45″E

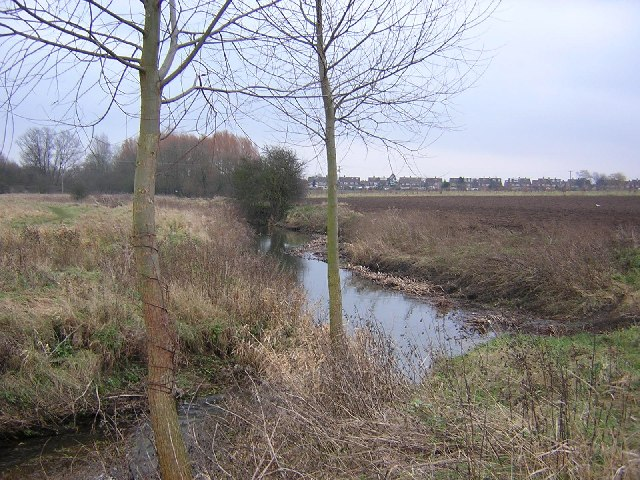
Confluence of the rivers Can and Wid in Writtle

The River Can is a river in Essex, England. Chelmsford is centred on the confluence of the Can and the River Chelmer. The Can enters Chelmsford from the west, joining the Chelmer to the east of the city centre. From the confluence, the Can becomes part of the Chelmer and Blackwater Navigation. The River Wid also meets the Can in the same area.

== History ==
In about 1100, the River Can was bridged, restoring a former Roman road. This led to the growth of Chelmsford around the site of the bridge.

== Tributaries ==
- Right bank: Newland Brook, Roxwell Brook (5.4 km long), River Wid
- Left bank: Parsonage Brook, Chignal Brook (23 km long)
