= Hanningfield =

Hanningfield may refer to:

== People ==
- Paul White, Baron Hanningfield (1940–2024), British politician

== Places in England ==
- East Hanningfield, in Essex
- Hanningfield Green, in Suffolk
- Hanningfield Reservoir, in Essex
- South Hanningfield, in Essex
- West Hanningfield, in Essex
