= Abberton Reservoir =

Reservoir in the United Kingdom

- Site of Special Scientific Interest
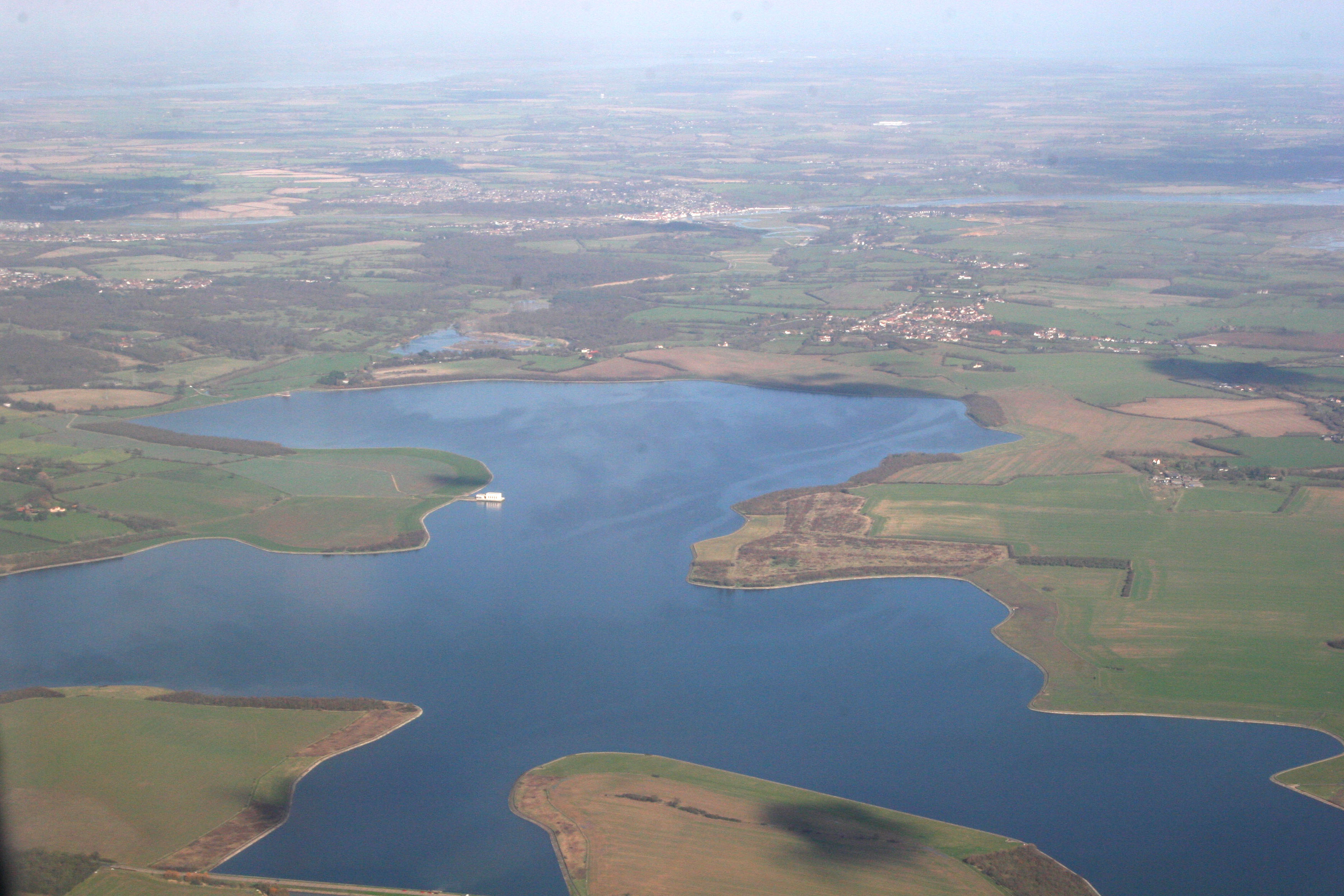
- View from south-west
- Location of Abberton Reservoir.
- Area of search: Essex
- Grid reference: TL970180
- Interest: Biological
- Area: 700 ha (1,700 acres)
- Notification date: 1988
- Location map: Magic Map

Abberton Reservoir
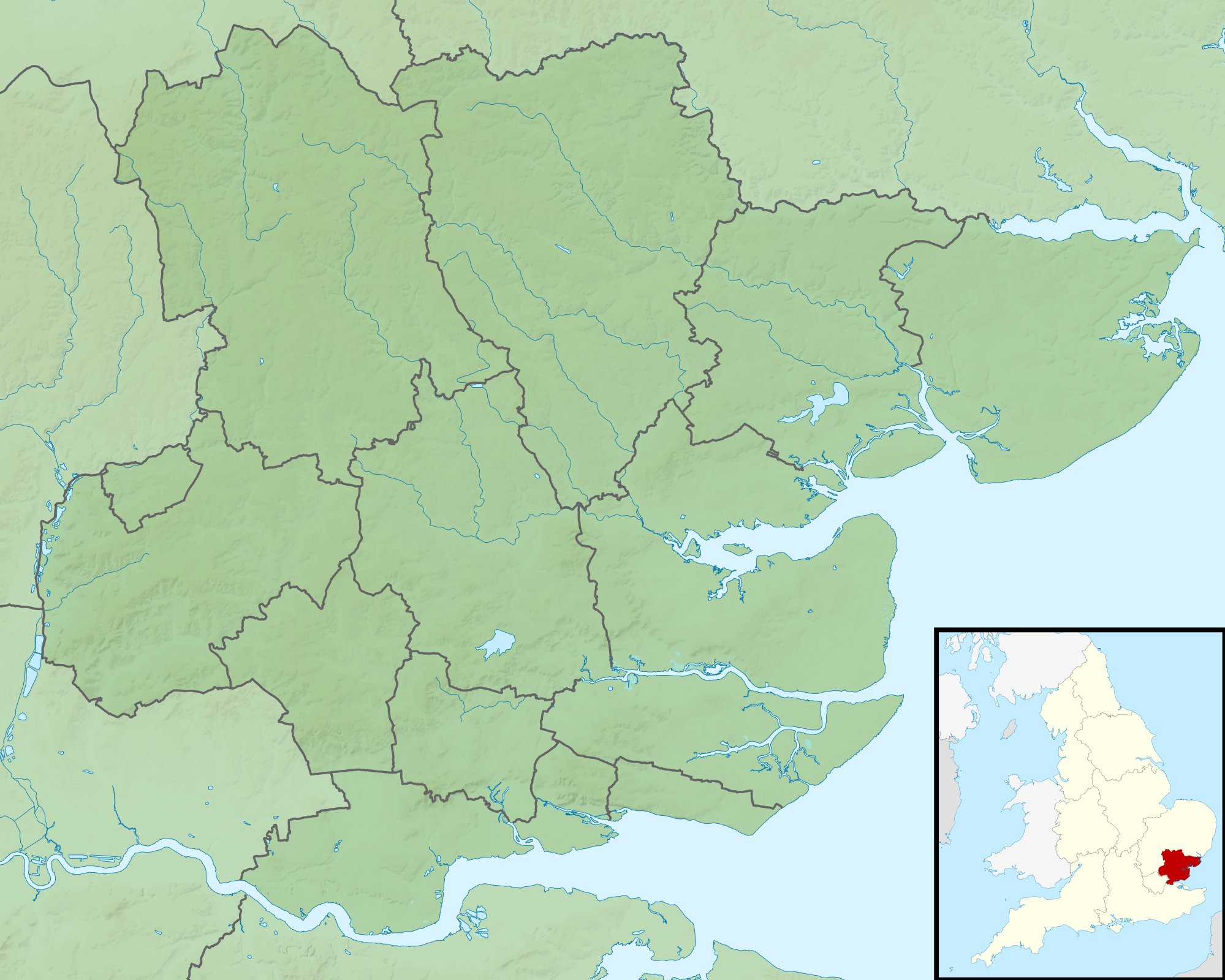
- Location within England Location within Essex
- Coordinates: 51°49.2′N 00°51.6′E
- Lake type: Reservoir
- Primary inflows: Pumped from River Stour and River Great Ouse
- Managing agency: Essex and Suffolk Water
- First flooded: 1939
- Surface area: 700 ha (1,700 acres)
- Max. depth: 17 m (56 ft)
- Water volume: 41,000 megalitres (9.0×10^{9} imp gal)

Ramsar Wetland
- Designated: 24 July 1981
- Reference no.: 220

Abberton Reservoir is a pumped storage freshwater reservoir in eastern England near the Essex coast, with an area of 700 hectares (1,700 acres). Most of its water is pumped from the River Stour. It is the largest body of freshwater in Essex.

Constructed between 1935 and 1939, Abberton Reservoir is owned and managed by Essex and Suffolk Water, part of Northumbrian Water Group, and lies 6 km (3.7 mi) south-west of Colchester near the village of Layer de la Haye. In World War II, the reservoir was mined to deter invading seaplanes, and it was used by the RAF's No. 617 Squadron ("The Dam Busters") for practice runs for the bombing of the German dams in the Ruhr. A project to increase the capacity of Abberton Reservoir to 41,000 megalitres (9.0×10^{9} imp gal) by raising its bank height was completed in 2013, along with a new link to transfer water from Norfolk's River Ouse to the Stour.

The reservoir is important for its breeding cormorants, wintering and moulting waterfowl, and migrating birds. It is an internationally important wetland, designated as a Ramsar site, Site of Special Scientific Interest and Special Protection Area, and is listed in A Nature Conservation Review. A small part of the site is managed by the Essex Wildlife Trust.

== History ==
Essex is one of the driest counties in the UK, situated as it is the East of England region, the driest part of Britain. The first major project to address local water needs was the establishment of the South Essex Waterworks Company in 1861, which extracted water from the underlying chalk aquifer through wells and boreholes. This supplied an area north east of London from East Ham to Grays and Brentwood. Despite the tapping of new wells, by the outbreak of World War I, the demand was outstripping supply, and eventually the need to find new sources led to the creation of a new reservoir.

The South Essex Waterworks Act 1928 (18 & 19 Geo. 5. c. lxxix) gave the water company the authority to plan and oversee the construction of a new reservoir to supply the local area, and further legislation in 1935 approved the necessary infrastructure in terms of pipelines to the Stour, pumping stations and a water treatment plant. The reservoir was constructed between 1935 and 1939 on a site that was formerly farmland with a couple of small woods, by damming the Layer Brook, although most of its water is pumped in from the River Stour 14 km (8.7 mi) to the north east of the reservoir.

The 690 m (2,270 ft) dam wall was constructed using the underlying London Clay to build an impermeable puddle clay core. Layers of soil and gravel were piled on both sides of the clay core to increase the dam's strength. Existing buildings and plant life were cleared from within the reservoir basin boundaries, and the topsoil stripped and used to profile the reservoir's edges. A concrete apron and road covered 13.7 kilometres (8.5 mi) of the 17.7-kilometre (11.0 mi) perimeter. Two existing roads were kept, crossing the west end of the reservoir on causeways completed in May 1939. The reservoir originally held 25,000 megalitres (5.5×10^{9} imp gal) of water.

=== World War II ===
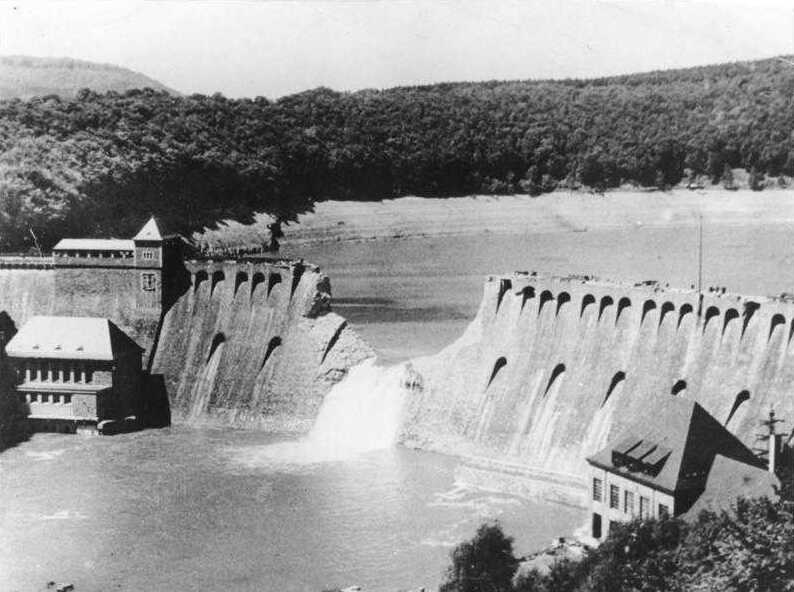
Edersee Dam on 17 May 1943

Abberton Reservoir was first filled just before the start of World War II in 1939, and the Ministry of Defence was concerned that it might be used by German seaplanes as part of a possible invasion. To prevent this, 312 naval mines, anchored by steel cables, were laid in a grid across the reservoir. Steel cables were stretched across the part of the reservoir nearest to the pumping station, since exploding mines might have damaged the building. Some were inadvertently detonated by ice, but most were exploded after the war by soldiers firing from the banks.

A German Heinkel bomber returning from a raid on Hornchurch airfield was shot down over Abberton on 24 August 1940. One of its crew bailed out from the burning plane and was captured; another drowned.

The reservoir was used by the RAF's No. 617 Squadron ("The Dam Busters") for practice runs for attacks against German dams in the Ruhr during World War II (Operation Chastise). The reservoir was intended to simulate the Edersee Dam in Germany. Lancaster bombers fitted with special bouncing bombs designed by Barnes Wallis were used in these trials, and military police closed the causeway whilst the practice runs took place. The last practice flight to Abberton was a full dress rehearsal of the Ruhr attack, and took place on the night of 14 May 1943. The actual attack on the dams in Germany took place two nights later on 16 May 1943. The Edersee Dam was attacked and breached after the Möhne dam had been successfully destroyed.

In 2025, a blue plaque was installed at the reservoir commemorating Abberton Reservoir's involvement in the Dam Busters' preparations.

=== Expansion ===
The reservoir's current owners, Essex and Suffolk Water, part of the Northumbrian Water Group, recognised by 2007 that its capacity was insufficient to meet growing local demand, and initiated a £140 million project to increase the capacity to 41,000 megalitres (9.0×10^{9} imp gal) by raising its banks. The scheme was completed in 2013, and included replacing the existing link from the Stour to Abberton with new, higher capacity, pipes following a different route and extracting water at Wormingford instead of Stratford St. Mary.

The other major part of the project was to enable the transfer of water from the Ouse, 141 km (88 mi) distant in Norfolk, to the reservoir via the Stour. Existing pipelines and associated infrastructure such as pumping stations carried water from the Ouse at Denver to Kirtling Green. From there, a new 15.5-kilometre (9.6 mi) tunnel was constructed to Wixoe, where existing pipelines completed the transfer to the Stour.

The reservoir has a current maximum area of 535 ha (1,320 acres), and has three sections separated by the Layer Breton and Layer de la Haye causeways. The easternmost large, deep Main section, originally 410 hectares (1,000 acres) was enlarged to its current 535 ha (1,320 acres) in 2013, the Central section covers 49 ha (120 acres), and the Western section is 16 ha (40 acres). The current maximum water depth is about 17 m (56 ft), 3.2 m (10 ft) more than before the enlargement.

In wet years, Abberton and the other major Essex reservoir at Hanningfield can meet the requirements of the 750,000 people they serve in Essex and north east London using only water from the Stour and other local sources, but in average years 7% of the inflow involves transfers from the Ouse, rising to 35% in times of drought.

== Ecology ==
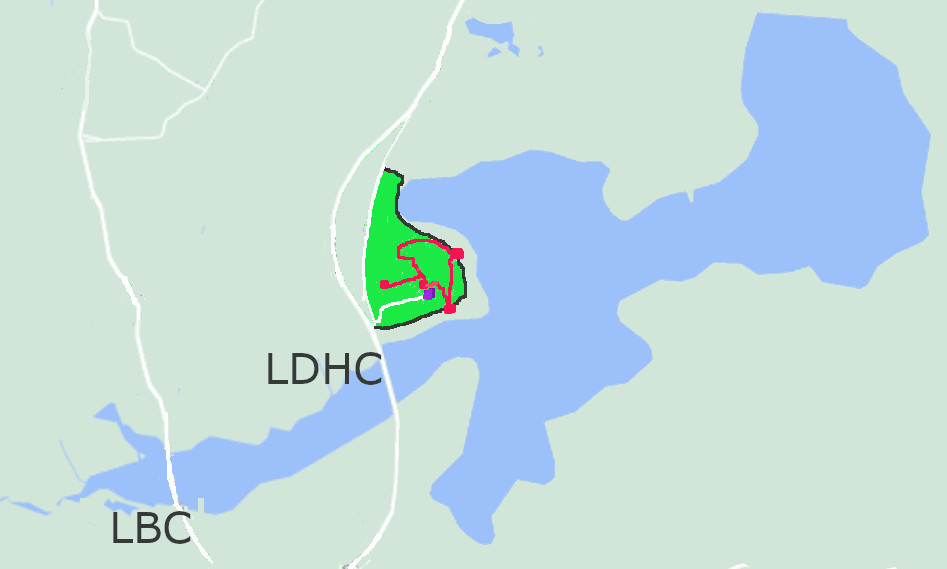
LBC Layer Breton Causeway LDHC Layer de la Haye Causeway Nature reserve Paths and bird hides Visitor Centre

Abberton Reservoir, the largest body of freshwater in Essex, lies 6 km (3.7 mi) south-west of Colchester near the village of Layer de la Haye and less than 8 km (5.0 mi) from the coast. The Western and Central sections of Abberton Reservoir have natural shores with common reed and willow close to the water, grading into damp grassland and cultivated fields. The Main part originally had concrete borders, but 12 kilometres (7.5 mi) of this apron and the perimeter road were broken up in the expansion between 2010 and 2013. Most of the edge was re-profiled to make it more attractive to water birds, and along with 200 hectares (490 acres) of adjacent land, it is now managed by Essex and Suffolk Water and the Essex Wildlife Trust to increase biodiversity.

The new design created pools around the borders of the reservoir and allowed for creation of marshland west of the Layer de la Haye causeway. A culvert under the causeway was blocked, allowing the water level in the western sections to be controlled independently of the main body of water.

=== Birds ===
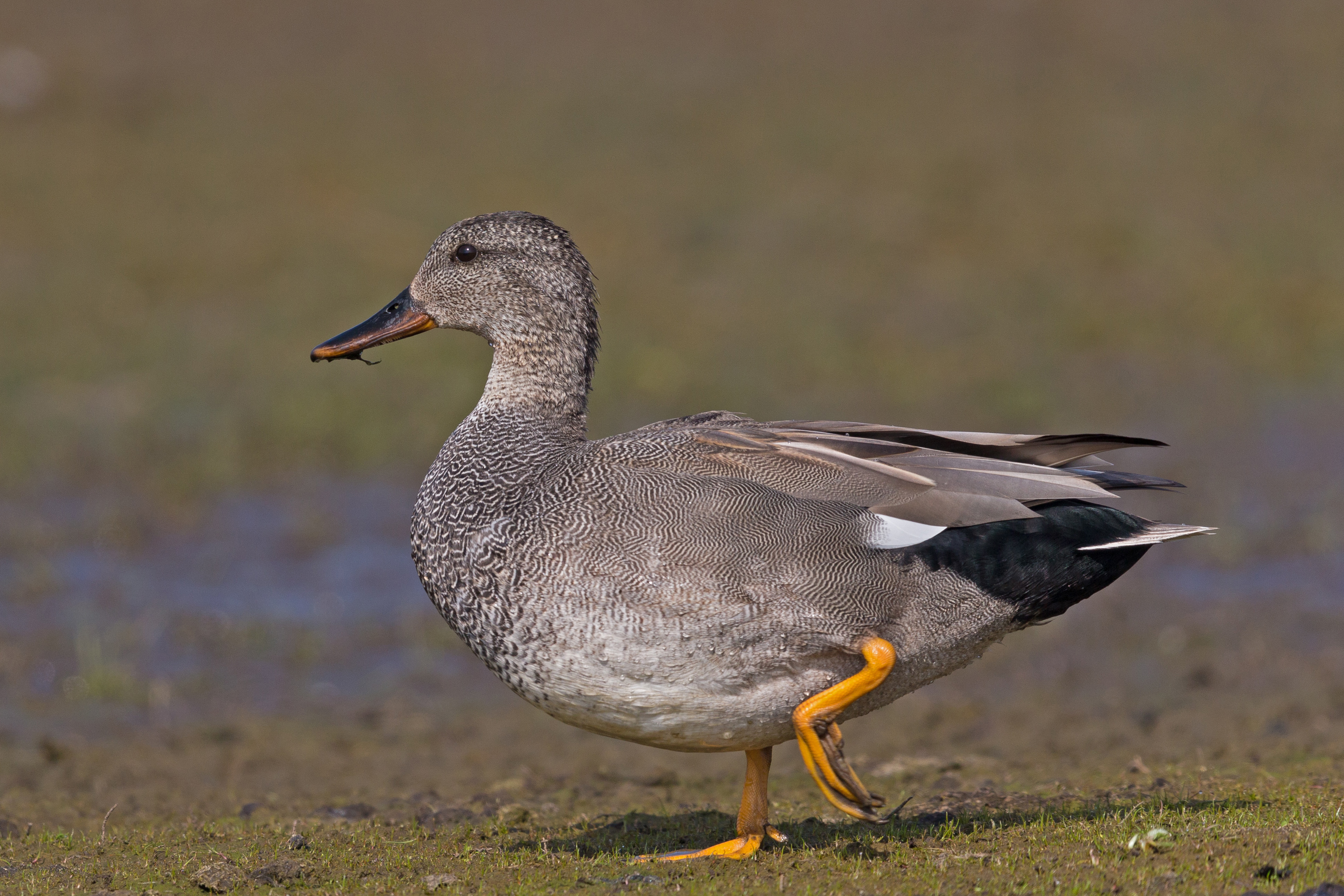
Abberton is internationally important for gadwalls (male shown)

Abberton had been a winter roosting site for cormorants from the 1950s, and became the first tree-nesting colony in England when eight pairs bred there in 1981. There were 584 pairs by 1993, although numbers have since declined to around 180 pairs. Little egrets first nested in 2014, numbering 31 pairs by 2019, and a pair of cattle egrets bred in 2020. The area holds around 20 pairs each of Cetti's warblers and nightingales. Typical farmland species such as the corn bunting, yellowhammer and barn owl also breed in the protected areas. Up to eight pairs of little ringed plovers breed on the re-profiled margins of the reservoir.

Abberton is a major site for wintering wildfowl, and has the largest numbers of any UK inland water body, typically holding around 35,000 individual birds, but rising to well over 40,000 in hard winters. It is of international importance for wintering gadwalls, shovelers and wigeons, and of national importance for mute swans, teal, pochards, tufted ducks, goldeneyes, coots and great crested grebes. Many ducks also moult during their stay at the reservoir. There are significant numbers of waders in winter, including black-tailed godwits, ruffs, lapwings and golden plovers. In winter, bitterns occur regularly at the western end of the reservoir, and hen harriers, merlins, peregrine falcons and marsh harriers hunt over the bordering grassland; the last species has sometimes summered.

Its proximity to the coast means that Abberton may hold scarcer species like smews and long-tailed ducks, and rarities including a blue-winged teal (1996), Britain's first canvasback (1997–2001) and a lesser scaup (2004–2005). Rare terns include gull-billed, which bred in 1949 and 1950, Caspian, whiskered and white-winged black, five of the last species being present together in May 2019. Other recent rarities include ortolan bunting (2019), Bonaparte's gull (2017, 2019) Franklin's gull (2016) and desert wheatear (2012). There have been multiple records of red-footed falcons and red-rumped swallows over the years.

A bird ringing scheme has operated at Abberton for more than 70 years, 90,000 ducks having been ringed in that period, including 40,000 teal. Recoveries of ringed birds have established national longevity records for 10 species, including wigeon (34 years), pochard (22 years) and gadwall (21 years).

=== Other wildlife ===
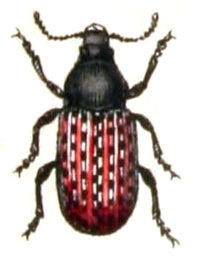
Anthribus fasciatus

Abberton has otters, water voles and brown hares, and eight species of bats, and other vertebrates include the common lizard, grass snake and great crested newt. Insects present include two rare weevils, Rhynchites auratus, which feeds on blackthorn, and a fungus specialist, Anthribus fasciatus.

Introduced American signal crayfish are a problem in that they are larger and more prolific breeders than the native white-clawed crayfish, and eventually displace the latter species. They also burrow into river banks, which at Abberton may reduce the area available for aquatic vegetation and increase the amount of sediment entering the reservoir from the Layer Brook.

=== Protection ===
Abberton was designated a Special Protection Area on 5 December 1991 as a result of its over-wintering populations of golden plovers, gadwalls, shovelers and teals, and for its breeding population of cormorants. There are also significant numbers of black-tailed godwits, lapwings, coots, goldeneyes, tufted ducks, pochards, pintails, wigeons and great crested grebes.

It is an internationally important wetland that was designated as a Ramsar site in 1981, and became a Site of Special Scientific Interest in 1988, three years after Hanningfield Reservoir received the same status.

A small part of the site is managed as a nature reserve by the Essex Wildlife Trust.

== Access ==
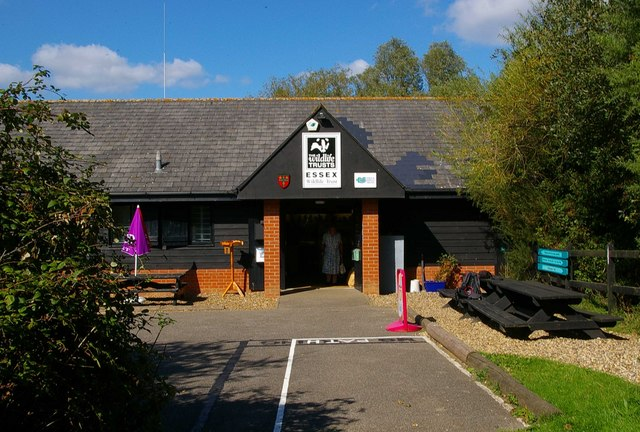
Abberton Visitor Centre

The Essex Wildlife Trust has a car park and nature reserve, the Abberton Reservoir Nature Discovery Park, at the north end of the Layer de la Haye causeway. There is a visitor centre with a shop, café, toilets and play area, and three bird hides, two looking south and east over the Main section, and one in woodland. The visitor centre and reserve are open every day from 10 am–5 pm as of 2021.

The western and central sections can be viewed from the Layer Breton and Layer de la Haye causeways, the latter also giving views of the main section. There is no public access to the western section, but a car park at the southern end of the Layer de la Haye causeway gives access to a viewing screen and scrapes (vegetation-free areas of mud) for waders on the main section. Parts of the rest of the main section can be seen from public footpaths and St Andrews Church in Abberton village.

== Cited works ==
- "Abberton Reservoir expansion project – the story so far" (PDF). Essex and Suffolk Water. Archived from the original (PDF) on 5 March 2016.
