= Stock, Essex =

Village in Essex, England

Coordinates: 51.6626°N 0.4440°E

Stock
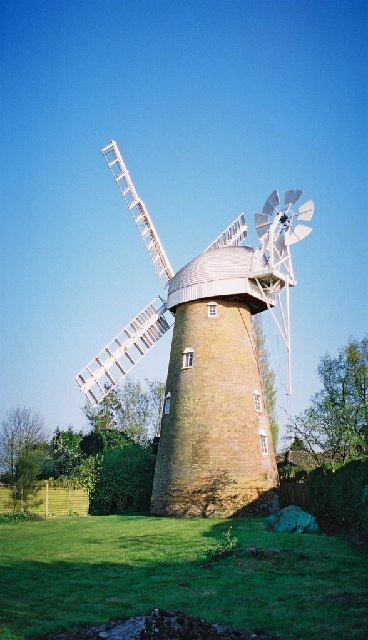
- Stock Windmill

- Location within Essex
- Population: 2,156 (Parish, 2021) (Note: To get individual parish data, use the query function on table PP002.)
- OS grid reference: TQ6998
- District: Chelmsford
- Shire county: Essex
- Region: East
- Country: England
- Sovereign state: United Kingdom
- Post town: INGATESTONE
- Postcode district: CM4
- Dialling code: 01277
- Police: Essex
- Fire: Essex
- Ambulance: East of England
- UK Parliament: Maldon

Stock is a village and civil parish in the City of Chelmsford district of Essex, England. It lies about 6 miles (10 km) south of Chelmsford (the county town) and about 2.5 miles (4.0 km) north of Billericay. At the 2021 census, the parish had a population of 2,156.

== History ==
The origins of the village are uncertain and are subject to debate. Archaeological finds suggest that there was a settlement on the site during the Iron Age period. The Domesday Book of 1086, however, does not mention Stock.

The first documentary evidence of the settlement dates from the 13th century. Until the 16th century, the village was known as Hereward Stock, Stoke or variations thereof.

Stock historically formed part of the ancient parish of Buttsbury, which had its parish church of St Mary's in an isolated location at the western edge of the parish. From at least the 12th century, there was a chapel of ease dedicated to All Saints at Stock. Stock was more central to the parish and, by medieval times, had become the main village in Buttsbury parish. The chapelry of Stock subsequently became a separate parish. The area ceded to the new parish of Stock was relatively small, with north-eastern parts of the built up area of Stock around the High Street remaining in Buttsbury, forming part of a long salient which skirted around the northern edge of the village. As late as the 19th century, this area around Stock's High Street was where most of the houses in Buttsbury parish were located; the built up area was sometimes described as being Stock and Buttsbury intermingled.

The civil parish of Stock was enlarged in 1881 to take in the Crondon area north of the village, which had been a detached part of the parish of Orsett. It was further enlarged in 1936 when the parish of Buttsbury was abolished, thereby gaining the remaining parts of Stock village and the rural area to the west around the church. In 1955, the parish also gained rural areas to the east of the village from South Hanningfield and West Hanningfield.

== Governance ==
In the UK Parliament, Stock lies in the constituency of Maldon. Since 1992, it has been represented by Sir John Whittingdale of the Conservative Party.

Stock is a part of the City of Chelmsford district and also has its own parish council.

== Amenities ==
The village has three churches: the Church of England parish church of All Saints, the Catholic Church of Our Lady and St Joseph, and Christ Church.

There are three public houses in the village: The Bear, The Hoop and The Baker's Arms. Two further pubs lie on its outskirts: The Ship, near West Hanningfield, and The King's Head near Billericay. The Harvard Inn is a hotel and restaurant, Greenwoods is a hotel and spa; there are also two general stores.

The village has a common, with a cricket pitch and a small playground. Stock Windmill is located to the east of the village.

Stock Church of England Primary School was rated as Good by Ofsted in September 2022.

== Transport ==
The B1007 runs through the centre of the village, providing a direct connection by road to Chelmsford, Billericay, Basildon and Stanford-le-Hope. It also links Stock with the A12 trunk road to the north via junction 15.

First Essex operates frequent bus services on route 300 between Chelmsford, Galleywood, Billericay and Basildon. There are also two-hourly services on route 14 between Chelmsford, West Hanningfield and Wickford.

The nearest National Rail stations are at Ingatestone, on the Great Eastern Main Line, and Billericay, on the Shenfield-Southend line; Greater Anglia provides services from both stations to London Liverpool Street.

== Notable residents ==
The poet William Cowper (pronounced Cooper) was a friend of Willam Unwin, who was the rector from 1769 to 1787. The Cowper poem that is most closely connected with Stock is Tithing Time at Stock or the Yearly Distress.

Admiral Sir Vernon Haggard lived in the village.
