= Downham, Essex =

Village in Essex, England

Coordinates: 51°38′22″N 0°29′24″E

Downham
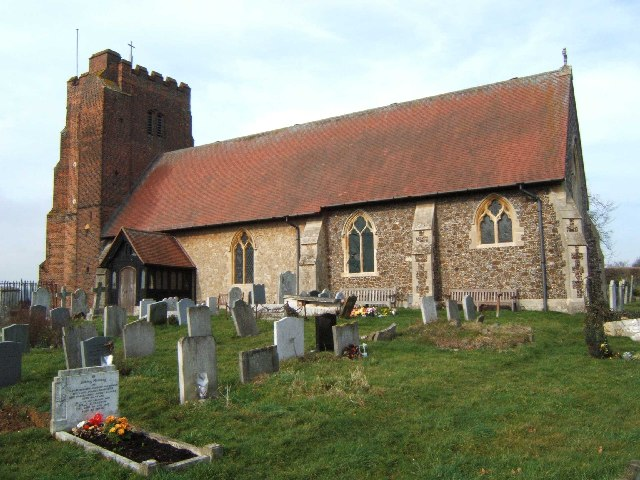
- St Margaret's Church

- Location within Essex
- Area: 3.36 sq mi (8.7 km^{2})
- OS grid reference: TQ728960
- Civil parish: South Hanningfield
- District: Chelmsford
- Shire county: Essex
- Region: East
- Country: England
- Sovereign state: United Kingdom
- Post town: BILLERICAY
- Postcode district: CM11 1
- Dialling code: 01268
- Police: Essex
- Fire: Essex
- Ambulance: East of England
- UK Parliament: Rayleigh

Downham is a small village in the civil parish of South Hanningfield, in the Chelmsford district of Essex, England. It is located approximately 7 miles (11 km) south of the county town of Chelmsford. The nearest towns are Billericay, 3 1/2 miles (5.6 km) west-south-west, and Wickford, 2 1/4 miles (3.6 km) south-east.

== History ==
There is evidence of Roman remains in the village suggesting it was originally of pre-Saxon origin, though it is not in the Domesday Book of 1086. The hilltop parish church is dedicated to St Margaret. The oldest section of the church is a 10 1/2 ft by 11 ft square redbrick tower from the late 15th or early 16th century. However, Christians have been recorded as worshipping on the site for over one thousand years. The nave of the church was restored in the nineteenth century, using some material from an earlier 13th-century building, and the interior was refurbished in the 1970s after a fire in March 1977. An ancient Field Maple lies north of the church. The village is home to Downham Hall, which was once the home of the De Beauvoir family; the building which currently stands is smaller than the original 17th-century mansion.

Downham was an ancient parish in the Barstable Hundred of Essex. When elected parish and district councils were established in 1894 the parish was included in the Billericay Rural District. In 1934 the parish and rural district were both abolished. The northern part of Downham parish, including the village, was absorbed into the parish of South Hanningfield. The southern part of the parish, which included the edges of Wickford, was transferred to the Billericay Urban District. At the 1931 census (the last before the abolition of the civil parish), Downham had a population of 833.

== Geography ==
Downham has approximately 200 households. The village has an elevation of 188 feet (57 m) above sea level, and the parish had an area of 2,152 acres (3.36 sq mi). The village is close to Hanningfield Reservoir, with its southwest bank being half a mile north from the village centre.

== See also ==
- Ramsden Heath
