= Ramsden Heath =

Village in Essex, England

Coordinates: 51.6370°N 0.4718°E

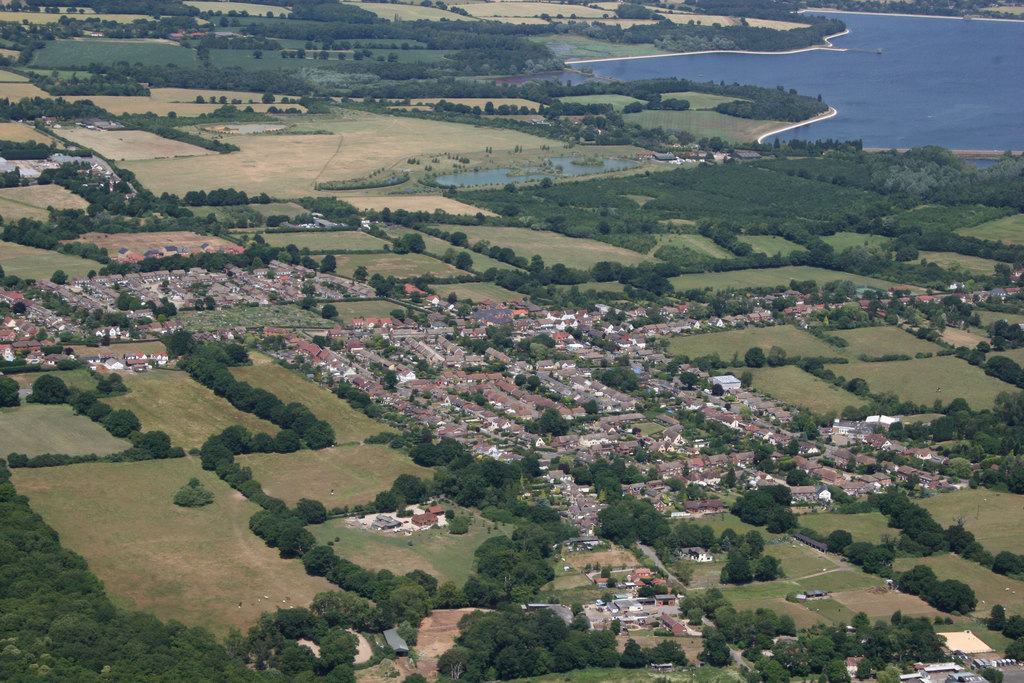
- Aerial photograph of the village and Hanningfield Reservoir, 2010

- Location within Essex
- Area: 0.818 km^{2} (0.316 sq mi)
- Population: 1,966 (2018 estimate)
  - Density: 2,403/km^{2} (6,220/sq mi)
- OS grid reference: TQ714960
- Civil parish: South Hanningfield
- District: Chelmsford
- Shire county: Essex
- Region: East
- Country: England
- Sovereign state: United Kingdom
- Post town: BILLERICAY
- Postcode district: CM11
- Dialling code: 01268
- Police: Essex
- Fire: Essex
- Ambulance: East of England
- UK Parliament: Maldon

Ramsden Heath is a village in Essex in the east of England. It is located approximately 8 mi (13 km) south of the county town of Chelmsford; the closest towns are Billericay, approximately 3 mi (4.8 km) west-south-west, and Wickford, approximately 3.5 mi (5.6 km) south-east. The village is close to Hanningfield Reservoir and the smaller village of Downham lies immediately to the east.

In 2018, Ramsden Heath had an estimated population of 1,966 and has approximately 600 households. The parish council is South Hanningfield, the local authority is the City of Chelmsford and it is sited within the parliamentary constituency of Maldon.

== Amenities ==
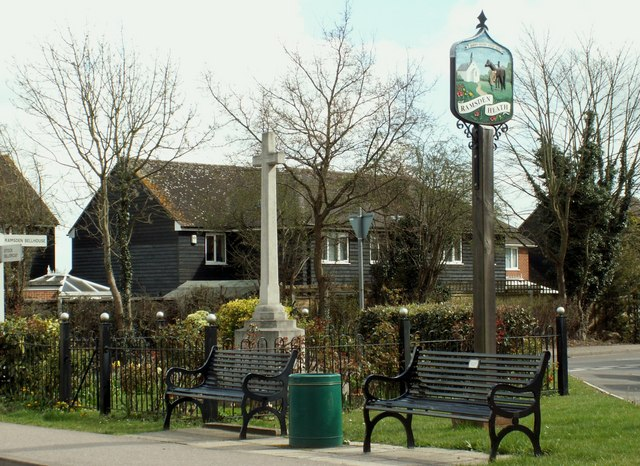
The village sign and war memorial

There are three pubs in the village: the White Horse, the Nags Head and the Fox & Hounds. Other amenities include a cafe, hairdresser and tennis club.

The local primary school is called Downham Church of England (Voluntary Controlled) Primary School because it was once located within Downham and not Ramsden Heath.

There is also a free church and an air-conditioned village hall available for hire; it consists of a small hall, a large hall and kitchen facilities.

== Transport ==
Ramsden Heath is located close to the following trunk roads:

- A12, which connects east London, the M25 motorway, Chelmsford and Lowestoft;
- A127, which links east London, the M25 and Southend-on-Sea.

There are several bus services, operated by First Essex and NIBS Buses, which link the village with Billericay, Chelmsford, the Hanningfields and Wickford.

The nearest railway stations are at Billericay and Wickford, both of which are on the Shenfield-Southend line which connects to the Great Eastern Main Line for services London Liverpool Street and East Anglia.

== See also ==
- Ramsden Bellhouse
