= Ramsden Bellhouse =

Village in Essex, England

Coordinates: 51.623°N 0.4823°E

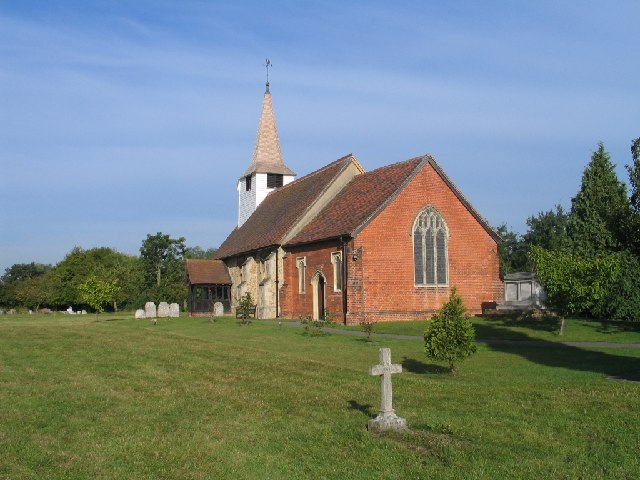
- St. Mary the Virgin, Ramsden Bellhouse

- Location within Essex
- Interactive map of Ramsden Bellhouse
- Population: 832 (Parish, 2021)
- OS grid reference: TQ721943
  - London: 27 miles (43 km) WSW
- District: Basildon
- Shire county: Essex
- Region: East
- Country: England
- Sovereign state: United Kingdom
- Post town: BILLERICAY
- Postcode district: CM11
- Dialling code: 01268
- Police: Essex
- Fire: Essex
- Ambulance: East of England
- UK Parliament: Billericay

Ramsden Bellhouse is a village and civil parish in the Basildon borough of Essex, England. It lies 3 miles (5 km) east of Billericay, its post town, and 2 miles (3 km) west of the centre of Wickford. At the 2021 census the parish had a population of 832.

The River Crouch flows through Ramsden Bellhouse, flowing under Church Road.

== History ==
The meaning of the name Ramsden is uncertain. The "-den" means a valley, but there are a variety of theories as to the meaning of the first element. Suggestions include a person's name, wild garlic (also known as ramsons), ravens, and rams. The Bellhouse comes from the name of the family who owned the manor in the 13th century.

The Domesday Book of 1086 records seven estates or manors in the vill of Ramsden, listed as Ramesdana or Ramesduna, in the Barstable Hundred of Essex.

The Ramsden area came to form the two parishes of Ramsden Bellhouse and Ramsden Crays. In the 12th century, Roger fitzReinfrid, a royal justice, held land at Ramsden Bellhouse. He granted the church at Ramsden Bellhouse to Lesnes Abbey in north Kent. The church was subsequently rebuilt; the oldest parts of the current church, dedicated to St Mary, date from the 14th century.

== Governance ==
There are three tiers of local government covering Ramsden Bellhouse, at parish, district, and county level: Ramsden Bellhouse Parish Council, Basildon Borough Council, and Essex County Council. The parish council meets at the village hall on Church Road.

When elected parish and district councils were established in 1894, the parish of Ramsden Bellhouse was included in the Billericay Rural District. The civil parish of Ramsden Bellhouse was abolished in 1934, when its area was split along the line of the railway. The part of the parish north of the railway, which included the village of Ramsden Heath, was transferred to the parish of South Hanningfield. The part of the parish south of the railway, which included the village of Ramsden Bellhouse itself, was added to the parish of Great Burstead in the new Billericay Urban District. The parish of Great Burstead was abolished three years later in 1937 when all the parishes in the urban district were merged into a single parish called Billericay. The urban district was renamed Basildon in 1955 and was reformed to become the modern Basildon district in 1974, at which point the district also became an unparished area.

The modern parish of Ramsden Bellhouse was created in 1996 from part of the unparished area. It covers a smaller area than the pre-1934 parish, with Ramsden Heath north of the railway remaining part of the parish of South Hanningfield.

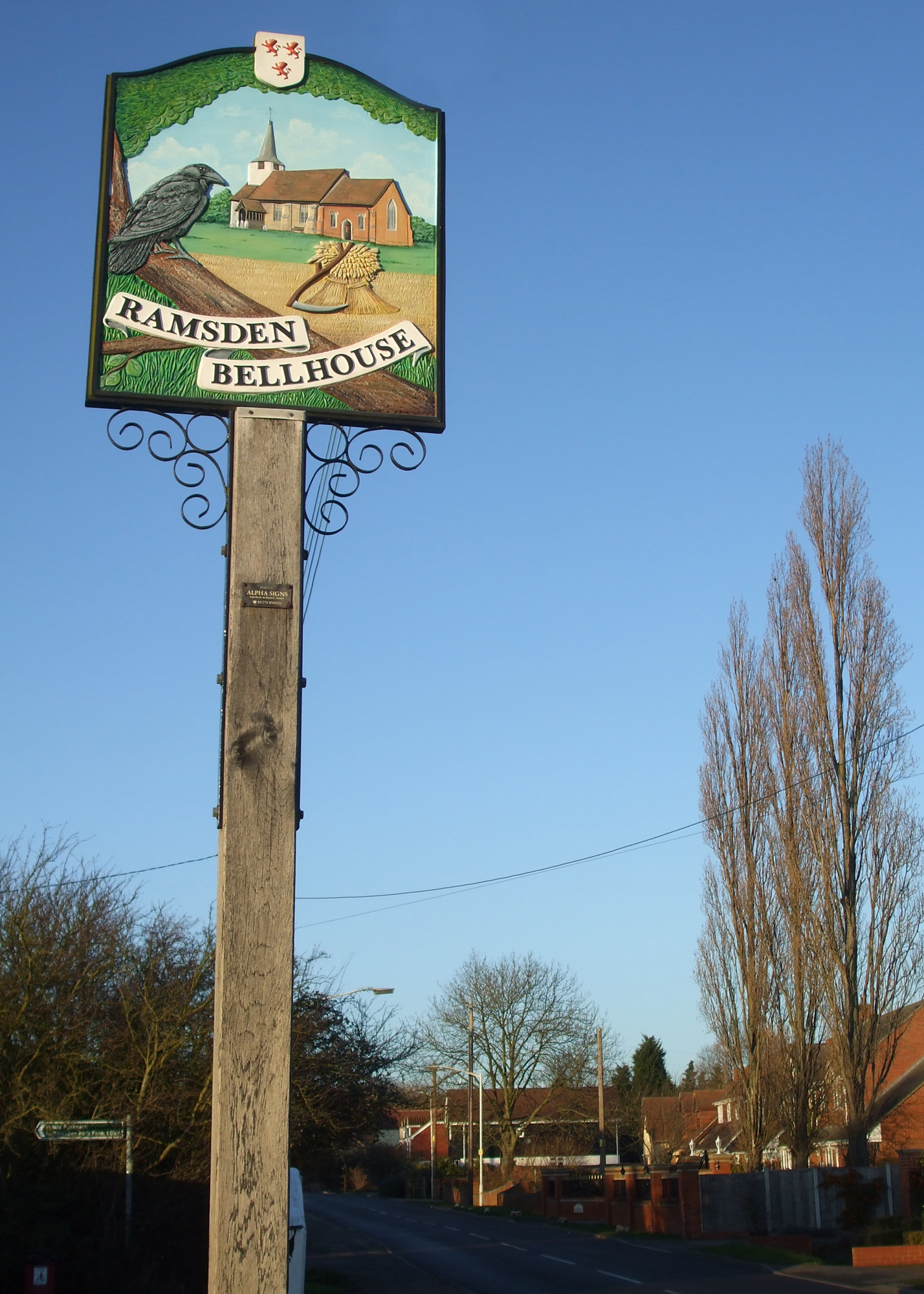
Village sign

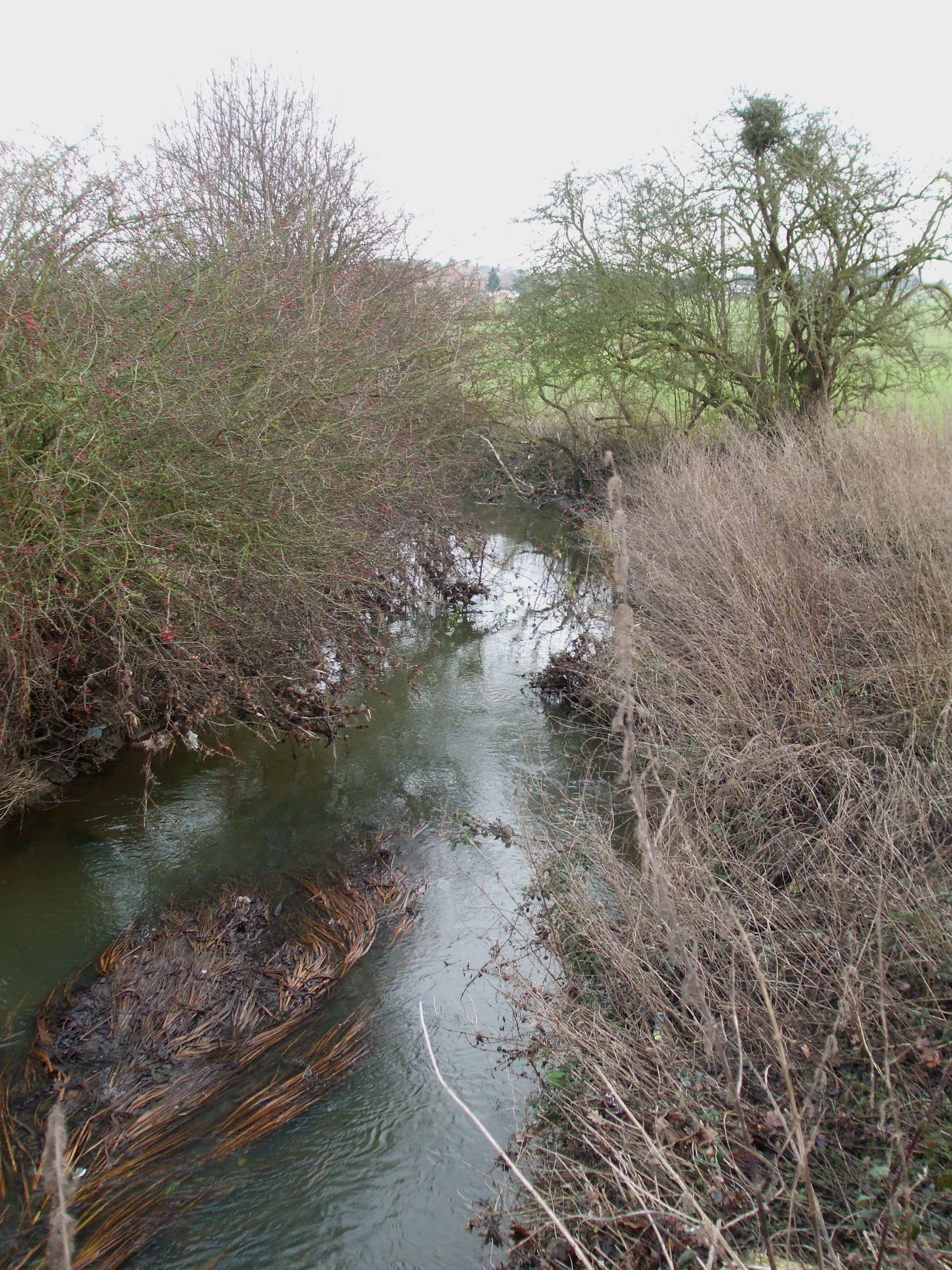
River Crouch passing under Church Road.
