= Buttsbury =

Settlement in Essex, England

Coordinates: 51°39′41″N 0°24′16″E

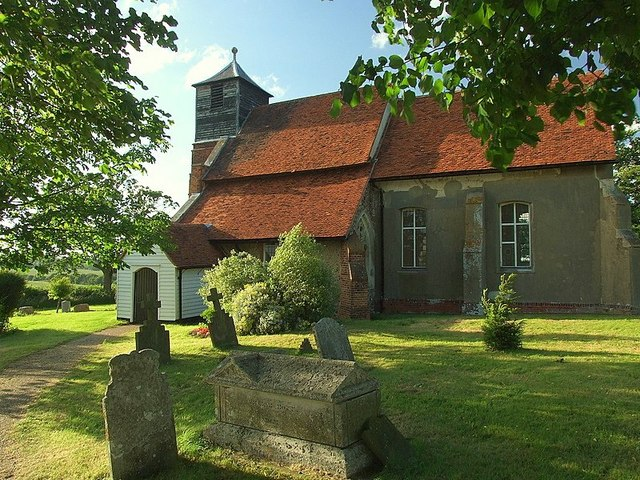
- St Mary's Church

- Location within Essex
- OS grid reference: TQ6698
- Civil parish: Stock
- District: Chelmsford
- Shire county: Essex
- Region: East
- Country: England
- Sovereign state: United Kingdom
- Post town: BILLERICAY
- Postcode district: CM12
- Post town: Ingatestone
- Postcode district: CM4
- Police: Essex
- Fire: Essex
- Ambulance: East of England

Buttsbury is a settlement in the civil parish of Stock, in the Chelmsford district of Essex, England. Buttsbury was anciently an extensive parish, which included both Stock and areas that now form northern suburbs of Billericay. The parish church of St Mary appears to have Saxon origins. It stands in an isolated position on a hill near the River Wid, and is surrounded by fields.

The main village in the ancient parish was Stock, which had its own chapel of ease from at least the 12th century and subsequently became a separate parish. The reduced parish of Buttsbury thereafter covered the rural fringes to the north, west, and south of its former main settlement of Stock. There is no village of Buttsbury as such today, with just a handful of isolated houses in the lanes near the church having Buttsbury addresses. The civil parish was abolished in 1936, being split between Stock and Billericay. An ecclesiastical parish of Buttsbury continues to exist, covering a smaller area than the ancient parish.

== Toponymy ==
The name Buttsbury comes from Old English and means Botolph's pear tree. Whilst place names ending in -bury typically come from burh meaning a fortified place, early forms of the name here show that in this case it came from perry meaning pear trees. Eilert Ekwall records spellings of Buttsbury in 1220 as Botolfvespirie and in 1230 as Botoluespirie, indicating a root in pyrige for pear tree.

Some writers have speculated that the Botolph in question may have been Botolph of Thorney, a 7th-century saint, suggesting that he may have preached beside a certain pear tree. Alternatively, the name may come from a pear orchard belonging to someone called Botolph; in the southern part of the former parish was an area called Perry Street (now in Billericay).

== History ==
In the Domesday Book of 1086 there was a manor listed called Cinga, owned by Henry de Ferrers. Cinga or Ginge was an old name for Buttsbury. Ekwall identifies feet of fines entries for Ginges Joiberd in 1231 and Ginges Laundri in 1236 as referring to Buttsbury.

Wynford Grant identified Ynge Gyngiang Jayber and Ing Ging Jayberd Laundrey as former names of Great and Little Blunts. Blunts was a manor in the south of Buttsbury parish. Charles Phillips states that Tobert de Blund lost possession of the manor of Blunts for supporting Simon de Montfort's rebellion against Henry III in the 1260s, but that Thomas le Blonte of the same family held it during the reign of Richard II.

St Mary's Church at Buttsbury appears to have Saxon origins, although much of the building's visible fabric dates from the 14th century and subsequent restorations. Despite being a small church in a relatively isolated location, it served an extensive parish. The church was owned by St Leonard's Priory at Bromley-by-Bow from 1190.

In 1295, Buttsbury was recorded as having a watermill called Wluesdon on the River Wid. There was also a bridge over the river at Buttsbury called Wolvesdonebrigge. At a court case heard in Chelmsford in 1351, Sir Robert Bacon was prosecuted to make repairs to the bridge, which he was said to be liable for by virtue of owning certain land in Buttsbury. Wolvesdonebrigge was replaced by a later bridge sometimes known as Buttesbury Bridge further downstream, which was built c. 1600 and is today crossed by the Stock to Ingatestone road. Further upstream (to the south) is a ford known as Buttsbury Wash on the lane from Buttsbury church towards Mountnessing.

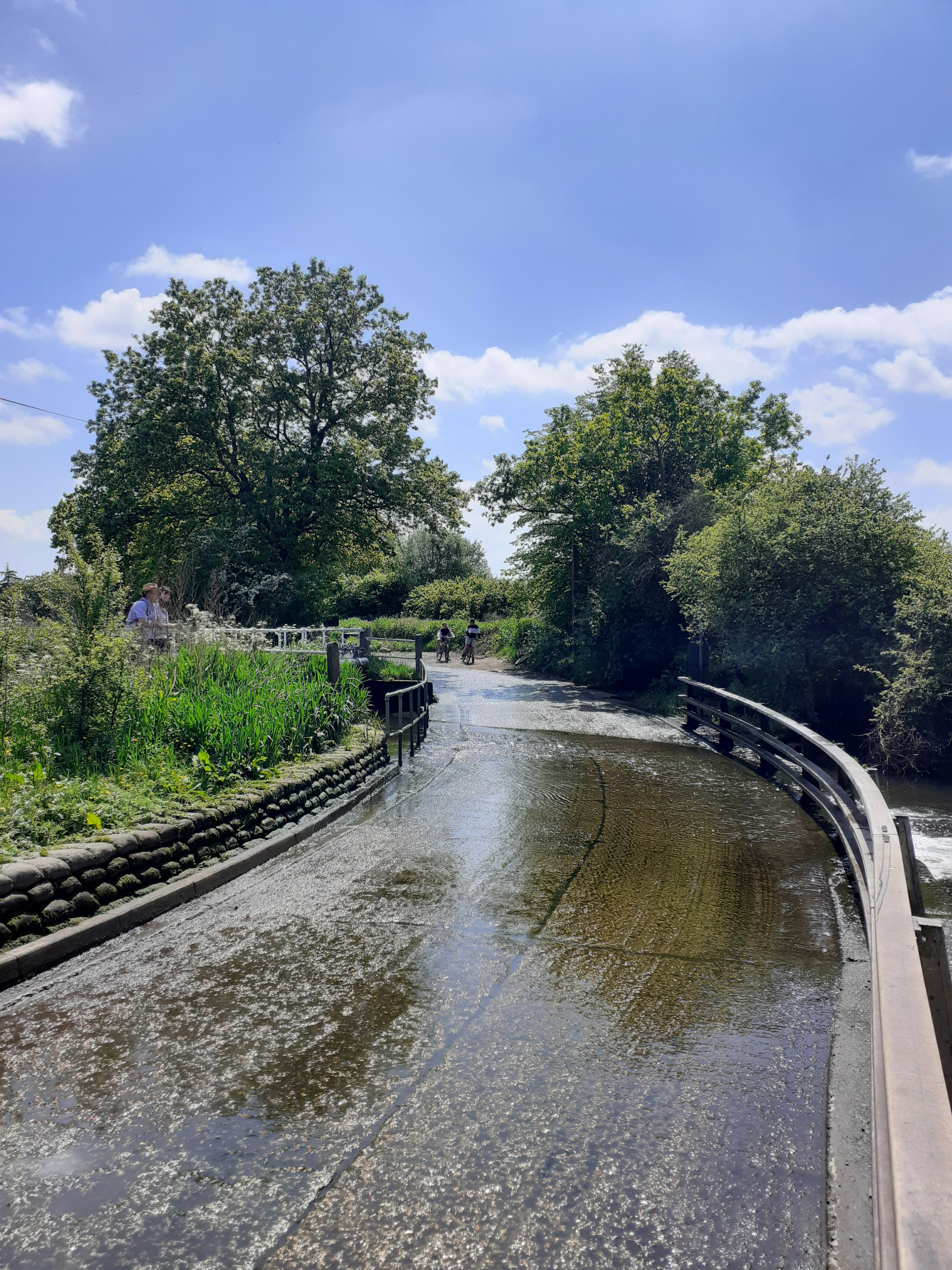
Buttsbury Wash

From at least the 12th century there was a chapel of ease dedicated to All Saints at Stock. Stock was more central to the parish and by medieval times had become the main village in the parish. Stock subsequently became a separate parish. The area ceded to the new parish of Stock was relatively small, with north-eastern parts of the built up area of Stock around the High Street remaining in Buttsbury parish, forming part of a long salient of Buttsbury parish which skirted around the northern edge of Stock. As late as the 19th century, this area around Stock's High Street was where most of the houses in Buttsbury parish were located.

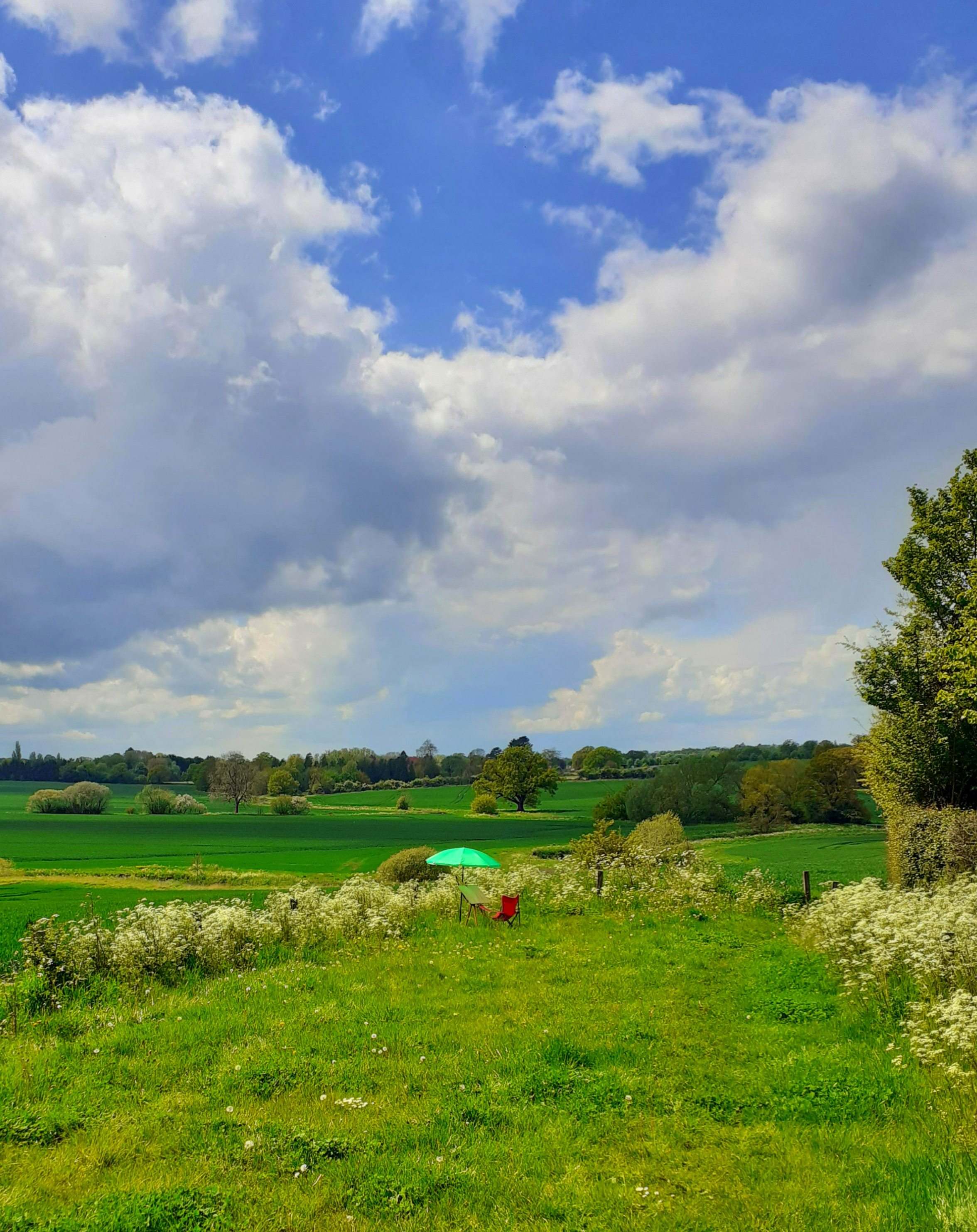
Farmland at Buttsbury, looking towards Ingatestone Hall from St Mary's Church, in 2021

Some writers have suggested that there may have anciently been a village of Buttsbury near St Mary's Church which was later deserted, perhaps as a result of the Black Death in the 14th century. Alternatively, the church may have always been isolated from the main settlements in the parish it served.

The civil parish of Buttsbury was abolished in 1936. The northern part, including the area around St Mary's Church and the part that was intermingled with Stock village, was added to the parish of Stock. The southern part around Perry Street and the farms of Great Blunts and Little Blunts was added to the parish of Billericay. At the 1931 census (the last before the abolition of the civil parish), Buttsbury had a population of 1,709.

The area that was added to Billericay has now largely been developed with suburbs of the town. Buttsbury Primary School is in the area that was added to Billericay in 1936.

Whilst the civil parish of Buttsbury was abolished in 1936, the ecclesiastical parish of Buttsbury still exists, but now just covers the rural area around St Mary's Church. The ecclesiastical parish of Buttsbury now forms part of a united benefice with neighbouring Margaretting and Mountnessing.

== Population ==
In the early 1870s, Buttsbury parish had 531 residents divided across 109 houses. Between 1911 and 1921, the population rose from 697 to 863, notwithstanding World War I in that period. In the following ten years, it rose to 1,709.

Year	Houses
1831	106
1841	123
1851	121
1881	119
1891	123
1901	136
1921	201
1931	467
