= East Hanningfield =

Village in Essex, England

Coordinates: 51.6835°N 0.5623°E

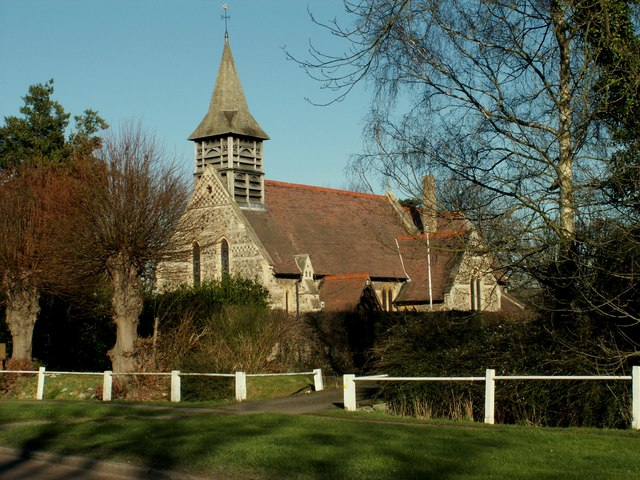
- All Saints church, East Hanningfield

- Location within Essex
- Population: 1,126 (Parish, 2021)
- OS grid reference: TL772014
- District: Chelmsford
- Shire county: Essex
- Region: East
- Country: England
- Sovereign state: United Kingdom
- Post town: CHELMSFORD
- Postcode district: CM3
- Dialling code: 01245
- Police: Essex
- Fire: Essex
- Ambulance: East of England
- UK Parliament: Maldon
- Website: East Hanningfield Parish Council

East Hanningfield is a village and civil parish in the Chelmsford district of Essex, England. It is situated to the south-east of Chelmsford and to the north-west of South Woodham Ferrers. It is surrounded by the villages of Butts Green, Bicknacre, Woodham Ferrers, West Hanningfield, Howe Green, and Rettendon. At the 2021 census the parish had a population of 1,126.

The village contains All Saints' Church (C of E), a primary school, 'The Folly Bistro'Restaurant (situated in the Former Windmill Tavern Public House and dating from the late 17th century), 'Vita Bella' Italian restaurant (situated in the former 'The Three Horseshoes' public house), a new village hall and a post office.

RHS Garden, Hyde Hall is situated near by.

== Origins ==
The earliest appearance of the name Hanningfield was in the Domesday Book of 1086, where it was spelt Haningefelda and Haneghefelda and it is thought to date from the Anglo-Saxons colonisation period between the 5th-7th centuries, and to mean the open country (feld), of the people (inga), of Hana or Han.

In 1870–72, John Marius Wilson's Imperial Gazetteer of England and Wales described East Hanningfield as:

HANNINGFIELD (EAST), a parish in Chelmsford district, Essex; 3½ miles N of the river Crouch, and 6 SE of Chelmsford r. station. Post town, Chelmsford. Acres, 2, 446. Real property, £3, 323. Pop., 453. Houses, 94. The property is subdivided. The manor belongs to Lord Petre. The living is a rectory in the diocese of Rochester. Value, £417.* Patron, Nottidge, Esq. The church is later English; and consists of nave, chancel, and north chapel, with a steeple. Charities, £13.

== All Saints' Church ==
The current church, consecrated by the Bishop of St Albans in June 1885, is not the first to be built in East Hanningfield.

In the 7th century, the local Saxon chief was converted to Christianity and built a church near where he lived at East Hanningfield Hall. This was the first All Saints' Church and it stood for over 1000 years until there was a fire in 1883. The fire engine was summoned from Chelmsford by a messenger on horseback, but sadly, by the time it arrived the church had burnt down. The heat of the fire was so great that the bells melted and fell as a shower of molten metal in the west end of the church. This metal was later salvaged by the local schoolchildren and used to make bells for the new church, recast by Mears and Stainbank of the Whitechapel Bell Foundry. The insurance from the fire (£1000) was not enough to cover the rebuilding costs, and the villagers of East Hanningfield raised the rest of the money, a further £2500, themselves. The site for the new church in the centre of the village was donated by Elijah Slater, a retired wool merchant.

In 2012 the building was Grade II listed.

You are still able to walk around the graveyard of the first All Saints' Church, situated in a small wood next to East Hanningfield Hall.

== Other Points of Incident ==
On the whole, life in East Hanningfield has been fairly quiet through the centuries with a few unhappy exceptions. Two residents were hanged for their part in the Peasants' Revolt of 1381. There was a riot about hay in 1571, and accusations of witchcraft in 1590 and 1608. On 5 October 1886 a man was killed and a number injured on Little Clayden’s farm when the Portable steam engine he was working with exploded.

== See also ==
- Hanningfield reservoir
- South Hanningfield
- West Hanningfield
- Lord Hanningfield
