= West Hanningfield =

Village in Essex, England

Coordinates: 51°40′11″N 0°30′08″E

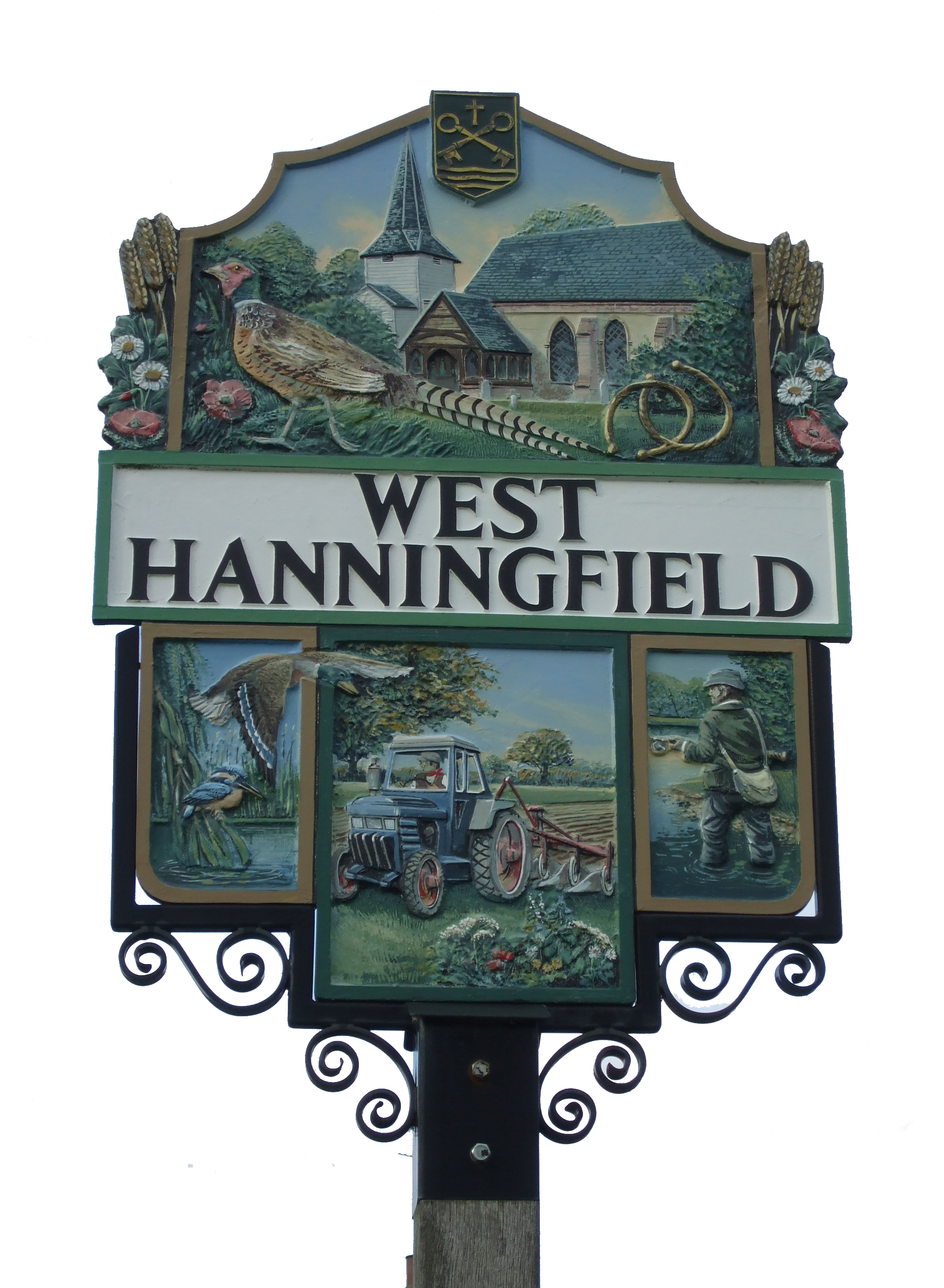
- Village sign

- Location within Essex
- Population: 1,495 (Parish, 2021)
- OS grid reference: TQ727997
- Civil parish: West Hanningfield
- District: Chelmsford
- Shire county: Essex
- Region: East
- Country: England
- Sovereign state: United Kingdom
- Post town: CHELMSFORD
- Postcode district: CM2
- Dialling code: 01277 (and 01245)
- Police: Essex
- Fire: Essex
- Ambulance: East of England
- UK Parliament: Maldon

West Hanningfield is a village and civil parish in the Chelmsford district of Essex, England. It is located approximately 5 mi (8.0 km) south-south-east of the county town of Chelmsford. At the 2021 census the parish had a population of 1,495.

It is located to the north of Hanningfield Reservoir. Surrounding villages include South Hanningfield, Stock, Rettendon and East Hanningfield. It is also close to the Chelmsford suburbs of Galleywood and Great Baddow.

The local public house is known as the Three Compasses. The village also contains a primary school, a village hall and a hairdresser. It was the home of Paul White, Baron Hanningfield, the disgraced Tory peer and former Conservative leader of Essex County Council.

The Church of St Mary and St Edward is a Grade II* listed church in the east end of the village. It is of 12th-century origin, with considerable alterations made in the 18th and 19th centuries. It has a weather-boarded timber-framed tower, thought to date from the early thirteenth century, with timbers recently dated as being felled between AD 1382 and 1414. The bells were cast in 1676 and are a rare example of a complete 17th-century ring, although not operable for some time. The Church Buildings Council consider them of historic significance. A Whitechapel Bell Foundry report noted that the bellframe was cut to install the bells.
