= Essex and Suffolk Water =

British water supply company

- Type: Private
- Industry: Water supply services
- Founded: 1994
- Headquarters: Durham, England
- Area served: United Kingdom
- Parent: Northumbrian Water Group
- Website: www.eswater.co.uk

Essex and Suffolk Water is a water supply company in the United Kingdom. It operates in two geographically distinct areas, one serving parts of Norfolk and Suffolk, and the other serving parts of Essex and Greater London. The total population served is 1.8 million. Essex and Suffolk is a 'water only' supplier, with sewerage services provided by Anglian Water and Thames Water within its areas of supply. It is part of the Northumbrian Water Group.

== History ==
The South Essex Waterworks Company and the Southend Waterworks Company merged to form the Essex Water Company in 1970. In 1994 the Essex Water Company merged with Suffolk Water Company to form Essex and Suffolk Water. Since 2000 it has been part of Northumbrian Water, but continues to trade under the Essex and Suffolk Water name in the area.

Company history of Essex and Suffolk Water

Southend Waterworks Company (1865–1970)
Essex Water (1970–1994)
South Essex Waterworks Company (1861–1970)
Essex & Suffolk Water (from 1994)
Suffolk Water plc (1991–1994)
Great Yarmouth Waterworks Company (1853–1962)
East Anglian Water Company (1962–1991)
Lowestoft Waterworks Company (1948–1962)
Lowestoft Water and Gas Company (1897–1948)
Lowestoft Gas, Water and Markets Company (1853–1897)

=== Southend Waterworks Company ===
Southend Waterworks Act 1879
- Act of Parliament
- Parliament of the United Kingdom
- Long title: An Act for incorporating the Southend Waterworks Company, and for conferring powers upon them with reference to the construction and maintenance of Works, the supply of Water and otherwise; and for other purposes.
- Citation: 42 & 43 Vict. c. cxx

Dates
- Royal assent: 3 July 1879

Text of statute as originally enacted

Southend Waterworks Act 1907
- Act of Parliament
- Parliament of the United Kingdom
- Long title: An Act to confer further powers upon the Southend Waterworks Company to extend their limits for the supply of water to authorise the transfer to them of the water undertakings of the urban district council of Leigh-on-Sea and the rural district council of Billericay to raise additional capital and for other purposes.
- Citation: 7 Edw. 7. c. lxv

Dates
- Royal assent: 26 July 1907

Other legislation
- Repealed by: Southend Water Order 1958

Status: Repealed

Text of statute as originally enacted

Southend Waterworks Company was formed by Thomas Brassey in 1865, initially to provide water for the steam engines on the new railway line that opened in 1856, with which Brassey was involved. The company constructed the town's first deep borehole in Milton Road, (Southend No.1 Well), along with a reservoir to hold 300,000 gallons. In 1870, Brassey died, and a limited company was formed to take over the works. The company became a statutory undertaker via the Southend Waterworks Act 1879 (42 & 43 Vict. c. cxx). which restricted the amount of money it could borrow, the profits they could retain and the dividend payable to shareholders, but gave them powers to lay pipes beneath public streets and on private land. The company sunk further boreholes in and around Southend. At Vange a treatment works, with a first-of-its-kind lime recovery plant, was built to soften the water. During 1896, the water supply was tested due to cases of Typhoid fever in the town. The investigation concluded that the water quality was good, but poor sanitation was identified. The town's sewer system was defective and there were discharges onto the beach. The sewer system had been found wanting at a previous investigation in 1890 and since then the town council had been upgrading and improving the sewers. The company's boundaries were extended by the Southend Waterworks Act 1907 (7 Edw. 7. c. lxv) to incorporate the areas of both Leigh on Sea Urban District Council and Billericay Rural District Council.

Southend Waterworks Act 1924
- Act of Parliament
- Parliament of the United Kingdom
- Long title: An Act to authorise the Southend Waterworks Company to construct new works and to raise additional capital and for other purposes.
- Citation: 14 & 15 Geo. 5. c. lxii

Dates
- Royal assent: 1 August 1924

Text of statute as originally enacted

By 1924, the company were supplying an area of 160 square miles (410 km^{2}) bounded on the south by the River Thames, on the north by the River Crouch, and stretching westwards to the outskirts of Shenfield. As the volume of water required increased, additional wells were sunk, until there were 36 wells or boreholes in operation. They penetrated a layer of London clay near the surface, and continued into the sands of the Lower London tertiary deposits below that, but the yields obtained were generally poor and gradually diminished over time. In 1921 the company started to look at extracting water from rivers, but failed to obtain parliamentary approval for a joint scheme with the South Essex Waterworks Company to obtain water from the River Stour on the border between Essex and Suffolk. They therefore developed a scheme to extract water from the River Blackwater, the River Chelmer and its tributary, the River Ter. The Southend Waterworks Act 1924 (14 & 15 Geo. 5. c. lxii) was obtained in August 1924, to enable construction of Langford Works, to the west of Maldon.

The project involved the construction of intakes on the Chelmer and Ter, so that water from either or both could be fed into a concrete pipeline which was 33 inches (84 cm) in diameter and 2.5 miles (4.0 km) long. The water flowed by gravity along the pipeline to two sedimentation reservoirs each covering 10.1 acres (4.1 ha) and capable of holding 30 million imperial gallons (140 Ml). Water from the Blackwater intake at Langford Mill is pumped to the sedimentation reservoirs. From there the water flows by gravity to the Langford pumping station. In order to maintain the quality of the water, effluent discharged from the Chelmsford sewage treatment works on the Chelmer and the Witham sewage treatment works on the Blackwater was piped to new outfalls below the intakes.

When built, the Langford pumping station contained two triple-expansion steam engines, with room for a third, which was fitted in 1931. There were used in pairs, and each drove a low lift pump to transfer water to the treatment works, and a high lift pump to take treated water and pump it along a 28-inch (71 cm) cast iron pipe to Southend. The pipe crossed below the River Crouch at Hullbridge, where shafts were built on either side of the river, and a tunnel was constructed between them. The water main is formed of twin steel tubes within the tunnel. The Oakwood storage reservoir was constructed in Bramble Crescent, Hadleigh (51°33′53.3″N 0°37′43.4″E). This was supplied with water from Langford, firstly by the 28-inch main and later by an additional 32-inch main. Oakwood (elevation 65 metres) was the main storage reservoir supplying treated water to Southend by gravity. Additional storage reservoirs were added at Oakwood, increasing the capacity to 17 million gallons (77.2 Ml). The engines were normally worked in pairs, and a pair could deliver 8 million imperial gallons (36 Ml) per day. In August 1927, water from the Chelmer started to be used, and between then and 1945, 96 per cent of the water supplied by Southend Waterworks came from Langford. The wells and boreholes were maintained, to provide a backup supply when necessary.

Essex Water Order 1970
- Statutory Instrument
- Parliament of the United Kingdom
- Citation: SI 1970/786

Dates
- Commencement: 1 July 1970

Other legislation
- Made under: Water Act 1945

In 1960, work began on replacing the steam engines at Langford pumping station with semi-automatic electric pumps. The project cost £260,000, and was formally inaugurated on 31 October 1963, when Sir George Chaplin, the chairman of Essex County Council, switched on the new pumps. In the late 1960s, construction of a new treatment works next to the storage reservoirs began. The works cost £1.5 million, and were opened on 30 June 1970. They can produce 12 million imperial gallons (55 Ml) of treated water per day. Earlier that year, the Essex Water Order 1970 (SI 1970/786) was passed by Parliament, and on 1 April the Southend Waterworks Company amalgamated with the South Essex Waterworks Company to become the Essex Water Company. Negotiations between Maldon District Council, Essex and Suffolk Water and other interested parties in 1996 resulted in the Langford pumping station and its one remaining engine, dating from 1931, becoming the fledgling Museum of Power.

=== South Essex Waterworks Company ===
South Essex Waterworks Act 1861
- Act of Parliament
- Parliament of the United Kingdom
- Long title: An Act for more effectually supplying Water to several Towns and Places in Essex by a Company to be called "South Essex Waterworks Company."
- Citation: 24 & 25 Vict. c. cxxxvii

Dates
- Royal assent: 11 July 1861

South Essex Waterworks Act 1882
- Act of Parliament
- Parliament of the United Kingdom
- Long title: An Act for extending the limits of supply of the South Essex Waterworks Company and for authorising that Company to construct further works and to raise further money and for other purposes.
- Citation: 45 & 46 Vict. c. xlv

Dates
- Royal assent: 19 June 1882

Text of statute as originally enacted

South Essex Waterworks Act 1928
- Act of Parliament
- Parliament of the United Kingdom
- Long title: An Act to authorise the South Essex Waterworks Company to construct new works and to raise additional capital to extend the limits of supply of the Company and for other purposes.
- Citation: 18 & 19 Geo. 5. c. lxxix

Dates
- Royal assent: 3 August 1928

Text of statute as originally enacted

The South Essex Waterworks Company was formed by the South Essex Waterworks Act 1861 (24 & 25 Vict. c. cxxxvii), and supplied drinking water to an area of 103 square miles (270 km^{2}) stretching from Grays to East Ham and from Brentwood to the River Thames. Water was obtained from boreholes sunk into the chalk aquifer underlying the area, but by the time of the First World War, these supplies were not sufficient to meet the demand for water, and so the company looked further afield. Following the failure of the joint scheme with Southend Waterworks Company, they obtained an act of Parliament in 1928, the South Essex Waterworks Act 1928 (18 & 19 Geo. 5. c. lxxix), for a revised scheme which included a water treatment works at Langham with an intake from the River Stour. Treated water was pumped from the works to Tiptree works, and was pumped from there to a reservoir at Danbury. It then flowed by gravity to another storage reservoir at Herongate and then into the distribution network. One condition of the act was that the company had to supply water to other local authorities which were outside their original supply area.

South Essex Waterworks Act 1935
- Act of Parliament
- Parliament of the United Kingdom
- Long title: An Act to authorise the South Essex Waterworks Company to construct new works and to raise additional capital and for other purposes.
- Citation: 25 & 26 Geo. 5. c. xlviii

Dates
- Royal assent: 10 July 1935

Text of statute as originally enacted

South Essex Waterworks Act 1953
- Act of Parliament
- Parliament of the United Kingdom
- Long title: An Act to authorise the South Essex Waterworks Company to consolidate their ordinary stocks and for other purposes.
- Citation: 1 & 2 Eliz. 2. c. ix

Dates
- Royal assent: 6 May 1953

Other legislation
- Repealed by: Essex Water Company (Constitution and Regulation) Order 1991

Status: Repealed

Text of statute as originally enacted

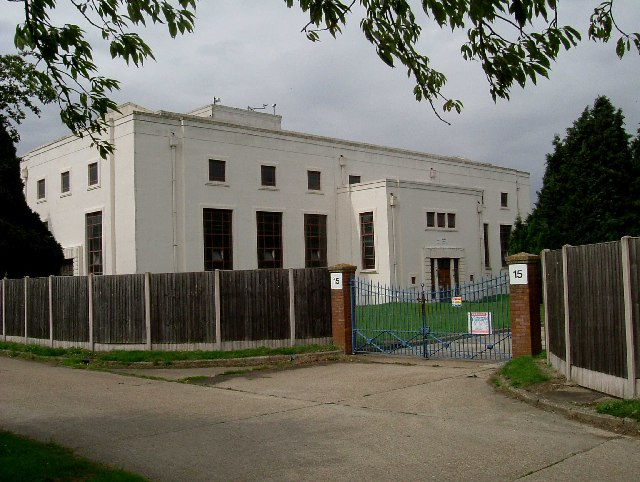
The 1930s-style pump house at Abberton Reservoir

Although the Langham works could supply 12 million imperial gallons (55 Ml) per day, and came online in 1932, they estimated that they would still be facing a shortage by the end of the decade. The company obtained another act of Parliament, the South Essex Waterworks Act 1935 (25 & 26 Geo. 5. c. xlviii), for a second abstraction point on the Stour. This was located at Stratford St. Mary, about 1.5 miles (2.4 km) downstream from the Langham intake. A pumping station pumped up to 35 million imperial gallons (160 Ml) of water per day to the new Abberton Reservoir, and a new treatment works was built at Layer de la Haye near its northern shore. Treated water was pumped to Tiptree, where it was blended with water from Langham. The pipeline from Stratford St. Mary was 11 miles (18 km) long, while Abberton Reservoir covers an area of 1,210 acres (4.9 km^{2}) and lies in the valley of the Layer Brook. When full, it could hold 5,700 million imperial gallons (26,000 Ml). Layer treatment works could process 27 million imperial gallons (125 Ml) per day, and the system was designed to store water from winter rainfall for use in the summer months.

Construction of the reservoir began in March 1936 and continued until the start of the Second World War in 1939. To pass under the River Colne, shafts were constructed on either side of the river, and a 12-foot (3.7 m) diameter tunnel was excavated between the shafts. The miners worked in compressed air, and twin pipes of 32-inch (81 cm) diameter were run through the tunnel. The original pipeline consisted of bitumen-lined steel tubes, some 34 inches (86 cm) and some 36 inches (91 cm) in diameter. A second pipeline of 40-and-42-inch (102 and 107 cm) diameter pipes was subsequently installed. Filling of the reservoir began in 1939 and was completed by the end of 1940. Some minor commissioning work, including the Abberton pumping station, was delayed until the end of hostilities. The project cost £500,000. Many of the construction workers came from Durham, and some stayed on to run the works, including Stanley Aldridge, who had been the engineer, and became the general manager of the Layer works.

=== Joint projects ===
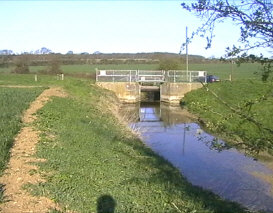
The sluice on Kirtling Brook, where water from the Great Ouse is discharged from the Ely Ouse to Essex Transfer Scheme into the River Stour system

Although the Southend Waterworks Company and the South Essex Waterworks Company did not formally unite until 1970, they co-operated on two major projects prior to that date. These were the construction of Hanningfield Reservoir and the Ely-Ouse to Essex Transfer Scheme.

The construction of Hanningfield Reservoir, which was authorised by the Hanningfield Water Order 1950 (SI 1951/343), and began in 1951, was a joint venture between the two companies. It was built in the Sandon Valley, to the north of Wickford, and covered the hamlet of Peasdown. A 1.25-mile (2.01 km) mass earth dam with a puddle clay core was built across the north-east edge of the site, and a new 9-mile (14 km) pipeline was built from the Langford pumping station to supply the reservoir. The main contractors for the project were W&C French, and it took around five years to complete, with the treatment works beginning production in August 1956. The formal opening took place over a year later, when Henry Brooke, MP, the Minister of Housing and Local Government, performed the ceremony in September 1957. The total cost of the project was £6 million, and when full, the reservoir can hold 5,736 million imperial gallons (26,075 Ml). If supplies around 33 million imperial gallons (150 Ml) of treated water per day, although the maximum throughput of the works is 49 million imperial gallons (225 Ml) per day. Water levels fluctuate seasonally, and during the winter months, up to 53 million imperial gallons (240 Ml) per day are pumped into the reservoir via the Langford pipeline.

In order to meet the rising demands for water faced by both companies, the next major project was the Ely-Ouse to Essex Transfer Scheme. Surplus water in the River Great Ouse, which would otherwise flow into the sea, was to be diverted via a series of channels, tunnels and pipelines to augment supplies to the Abberton and Hanningfield reservoirs. At the northern end, the Cut Off Channel carries the headwaters of the River Lark, the River Little Ouse and the River Wissey to the Great Ouse at Denver Sluice, when those rivers are in flood. An intake was constructed at Blackdyke, close to the Little Ouse, and a tunnel carries the water to a pumping station at Kennett. From there a 6.0-foot (1.83 m) pipeline carries the water to Kirtling Green Outfall, where it enters Kirtling Brook, a tributary of the River Stour. Further down the Stour, some of the water is removed from the river by Wixoe pumping station. A 5.5-foot (1.68 m) diameter pipeline carries it to the Great Sampford outfall, where it is discharged into the River Pant, the name of the upper reaches of the River Blackwater. Construction of the scheme was completed in 1971.

=== Suffolk Water plc ===
Great Yarmouth Waterworks Act 1853
- Act of Parliament
- Parliament of the United Kingdom
- Long title: An Act for supplying the Inhabitants of the Town of Great Yarmouth and adjacent Places with Water.
- Citation: 16 & 17 Vict. c. xvii

Dates
- Royal assent: 13 May 1853

Text of statute as originally enacted

The Great Yarmouth Waterworks Company was set up in 1853, authorised by the Great Yarmouth Waterworks Act 1853 (16 & 17 Vict. c. xvii). They built a waterworks at Ormesby Broad, from where water flowed by gravity into Great Yarmouth. Two steam engines raised the water up to some filter beds. The construction of the distribution network of pipes through the town was completed in 1855, when the Ormesby Waterworks was opened.

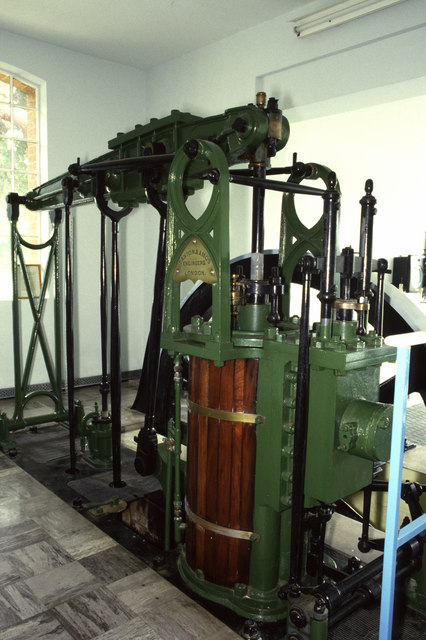
One of the preserved Grasshopper pumping engines at Lound, dating from 1854

Lowestoft Water, Gas and Market Act 1853
- Act of Parliament
- Parliament of the United Kingdom
- Long title: An Act for providing Waterworks and Gasworks for the Town of Lowestoft in the County of Suffolk, and for regulating the Market there, and for other Purposes, of which the Short Title is "The Lowestoft Water, Gas, and Market Act, 1853."
- Citation: 16 & 17 Vict. c. xviii

Dates
- Royal assent: 13 May 1853

Text of statute as originally enacted

Lowestoft Water and Gas Act 1897
- Act of Parliament
- Parliament of the United Kingdom
- Long title: An Act to confer further powers on the Lowestoft Water Gas and Market Company to change the name of the Company and for other purposes.
- Citation: 60 & 61 Vict. c. cx

Dates
- Royal assent: 15 July 1897

Text of statute as originally enacted

Public water supply in Lowestoft also began in 1853, with the creation of the Lowestoft Water, Gas and Market Company by the Lowestoft Water, Gas and Market Act 1853 (16 & 17 Vict. c. xviii). They retained this name until 1897, when they became the Lowestoft Water and Gas Company via the passing of the Lowestoft Water and Gas Act 1897 (60 & 61 Vict. c. cx). The company had an authorised capital of £25,000, and bought the gas works for £5,000. Water was supplied to a tower at Kirkley from a well at Middle West Field, and subsequently from a lake at Bunkers Hill, Lound. From there it was pumped through a 5-mile (8.0 km) pipeline to a covered reservoir located to the north of the town. The pumping station at Lound was probably designed by Thomas Hawksley in 1857, and contained two grasshopper beam engines supplied by Easton and Amos, both of which are preserved in situ, although no longer used for pumping water. They were succeeded by two Ruston & Hornsby 4-cylinder pumps in 1929, which are still used occasionally in emergencies.

Great Yarmouth Waterworks and Lowestoft Water and Gas Act 1907
- Act of Parliament
- Parliament of the United Kingdom
- Long title: An Act to authorise the construction of further waterworks and the taking of water from the River Bure for the purpose of affording increased supplies of water by the Great Yarmouth Waterworks Company and the Lowestoft Water and Gas Company to confer further powers upon those Companies with reference to their respective undertakings and for other purposes.
- Citation: 7 Edw. 7. c. lxxxiv

Dates
- Royal assent: 26 July 1907

Text of statute as originally enacted

Both the company and the Great Yarmouth company were finding that the supplies were inadequate for the populations of the two towns, particularly as there was a large seasonal tourist trade, and in 1906, they attempted to get authorisation for extracting water from the River Bure. The bill faced a rough passage through Parliament, as there were objections to parts of it from Norfolk County Council, the Great Yarmouth Corporation, the Great Yarmouth Court Commissioners, the London Drainage Commissioners, the Ecclesiastical Commissioners for England, and some private individuals. The chief concerns were that removing water from the Bure would impede navigation, and that the quality of the water would be poor, and unfit to supply as drinking water. However, the bill eventually became the Great Yarmouth Waterworks and Lowestoft Water and Gas Act 1907 (7 Edw. 7. c. lxxxiv).

East Anglian Water Order 1962
- Statutory Instrument
- Parliament of the United Kingdom
- Citation: SI 1961/2291

Other legislation
- Made under: Water Act 1945

The two companies amalgamated in 1962 to become the East Anglian Water Company. The merger was sanctioned by the East Anglian Water Order 1962 (SI 1961/2291), using the powers of the Water Act 1945. By this time the Lowestoft Water and Gas Company was known as the Lowestoft Water Company, as all gas companies had been nationalised by the Gas Act 1948. A further change of name occurred on 18 January 1991, when it became Suffolk Water plc, and the new company was taken over by Essex Water on 8 April 1994, to become Essex and Suffolk Water. Both were owned by the French company Lyonnaise des Eaux-Dumez at the time.

=== Essex and Suffolk Water ===
In order to provide improved supplies to Great Yarmouth, the company bought most of the Trinity Broads in 1995. These are isolated from the River Bure by a narrow channel, and have been further protected by the installation of a sluice gate. They were designated as a Site of Special Scientific Interest in 1998. Osmesby Works is situated by the side of Ormesby Broad, and can treat water from the broads. A second source of water is pumped some 18 miles (29 km) from the River Bure to the works. Parts of the works date from the 1930s, and others from the 1950s, but a major upgrade was completed in 2005, to enhance the treatment of water from the broads, which is affected by algal bloom for around a quarter of each year.

To meet long-term supply requirements, the company looked at several options, and in 1997 settled on expanding the capacity of Abberton Reservoir. After ten years of design work and a lengthy tendering process, work began in January 2010 on a project costed at £150 million, to increase the capacity of the reservoir by 58 per cent, and to upgrade the capacity of the Ely-Ouse Essex Transfer Scheme. The clay core of the main dam was raised by 9.5 feet (2.9 m), to allow the water level to be raised by 10.5 feet (3.2 m), increasing the surface area of the reservoir from 1.8 square miles (4.7 km^{2}) to 2.5 square miles (6.5 km^{2}). The original pumping station which pumped water to Layer de la Haye treatment works would have been submerged by the new water levels, and so had to be demolished and rebuilt at a higher level. In order to keep the system operational while this was being done, a temporary pumping station was built on the shore of the reservoir. The new station can deliver 51 million imperial gallons (231 Ml) of raw water per day to the works. Other enhancements at the reservoir site included the construction of a new visitor centre for the Essex Wildlife Trust, and work on the B1026 causeway, which crossed the reservoir at a height where it would be below the level of the new water surface.

With the capacity of the reservoir increased from 5,700 to 9,000 million imperial gallons (26,000 to 41,000 Ml), two new pipelines were constructed, to improve the transfer of water from the Ouse. The Ely Ouse to Essex Transfer Scheme was licensed to allow 100 million imperial gallons (455 Ml) per day to be transferred, but the pumps at the Kennett pumping station could not deliver this volume, and the maximum permitted discharge into the river at Kirtling Green was 76 million imperial gallons (344 Ml) per day. As part of the upgrade, three additional pumps were installed at Kennett. Around 9.6 miles (15.4 km) of new underground pipeline was constructed from Kirtling Green in Suffolk, along the banks of the Stour to Wixoe, where the water discharges into the river. Most is 4-foot (1.2 m) in diameter, but this reduces to 3.3 feet (1.0 m) for the final 2.1 miles (3.4 km), where the gradient is steeper. It can deliver an additional 32 million imperial gallons (145 Ml) per day into the river system.

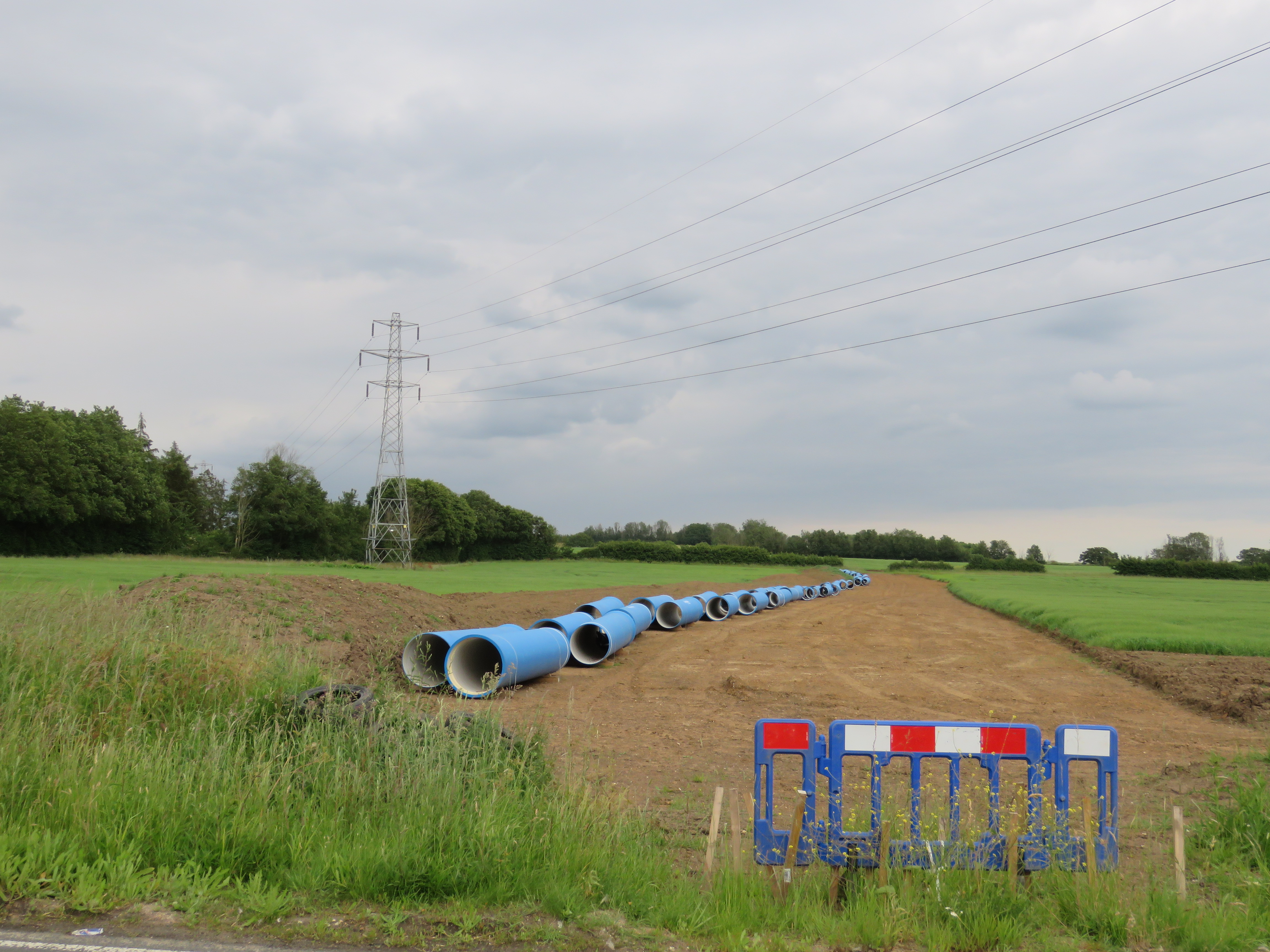
Work on installing pipework for the Layer to Langford pipeline was ongoing in June 2024.

Further down the river, a new pumping station was constructed at Wormingford, to remove the water from the river and pump it to Abberton. A condition of the planning consent was that it should look like a traditional farm building, and so the walls are finished in black timber cladding, and the pitched roof is covered in clay tiles. Two surge vessels protect the pipeline, and are designed to look like grain silos. The pumping station pumps the water for approximately 1.2 miles (2 km) to a break tank, from where it can flow by gravity to the reservoir. Most of the two pipelines were installed using cut and cover techniques, but the southern pipeline passes under the River Colne and beneath the A12 road and the East Coast railway to the west of Colchester. Twin shafts, 23 feet (7 m) in diameter and 66 feet (20 m) deep were excavated, and 490 feet (150 m) of 5-foot (1.5 m) diameter bored tunnel passed under both the road and the railway. The pipeline was then laid through the tunnel and grouted in. The entire project was completed in 2014.

In 2016 and 2022, high temperatures and low rainfall resulted in poor water quality in Abberton Reservoir, and the biological treatment process at Layer de la Haye works could not produce the required volumes of water needed. Consequently, Hanningfield works, which uses a physio-chemical process, was used to produce more water than it normally does, resulting in the water level in Hanningfield Reservoir becoming very low. To prevent the problem re-occurring in the future, Essex and Suffolk Water applied for permission to construct a 12.4-mile (20 km) pipeline from Layer de la Haye to Langford Treatment Works, which like Hanningfield used physio-chemical processing. The pipeline will deliver up to 11 million imperial gallons (50 Ml) per day to Langford, which is taken from the raw water inlet to Layer de la Haye works, and will flow along the pipe by gravity. Installation of the pipes began in February 2024, and is expected to be completed by March 2025, although work to carry the pipeline beneath the River Chelmer and the Langford Cut commenced in September 2023.

== Supply area ==
The company supplies water to an area of 1,105 square miles (2,861 km^{2}) in southeast Norfolk, east Suffolk, Essex and the London boroughs of Barking and Dagenham, Havering and Redbridge in Greater London. The total population served is 1.8 million, through over 735,000 domestic connections and over 47,000 non-household connections. Essex and Suffolk is a 'water only' supplier, with sewerage services supplied by Anglian Water (Essex, Norfolk, Suffolk and part of Upminster) and Thames Water (Greater London and part of Brentwood).

== Bibliography ==
- Barty-King, Hugh (1992). Water The Book. Quiller Press. ISBN 978-1-870948-74-6.
- Chaplin, Patrick; Allen, Irene (2011). "Station History". Museum of Power, Langford. Archived from the original on 8 December 2020.
- ESW (2006). "Abberton Reservoir Expansion Project" (PDF). Essex and Suffolk Water. Archived from the original (PDF) on 5 March 2016.
- Jenkins, Jim (2013a). "Abberton Scheme: Wormingford Pumping Station" (PDF). Water Projects Online. Archived (PDF) from the original on 23 March 2023.
- Jenkins, Jim (2013). "Abberton Pipelines Project" (PDF). Water Projects Online. Archived from the original (PDF) on 4 March 2016.
- Ofwat (2006). "The Development of the Water Industry in England and Wales" (PDF). OFWAT. Archived from the original (PDF) on 16 July 2015.
- SWC (1948). An illustrated description of the works at Langford, Maldon. Southend Waterworks Company. Archived from the original on 24 October 2017.
- Walker, Guy (2004). "Ormesby WTW - Trihalomethane Project" (PDF). Water Projects Online. Archived from the original (PDF) on 4 March 2016.
- Wilson, Daniel (2012). "Abberton Reservoir enhancement" (PDF). Water Projects Online. Archived from the original (PDF) on 3 March 2016.
- Wilson, Daniel; Robertson, Craig (24 July 2023). "Layer to Langford Pipeline (2023)". Water Projects Online. Archived from the original on 11 June 2024.
