= Northumbrian Water Group =

Water company

Northumbrian Water Group plc
- Company type: Subsidiary
- Industry: Water
- Founded: 1989
- Headquarters: Durham, UK
- Key people: Andrew Hunter (chairman), Heidi Mottram OBE (chief executive officer)
- Revenue: £704.7 million (2010)
- Operating income: £275.8m (2010)
- Net income: £122.9m (2010)
- Parent: Cheung Kong Infrastructure Holdings
- Website: www.nwg.co.uk

Northumbrian Water Group plc (NWG) is the holding company for several companies in the water supply, sewerage and waste water industries. Its largest subsidiary is Northumbrian Water Limited (NWL), which is one of ten companies in England and Wales that are regulated water supply and sewerage utilities. NWL is the principal water supplier in the north-east of England, where it trades as Northumbrian Water, and also supplies water to part of eastern England, as Essex and Suffolk Water. In 2011 it was acquired by Cheung Kong Infrastructure Holdings.

== History ==
In 1974, the Northumbrian Water Authority (NWA), one of ten public sector regional water authorities created under the Water Act 1973, was formed and became responsible for sewerage and some water supply functions that had previously been split among over 80 local authorities and water undertakings. Water supply to more than half the region was left in the hands of three existing statutory water companies (SWC):

- Hartlepool Water Company
- Newcastle and Gateshead Water Company
- Sunderland and South Shields Water Company

In 1988, the Newcastle & Gateshead and Sunderland & South Shields companies were acquired in two separate operations by Lyonnaise des Eaux et de l'Eclairage (Lyonnaise), a company listed on the Paris Bourse, for £39.1m and £35.9m respectively. In 1992, the Newcastle company was merged into the Sunderland company, which was renamed North East Water (NEW).

In 1988, Lyonnaise acquired two further SWCs, Essex Water Company and Suffolk Water Company (formerly East Anglian Water Company) and, in 1994, merged them to form Essex and Suffolk Water.

Under the Water Act 1989, as part of the UK government's privatisation programme for the water industry, NWA's operations were transferred to a holding company, Northumbrian Water Group (NWG); the water and sewerage activities were vested in a subsidiary company, Northumbrian Water Limited (NWL), while three much smaller subsidiaries were set up to handle other activities, such as solid and liquid waste treatment and environmental consultancy. In November 1989, NWG was privatised, along with the other regional water companies established under the 1989 act.

In 1995, Lyonnaise acquired NWG at a cost of £823m. The following year, it merged NEW into NWL—which thus became responsible for all water supply in the region, except for the Hartlepool area—and in 2000 it merged Essex and Suffolk Water into NWL.

In May 2003 Suez, who had acquired Lyonnaise by merger in 1997, sold 75% of NWG to a consortium of private investors, and the company was listed on the London Stock Exchange in September 2003.

In 2011 it was acquired by Cheung Kong Infrastructure Holdings.

== Group structure ==
Northumbrian Water Limited (NWL) is a wholly owned subsidiary of Northumbrian Water Group Limited (NWGL). NWGL has two other direct subsidiaries, NWG Commercial Solutions Limited, which acts as a holding company for other non-regulated trading companies, and NWG Business Limited, which carries out non-household retail activities in England and in Scotland and to which NWL’s non-household customer base transferred at the opening of the market in April 2017 (except for customers who pre-registered to switch retailer upon the market opening).

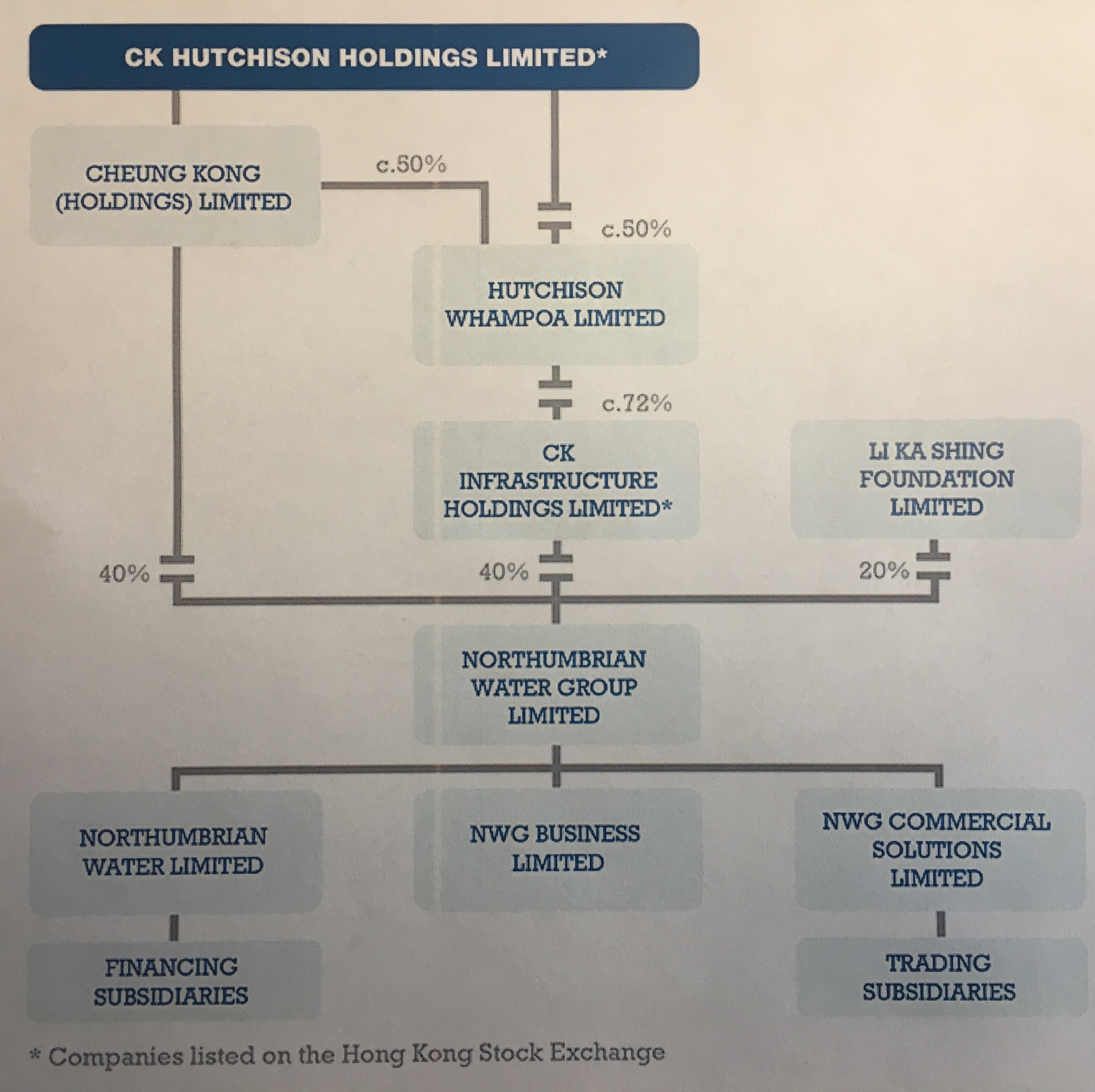
NWG Group structure

This chart shows the structure of the Northumbrian Water group up to its ultimate parent, CK Hutchison Holdings Limited, a company listed on the Hong Kong Stock Exchange. The chart shows the principal intermediate holding companies, which are wholly owned unless otherwise shown.

== Northumbrian Water Limited ==
NWL is by far the largest of NWG's subsidiaries. In 2010 it accounted for £657.8m out of the group's total revenue of £704.7m (93%), and for £268.9m out of total operating profit of £275.8m (97%), and employed 2,930 of the group's 3,105 employees (94%).

NWL holds an appointment under the Water Act 1989 as a water and sewerage undertaker. The appointment covers two areas:

- water and sewerage services in the counties of Northumberland, Tyne and Wear, Durham and parts of North Yorkshire (including the Teesside conurbation), except for a small area around Hartlepool that is excluded from the water supply licence because it is still supplied by Hartlepool Water, a water-only company that is now owned by Anglian Water.
- water-only services in an area of eastern England covering part of the counties of Essex and Suffolk.

Although the Instrument of Appointment covers both the northern and southern areas, for operational purposes NWL treats them as separate trading divisions, Northumbrian Water and Essex & Suffolk Water.

== Other activities ==
NWG is involved in two projects to build and operate waste water treatment plants in Scotland, one at Levenmouth (Caledonian Environmental) and three in Ayrshire (Ayr Environmental). It also operates a waste water treatment plant for Cork City Council, in Ireland (Northumbrian Water Projects), and is the major partner in a joint venture with the Government of Gibraltar (AquaGib) that operates the territory's dual drinking water and sea water distribution systems. Other minor activities include consultancy (SA Agrer NV) and vehicle leasing services.

== Management ==
NWG's present chairman is Andrew Hunter. The Group's chief executive is Heidi Mottram OBE, who was appointed in April 2010. She previously held senior positions in the rail industry and was appointed an OBE in the 2010 New Year honours list, for services to the rail industry.
