= St Mary's Buttsbury =

Historic church in Essex

Coordinates: 51°39′42″N 0°24′16″E

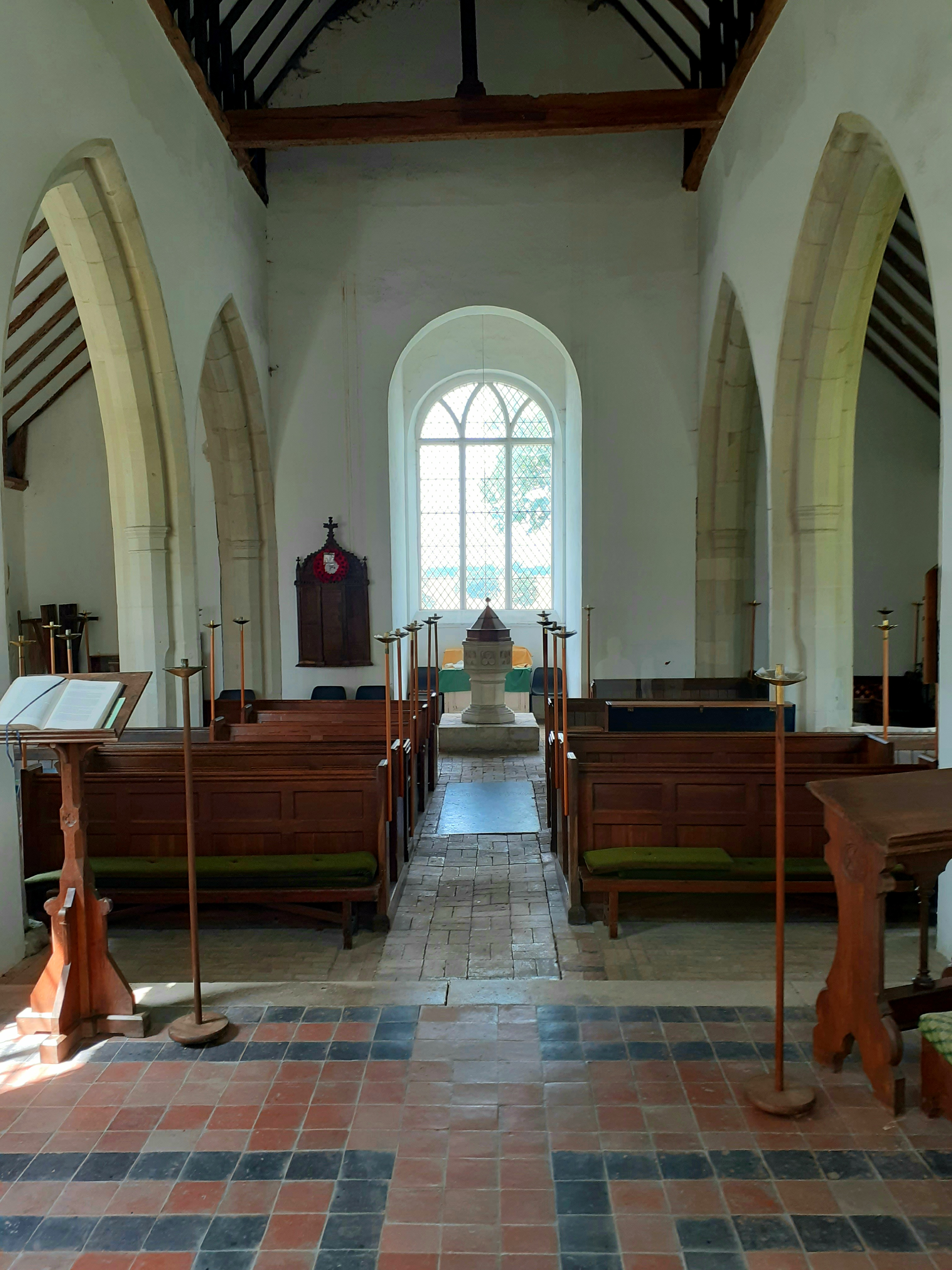
Nave of St Mary's Buttsbury (14th century)

St Mary's is a Grade II* listed parish church in the village of Buttsbury, approximately 1.5 miles (2.4 km) north west of Ingatestone and 3.8 miles (6.1 km) south east of Billericay in Essex, England. The present building dates from the 14th century, but St Mary's Church was mentioned in 1170, and the site is believed to have been where St Botolph preached under a pear tree in the 7th century.

== History ==
=== Roman Period. ===
Roman Tiles are built within the walls of the Nave & Chancel and can be seen from the exterior, metal detectorists from Havering have found Roman coins in the fields which surround the church, so we can assume that a settlement was here where the church stands today.

=== Saxon period ===
St Botulph is said to have preached under a pear tree in the area of Buttsbury, therefore its highly likely that the church of St Mary was built on this spot, in Saxon times Buttsbury was known as Cingam, which meant "Dwellers in the district", in Saxon times the land was owned by the family Bond or Bodis.

=== Norman period ===
In 1086 Buttsbury was entered in Domesday Book under the name Cinga; the landowner was Henry de Ferrers, a Norman. The exact building date of St Mary's is unknown, but the church is first mentioned 1190, when Buttsbury was given to the nunnery of St Leonard-atte-bow in London.

== Church Position. ==
St Mary's Church is situated in an isolated position surrounded by active farmland on three sides, the River Wid flows past just West to St Marys, and a road junction on east side, the roads connect to Ingatestone, Stock & Billericay.

=== Construction ===
The small church has a very short (2-bay) 14th-century nave, with 15th-century north and south aisles wider than they are long. (This may well point to the original Saxon layout.) The aisles are built mainly in flint rubble with stone dressings and large 14th-century east windows; they were heavily renovated in the 18th and 19th centuries.

The chancel was also built in the 14th century, although it too has undergone renovation and reconstruction. In 1876 the east window was fitted in the Perpendicular style, the north and south sides' windows were fitted in the late 18th and early 19th century, and the exterior was heavily refurbished with cement mortar.

The north aisle door is of 12th Century construction, it was carbon dated to 1170, the Medieval Ironwork possibly pre dating this to the Viking period.

The west tower is built of brick, having been reconstructed in the 18th century, with a weather boarded top tower and brick buttresses. In the 17th century the tower was built of rubble, with a tall spire.

=== Church Renovations. ===
During the Victorian period, around 1876 St Marys underwent a major Restoration program, the west tower was reconstructed in brick, the spire reduced in height to the present design, the internal arches in the Nave were reconstructed, and the South Porch added.

In June 1927 the North Aisle window was restored in memory of Edward Guard Rock.

In September 2021, the South Porch underwent restoration, replacement of timber, and painting internally and externally.

== Church Features and Memorials. ==
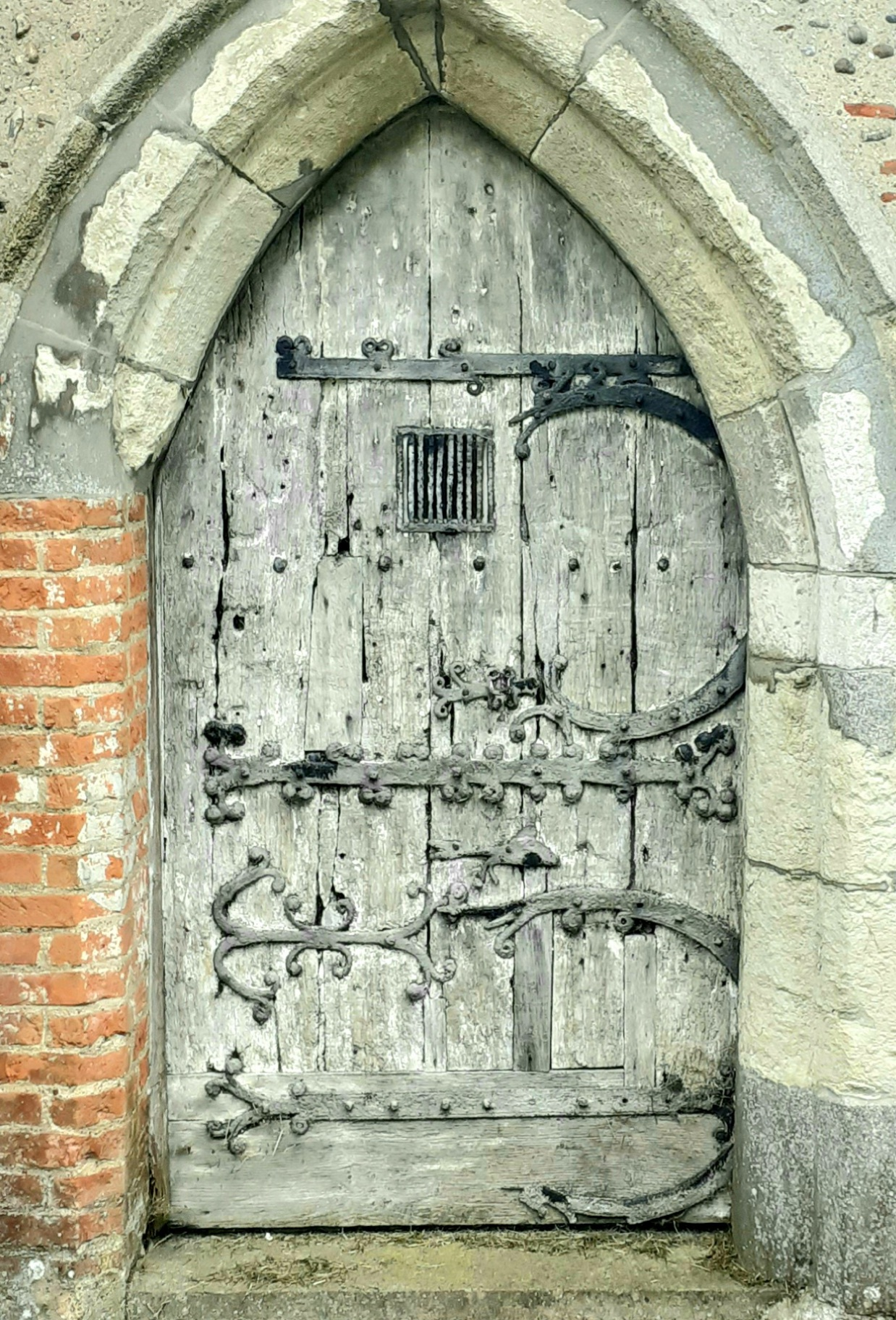

The North Aisle door is of particular historical importance. This 5-plank oak door was carbon dated, with the results indicating that its timber was felled in 1156 and it was constructed between 1156 and 1180. The door has two iron hinges, featuring the head and tail of a Norse serpent (Jormungandr) possibly of Viking origin, and three iron straps.

In the Chancel on the South wall is a painting from the medial period of the Last Judgement, it depicts Jesus Christ, with an Angel either side, one Angel holds the nail from the crucifixion and the other holds the spear, the painting was discovered by workmen when working in the oak roof structure, the oak board may well have been hidden in the roof at the time of the English reformation.

Set in the floor of the Nave & the North Aisle are two memorial slabs from the 17th century.

On the West wall of the Nave a WW1 Memorial unusual in design, on the left and right panels, it lists the men from Buttsbury who were enlisted to serve in WW1, and the centre panel shows who had died and did not return.

== Today ==
St Mary's is open for service every Sunday. The services are traditional and follow the Book of Common Prayer; the church has no electricity, so services are illuminated by candlelight. Other services carried out in the church are baptisms, marriages and funerals. St Mary's is part of the Diocese of Chelmsford, in which since August 2004, Buttsbury Village has constituted part of the benefice of Margaretting with Mountnessing and Buttsbury.

St Mary's church has an association with Margaretting Church of England Primary School.

The upkeep of the church is supported by volunteers, including a grounds keeping and maintenance group, a floral-arranging group and a cleaning group.

The Church participates each year in the charity event 'Ride & Stride' which takes place in mid September, money raised helps restore Essex Churches.
