= South Hanningfield =

Village in Essex, England

Coordinates: 51.6504°N 0.5183°E

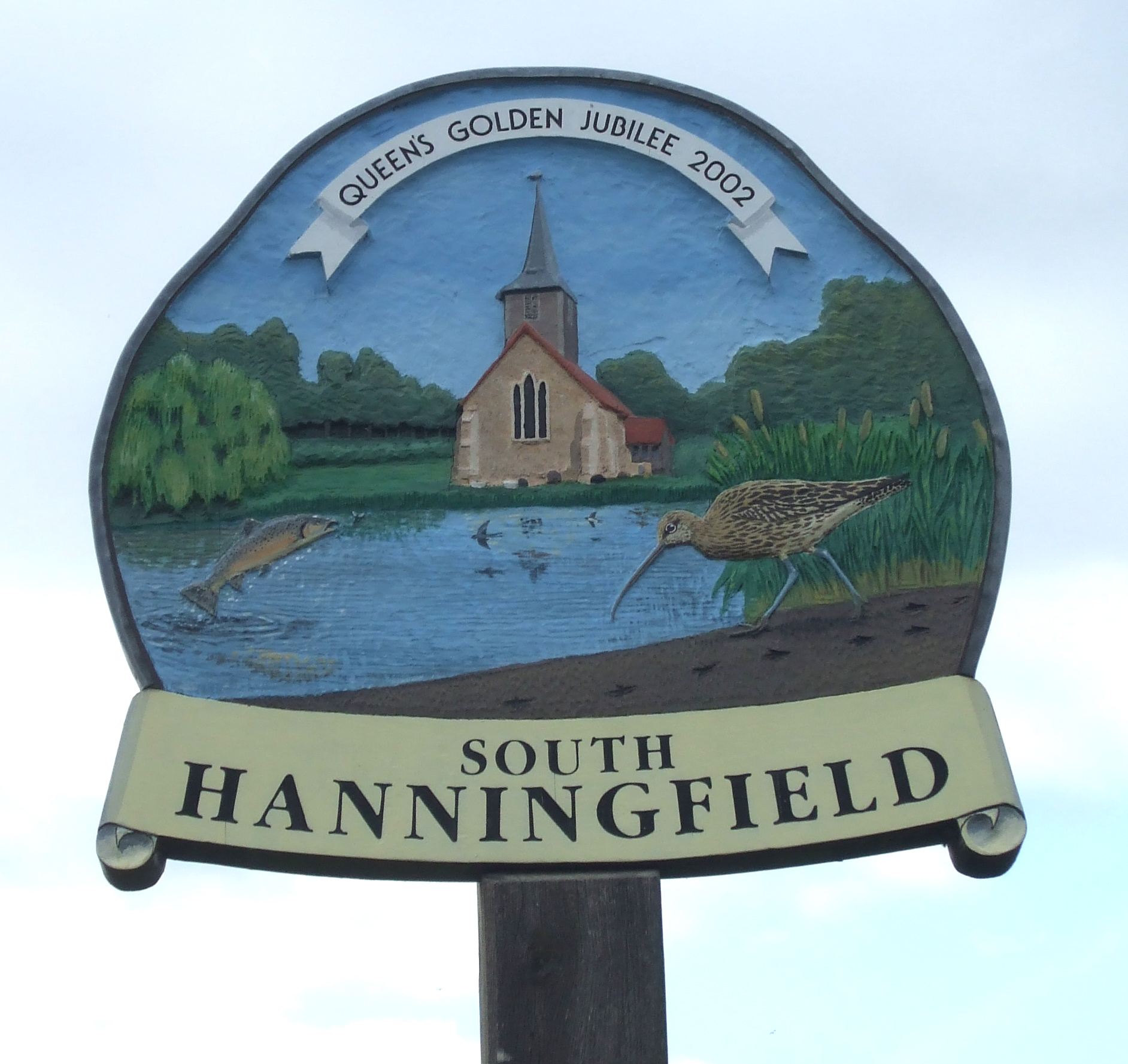
- Village sign

- Location within Essex
- Population: 2,692 (Parish, 2021)
- OS grid reference: TQ743976
- Civil parish: South Hanningfield
- District: Chelmsford
- Shire county: Essex
- Region: East
- Country: England
- Sovereign state: United Kingdom
- Post town: CHELMSFORD
- Postcode district: CM3
- Dialling code: 01268
- Police: Essex
- Fire: Essex
- Ambulance: East of England
- UK Parliament: Maldon
- Website: South Hanningfield village

South Hanningfield is a village and civil parish in the Chelmsford district of Essex, England. The village is located on the south bank of the Hanningfield Reservoir, around 6 miles (10 km) south-southeast of the city of Chelmsford, and around 2 1/2 miles (4 km) north of Wickford. At the 2021 census the parish had a population of 2,692.

The centre of South Hanningfield is situated around the village green, known as the Tye. A village hall is located on the east side of the Tye, while on the west side is a pub, the Old Windmill. There are approximately 69 households in the village. St Peter's Church overlooks the reservoir.

The civil parish includes the larger villages of Ramsden Heath and Downham.

== See also ==
- Hanningfield Reservoir
- East Hanningfield
- West Hanningfield
- Lord Hanningfield
