= Hanningfield Reservoir =

Reservoir in Essex, United Kingdom

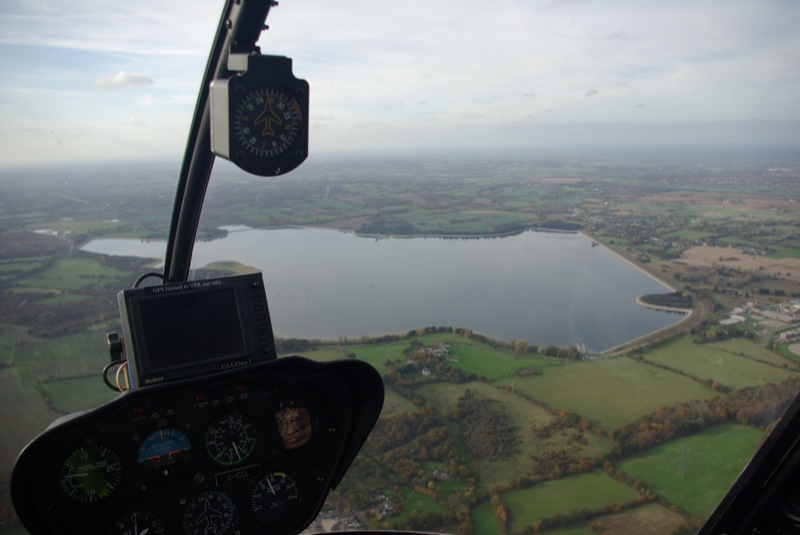
- Aerial view with dam at right

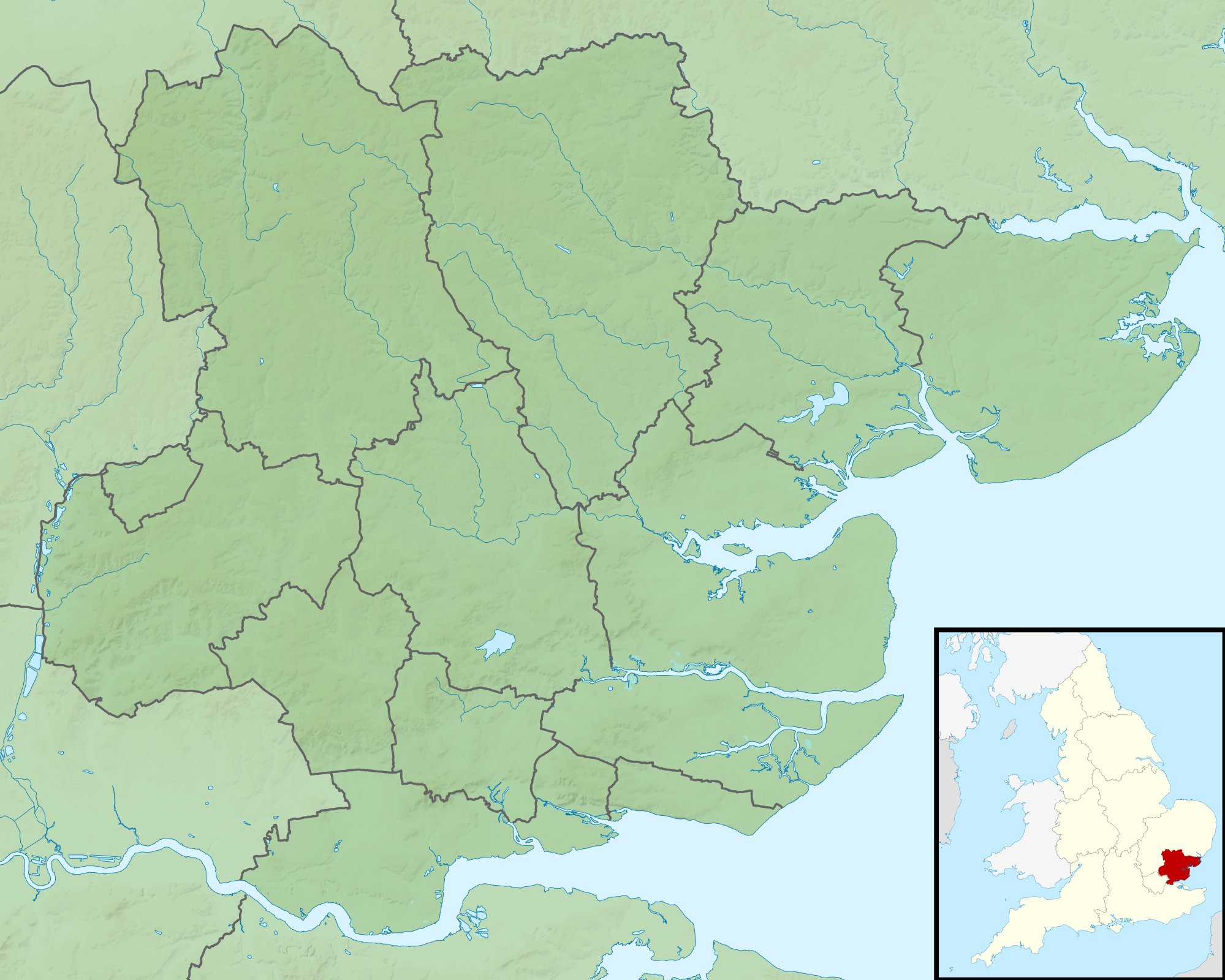
- Location within Essex
- Location: Essex
- Coordinates: 51°39′30″N 0°30′15″E
- Type: reservoir
- Primary inflows: 240 Ml/d
- Primary outflows: 210 Ml/d
- Basin countries: United Kingdom
- Managing agency: Essex and Suffolk Water
- Built: 1951-57
- First flooded: 1957
- Max. width: 3.25 km (2.02 mi)
- Surface area: 352 ha (870 acres)
- Average depth: 7.62 m (25.0 ft)
- Max. depth: 16.76 m (55.0 ft)
- Water volume: 25,500 million litres (900,000,000 ft^{3})
- Shore length^{1}: 6 mi (9.7 km)
- Surface elevation: 55 m (180 ft)
- Islands: None
- Site of Special Scientific Interest
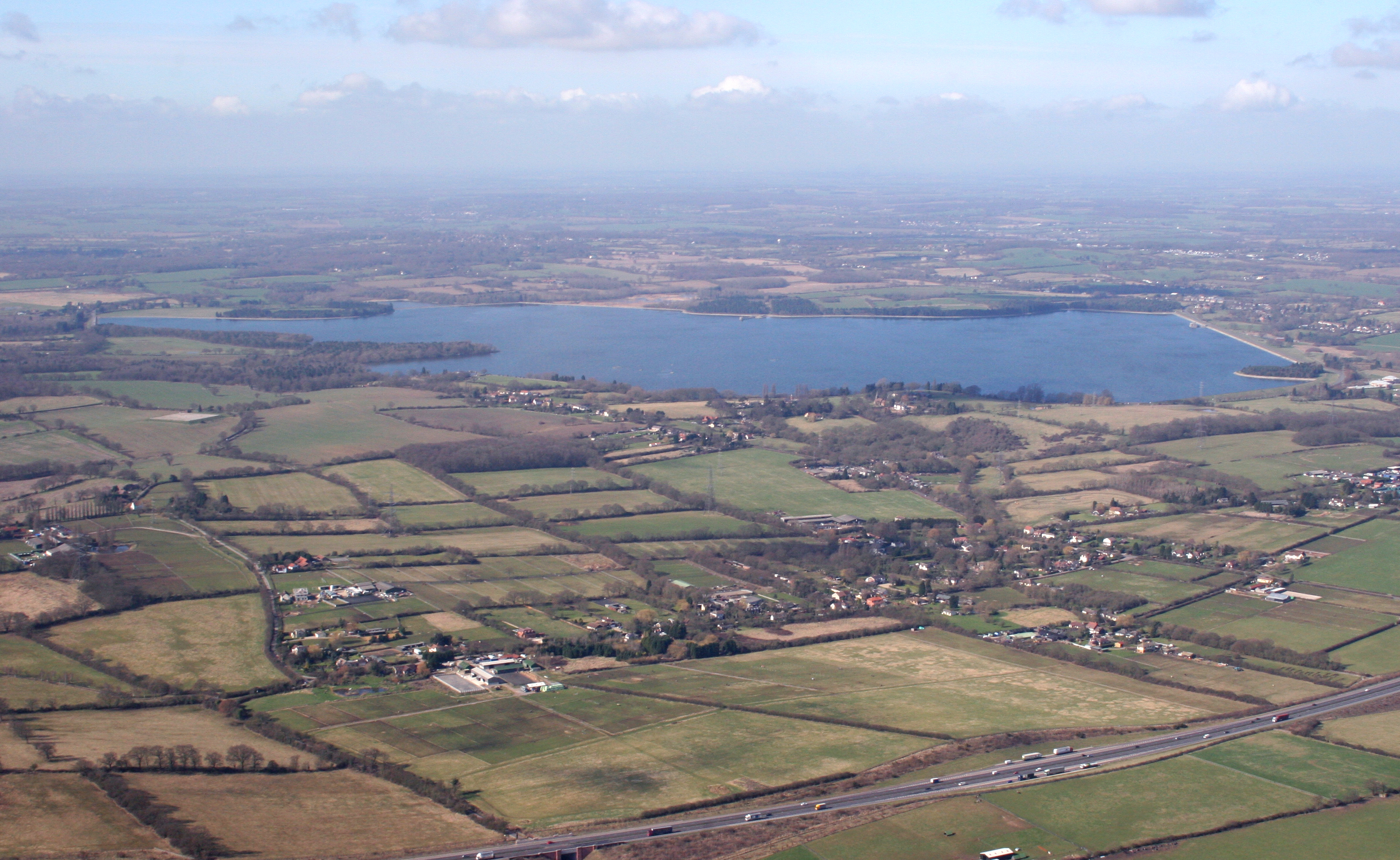
- Area of search: Essex
- Grid reference: TQ 730980
- Interest: Biological
- Area: 402.9 ha (996 acres)
- Notification date: 1985
- ^{1} Shore length is not a well-defined measure.

Hanningfield Reservoir is a large 25,500-million-litre (900,000,000 ft^{3}) pumped storage reservoir located between Billericay and Chelmsford in Essex. It has a surface area of 352 hectares (870 acres) and is owned and operated by Essex and Suffolk Water.

The reservoir is part of a 402.9 ha (996 acres) biological Site of Special Scientific Interest. The site is also owned by Essex and Suffolk Water and is run by them in conjunction with the Essex Wildlife Trust. The reservoir is covered by a Bird Sanctuary Order.

== Description ==
Hanningfield is the 11th largest reservoir in England with an area of 3.52 km^{2} (870 acres). The reservoir has a limited natural water catchment area and is principally supplied with water abstracted from the River Chelmer and River Blackwater at Langford about 14 km (8.7 mi) north east of Hanningfield. Water is pumped from Langford at up to 240 Ml/day through a 48-inch (1.2 m) diameter underground pipeline.

The Hanningfield scheme was a joint venture by the South Essex Waterworks Company and the Southend Waterworks Company. The reservoir was built in an area known as Sandon Valley, construction was started in 1951 and entailed flooding an area of South Hanningfield covering the ancient hamlet of Peasdown. Giffords Farm and Fremnells Manor were also demolished. The reservoir was completed by W. & C. French in 1957 at a cost of about £6m; the reservoir took 200 days to fill with water. The dam is 2,088 metres (6,850 ft) long. It is an earth dam with a core of puddled clay, the inner wall is concreted to mitigate erosion by wave action.

The South Essex Waterworks Company and the Southend Waterworks Company merged to form the Essex Water Company in 1970. In 1994 the Essex Water Company merged with Suffolk Water Company to form Essex and Suffolk Water.

=== Hanningfield Water Treatment Works ===
Hanningfield Water Treatment Works was built adjacent to the reservoir. This treats and delivers 210 Ml/day of potable water to south Essex and Southend-on-Sea. The original plant comprised four circular accelerators, as the demand increased so vertical flow softening tanks were installed from 1970 to 1973. Further filters were commissioned in 1983.

The raw water contains algae, organic matter, pesticides, and is too hard. These are treated and removed prior to distribution. The treatment entails clarification, carbonate removal, filtration and polishing. Raw water from the reservoir is treated with ozone then dosed with a coagulant and flocculant. The water flows to three pulsators where organic substances are removed. It is then dosed with lime and pumped to the base of one of eight gyrazurs – a granular contact mass reactor – where carbonate is removed. Water is then dosed with sulphuric acid to reduce alkalinity and flows to dual media sand filters where remaining particulates are removed. Water is then dosed with ozone and flows through granular activated carbon filters. After dosing with chloramine it is stored in a large contact tank. Prior to distribution the water is dosed with phosphoric acid to reduce the dissolution of lead in the distribution system.

=== Nature and recreation ===
Large parts of the reservoir and surrounding countryside have been developed as a nature reserve. There are many footpaths in the woodland around the water where wildlife can be seen, and hides have been erected, with views of the visiting and resident birds. The public can use the reservoir for seasonal fly fishing both from the bank and from boats, providing a fishing permit is bought in advance. The water is regularly stocked with rainbow trout; the heaviest fish ever caught, in 1998, weighed 24 lb 1 oz (10.9 kg).

There are two cafés at each end of the reservoir: the newer, opened in 2007, is next to the fishing lodge with a deck overlooking the water, and the other is at the Essex Wildlife Trust visitors' centre.

== Wildlife ==
The reservoir has a nationally important population of gadwall ducks, and it also has significant numbers of pochards, teal, tufted ducks and pintails. The chalk sludge lagoon has several unusual plants, including golden dock and marsh dock, and there is a rare moss Brachythecium mildeanum at the foot of the southern dam.
