= 2027 Chelmsford City Council election =

2027 English local government election

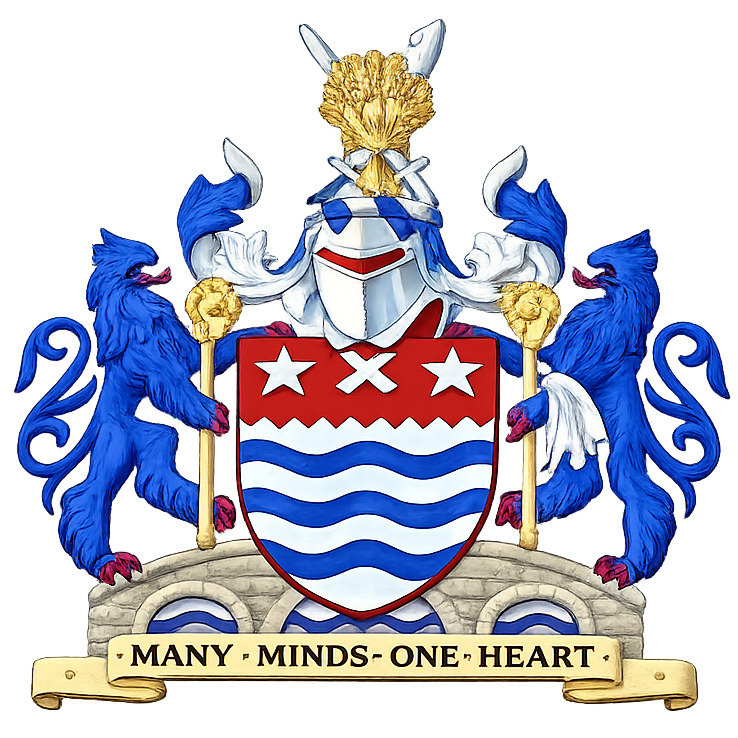
- 6 May 2027

All 57 seats to Chelmsford City Council 29 seats needed for a majority
Leader	Stephen Robinson	Roy Whitehead	Richard Hyland (Note: Leader of the Chelmsford Independents Group.)
Party	Liberal Democrats	Conservative	Independent
Leader's seat	St Andrews	South Hanningfield, Stock & Margaretting	Galleywood
Last election	33 seats, 41.7%	21 seats, 39.8%	2 seats, 4.7%
Current seats	31	19	3
Leader		Richard Hyland
Party	Reform	Ind. Network
Leader's seat		Galleywood
Last election	Did not stand	1 seat, 4.7% (Note: Vote share for Independent Network from previous election included under Independent share.)
Current seats	2	1
Incumbent Leader
Stephen Robinson
Liberal Democrats

The 2027 Chelmsford City Council election will be held on 6 May 2027 to elect members of Chelmsford City Council in Essex, England. This will be on the same day as other local elections held across the United Kingdom.

== Background ==
=== Local government reorganisation ===
Due to proposed structural changes to local government in England, the 2023 election would have been the final election to the council before it was abolished and replaced by Mid Essex Council, a unitary authority. However, on 7 September 2026, the government announced it was withdrawing plans for the planned restructuring pending review. Following this announcement, local elections due to be held in 2027 under the existing local electoral calendar would proceed.

== Summary ==
=== Election result ===
2027 Chelmsford City Council election
Party	Candidates	Seats	Gains	Losses	Net gain/loss	Seats %	Votes %	Votes	+/−
Liberal Democrats									
Conservative									
Independent									
Reform									
Ind. Network									
