= Chignall St James =

Village in Essex, England

Coordinates: 51.76173°N 0.41757°E

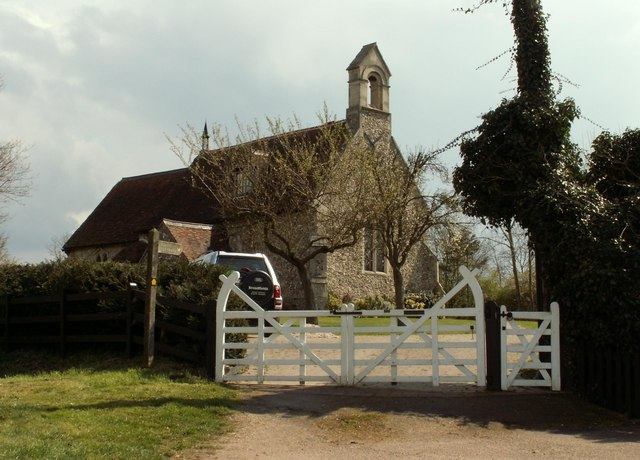
- Former parish church of St James, now converted to a house

- Location within Essex
- Civil parish: Chignall
- District: Chelmsford
- Shire county: Essex
- Region: East
- Country: England
- Sovereign state: United Kingdom
- Post town: CHELMSFORD
- Postcode district: CM1
- Dialling code: 01245
- Police: Essex
- Fire: Essex
- Ambulance: East of England

Chignall St James is a village in the civil parish of Chignall, in the Chelmsford district of Essex, England. The village is situated 3 miles (5 km) north-west of the centre of Chelmsford.

== Toponymy ==
The meaning of Chignall is uncertain. The second syllable indicates "nook of land", indicating perhaps an area of dry land in a marsh, or an area otherwise separated from its parent territory. The first syllable may come from a personal name "Cicca", or alternatively it may come from "chicken".

The legal name of the parish uses the spelling "Chignall", which is therefore used on Ordnance Survey maps and by the Office for National Statistics. The Royal Mail uses the spelling "Chignal" in official postal addresses. The parish council uses the spelling Chignal on its website.

== History ==
The area once included a Roman villa, the site of which was discovered in the 1970s.

In Saxon times, Chignall appears to have been a single vill. It was recorded in the Domesday Book of 1086 as Cingehala in the Chelmsford hundred of Essex. The vill was at that time split between two owners.

A priest is mentioned in one of the Domesday entries for Chignall, implying it may have then been a parish. It is unclear where the church was at that time. The church of St James at Chignall St James dates back to at least the 13th century, and the church of St Nicholas at Chignall Smealy was built in the early 16th century. A third church dedicated to St Mary is known to have formerly existed at Chignall, which had been demolished by the 18th century. The area came to be administered as the two parishes of Chignall St James and Chignall Smealy, with the latter sometimes called "Little Chignall".

In 1888 the parishes of Chignall St James and Chignall Smealy were merged into a new civil parish called Chignall, subject to some adjustments to the boundaries with the neighbouring parishes Broomfield and Writtle at the same time. At the 1881 census (the last before the abolition of the civil parish), Chignall St James had a population of 224.

In ecclesiastical terms, Chignall St James, Chignall Smealy and the neighbouring parish of Mashbury were united into a single benefice in 1930. They were later formally united into a single ecclesiastical parish called "The Chignals with Mashbury", which uses St Nicholas's Church at Chignall Smealy as its parish church. St James's Church was declared redundant in 1981; it was converted into a house a few years later.

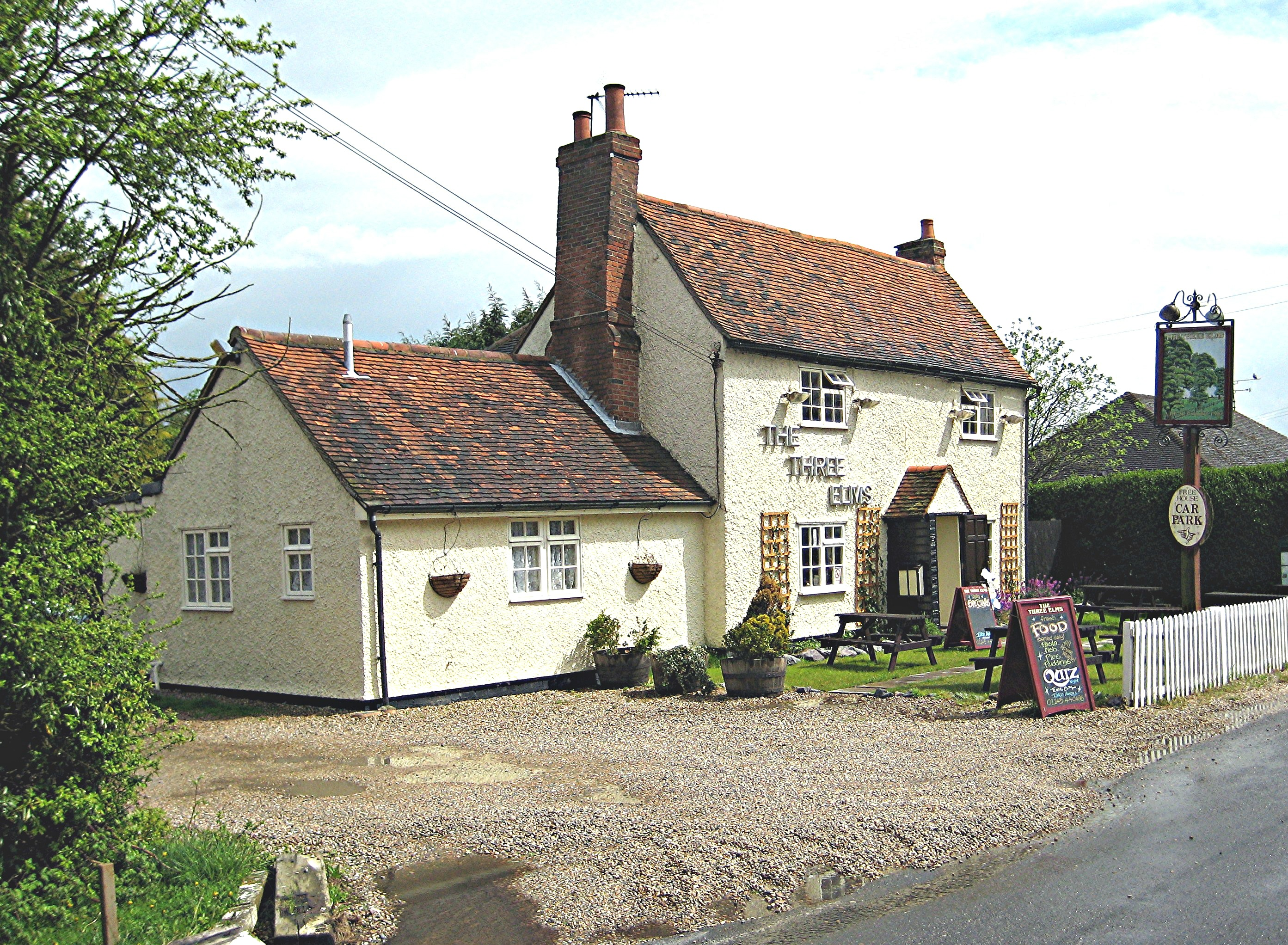
The Three Elms public house, photographed prior to its closure in 2019

The village formerly had a public house, the Three Elms, which closed in 2019.

== Geography ==
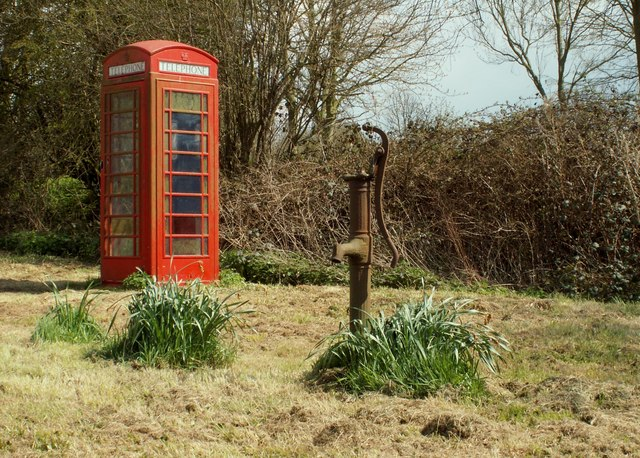
Village pump and telephone box

Businesses providing employment in the area include Ashdown Engineering, Gardening Express and local farms.

Notable village landmarks include an old brick-built farm barn with a dove-cote thought to be the oldest and only example of its type in Essex, an old red brick school (now a dwelling), the former church, and the Old Rectory.
