= Woodham Ferrers =

Village in Essex, England

Coordinates: 51.67°N 0.598°E

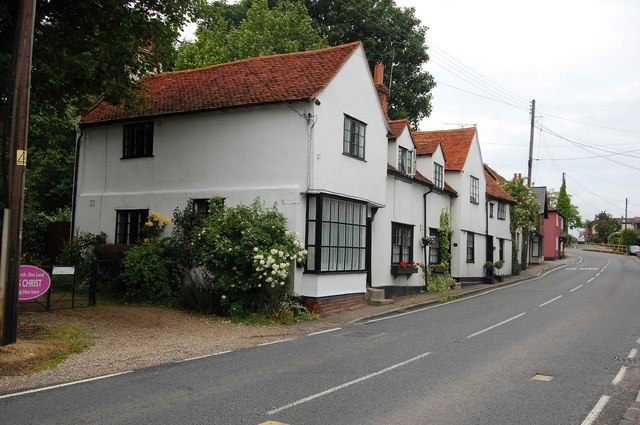
- Church Cottages, Woodham Ferrers

- Location within Essex
- Area: 0.330 km^{2} (0.127 sq mi)
- Population: 325 (Built up area, 2021)
  - Density: 985/km^{2} (2,550/sq mi)
- OS grid reference: TL7963100050
- Civil parish: Woodham Ferrers and Bicknacre
- District: Chelmsford
- Shire county: Essex
- Region: East
- Country: England
- Sovereign state: United Kingdom
- Post town: CHELMSFORD
- Postcode district: CM3
- Dialling code: 01245
- Police: Essex
- Fire: Essex
- Ambulance: East of England
- UK Parliament: Maldon & East Chelmsford

Woodham Ferrers is a village in the civil parish of Woodham Ferrers and Bicknacre in the City of Chelmsford district of Essex, England. It lies 8 miles (13 km) south-east of Chelmsford, between South Woodham Ferrers and Bicknacre. The village is often shortened to Woodham by those in the area. The village is also sometimes referred to as North Woodham due to its geographical relationship with South Woodham Ferrers. At the 2021 census the built up area as defined by the Office for National Statistics had a population of 325.

== History ==
Originally a hermitage during the reign of Henry II the name Woodham was adopted in 1175 when it became a priory, including 60 acres (240,000 m^{2}) of forest stretching towards Danbury.

In the late 13th century the manor of Woodham Ferrers passed briefly to the Scottish noble house of Douglas by virtue of the marriage of William the Hardy, Lord of Douglas to Eleanor de Lovaine, the widow of William de Ferrers of Groby. Eleanor was a ward of Edward I, and had her late husband's manors of Stebbing and Woodham Ferrers made into a dowry for a future re-marriage. Douglas absconded with Eleanor, when she was attending to her late husband's estates in Scotland, and married her c.1288. Douglas, a significant figure on the Scottish side during the First Scottish War of Independence, had his English manors finally forfeited by 1298 when he died of mistreatment in the Tower of London. His son Hugh Douglas having been captured previously at Stebbing in 1296, by the Sheriff of Essex.

There is a residence in the village that was once owned by the Bishop of York and was attacked during the Peasants' Revolt in 1381.

At the turn of the 16th century, the convent was used as a hospital until being returned to the church in 1540.

Due to the proximity of both the Marconi Company and North Weald Airfield, the village was in the flight path for a number of air-raids during World War II; however it was not a direct target itself.

Woodham Ferrers was an ancient parish in the Chelmsford hundred of Essex. As well as the village itself, the parish included surrounding rural areas, stretching from Bicknacre in the north down to the River Crouch in the south. When the Southminster branch of the Great Eastern Railway was built it passed through the parish, but 1 mile (1.6 km) south of the village itself, following the flatter land south of the hill on which Woodham Ferrers village stands. Woodham Ferrers railway station opened with the line in 1889 to serve the area. A new settlement grew up around the station, which became known as South Woodham Ferrers. In 1987, a new parish of South Woodham Ferrers was created from the southern part of the old Woodham Ferrers parish, and the remainder was renamed "Woodham Ferrers and Bicknacre". At the 1971 census (the penultimate one before the split and rename), Woodham Ferrers had a population of 4297. The railway station was renamed South Woodham Ferrers in 2007.

== Education ==
The village is served by St. Mary's C of E primary school.

== Religious sites ==
St Mary's Church, situated at the south end of the village, was recorded in the Domesday Book in 1086.
