= Chignall Smealy =

Village in Essex, England

Coordinates: 51.778°N 0.416°E

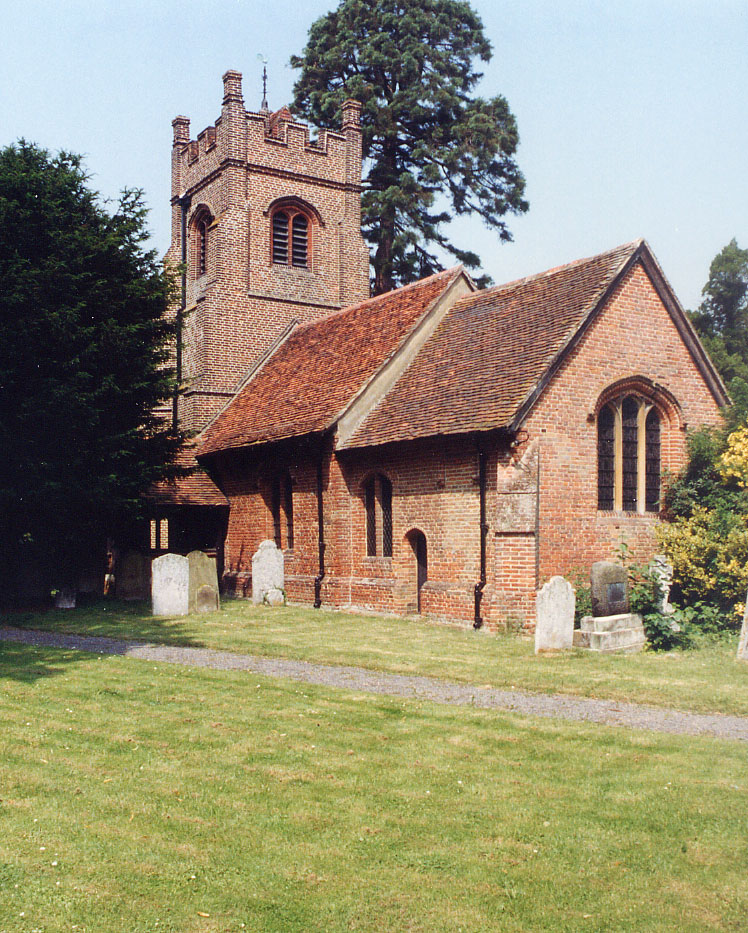
- Church of St Nicholas

- Location within Essex
- OS grid reference: TL663113
- Civil parish: Chignall
- District: Chelmsford
- Shire county: Essex
- Region: East
- Country: England
- Sovereign state: United Kingdom
- Post town: CHELMSFORD
- Postcode district: CM1
- Dialling code: 01245
- Police: Essex
- Fire: Essex
- Ambulance: East of England

Chignall Smealy or Chignal Smealey is a small village in the civil parish of Chignall in the Chelmsford district of Essex, England. It lies 4 miles (6 km) north-west of the centre of Chelmsford.

== Toponymy ==
The meaning of Chignall is uncertain. The second syllable indicates "nook of land", indicating perhaps an area of dry land in a marsh, or an area otherwise separated from its parent territory. The first syllable may come from a personal name "Cicca", or alternatively it may come from "chicken". Smealy means "smooth clearing".

The legal name of the parish uses the spelling "Chignall", which is therefore used on Ordnance Survey maps and by the Office for National Statistics. The Ordnance Survey also uses the spelling "Smealy" in the village's name. The Royal Mail uses the spelling "Chignal Smealey". The parish council uses the spelling Chignal on its website.

== History ==
In Saxon times, Chignall appears to have been a single vill. It was recorded in the Domesday Book of 1086 as Cingehala in the Chelmsford hundred of Essex. The vill was at that time split between two owners.

A priest is mentioned in one of the Domesday entries for Chignall, implying it may have then been a parish. It is unclear where the church was at that time. The church of St James at Chignall St James dates back to at least the 13th century. The church of St Nicholas at Chignall Smealy is a red-brick building built in the early 16th century, with an octagonal font built of brick. A third church dedicated to St Mary is known to have formerly existed at Chignall, which had been demolished by the 18th century. The area came to be administered as the two parishes of Chignall St James and Chignall Smealy, with the latter sometimes called "Little Chignall".

Chignall Smealy and Chignall St James were merged into a new civil parish called Chignall in 1888, although they remained separate ecclesiastical parishes. At the 1881 census (the last before the abolition of the civil parish), Chignall Smealy had a population of 134.

In ecclesiastical terms, Chignall Smealy, Chignall St James, and the neighbouring parish of Mashbury were united into a single benefice in 1930. They were later formally united into a single ecclesiastical parish called "The Chignals with Mashbury", which uses St Nicholas's Church at Chignall Smealy as its parish church.

The village was struck by an F1/T2 tornado on 23 November 1981, as part of the record-breaking nationwide tornado outbreak on that day.

== The village ==
Chignall Smealy has a number of different clubs and groups including: Bowls Club, Chignal 4 Art, Cricket Club, Gardening Club, Wine Discovery, Women's Institute.

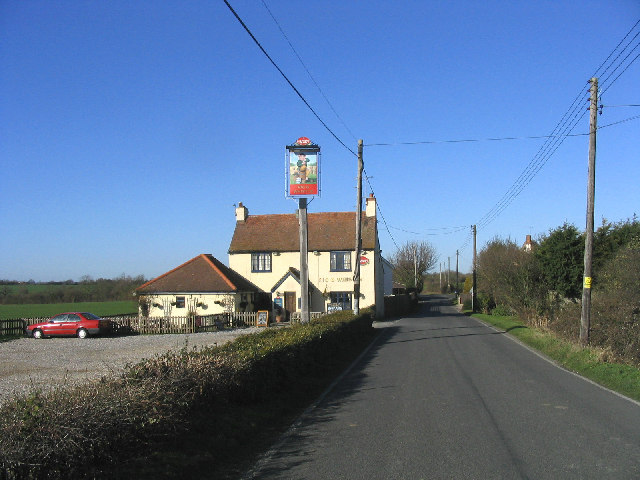
The Pig and Whistle

The Pig and Whistle is a traditional rural village pub, dating back to the mid-19th century
