= 2023 Chelmsford City Council election =

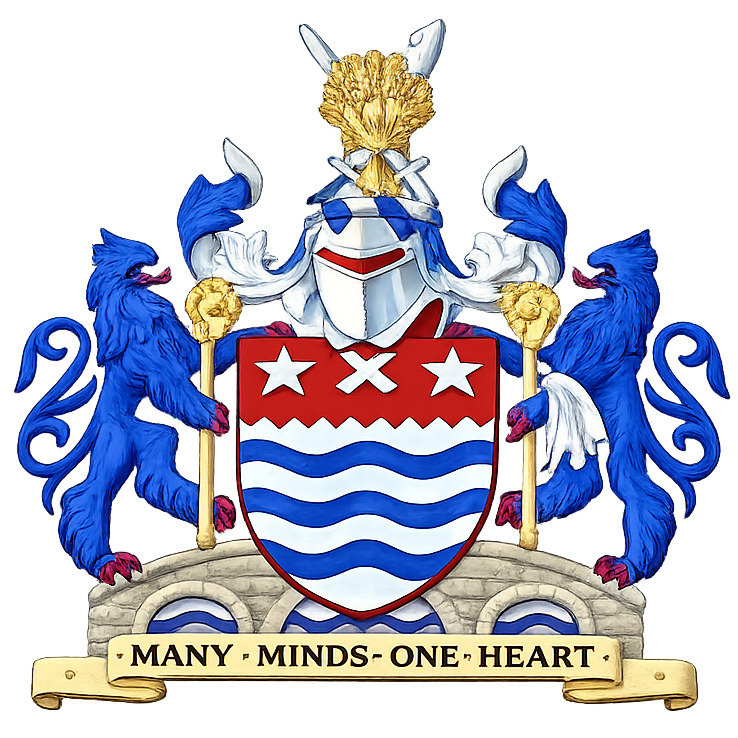
- 4 May 2023

All 57 seats to Chelmsford City Council 29 seats needed for a majority
	First party	Second party
Leader	Stephen Robinson	Roy Whitehead
Party	Liberal Democrats	Conservative
Last election	31 seats, 39.8%	21 seats, 40.5%
Seats before	30 (Note: Including one vacancy in Goat Hall ward previously held by Liberal Democrat councillor Tom Willis until his death in February 2023.)	22 (Note: Including one vacancy in Boreham and the Leighs ward previously held by Conservative councillor John Galley until his death in October 2022.)
Seats after	33	21
Seat change	▲2	Steady
Popular vote	39,567	37,771
Percentage	41.7%	39.8%
Swing	▲1.9%	▼0.7%
	Third party	Fourth party
Leader	Richard Hyland	Ian Roberts
Party	Independent	SWFCTA
Last election	3 seats, 4.3%	2 seats, 2.4%
Seats before	3	2
Seats after	3	0
Seat change	Steady	▼2
Popular vote	4,111	2,003
Percentage	4.3%	2.1%
Swing	0.0%	▼0.3%
- Winner of each seat at the 2023 Chelmsford City Council election
Leader before election
Stephen Robinson
Liberal Democrats
Leader after election
Stephen Robinson
Liberal Democrats

The 2023 Chelmsford City Council election took place on 4 May 2023 to elect members of Chelmsford City Council in Essex, England. This was on the same day as other local elections across England.

The Liberal Democrats retained their majority on the council.

== Overview ==
The Liberal Democrats went into the election holding a majority of the council's seats, having taken control from the Conservatives at the previous election in 2019. At the 2023 election the Liberal Democrats increased their majority, making a net gain of two extra seats at the expense of local party the South Woodham Ferrers Council Taxpayers Association, which lost both of the seats it had held on the council.

A new record was set for the youngest person ever to serve on the council with the election of 22-year-old Liberal Democrat candidate Kieron Franks in the Great Baddow East ward.

=== Election result ===
The overall results were:

2023 Chelmsford City Council election
Party	Candidates	Seats	Gains	Losses	Net gain/loss	Seats %	Votes %	Votes	+/−
Liberal Democrats	57	33	3	1	▲2	57.9	41.7	39,567	+1.9
Conservative	51	21	1	1	Steady	36.8	39.8	37,771	–0.7
Independent	9	3	0	0	Steady	5.3	4.3	4,111	0.0
Labour	37	0	0	0	Steady	0.0	9.2	8,737	+2.5
Green	10	0	0	0	Steady	0.0	2.6	2,445	–2.5
South Woodham Ferrers Council Taxpayers Association	4	0	0	2	▼2	0.0	2.1	2,003	–0.3
UKIP	1	0	0	0	Steady	0.0			
Heritage	1	0	0	0	Steady	0.0	0.2	193	N/A
TUSC	1	0	0	0	Steady	0.0	0.1	85	N/A

Independent Network candidates are included with the independents in the summary above, but candidates who stood under that banner are recorded as such in the detailed ward results below.

== Ward results ==
The Statement of Persons Nominated, which details the candidates standing in each ward, was released by Chelmsford City Council following the close of nominations on 5 April 2023. The ward results were as follows, with sitting councillors standing in their previous wards marked with asterisks(*) and sitting councillors standing in different wards marked with double daggers(‡):

=== Bicknacre and East and West Hanningfield ===
Bicknacre and East and West Hanningfield (2 seats)
Party	Candidate	Votes	%	±%
Conservative	Sue Dobson*	777	67.9	±0.0
Conservative	Mark Taylor	740	64.7	–10.9
Liberal Democrats	Amanda Wilson	279	24.4	–6.0
Liberal Democrats	Robin Stevens	258	22.5	–3.7
Labour	Maria Blakemore	235	20.5	N/A
Turnout			25.74	–2.3
Rejected ballots		6	0.6	
Registered electors		4,010		
Conservative hold				
Conservative hold				

=== Boreham and the Leighs ===
Boreham and the Leighs (2 seats)
Party	Candidate	Votes	%	±%
Conservative	James Raven*	697	61.5	–0.4
Conservative	Victoria Canning	669	59.0	–15.9
Liberal Democrats	Terence Beckett	366	32.3	+7.6
Liberal Democrats	Jyothi Kurra	317	28.0	+7.9
Labour	John Devane	219	19.3	+1.0
Turnout			25.98	–2.6
Rejected ballots		12	0.9	
Registered electors		4,930		
Conservative hold				
Conservative hold				

=== Broomfield and the Walthams ===
Broomfield and the Walthams (3 seats)
Party	Candidate	Votes	%	±%
Conservative	Mike Steel*	1,148	47.0	+8.4
Conservative	Philip Wilson	889	36.4	+2.8
Liberal Democrats	Nicola Bugbee	870	35.6	+18.1
Liberal Democrats	Darren Johnson	850	34.8	+17.7
Conservative	Colin Todd	841	34.4	–0.6
Liberal Democrats	Tayo Udoh	716	29.3	N/A
Independent	Wendy Daden*	691	28.3	–31.8
Labour	Kuldeep Golla	357	14.6	–5.4
Labour	Peter Dixon	342	14.0	N/A
Green	Mike Thompson	333	13.6	–16.4
Labour	David Howell	295	12.1	N/A
Turnout			34.32	
Rejected ballots		7	0.3	
Registered electors		7,979		
Conservative gain from Independent				
Conservative hold				
Liberal Democrats gain from Conservative				

=== Chelmer Village and Beaulieu Park ===
Chelmer Village and Beaulieu Park (3 seats)
Party	Candidate	Votes	%	±%
Liberal Democrats	Rose Moore*	1,177	49.1	–2.3
Liberal Democrats	Steve Hall	1,092	45.6	+1.6
Conservative	Susan Sullivan	1,083	45.2	±0.0
Conservative	Sunil Gupta	1,026	42.8	+1.2
Conservative	Geoff Walker	1,025	42.8	+1.8
Liberal Democrats	Daniel Jeffreys	1,025	42.8	+0.6
Labour	Louis Dearmer	304	12.7	+2.2
Labour	David Sweeney	262	10.9	+0.5
Heritage	Eloise Schultz	193	8.1	N/A
Turnout			33.09	+2.2
Rejected ballots		4	0.2	
Registered electors		7,760		
Liberal Democrats hold				
Liberal Democrats hold				
Conservative hold				

=== Chelmsford Rural West ===
Chelmsford Rural West (1 seat)
Party	Candidate	Votes	%	±%
Conservative	Nicolette Chambers*	573	69.3	–6.7
Liberal Democrats	Olly Fenwick	135	16.3	–7.7
Labour	Steve Maclean	119	14.4	+14.4
Turnout			34.40	+1.4
Rejected ballots		13	1.5	
Registered electors		2,442		
Conservative hold				

=== Galleywood ===
Galleywood (2 seats)
Party	Candidate	Votes	%	±%
Conservative	Janette Potter*	740	57.9	+1.3
Ind. Network	Richard Hyland*	552	43.2	–3.2
Conservative	Alan Chambers	530	41.5	–2.9
Liberal Democrats	Ian Gale	213	16.7	–5.5
Liberal Democrats	Kenneth Hay	180	14.1	–3.4
Labour	Robert Croft	179	14.0	+1.1
Labour	Alan Haines	162	12.7	N/A
Turnout			33.61	+1.5
Rejected ballots		1	0.1	
Registered electors		4,168		
Conservative hold				
Ind. Network hold				

=== Goat Hall ===
Goat Hall (2 seats)
Party	Candidate	Votes	%	±%
Liberal Democrats	Linda Mascot*	845	56.0	–9.8
Liberal Democrats	Hazel Clark	790	52.4	–4.5
Conservative	Christine Garrett	529	35.1	+0.7
Conservative	Yvonne Spence	480	31.8	–1.3
Labour	Joy Chandler	145	9.6	–0.2
Green	Jeremy Crook	122	8.1	N/A
Labour	Thomas Medici	105	7.0	N/A
Turnout			35.32	+1.4
Rejected ballots		11	0.7	
Registered electors		4,505		
Liberal Democrats hold				
Liberal Democrats hold				

=== Great Baddow East ===
Great Baddow East (3 seats)
Party	Candidate	Votes	%	±%
Liberal Democrats	Kieron Franks	871	50.5	–3.2
Liberal Democrats	Pete Davey	869	50.4	+7.9
Liberal Democrats	Andrew Sosin*	829	48.1	–0.7
Conservative	Anthony McQuiggan	671	38.9	+12.5
Conservative	Carol Spingthorpe	617	35.8	+9.6
Ind. Network	Mary Cordeiro	534	31.0	N/A
Green	Lynne Wye	327	19.0	N/A
Labour	Nicola Hesper	275	16.0	+8.1
UKIP	Nigel Carter	178	10.3	N/A
Turnout			34.01	–5.5
Rejected ballots		7	0.3	
Registered electors		6,284		
Liberal Democrats hold				
Liberal Democrats hold				
Liberal Democrats hold				

=== Great Baddow West ===
Great Baddow West (2 seats)
Party	Candidate	Votes	%	±%
Liberal Democrats	Sue Young*	702	60.4	+10.6
Liberal Democrats	Jannetta Sosin*	637	54.8	+8.4
Conservative	Renga Subramanian	512	44.0	+1.2
Ind. Network	Andy Graham	309	26.6	N/A
Labour	Jessica Peacock	166	14.3	+4.1
Turnout			31.8	+0.5
Registered electors		4,496		
Liberal Democrats hold				
Liberal Democrats hold				

=== Little Baddow, Danbury and Sandon ===
Little Baddow, Danbury and Sandon (3 seats)
Party	Candidate	Votes	%	±%
Conservative	Steph Scott	1,499	72.7	+0.1
Conservative	Jacob Armstrong	1,466	71.1	–1.0
Conservative	Julia Jeapes	1,432	69.4	+7.0
Liberal Democrats	Sue Baker	508	24.6	–3.5
Liberal Democrats	David Whiteing	455	22.1	–0.6
Liberal Democrats	Annette Longford	421	20.4	+0.4
Labour	Stephen Capper	205	9.9	N/A
Labour	Conor Hicks	202	9.8	N/A
Turnout			35.14	+0.7
Rejected ballots		11	0.5	
Registered electors		6,341		
Conservative hold				
Conservative hold				
Conservative hold				

=== Marconi ===
Marconi (2 seats)
Party	Candidate	Votes	%	±%
Liberal Democrats	Jude Deakin*	771	60.8	+9.7
Liberal Democrats	Smita Rajesh*	631	49.8	+5.9
Conservative	John Scott	283	22.3	–5.4
Labour	Paul Bishop	273	21.5	–5.7
Green	Ronnie Bartlett	192	15.1	N/A
Labour	Jonathan Legg	177	14.0	–9.6
Ind. Network	Kevin Daines	124	9.8	N/A
TUSC	Tony O'Donnell	85	6.7	N/A
Turnout			25.42	–1.8
Rejected ballots		3	0.2	
Registered electors		5,495		
Liberal Democrats hold				
Liberal Democrats hold				

=== Moulsham and Central ===
Moulsham and Central (3 seats)
Party	Candidate	Votes	%	±%
Liberal Democrats	Marie Goldman*	1,737	58.8	+8.1
Liberal Democrats	Charlene Adutwim	1,491	50.5	+5.8
Liberal Democrats	Graham Pooley*	1,392	47.1	+6.6
Conservative	Kim Gisby	914	30.9	–6.4
Conservative	Liz Hall	903	30.6	–5.3
Conservative	Seena Shah	871	29.5	–2.9
Green	Sally Kershaw	474	16.0	–2.1
Labour	Philip Etheridge	385	13.0	–2.7
Labour	Edward Massey	368	12.5	–2.0
Labour	Richard Parry	330	11.2	–1.3
Turnout			34.28	–2.5
Rejected ballots		13	0.4	
Registered electors		9,180		
Liberal Democrats hold				
Liberal Democrats hold				
Liberal Democrats hold				

=== Moulsham Lodge ===
Moulsham Lodge (2 seats)
Party	Candidate	Votes	%	±%
Liberal Democrats	Simon Goldman	742	47.9	–16.1
Liberal Democrats	Ashley Thompson	691	44.7	–13.4
Conservative	Robert Gisby*	676	43.7	+14.8
Conservative	Jake Smith	625	40.4	+16.2
Labour	Tim Wright	188	12.1	+3.3
Green	Claire Young	173	11.2	–4.8
Turnout			32.32	–6.7
Rejected ballots		4	0.3	
Registered electors		4,233		
Liberal Democrats hold				
Liberal Democrats hold				

Both Moulsham Lodge seats had been won by Liberal Democrats in 2019, but Robert Gisby had won one of the seats for the Conservatives in a by-election in May 2021. He stood for re-election but was defeated. Seat recorded as a Liberal Democrat hold to allow for comparison with 2019 election.

=== Patching Hall ===
Patching Hall (3 seats)
Party	Candidate	Votes	%	±%
Liberal Democrats	Chris Davidson*	1,104	59.1	+7.6
Liberal Democrats	Lynne Foster	1,076	57.6	+3.1
Conservative	Vetri Pappa	984	52.6	+16.2
Conservative	Mike Holoway	926	49.5	+14.2
Liberal Democrats	Sean Manley	821	43.9	–4.3
Green	Angela Thompson	361	19.3	+7.0
Labour	Adam Kenningham–Brown	336	18.0	+8.0
Turnout			35.02	–1.7
Rejected ballots		7	0.3	
Registered electors		6,522		
Liberal Democrats hold				
Liberal Democrats hold				
Conservative gain from Liberal Democrats				

=== Rettendon and Runwell ===
Rettendon and Runwell (2 seats)
Party	Candidate	Votes	%	±%
Independent	Paul Clark*	800	55.7	–8.7
Independent	Steve Davis	729	50.8	N/A
Conservative	Jim Knight	545	38.0	–18.7
Conservative	Dave Phillips	534	37.2	–18.9
Labour	Yvonne Waterhouse	142	9.9	N/A
Liberal Democrats	Jenifer Goldfinch	73	5.1	–17.8
Liberal Democrats	Richard Pennicard	48	3.3	N/A
Turnout			30.21	–5.4
Rejected ballots		1	0.1	
Registered electors		4,958		
Independent hold				
Independent gain from Conservative				

=== South Hanningfield, Stock and Margaretting ===
South Hanningfield, Stock and Margaretting (2 seats)
Party	Candidate	Votes	%	±%
Conservative	Ian Grundy*	1,000	79.9	–1.0
Conservative	Roy Whitehead*	938	75.0	+1.5
Liberal Democrats	Gerhard Petri	221	17.7	–6.8
Liberal Democrats	Maike Windhorst	205	16.4	–4.6
Labour	Mark Reilly	139	11.1	N/A
Turnout			31.8	–3.8
Registered electors		4,362		
Conservative hold				
Conservative hold				

=== South Woodham Ferrers – Chetwood and Collingwood ===
South Woodham Ferrers – Chetwood and Collingwood (3 seats)
Party	Candidate	Votes	%	±%
Conservative	Bob Massey*	708	57.8	+2.7
Conservative	Malcolm Sismey*	656	53.6	+3.6
Conservative	Ashley John*	534	43.6	–5.2
SWFCTA	Jackie Birch	527	43.1	±0.0
SWFCTA	Scott Wilson	495	40.4	N/A
Labour	Jonathan Gatenby	218	17.8	N/A
Liberal Democrats	Amanda Powling	205	16.7	+0.1
Liberal Democrats	Ian Powling	170	13.9	N/A
Liberal Democrats	Mary Regnier–Wilson	159	13.0	N/A
Turnout			23.67	±0.0
Rejected ballots		4	0.3	
Registered electors		5,886		
Conservative hold				
Conservative hold				
Conservative hold				

=== South Woodham Ferrers – Elmwood and Woodville ===
South Woodham Ferrers – Elmwood and Woodville (3 seats)
Party	Candidate	Votes	%	±%
Liberal Democrats	Donna Eley	618	49.9	+28.2
Liberal Democrats	Terry Sherlock	582	47.0	N/A
Conservative	Murrough O'Brien	527	42.5	+17.2
SWFCTA	Keith Bentley*	518	41.8	–11.6
SWFCTA	Ian Roberts*	463	37.4	–14.1
Liberal Democrats	Dee Davey	435	35.1	N/A
Conservative	Scott Wilson	396	32.0	+7.8
Labour	Anthony Weaver	179	14.4	N/A
Turnout			24.92	+0.9
Rejected ballots		4	0.3	
Registered electors		5,842		
Liberal Democrats gain from SWFCTA				
Liberal Democrats gain from SWFCTA				
Conservative hold				

=== Springfield North ===
Springfield North (3 seats)
Party	Candidate	Votes	%	±%
Liberal Democrats	Dan Clark‡	943	44.9	–12.5
Liberal Democrats	Ian Fuller*	925	44.0	–13.4
Liberal Democrats	Chloe Tron*	897	42.7	–8.7
Conservative	Paul Hutchinson	893	42.5	+5.5
Conservative	Emmanuel Aluko	781	37.2	+5.0
Conservative	John Pioli	767	36.5	+8.6
Ind. Network	Martin Lovett	245	11.7	N/A
Labour	Steven Haigh	236	11.2	+0.3
Labour	Karen Kennedy	222	10.6	N/A
Labour	Russell Kennedy	210	10.0	N/A
Green	Reza Hossain	187	8.9	–7.7
Turnout			30.62	–1.6
Rejected ballots		5	0.2	
Registered electors		7,493		
Liberal Democrats hold				
Liberal Democrats hold				
Liberal Democrats hold				

‡Dan Clark was a sitting councillor for Chelmer Village and Beaulieu Park ward before the election.

=== St. Andrew's ===
St. Andrew's (3 seats)
Party	Candidate	Votes	%	±%
Liberal Democrats	Ann Davidson*	1,161	70.9	+11.8
Liberal Democrats	Stephen Robinson*	1,155	70.5	+8.3
Liberal Democrats	Joanne Hawkins	1,104	67.4	+6.7
Conservative	Peter Cousins	555	33.9	+7.6
Conservative	Chloe Ahmed	398	24.3	+0.6
Labour	Megan Francis	297	18.1	+2.7
Labour	Mark Thornley	246	15.0	–0.4
Turnout			30.04	
Rejected ballots		15	0.8	
Registered electors		6,391		
Liberal Democrats hold				
Liberal Democrats hold				
Liberal Democrats hold				

=== The Lawns ===
The Lawns (2 seats)
Party	Candidate	Votes	%	±%
Liberal Democrats	Richard Lee*	854	53.0	–3.4
Liberal Democrats	Natacha Dudley*	821	50.9	–6.6
Conservative	Joel Alderman	581	36.0	–3.8
Conservative	Jane Edwards	555	34.4	–3.5
Labour	Diane McDermott	169	10.5	+2.2
Ind. Network	Beata Chadwick	127	7.9	N/A
Green	Luke Wotton	118	7.3	N/A
Turnout			41.46	–1.4
Rejected ballots		1	0.1	
Registered electors		4,079		
Liberal Democrats hold				
Liberal Democrats hold				

=== Trinity ===
Trinity (2 seats)
Party	Candidate	Votes	%	±%
Liberal Democrats	Julia Frascona*	889	59.1	+13.5
Liberal Democrats	Eleanor Sampson‡	809	53.8	+5.8
Conservative	Bob Adams	564	37.5	+11.3
Conservative	David Kimberlin	543	36.1	+12.1
Labour	Sarah Jones	205	13.6	+6.4
Turnout			36.7	–0.2
Rejected ballots		13	0.8	
Registered electors		4,439		
Liberal Democrats hold				
Liberal Democrats hold				

‡Eleanor Sampson was a sitting councillor for Waterhouse Farm ward before the election.

=== Waterhouse Farm ===
Waterhouse Farm (2 seats)
Party	Candidate	Votes	%	±%
Liberal Democrats	Jennie Lardge*	732	49.5	–16.1
Liberal Democrats	Nora Walsh‡	641	43.3	–18.2
Labour	Penny Richards	494	33.4	+15.5
Labour	Pankaj Sharma	467	31.6	N/A
Conservative	Brian Jeapes	337	22.8	–5.4
Conservative	Gilbert Smith	288	19.5	–7.3
Turnout			34.65	+1.9
Rejected ballots		8	0.5	
Registered electors		4,502		
Liberal Democrats hold				
Liberal Democrats hold				

‡Nora Walsh was a sitting councillor for Great Baddow East ward before the election.

=== Writtle ===
Writtle (2 seats)
Party	Candidate	Votes	%	±%
Conservative	Andrew Thorpe–Apps*	796	54.5	+0.2
Conservative	Barry Knight‡	749	51.3	–16.7
Liberal Democrats	David Loxton	552	37.8	–6.3
Liberal Democrats	Sanjeev Valdaya	507	34.7	+1.1
Green	Robert Jordan	158	10.8	N/A
Labour	Sandra Massey	157	10.8	N/A
Turnout			24.95	–7.6
Rejected ballots		7	0.7	
Registered electors		3,839		
Conservative hold				
Conservative hold				

‡Barry Knight was a sitting councillor for Broomfield and the Walthams ward before the election.

== Changes 2023–2027 ==
- In November 2023, Conservative councillors Mark Taylor (Bicknacre and East and West Hanningfield) and Barry Knight (Writtle) left the party to sit as independents.
- In October 2024, Conservative councillor Ian Grundy died in South Hanningfield, Stock and Margaretting ward, triggering a by-election.
- In March 2025, Liberal Democrat councillors Marie Goldman and Graham Pooley both resigned their Moulsham and Central seats; Goldman had been elected Member of Parliament for Chelmsford, triggering a by-election for both seats.
- In September 2025, Independent councillor Paul Clark (Rettendon and Runwell), a member of the Chelmsford Independents Group, joined Reform UK.
- In October 2025, Liberal Democrat councillor Jude Deakin (Marconi) left the party to sit as an independent.
- In March 2026, Conservative councillor Jacob Armstrong (Little Baddow, Danbury and Sandon) joined Reform UK.
- In March 2026, Liberal Democrat councillor Nicola Bugbee resigned her Broomfield and The Walthams seat, triggering a by-election.

=== By-elections ===
==== South Hanningfield, Stock and Margaretting ====
The by-election was triggered by the death of Conservative councillor Ian Grundy.

South Hanningfield, Stock and Margaretting by-election: 12 December 2024
Party	Candidate	Votes	%	±%
Conservative	Gillian Bonnett	838	81.3	N/A
Green	Edward Massey	75	7.3	N/A
Liberal Democrats	Christine Shaw	70	6.8	N/A
Labour	Stephen Capper	48	4.7	N/A
Majority		763	74.0	N/A
Turnout			24	
Conservative hold		Swing		

==== Moulsham & Central ====
The by-election for both seats was triggered by the resignations of Liberal Democrat councillors Marie Goldman, who had been elected Member of Parliament for Chelmsford, and Graham Pooley.

Moulsham & Central: 1 May 2025
Party	Candidate	Votes	%	±%
Liberal Democrats	Helen Ayres	1,384	51.9	+2.4
Liberal Democrats	Seán Manley	1,285	48.2	–1.3
Reform	Darren Brooke	572	21.5	N/A
Reform	Simon Lowe	541	20.3	N/A
Conservative	Seena Shah	477	17.9	–8.1
Conservative	Renga Subramanian	411	15.4	–10.6
Green	Ronnie Bartlett	200	7.5	–6.0
Labour	Penny Richards	191	7.2	–3.8
Green	Edward Massey	143	5.4	–8.1
Labour	Oli Winters	128	4.8	–6.2
Turnout		~2,666	27.2	–7.1
Liberal Democrats hold				
Liberal Democrats hold				

==== Broomfield & The Walthams ====
The by-election was triggered by the resignation of Liberal Democrat councillor Nicola Bugbee.

Broomfield & The Walthams by-election: 7 May 2026
Party	Candidate	Votes	%	±%
Conservative	Seena Shah	1,284	32.9	−0.9
Reform	Chris Davy	1,258	32.2	N/A
Liberal Democrats	Rachel Wheelhouse	720	18.4	−7.2
Green	Ben Harvey	477	12.2	+2.4
Labour	David Howell	164	4.2	−6.3
Majority		26	0.7	N/A
Turnout		3,903	44.1	
Conservative gain from Liberal Democrats				
