= Chignall =

Civil parish in Essex, England

Coordinates: 51°45′54″N 0°25′22″E

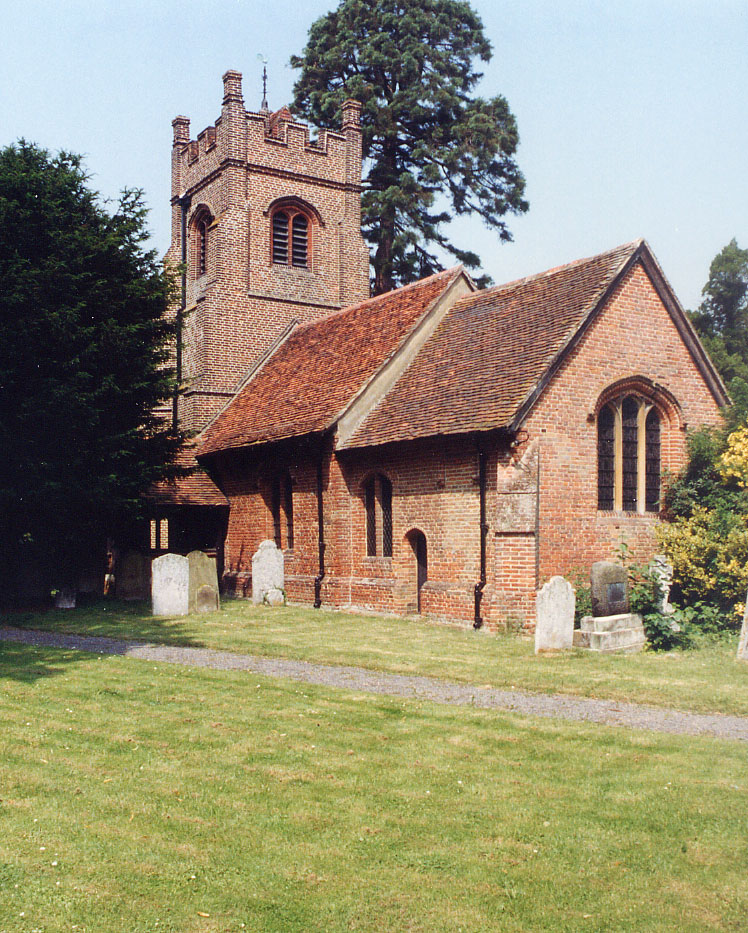
- Church of St Nicholas at Chignall Smealy

- Location within Essex
- Population: 621 (Parish, 2021)
- Civil parish: Chignall
- District: Chelmsford
- Shire county: Essex
- Region: East
- Country: England
- Sovereign state: United Kingdom
- Post town: CHELMSFORD
- Postcode district: CM1
- Dialling code: 01245
- Police: Essex
- Fire: Essex
- Ambulance: East of England
- UK Parliament: Chelmsford

Chignall is a civil parish in the Chelmsford district of Essex, England. The parish includes the two small villages of Chignall St James and Chignall Smealy and surrounding rural areas. In the south-eastern tip of the parish it also includes some recent developments on the edge of the built up area of the city of Chelmsford. At the 2021 census the parish had a population of 621.

== Toponymy ==
The meaning of Chignall is uncertain. The second syllable indicates "nook of land", indicating perhaps an area of dry land in a marsh, or an area otherwise separated from its parent territory. The first syllable may come from a personal name "Cicca", or alternatively it may come from "chicken".

The legal name of the parish uses the spelling "Chignall", which is therefore used on Ordnance Survey maps and by the Office for National Statistics. The Ordnance Survey also uses the spelling "Smealy" in that village's name. The Royal Mail uses the spelling "Chignal" for official postal addresses in both villages, and also uses the spelling "Smealey". The parish council uses the spelling Chignal on its website.

== History ==
In Saxon times, Chignall appears to have been a single vill. It was recorded in the Domesday Book of 1086 as Cingehala in the Chelmsford hundred of Essex. The vill was at that time split between two owners.

A priest is mentioned in one of the Domesday entries for Chignall, implying it may have then been a parish. It is unclear where the church was at that time. The church of St James at Chignall St James dates back to at least the 13th century, and the church of St Nicholas at Chignall Smealy was built in the early 16th century. A third church dedicated to St Mary is known to have formerly existed at Chignall, which had been demolished by the 18th century. The area came to be administered as the two parishes of Chignall St James and Chignall Smealy, with the latter sometimes called "Little Chignall".

Chignall St James and Chignall Smealy were merged into a new civil parish called Chignall in 1888, although they remained separate ecclesiastical parishes.

In ecclesiastical terms, Chignall St James, Chignall Smealy and the neighbouring parish of Mashbury were united into a single benefice in 1930. They were later formally united into a single ecclesiastical parish called "The Chignals with Mashbury", which uses St Nicholas's Church at Chignall Smealy as its parish church. St James's Church was declared redundant in 1981; it was converted into a house a few years later.

== Governance ==
The parish council is based at the village hall on Mashbury Road in Chignall St James.
