= St James' Church, Chignal St James =

Church building in Essex, England

Coordinates: 51.7608°N 0.4178°E

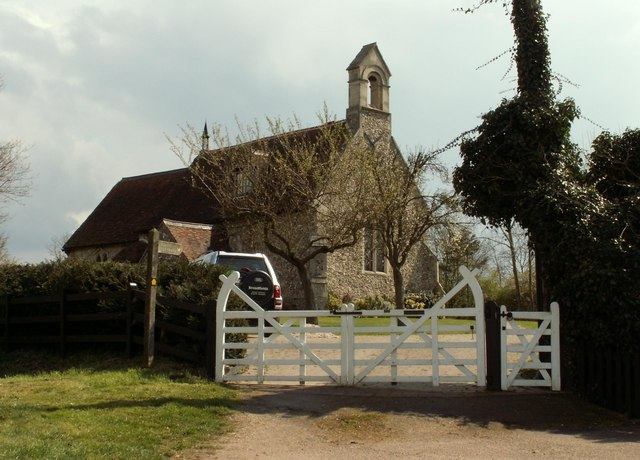
Former parish church of St James

St James' Church, Chignal St James is a former parish church in Chignal St James in Essex, England.

The building has a 13th or 14th century nave with flint rubble walls including some freestone and Roman brick fragments, limestone and brick dressings and a tiled roof. The east and south walls of its chancel seem to have been rebuilt and a stairway to a rood loft added, both in the early 16th century, though the building has never had a chancel arch. It was restored in the 19th century and its north porch is modern.

The church was declared redundant on 18 March 1981. It was converted to a private dwelling in 1989 by Patrick Lorimer. A garage was added in 2008 following an archaeological dig.
