= Woodham Ferrers and Bicknacre =

Civil parish in Essex, England

Coordinates: 51°40′47″N 0°35′37″E

- Location within Essex
- Population: 2,922 (Parish, 2021)
- District: Chelmsford
- Shire county: Essex
- Region: East
- Country: England
- Sovereign state: United Kingdom
- Post town: CHELMSFORD
- Postcode district: CM3
- Dialling code: 01245
- Police: Essex
- Fire: Essex
- Ambulance: East of England
- UK Parliament: Chelmsford

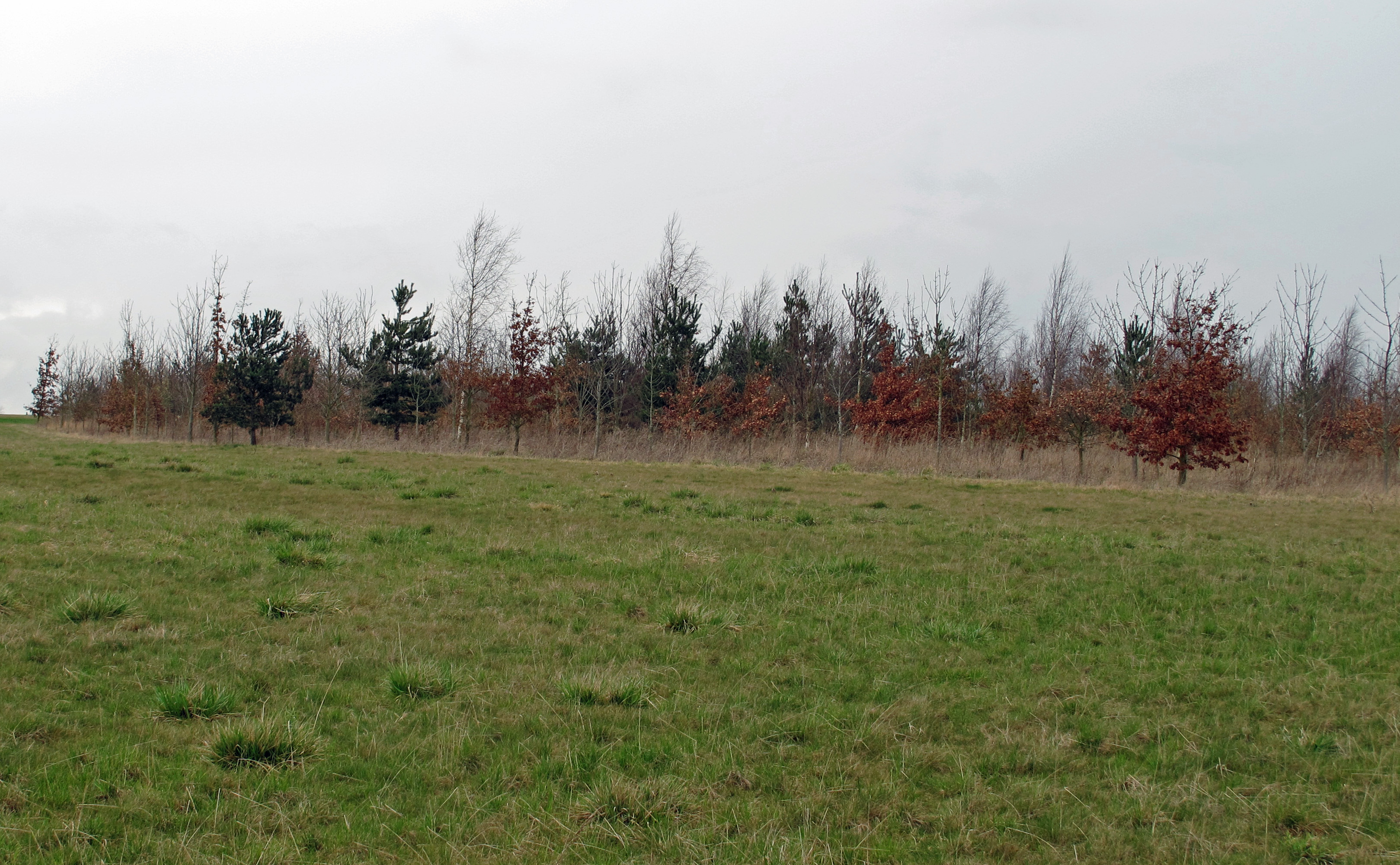

Woodham Ferrers and Bicknacre is a civil parish in the Chelmsford district in Essex, England. The parish includes the villages of Bicknacre and Woodham Ferrers. At the 2021 census the parish had a population of 2,922. The parish adopted its modern name in 1987 when the old parish of Woodham Ferrers was split; the southern part became a separate parish called South Woodham Ferrers and the remainder was renamed Woodham Ferrers and Bicknacre after its two main settlements.

== History ==
Woodham Ferrers was an ancient parish in the Chelmsford hundred of Essex. As well as the village itself, the parish included surrounding rural areas, stretching from Bicknacre in the north down to the River Crouch in the south. When the Southminster branch of the Great Eastern Railway was built it passed through the parish, but 1 mile (1.6 km) south of the village itself, following the flatter land south of the hill on which Woodham Ferrers village stands. Woodham Ferrers railway station opened with the line in 1889 to serve the area. A new settlement grew up around the station, which became known as South Woodham Ferrers. In 1987, a new parish of South Woodham Ferrers was created from the southern part of the old Woodham Ferrers parish, and the remainder was renamed "Woodham Ferrers and Bicknacre".

== Governance ==
There are three tiers of local government covering Woodham Ferrers and Bicknacre, at parish, district, and county level: Woodham Ferrers and Bicknacre Parish Council, Chelmsford City Council, and Essex County Council. The parish council generally meets at the Memorial Hall in Bicknacre.
