= Bicknacre =

Village in Essex, England

Coordinates: 51.6964°N 0.5868°E

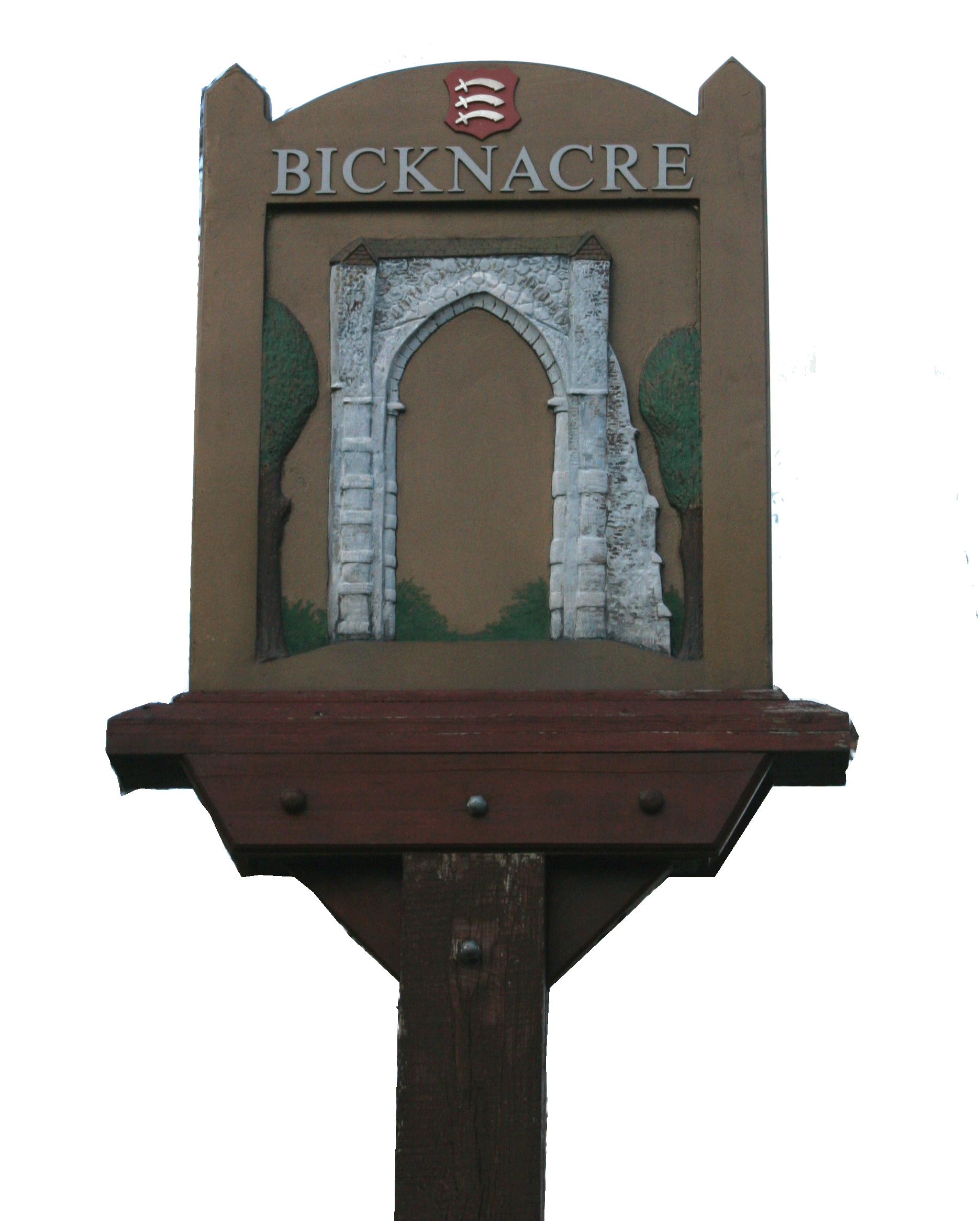
- Bicknacre Village Sign

- Location within Essex
- Area: 0.330 km^{2} (0.127 sq mi)
- Population: 2,263 (2018 estimate)
  - Density: 6,858/km^{2} (17,760/sq mi)
- OS grid reference: TL788029
- Civil parish: Woodham Ferrers and Bicknacre
- District: Chelmsford
- Shire county: Essex
- Region: East
- Country: England
- Sovereign state: United Kingdom
- Post town: CHELMSFORD
- Postcode district: CM3
- Dialling code: 01245
- Police: Essex
- Fire: Essex
- Ambulance: East of England
- UK Parliament: Maldon

Bicknacre is a village in the civil parish of Woodham Ferrers and Bicknacre, in the county of Essex, England. It is approximately 4.0 mi (6.5 km) north of South Woodham Ferrers and 5.7 mi (9.2 km) southeast of the city of Chelmsford. The village is in the borough of Chelmsford and in the parliamentary constituency of Maldon. In 2018 it had an estimated population of 2,263.

== History ==
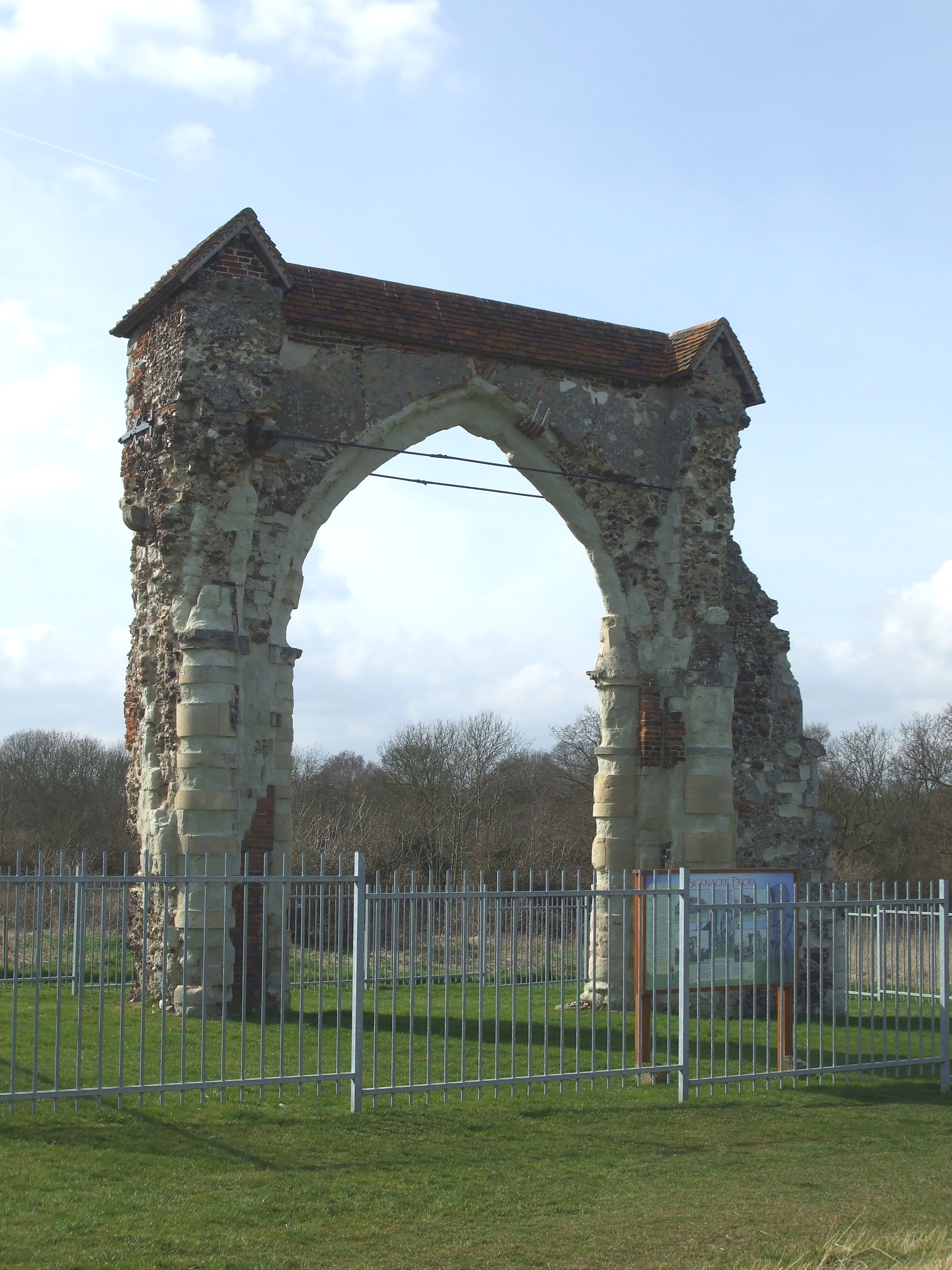
Bicknacre Priory Arch

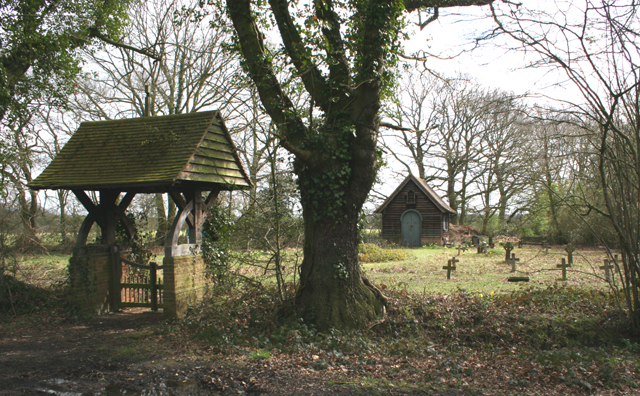
St.Giles Churchyard

There was a hermitage on this site until around the end of 1154, when it was converted into a priory for the Augustinian Canons, also known as the Black Canons. It was known as Wodeham (Woodham) Priory until 1235 when the name Bicknacre first occurs.

The name is derived from Bicca, the landowner, and æcer, an old English word meaning open field from which the word acre is derived.

Despite a very small population for most of its history, the village was able to support four Public Houses. All of these remain although two are now private dwellings.

The first major development was in 1969 with the construction of 60 executive style properties on former farm land to the north of the village. At the same time, a new school and village hall was constructed along with a modest shopping precinct.

In the 1980s, the Thriftwood Estate was built on the southern side of the village comprising 300 homes.

Several attempts have been made to undertake further developments in Bicknacre. Most notably in 2001 when an application to build 4,000 homes on farmland was rejected by Chelmsford City (then Borough) Council. The Parish Council successfully arranged a 100 year lease on this land, handing it over to the local community as a green space.

The Bicknacre Festival was held for four years between 2005 and 2009 raising over £20,000 for local good causes. In 2006, the festival was opened by former Formula One driver and The Stig from BBC's Top Gear Perry McCarthy.

== Landmarks ==
The Priory Arch is all that remains of the priory. It comprises the west arch of the crossing of the church (estimated to date from about 1250) with attached fragments of the nave and north transept.

The arch and the surrounding fields, known as Priory Fields, originally formed part of a large area of land owned by Bicknacre Priory, which dates back to c1150. Part of that land later became known as Priory Farm. The farm was sold in 2001 and 7 acres, including the remaining Priory Arch, were given to the local parish on a 100 year lease and are looked after by a voluntary group, called Friends of Priory Fields.

The St Giles Home for British Lepers no longer exists, but St. Giles Churchyard, which is marked as an Essex Wildlife Trust Nature Reserve is in Moor Hall Lane. It is rumoured that the church is haunted by a man buried in the graveyard. His name remains unknown.

== 2023 Bicknacre earthquake ==
On 9 February 2023, Bicknacre was the epicentre of a small earthquake with a magnitude of 2.6 which was felt as far away as South Woodham Ferrers and Chelmsford.

== Notable people ==
Notable people from the village include Richard Robarts, a former Formula One driver, and the artist Danielle West (now known as Danielle Martin). The artist Grayson Perry spent part of his childhood in the village. The Actor and Comedian Marty Feldman was evacuated to Bicknacre during World War II. Dancer, choreographer, and television personality Ashely Banjo resides in Bicknacre. Rock singer Graham Bonnet lived in Bicknacre during the 1980s

== Film ==
Bicknacre was used as a location for the 2020 feature film Villain, starring Craig Fairbrass and also for an infomercial about road safety starring Joe Thomas

== Images ==
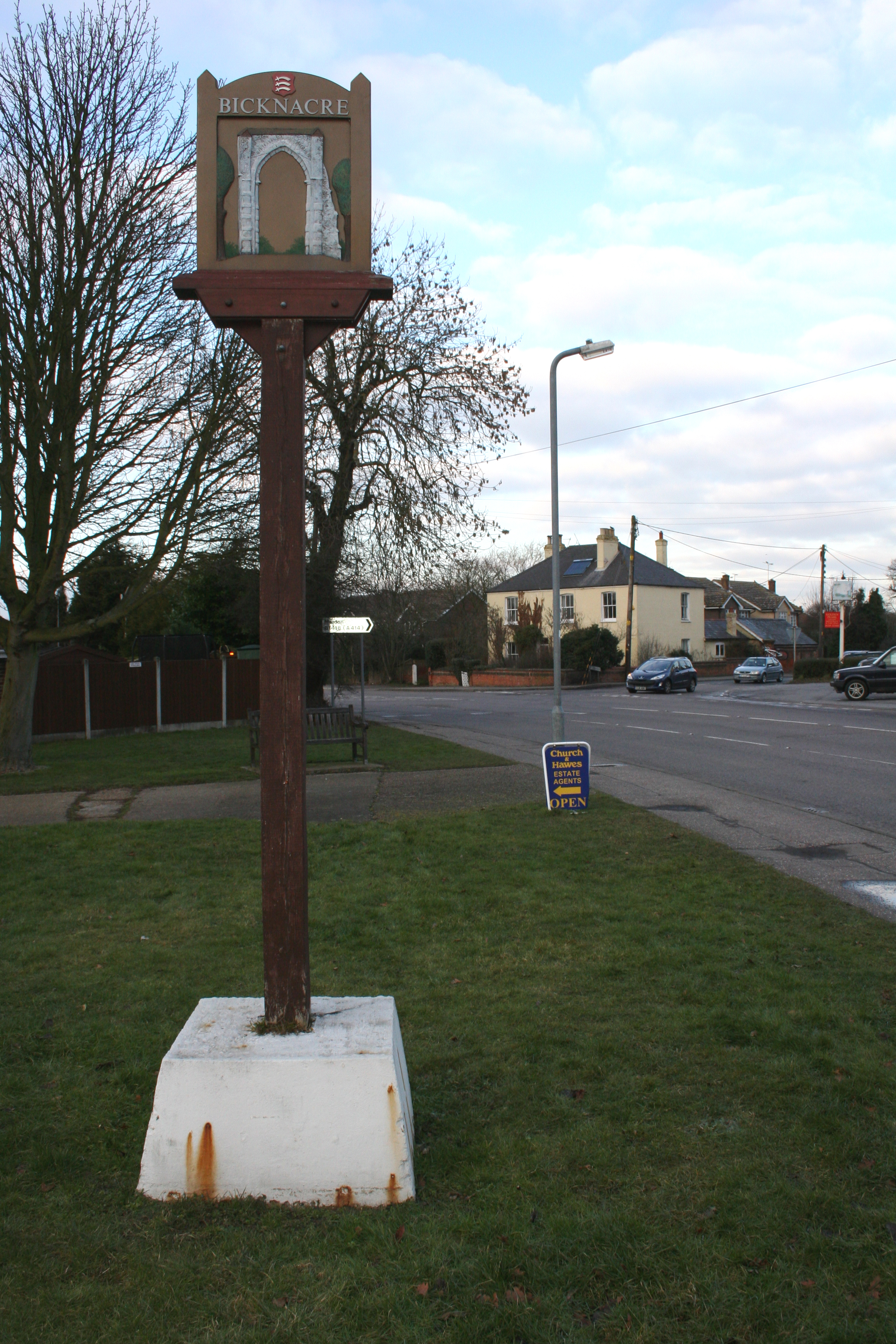
Bicknacre Village Sign

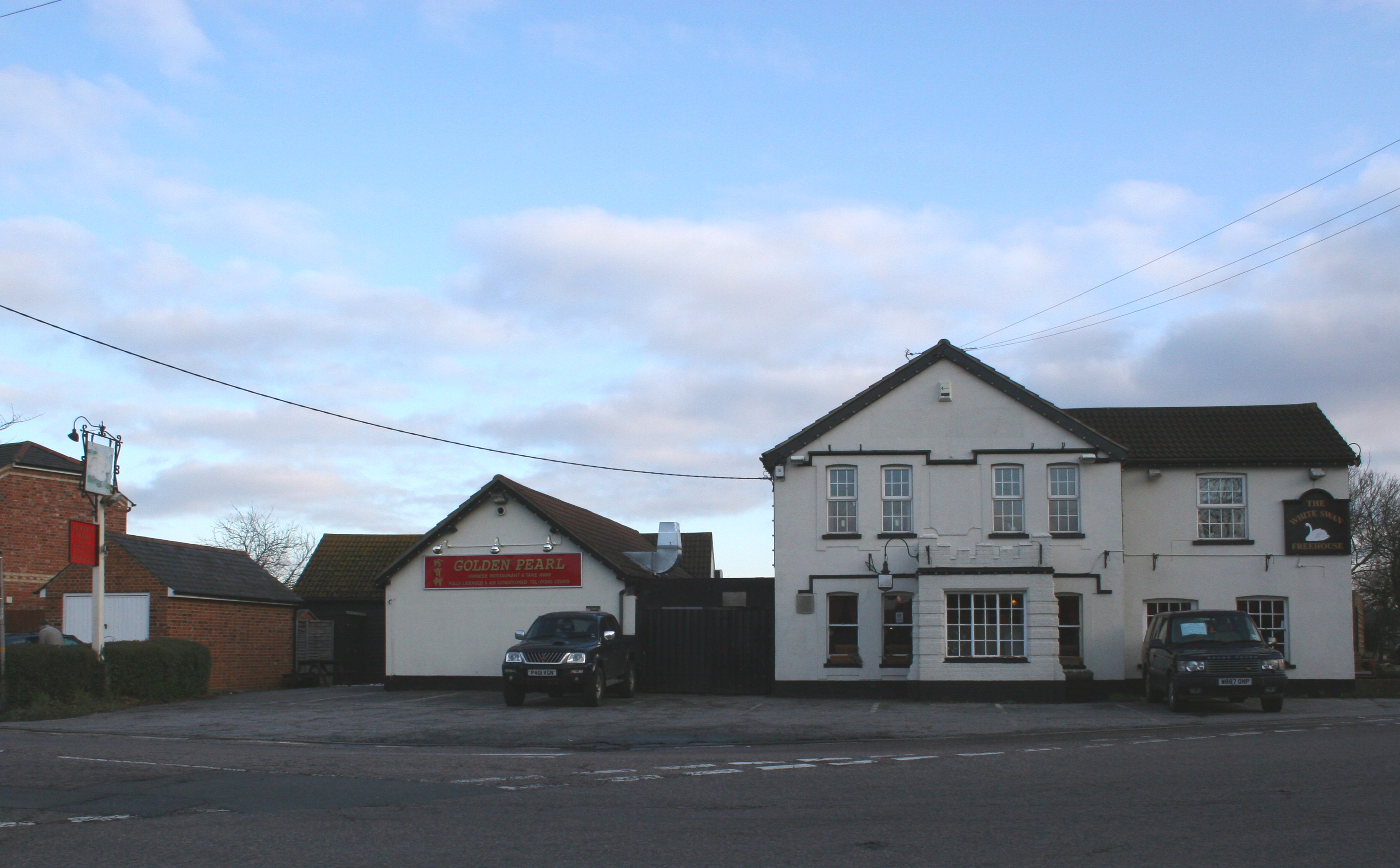
The White Swan Public House

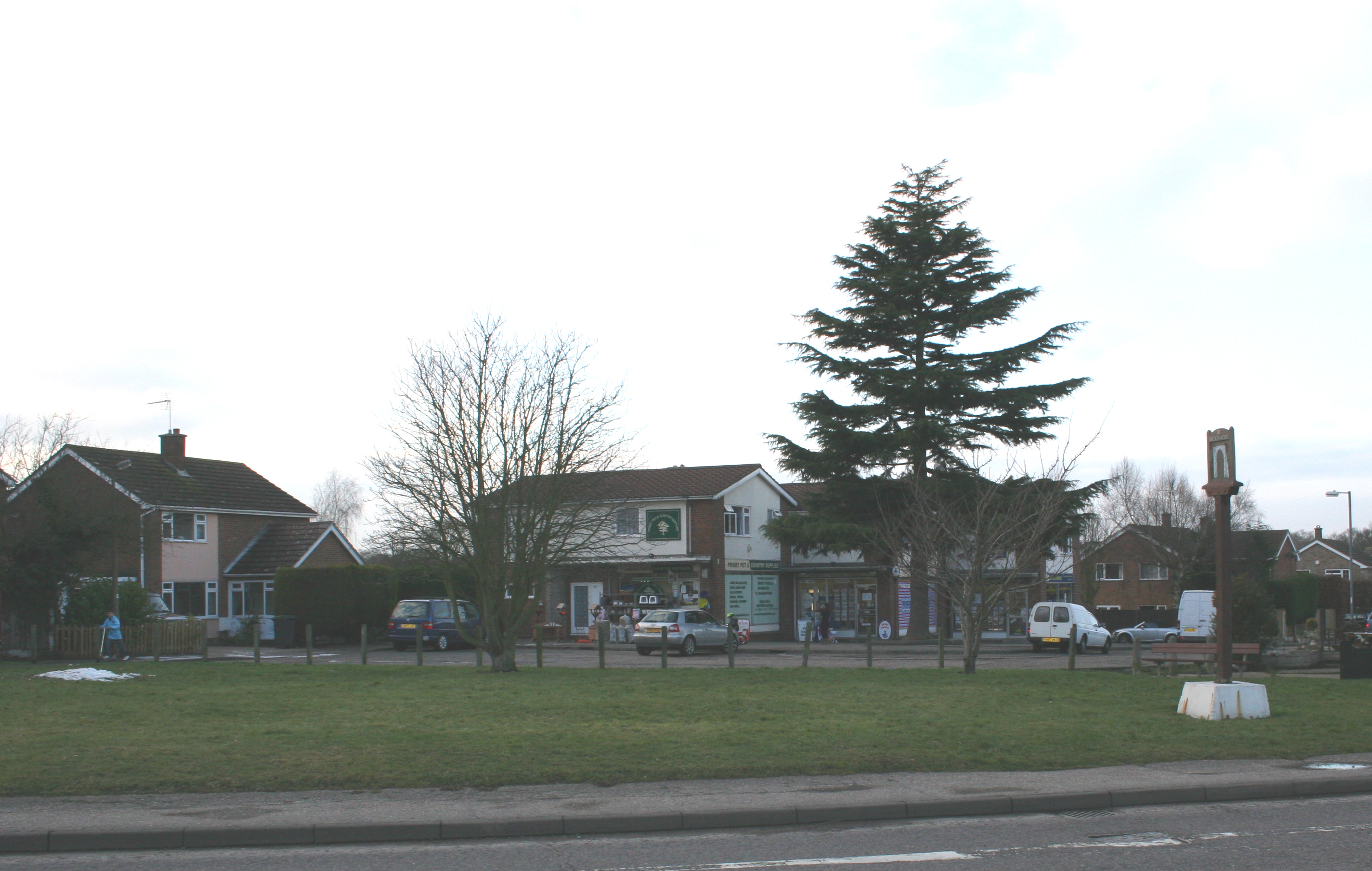
Shops at Bicknacre
