= 2019 Chelmsford City Council election =

2019 UK local government election

- 2 May 2019

All 57 seats to Chelmsford City Council 29 seats needed for a majority
	First party	Second party
Party	Liberal Democrats	Conservative
Last election	5	52
Seats before	5	52
Seats won	31	21
Seat change	▲26	▼31
Popular vote	39,067	39,766
Percentage	39.8%	40.5%
Swing	▲19.4%	▼11.5%
	Third party	Fourth party
Party	Independent	SWFCTA
Last election	0	0
Seats before	0	0
Seats won	3	2
Seat change	▲3	▲2
Popular vote	4,226	2,327
Percentage	4.3%	2.4%
Swing	▲4.0%	▼0.5%

The 2019 Chelmsford City Council election took place on 2 May 2019 to elect members of Chelmsford City Council in England. This was on the same day as other local elections.

== Results summary ==
The Liberal Democrats made their largest gains in the country in Chelmsford, gaining 26 seats. These 26 gains were all to the expense of the Conservatives who lost 31 seats during the elections here. The other five Conservative losses went to three independent and two South Woodham Ferrers Council Taxpayers Association candidates.

2019 Chelmsford City Council election
Party	Candidates	Seats	Gains	Losses	Net gain/loss	Seats %	Votes %	Votes	+/−
Liberal Democrats	51	31	26	0	▲26	54.4	39.8	39,067	+19.4
Conservative	57	21	0	31	▼31	36.8	40.5	39,766	-11.5
Independent	6	3	3	0	▲3	5.3	4.3	4,266	+4.0
South Woodham Ferrers Independents	3	2	2	0	▲2	3.5	2.4	2,327	-0.5
Labour	27	0	0	0	Steady	0.0	6.7	6,537	-5.7
Green	13	0	0	0	Steady	0.0	5.1	5,008	+2.3
UKIP	4	0	0	0	Steady	0.0	1.2	1,223	-7.9

== Ward results ==
Source: Chelmsford City Council website

=== Bicknacre and East and West Hanningfield ===
Bicknacre and East and West Hanningfield (2 seats)
Party	Candidate	Votes	%	±%
Conservative	Richard Poulter	927	75.6	+2.3
Conservative	Sue Dobson	833	67.9	−5.4
Liberal Democrats	Jenni Goldfinch	373	30.4	+21.3
Liberal Democrats	Christian Sant	321	26.2	+19.2
Turnout			33.37	−38.6
Rejected ballots		37	2.7	
Registered electors		4,154		
Conservative hold				
Conservative hold				

=== Boreham and The Leighs ===
Boreham and The Leighs (2 seats)
Party	Candidate	Votes	%	±%
Conservative	John Galley	834	74.9	−17.5
Conservative	James Raven	690	61.9	+6.6
Liberal Democrats	Amanda Wilson	275	24.7	+7.5
Liberal Democrats	Robin Stevens	224	20.1	+4.2
Labour	Kevin Adair	204	18.3	−1.0
Turnout			28.60	−40.4
Rejected ballots		42	3.1	
Registered electors		4,675		
Conservative hold				
Conservative hold				

=== Broomfield and The Walthams ===
Broomfield and The Walthams (3 seats)
Party	Candidate	Votes	%	±%
Independent	Wendy Daden	1,226	60.1	N/A
Conservative	Mike Steel	788	38.6	−12.6
Conservative	Barry Knight	713	35.0	−14.0
Conservative	Philip Wilson	685	33.6	−12.8
Green	Sarah Clark	613	30.0	+19.3
Green	Angela Faulds	529	25.9	+15.8
Green	Annette Swift	452	22.2	N/A
Labour	Dermot Sterne	409	20.0	+3.6
Liberal Democrats	Lyndsey Knox	356	17.5	+4.9
Liberal Democrats	Ken Hay	349	17.1	+5.6
Turnout			35.66	−35.3
Rejected ballots		14	0.6	
Registered electors		7,033		
Independent gain from Conservative				
Conservative hold				
Conservative hold				

=== Chelmer Village and Beaulieu Park ===
Chelmer Village and Beaulieu Park (3 seats)
Party	Candidate	Votes	%	±%
Liberal Democrats	Rose Moore	1,150	51.4	+34.8
Conservative	Neil Gulliver	1,012	45.2	−17.1
Liberal Democrats	Dan Clark	985	44.0	+31.6
Liberal Democrats	Dave Havell	944	42.2	+32.4
Conservative	Susan Sullivan	931	41.6	−25.5
Conservative	Graham Mcghie	918	41.0	−14.8
UKIP	Nigel Carter	305	13.6	−6.3
Labour	Steven Haigh	234	10.5	−6.4
Labour	Harrison Dalby	233	10.4	−5.3
Turnout			30.91	−38.1
Rejected ballots		9	0.4	
Registered electors		8,113		
Liberal Democrats gain from Conservative				
Conservative hold				
Liberal Democrats gain from Conservative				

=== Chelmsford Rural West ===
Chelmsford Rural West (1 seat)
Party	Candidate	Votes	%	±%
Conservative	Nicolette Chambers	626	76.0	−2.1
Liberal Democrats	Oliver Fenwick	198	24.0	+12.7
Majority		428	52.0	−14.8
Turnout		824	36.68	−39.3
Rejected ballots		23	2.7	
Registered electors		2,312		
Conservative hold		Swing	▼7.4	

=== Galleywood ===
Galleywood (2 seats)
Party	Candidate	Votes	%	±%
Conservative	Janette Potter	697	56.6	−14.0
Ind. Network	Richard Hyland	571	46.4	N/A
Conservative	David Stevenson	546	44.4	−2.2
Liberal Democrats	Ben Isherwood	273	22.2	+4.0
Liberal Democrats	Ian Gale	216	17.5	+1.7
Labour	Elizabeth Surrey	159	12.9	−11.2
Turnout			32.11	−38.9
Rejected ballots		11	0.8	
Registered electors		4,382		
Conservative hold				
Ind. Network gain from Conservative				

=== Goat Hall ===
Goat Hall (2 seats)
Party	Candidate	Votes	%	±%
Liberal Democrats	Linda Mascot	947	65.8	+27.4
Liberal Democrats	Tom Willis	819	56.9	+19.9
Conservative	Jane Edwards	496	34.4	+0.2
Conservative	Anthony McQuiggan	476	33.1	−11.6
Labour	Benjamin Poulton	141	9.8	−2.4
Turnout			33.94	−39.1
Rejected ballots		29	1.8	
Registered electors		4,655		
Liberal Democrats gain from Conservative				
Liberal Democrats hold				

=== Great Baddow East ===
Great Baddow East (3 seats)
Party	Candidate	Votes	%	±%
Liberal Democrats	Chris Shaw	1,287	53.7	+17.7
Liberal Democrats	Andrew Sosin	1,169	48.8	+16.1
Liberal Democrats	Nora Walsh	1,018	42.5	+10.2
Conservative	Liz Ahmed	634	26.4	−17.8
Conservative	Stephanie Scott	629	26.2	−15.3
Conservative	Sunil Gupta	531	22.2	−23.1
Independent	Maurice Hyde	536	22.4	N/A
Independent	Angela Hyde	515	21.5	N/A
Independent	Sebastian Bodera	510	21.3	N/A
Labour	Andrew Moir	189	7.9	−6.4
Labour	John Devane	173	7.2	−6.3
Turnout			39.48	−31.5
Rejected ballots		13	0.5	
Registered electors		6,493		
Liberal Democrats gain from Conservative				
Liberal Democrats gain from Conservative				
Liberal Democrats gain from Conservative				

=== Great Baddow West ===
Great Baddow West (2 seats)
Party	Candidate	Votes	%	±%
Liberal Democrats	Sue Young	684	49.8	+30.2
Liberal Democrats	Jannetta Sosin	637	46.4	+26.3
Conservative	Billy Taylor	588	42.8	−11.6
Conservative	Bob Villa	476	34.6	−2.7
UKIP	Mike Parker	222	16.2	−4.9
Labour	Jonathan Legg	140	10.2	−7.8
Turnout			32.25	−32.7
Rejected ballots		10	0.7	
Registered electors		4,751		
Liberal Democrats gain from Conservative				
Liberal Democrats gain from Conservative				

=== Little Baddow, Danbury and Sandon ===
Little Baddow, Danbury and Sandon (3 seats)
Party	Candidate	Votes	%	±%
Conservative	Ian Wright	1,431	72.6	+0.5
Conservative	Bob Shepherd	1,421	72.1	+0.9
Conservative	Richard Ambor	1,230	62.4	−9.9
Liberal Democrats	David Whiteing	553	28.1	+14.7
Liberal Democrats	Edward Longford	447	22.7	+11.6
Green	Colin Budgey	435	22.1	+9.2
Liberal Democrats	Sue Baker	394	20.0	+9.0
Turnout			34.43	−39.6
Rejected ballots		29	1.3	
Registered electors		6,532		
Conservative hold				
Conservative hold				
Conservative hold				

=== Marconi ===
Marconi (2 seats)
Party	Candidate	Votes	%	±%
Liberal Democrats	Jude Deakin	729	51.1	+19.5
Liberal Democrats	Catherine Finnecy	626	43.9	+18.4
Conservative	Yvonne Spence	395	27.7	−3.9
Labour	Paul Bishop	388	27.2	−3.4
Conservative	Ben Mcnally	377	26.4	−4.7
Labour	Penny Richards	337	23.6	−5.7
Turnout			27.21	−29.8
Rejected ballots		22	1.4	
Registered electors		5,605		
Liberal Democrats gain from Conservative				
Liberal Democrats hold				

=== Moulsham and Central ===
Moulsham and Central (3 seats)
Party	Candidate	Votes	%	±%
Liberal Democrats	Marie Goldman	1,424	50.7	+29.7
Liberal Democrats	Jeremy Lager	1,255	44.7	+24.6
Liberal Democrats	Graham Pooley	1,139	40.5	+21.1
Conservative	Ayman Syed	1,047	37.3	−16.7
Conservative	Kim Gisby	1,009	35.9	−14.0
Conservative	Seena Shah	911	32.4	−12.7
Green	Lloyd Williamson	508	18.1	+0.1
Labour	Rita Appleby	442	15.7	−4.0
Labour	Edward Massey	408	14.5	−7.8
Labour	Sean O'Sullivan	352	12.5	N/A
UKIP	John Theedom	284	10.1	−7.6
Turnout			36.75	−31.2
Rejected ballots		12	0.4	
Registered electors		8,703		
Liberal Democrats gain from Conservative				
Liberal Democrats gain from Conservative				
Liberal Democrats gain from Conservative				

=== Moulsham Lodge ===
Moulsham Lodge (2 seats)
Party	Candidate	Votes	%	±%
Liberal Democrats	Mark Springett	997	64.0	+27.7
Liberal Democrats	David Jones	906	58.1	+24.5
Conservative	Simon Cook	450	28.9	−18.3
Conservative	Callum Macconnachie	378	24.2	−8.8
Green	Claire Bone	250	16.0	+8.2
Labour	Elaine Baldwin	137	8.8	−3.0
Turnout			39.03	−33.0
Rejected ballots		20	1.2	
Registered electors		4,303		
Liberal Democrats gain from Conservative				
Liberal Democrats hold				

=== Patching Hall ===
Patching Hall (3 seats)
Party	Candidate	Votes	%	±%
Liberal Democrats	Helen Ayres	1,254	54.5	+15.0
Liberal Democrats	Chris Davidson	1,185	51.5	+15.1
Liberal Democrats	Simon Goldman	1,108	48.2	+15.9
Conservative	Jon De Vries	837	36.4	−7.4
Conservative	Mike Holoway	813	35.3	−3.5
Conservative	Colin Cowie	801	34.8	−0.5
Green	Angela Thomson	284	12.3	N/A
Labour	Joan Bliss	230	10.0	−11.5
Labour	Jennie Duffy	204	8.9	−8.1
Labour	David Howell	188	8.2	−7.8
Turnout			36.71	−30.3
Rejected ballots		24	1.0	
Registered electors		6,740		
Liberal Democrats gain from Conservative				
Liberal Democrats hold				
Liberal Democrats gain from Conservative				

=== Rettendon and Runwell ===
Rettendon and Runwell (2 seats)
Party	Candidate	Votes	%	±%
Independent	Paul Clark	908	64.4	N/A
Conservative	Lance Millane	800	56.7	+1.5
Conservative	Raymond Ride	791	56.1	−0.6
Liberal Democrats	Richard Pennicard	323	22.9	+19.6
Turnout			35.63	−36.4
Rejected ballots		26	1.5	
Registered electors		4,730		
Independent gain from Conservative				
Conservative hold				

=== South Hanningfield, Stock and Margaretting ===
South Hanningfield, Stock and Margaretting (2 seats)
Party	Candidate	Votes	%	±%
Conservative	Ian Grundy	1,070	80.9	+7.9
Conservative	Roy Whitehead	973	73.5	−0.8
Liberal Democrats	Maggie O'Connor	324	24.5	+16.2
Liberal Democrats	Andrew Neville	278	21.0	+14.5
Turnout			32.33	−41.7
Rejected ballots		34	2.3	
Registered electors		4,514		
Conservative hold				
Conservative hold				

=== South Woodham - Chetwood and Collingwood ===
South Woodham - Chetwood and Collingwood (3 seats)
Party	Candidate	Votes	%	±%
Conservative	Bob Massey	667	55.1	−12.5
Conservative	Ashley John	605	50.0	−11.5
Conservative	Malcolm Sismey	591	48.8	−6.9
SWFCTA	John Miller	522	43.1	+13.0
Green	Ian Hammond	392	32.4	N/A
Green	Juliette Rey	349	28.8	N/A
Green	David Rey	304	25.1	+12.2
Liberal Democrats	Amanda Powling	201	16.6	N/A
Turnout			23.66	−40.3
Rejected ballots		11	0.8	
Registered electors		6,159		
Conservative hold				
Conservative hold				
Conservative hold				

=== South Woodham - Elmwood and Woodville ===
South Woodham - Elmwood and Woodville (3 seats)
Party	Candidate	Votes	%	±%
SWFCTA	Keith Bentley	919	53.4	+19.7
SWFCTA	Ian Roberts	886	51.5	+21.5
Conservative	Patricia Hughes	436	25.3	−24.5
Conservative	Bob Denston	417	24.2	−31.5
Conservative	Linda Denston	409	23.8	−28.6
Liberal Democrats	Ian Powling	373	21.7	N/A
Turnout			23.99	−42.0
Rejected ballots		11	0.8	
Registered electors		6,029		
SWFCTA gain from Conservative				
SWFCTA gain from Conservative				
Conservative hold				

=== Springfield North ===
Springfield North (3 seats)
Party	Candidate	Votes	%	±%
Liberal Democrats	Ian Fuller	1,175	57.4	+22.5
Liberal Democrats	Mike Mackrory	1,167	57.0	+21.5
Liberal Democrats	Chloe Tron	1,051	51.4	+23.1
Conservative	Paul Hutchinson	757	37.0	−14.8
Conservative	Brian Jeapes	658	32.2	−9.9
Conservative	John Pioli	570	27.9	−8.8
Green	Paul Wilson	339	16.6	N/A
Labour	Karen Kennedy	222	10.9	−5.8
Labour	Russell Kennedy	199	9.7	−5.8
Turnout			32.15	−34.8
Rejected ballots		27	1.2	
Registered electors		7,011		
Liberal Democrats gain from Conservative				
Liberal Democrats gain from Conservative				
Liberal Democrats gain from Conservative				

=== St. Andrew's ===
St. Andrew's (3 seats)
Party	Candidate	Votes	%	±%
Liberal Democrats	Stephen Robinson	1,289	62.2	+30.5
Liberal Democrats	Lee Ashley	1,258	60.7	+26.3
Liberal Democrats	Ann Davidson	1,225	59.1	+33.8
Conservative	Peter Cousins	545	26.3	−15.7
Conservative	Stephen Fowell	492	23.7	−12.6
Conservative	Jake Smith	471	22.7	−10.1
Labour	Susan Myers	320	15.4	−7.7
Labour	Peter Dixon	319	15.4	−5.7
Labour	Colin Farquhar	304	14.7	−5.4
Turnout			33.29	−31.7
Rejected ballots		41	1.9	
Registered electors		6,650		
Liberal Democrats gain from Conservative				
Liberal Democrats hold				
Liberal Democrats gain from Conservative				

=== The Lawns ===
The Lawns (2 seats)
Party	Candidate	Votes	%	±%
Liberal Democrats	Natacha Dudley	969	57.5	+21.4
Liberal Democrats	Richard Lee	951	56.4	+18.3
Conservative	Christine Garrett	671	39.8	−10.7
Conservative	Julia Jeapes	639	37.9	−6.5
Labour	Ruth Sabey	140	8.3	−3.1
Turnout			42.90	−33.1
Rejected ballots		31	1.7	
Registered electors		4,176		
Liberal Democrats gain from Conservative				
Liberal Democrats gain from Conservative				

=== Trinity ===
Trinity (2 seats)
Party	Candidate	Votes	%	±%
Liberal Democrats	Martin Bracken	787	48.0	+22.9
Liberal Democrats	Julia Frascona	747	45.6	+18.1
Conservative	Graham Seeley	429	26.2	−17.0
Conservative	James Tyrrell	393	24.0	−32.9
Green	Ben Harvey	281	17.2	+5.9
Green	Peter Fowler	272	16.6	N/A
UKIP	Damien Francis	150	9.2	N/A
Labour	John Duffy	118	7.2	−12.0
Labour	Angelica Medici	99	6.0	−10.7
Turnout			36.85	−33.1
Rejected ballots		10	0.6	
Registered electors		4,641		
Liberal Democrats gain from Conservative				
Liberal Democrats gain from Conservative				

=== Waterhouse Farm ===
Waterhouse Farm (2 seats)
Party	Candidate	Votes	%	±%
Liberal Democrats	Jennie Lardge	908	65.6	+41.7
Liberal Democrats	Eleanor Sampson	852	61.5	+41.1
Conservative	Matt Flack	390	28.2	−17.1
Conservative	Chloe Ahmed	371	26.8	−12.0
Labour	Sandra Massey	248	17.9	−8.2
Turnout			32.84	−32.2
Rejected ballots		23	1.5	
Registered electors		4,647		
Liberal Democrats gain from Conservative				
Liberal Democrats gain from Conservative				

=== Writtle ===
Writtle (2 seats)
Party	Candidate	Votes	%	±%
Conservative	Tim Roper	829	68.0	+5.4
Conservative	Malcolm Watson	662	54.3	+1.5
Liberal Democrats	Birgit Baker	537	44.1	+9.4
Liberal Democrats	Paul Chaplin	410	33.6	+5.3
Turnout			32.59	−38.4
Rejected ballots		30	2.3	
Registered electors		4,063		
Conservative hold				
Conservative hold				

== Changes 2019–2023 ==
- On 20 September 2019, Liberal Democrat councillor Catherine Finnecy resigned from Marconi ward after heckling party leader Jo Swinson at the Liberal Democrat conference over the defection of Phillip Lee MP, triggering a by-election.
- In March 2020, Liberal Democrat councillor Mark Springett resigned from Moulsham Lodge ward, triggering a by-election.
- On 14 May 2021, Conservative councillor Malcolm Watson died, triggering a by-election in Writtle ward.
- In April 2022, Conservative councillor Bob Shepherd resigned from Little Baddow, Danbury and Sandon ward, triggering a by-election.
- In November 2022, veteran Conservative councillor and Mayor of Chelmsford John Galley died in Boreham and The Leighs ward; as his term was due to end in May 2023, no by-election was held.
- In February 2023, veteran Liberal Democrat councillor Tom Willis died in Goat Hall ward; as his term was due to end in May 2023, no by-election was held.

=== By-elections ===
==== Marconi ====
The by-election was triggered by the resignation of Liberal Democrat councillor Catherine Finnecy.

Marconi: 7 November 2019
Party	Candidate	Votes	%	±%
Liberal Democrats	Smita Rajesh	563	48.1	+0.6
Conservative	Ben McNally	311	26.6	−0.5
Labour	Paul Bishop	156	13.3	−12.1
Independent	Steven Chambers	72	6.1	N/A
Green	Ben Harvey	69	5.9	N/A
Majority		252	21.5	
Turnout		1,171	20.9	
Liberal Democrats hold		Swing	▲0.6	

==== Moulsham Lodge ====
The by-election was triggered by the resignation of Liberal Democrat councillor Mark Springett in March 2020.

Moulsham Lodge: 6 May 2021
Party	Candidate	Votes	%	±%
Conservative	Robert Gisby	790	43.0	+16.4
Liberal Democrats	Hazel Clark	652	35.5	−25.5
Independent	Angela Ling	183	10.0	N/A
Labour	Jake Havard	122	6.6	+2.2
Green	Ben Harvey	89	4.8	−3.2
Majority		138	7.5	
Turnout		1,836	42.26	
Conservative gain from Liberal Democrats		Swing	▲21.0	

==== Writtle ====
The by-election was triggered by the death of sitting Conservative councillor Malcolm Watson. The major issues during the campaign were the proposed 850-home Warren Farm development within Writtle parish and the City Council's proposal to charge for parking at Hylands Park.

Writtle: 1 July 2021
Party	Candidate	Votes	%	±%
Conservative	Andrew Thorpe-Apps	716	50.0	−11.2
Liberal Democrats	Lynn Foster	572	39.9	+1.1
Green	Ronnie Bartlett	78	5.4	N/A
Labour	Edward Massey	67	4.7	N/A
Majority		144	10.1	
Turnout		1,433	35.0	
Conservative hold		Swing	▼6.2	

==== Little Baddow, Danbury & Sandon ====
The by-election was triggered by the resignation of Conservative councillor Bob Shepherd.

Little Baddow, Danbury & Sandon: 5 May 2022
Party	Candidate	Votes	%	±%
Conservative	Steph Scott	1,494	69.3	
Liberal Democrats	Sue Baker	480	22.3	
Labour	Stephen Capper	183	8.5	
Majority		1,014	47.0	
Turnout		2,157	33.4	
Registered electors		6,458		
Conservative hold		Swing		
