= Marie Goldman =

British politician

Marie Goldman MP
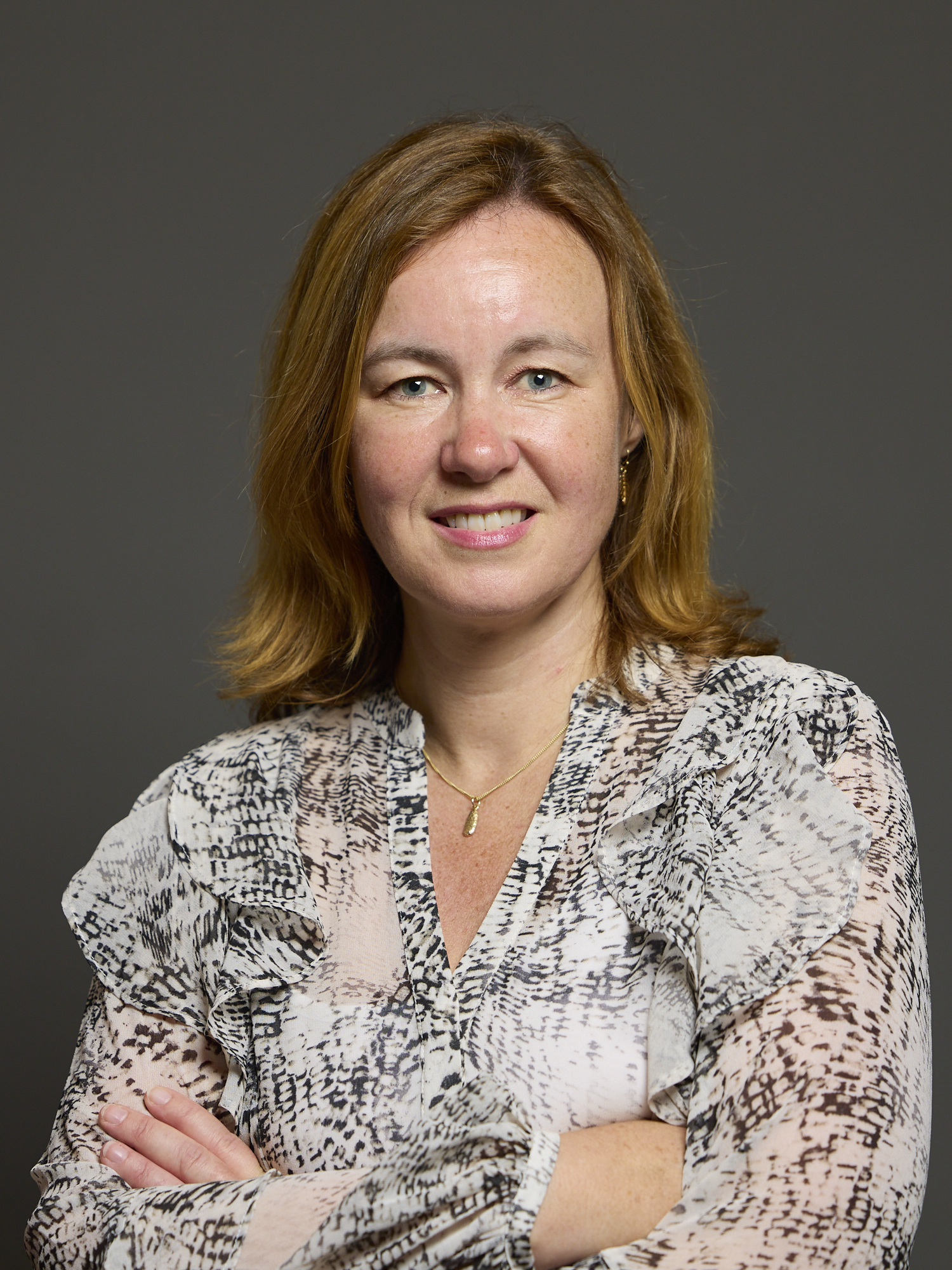
- Official portrait, 2024

Member of Parliament for Chelmsford
- Incumbent
- Assumed office 4 July 2024
- Preceded by: Vicky Ford
- Majority: 4,753 (9.4%)

Liberal Democrat portfolios
- 2024–2025: Shadow Leader of the House of Commons
- 2025–present: Women and Equalities

Member of Essex County Council for Chelmsford Central
- In office 10 May 2021 – 19 March 2025

Member of Chelmsford City Council for Moulsham and Central
- In office 6 May 2019 – 19 March 2025

Personal details
- Party: Liberal Democrats
- Spouse: Simon Goldman

Marie Clare Goldman is a British Liberal Democrat politician who has served as the Member of Parliament (MP) for Chelmsford since 2024. She is the first non-Conservative politician to represent Chelmsford in 74 years. She is the Liberal Democrat spokesperson for Women and Equalities.

== Early life and education ==
Goldman took her A-levels at Exeter College, Devon, and then gained a BA in French and management studies in 2000 at Royal Holloway, University of London.

== Political career ==
Goldman was the deputy leader of Chelmsford City Council from 2019 until August 2024, having been elected to the council at the 2019 and 2023 council elections for the ward of Moulsham and Central. She has been a member of Essex County Council for the division of Chelmsford Central since the 2021 council election.

Goldman was selected by the Liberal Democrats to run in the 2019 general election in the constituency of Chelmsford, losing to the incumbent Conservative MP, Vicky Ford.

In March 2023, Goldman was re-selected as the candidate for Chelmsford. She won in the 2024 general election, defeating Ford by a majority of 4,753 votes. Goldman is the first non-Conservative MP to serve Chelmsford since Ernest Millington, who was defeated in the 1950 general election.

On 18 September 2024, Ed Davey announced his new Frontbench Team with Goldman appointed as the Liberal Democrat Shadow Leader of the House of Commons. In September 2025 she was moved to the role of Women and Equalities Spokesperson.

== Personal life ==
Goldman runs a small construction business in Chelmsford with her husband, Simon Goldman, who also serves as a Chelmsford city councillor.

Parliament of the United Kingdom
Preceded by Vicky Ford	Member of Parliament for Chelmsford; 2024–present	Incumbent
