= Independent Network =

Organization

- Founded: 2005
- Type: Non-profit association / political party
- Purpose: Independent political candidates
- Location: London, UK
- Region served: Politics
- Website: independentnetwork.org.uk

The Independent Network (IN) is a United Kingdom-based non-profit organisation supporting independent politicians and political candidates. It is registered as a political party with the Electoral Commission in Great Britain and Northern Ireland.

IN consists of supporters and volunteers who advocate non-partisan politics. Former MPs Martin Bell and Richard Taylor have been involved. A number of supporters of IN are current independent representatives in national, regional and local governments.

IN does not impose political views on the individuals it supports. However, individuals must adhere to a code of conduct.

== Organisation ==
Marianne Overton, Jim Thornton and Karen Lucioni are the organisation's leadership, fulfilling the roles of leader, treasurer, nominations officer and campaigns officer. Similarly, these individuals are the registered officers for the political party. The organisation has been registered as a company since 2009, with Thornton and Brian Ahearne serving as directors.

== Supporters ==
IN has been supported by several notable figures in independent politics, including Martin Bell; Richard Taylor MP; Terry Waite and Esther Rantzen.

During the 2005 elections, with IN's backing, Reg Keys contested Sedgefield, the constituency of Tony Blair, following the death of his son in the Iraq War.

In January 2010, Waite sent an open letter to all independent Parliamentary candidates giving them his support and approval.

== Services ==
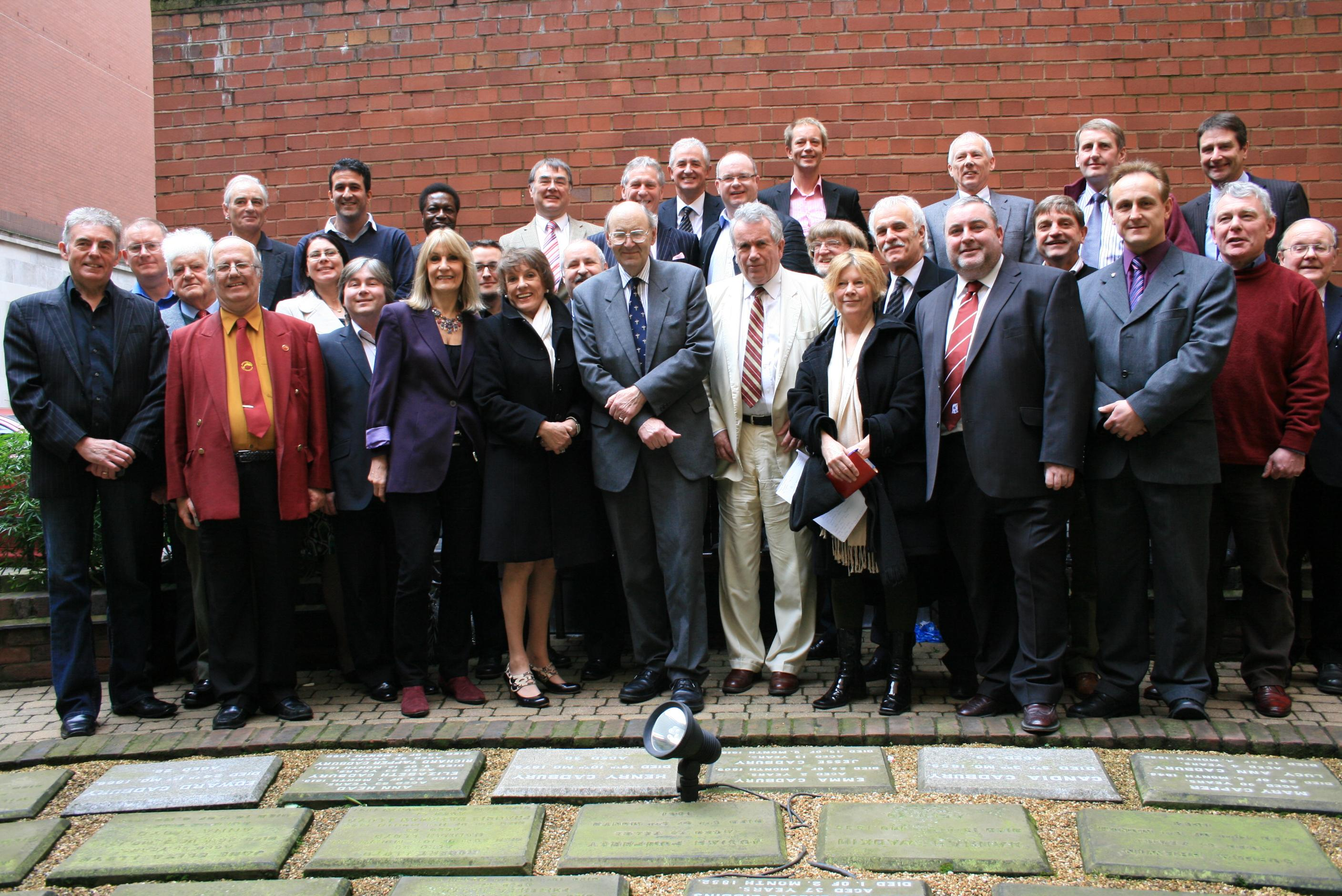
Independent PPCs at the January Workshop in Birmingham.

IN offers services and support to independent candidates. Services include:

- Administrative and legal assistance for election purposes
- A list of best practices for campaigning, fundraising, public relations, and appropriate use of the Internet.
- Public opinion and policy research.
- Organising debates and discussions.

In January 2010, IN held a workshop in the Birmingham Priory Rooms to instruct PPCs on the electoral process and regulations. Bell, Taylor, Rantzen, and Lynn Faulds Wood attended the event.

IN endorsed independent candidates in the 2010 election. Endorsed candidates could use the IN logo and branding.

=== The Candidate Academy ===
As part of its expanded support framework, the Independent Network operates the Candidate Academy, a specialized initiative designed to provide independent politicians with structured training and mentorship. The academy focuses on equipping candidates with the practical skills and legal knowledge necessary to navigate the electoral process without the institutional support of traditional political parties. By offering resources on campaign strategy and voter engagement, the academy serves as a professional hub where candidates can share best practices while maintaining their commitment to the Bell Principles. This educational infrastructure aims to ensure that independent representatives can conduct robust, ethically-grounded campaigns that are responsive to local community needs.

== Elected representatives ==
The IN holds one seat on Chelmsford Borough Council since 2023, and three on Wigan Metropolitan Borough Council since May 2026.
