= Mashbury =

Civil parish in Essex, England

Coordinates: 51.780°N 0.392°E

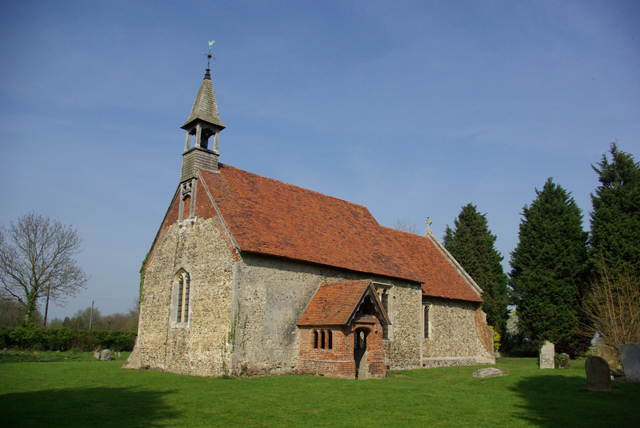
- Former Mashbury parish church

- Location within Essex
- Population: 98 (Parish, 2021)
- Civil parish: Mashbury
- District: Chelmsford
- Shire county: Essex
- Region: East
- Country: England
- Sovereign state: United Kingdom
- Post town: CHELMSFORD
- Postcode district: CM1
- Police: Essex
- Fire: Essex
- Ambulance: East of England
- UK Parliament: Chelmsford

Mashbury is a small village and civil parish in the Chelmsford district of Essex, England. It lies 5 miles (8 km) north-west of Chelmsford. At the 2021 census the parish had a population of 98.

Mashbury appears in the Domesday Book of 1086 as Masseburig in the Dunmow hundred of Essex. No church was mentioned in the Domesday Book, but it subsequently became a parish following the construction of its church in the 12th century. The dedication of the church is not known. It became redundant in the early 1980s.
