= City of Chelmsford =

City and borough in Essex, England

- City, borough and non-metropolitan district
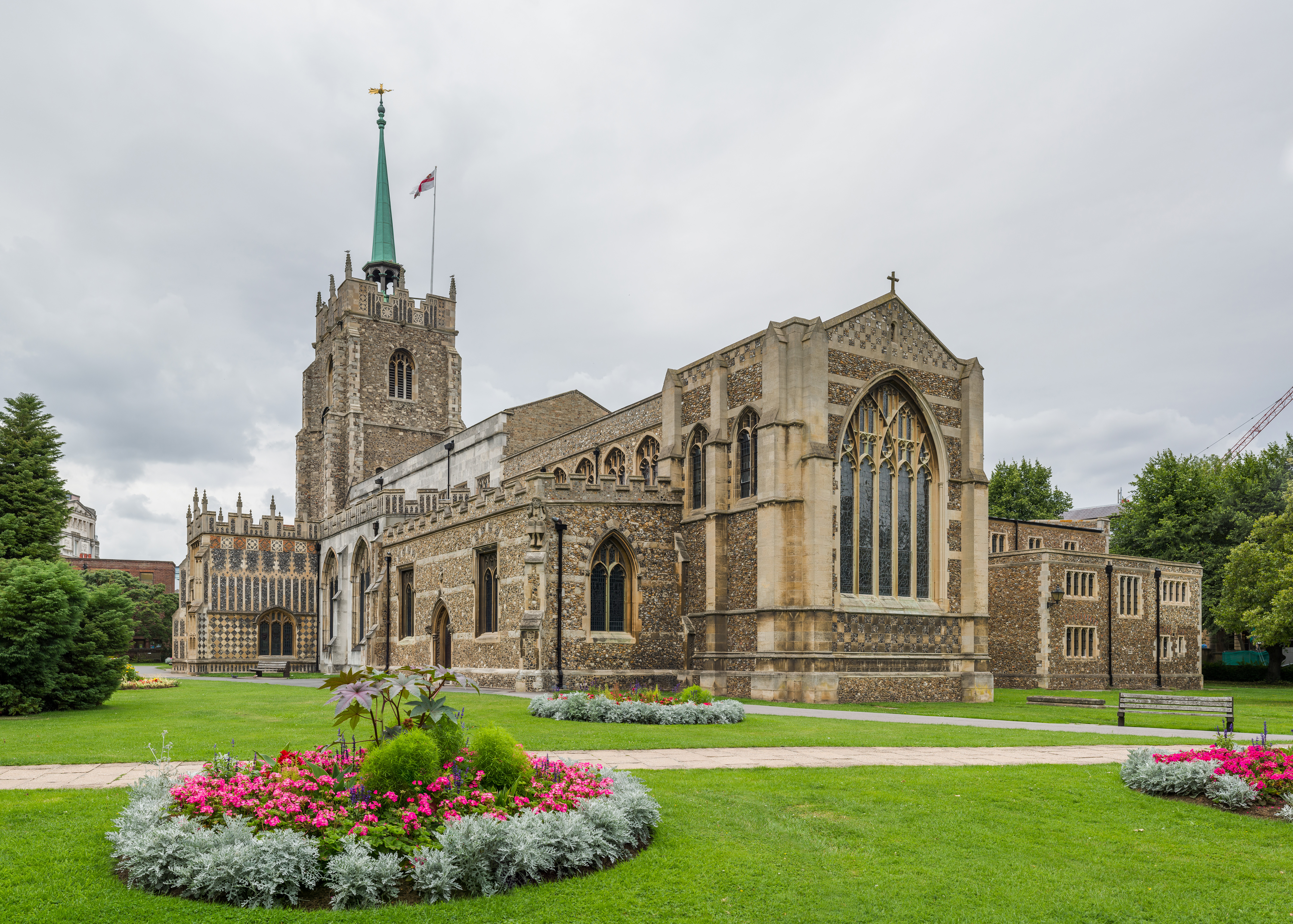
- The cathedral in Chelmsford, the administrative centre of the district

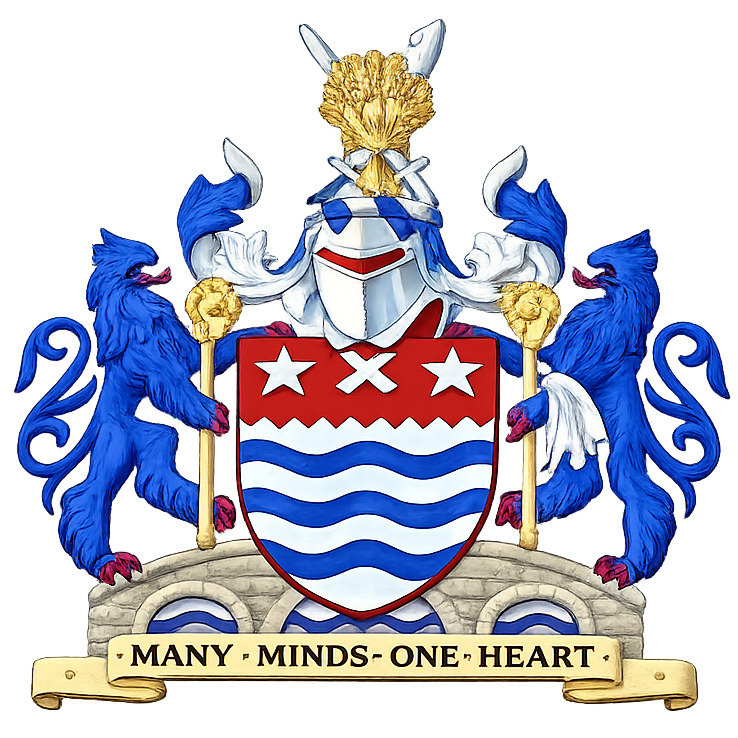
- Coat of arms
- Interactive map of City of Chelmsford
- Coordinates: 51°44′07″N 0°28′45″E
- Sovereign state: United Kingdom
- Country: England
- Region: East of England
- Non-metropolitan county: Essex
- Admin HQ: Chelmsford
- Incorporated: 1 April 1974

Government
  - Type: Non-metropolitan district council
  - Body: Chelmsford City Council
  - Leadership: Leader & Cabinet (Liberal Democrat)
  - MPs: Marie Goldman (LD), Kemi Badenoch (C), John Whittingdale (C)

Area
  - Total: 132.14 sq mi (342.24 km^{2})
  - Rank: 107th (of 296)

Population (2024)
  - Total: 188,803
  - Rank: 111th (of 296)
  - Density: 1,428.8/sq mi (551.67/km^{2})

Ethnicity (2021)
  - Ethnic groups: List: 88.5% White; 5.3% Asian; 2.6% Black; 2.6% Mixed; 0.9% other

Religion (2021)
  - Religion: List: 48% Christianity; 41.2% no religion; 8.8% other; 2% Islam
- Time zone: UTC0 (GMT)
  - Summer (DST): UTC+1 (BST)
- ONS code: 22UF (ONS); E07000070 (GSS)
- OS grid reference: TL713070
- Click the map for an interactive full screen view

The City of Chelmsford (/ˈtʃɛlmzfərd/) is a local government district with borough and city status in Essex, England. The district is named after its main settlement, Chelmsford, the county town of Essex, and also includes the surrounding rural area and the town of South Woodham Ferrers. Its neighbouring districts are Uttlesford, Braintree, Maldon, Rochford, Basildon, Brentwood and Epping Forest.

== History ==
Chelmsford's first elected council was a local board of health established in 1850. This replaced a body of improvement commissioners which had previously administered the town under the Chelmsford Improvement Act 1789 (29 Geo. 3. c. 44). (Note: An act for paving the footways of the several streets, public passages and places within the town of Chelmsford, and hamlet of Moulsham, in the parish of Chelmsford, in the county of Essex, and for cleaning, lighting, and watching the said town and hamlet, and for removing and preventing nuisances, annoyances and encroachments therein (29 Geo. 3. c. 44).)

The local board was, in turn, replaced by the Chelmsford Corporation in 1888, when the town was incorporated to become a municipal borough.

The current district was formed on 1 April 1974 under the Local Government Act 1972, covering two former districts which were abolished at the same time:

- Chelmsford Municipal Borough
- Chelmsford Rural District. (Note: Except for the two parishes of Ingatestone and Fryerning and Mountnessing that went to Brentwood.)

The new district was named after its main town. The new council was initially called Chelmsford District Council. Charter trustees were established for the area of the former municipal borough so as to allow the town to continue to have a mayor. The new district was granted borough status in 1977, changing the name of the council to Chelmsford Borough Council and allowing the chair of the council to take the title of mayor instead, with the charter trustees then being disbanded.

On 1 June 2012, the town was granted city status to mark the Diamond Jubilee of Elizabeth II and the council therefore changed its name to Chelmsford City Council.

In March 2026, the government announced that it would abolish the district in 2028 as part of local government reform across Essex. These proposals were withdrawn in September 2026.

== Governance ==
Chelmsford City Council

Type
- Type: Non-metropolitan district

Leadership
- Mayor: Lynne Foster, Liberal Democrat, since 13 May 2026
- Leader: Stephen Robinson, Liberal Democrat, since 22 May 2019
- Chief executive: Nick Eveleigh, since February 2018

Structure
- Seats: 57 councillors
- Political groups: Administration (31) Liberal Democrats (31) Other parties (26) Conservatives (19) Reform UK (2) Independent (5)

Elections
- Last election: 4 May 2023

Meeting place
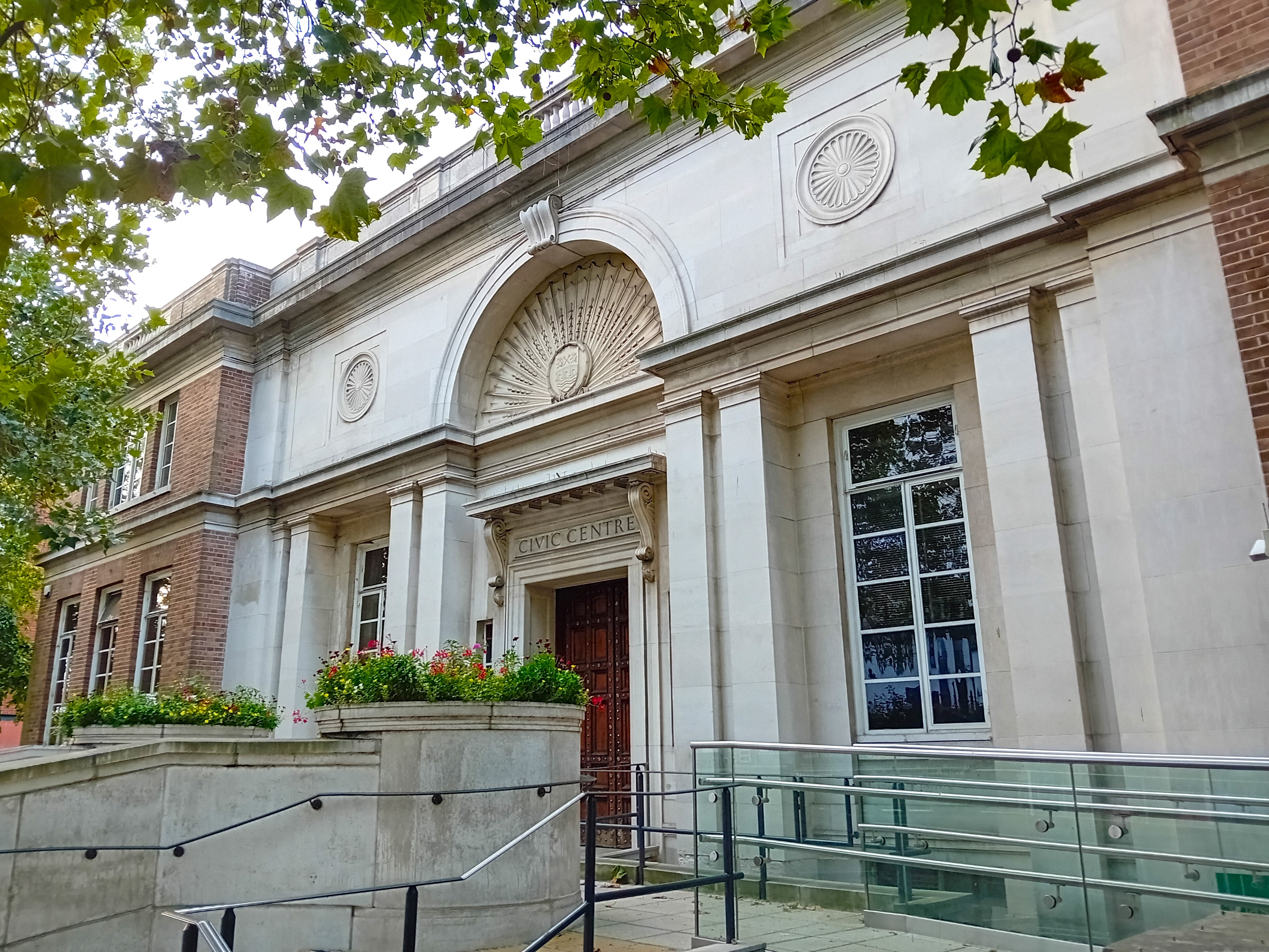
- Chelmsford Civic Centre, Duke Street, Chelmsford, CM1 1JE

Website
- www.chelmsford.gov.uk

Chelmsford City Council provides district-level services; county-level services are provided by Essex County Council. Parts of the district are also covered by civil parishes, which form a third tier of local government.

=== Political control ===
The council has been controlled by the Liberal Democrats since the 2019 election.

The first election to the council was held in 1973, initially operating as a shadow authority alongside the outgoing authorities until the new arrangements came into effect on 1 April 1974. Political control of the council since then has been as follows: (Note: Put "Chelmsford" in search box to see specific results.)

Party in control	Years
No overall control	1974–1976
Conservative	1976–1983
Alliance	1983–1988
Liberal Democrats	1988–1991
Conservative	1991–1995
Liberal Democrats	1995–1999
No overall control	1999–2003
Conservative	2003–2019
Liberal Democrats	2019–present

=== Leadership ===
The role of mayor is largely ceremonial in Chelmsford. Political leadership is instead provided by the leader of the council. The leaders since 2003 have been:

Councillor	Party	From	To
Roy Whitehead	Conservative	2003	May 2019
Stephen Robinson	Liberal Democrats	May 2019	Incumbent

=== Composition ===
Following the 2023 election, and subsequent by-elections and changes of allegiance up to May 2026, the composition of the council was:

Party	Councillors
Liberal Democrats	31
Conservative	19
Reform	2
Independent	5
Total	57

Two of the independent politicians sit together as the Chelmsford Independents Group.

=== Premises ===
The council is based at Chelmsford Civic Centre on Duke Street. The building was purpose-built for the former borough council and was opened in 1935.

=== Elections ===
Since the last full review of boundaries in 2003, the council has comprised 57 councillors elected from 24 wards, with each ward electing one, two or three councillors. Elections are held every four years.

=== Parishes ===
There are 29 civil parishes in the district. The former Chelmsford Municipal Borough is an unparished area, directly administered by Chelmsford City Council. The parish council for South Woodham Ferrers takes the style Town Council, whilst the parish of Mashbury has a parish meeting rather than a parish council due to its small population.

- Boreham
- Broomfield
- Chelmer
- Chelmsford Garden
- Chignall
- Danbury
- East Hanningfield
- Galleywood
- Good Easter
- Great Baddow
- Great and Little Leighs
- Great Waltham
- Highwood
- Little Baddow
- Little Waltham
- Margaretting
- Mashbury
- Pleshey
- Rettendon
- Roxwell
- Runwell
- Sandon
- South Hanningfield
- South Woodham Ferrers
- Springfield
- Stock
- West Hanningfield
- Woodham Ferrers and Bicknacre
- Writtle.

== Geography ==
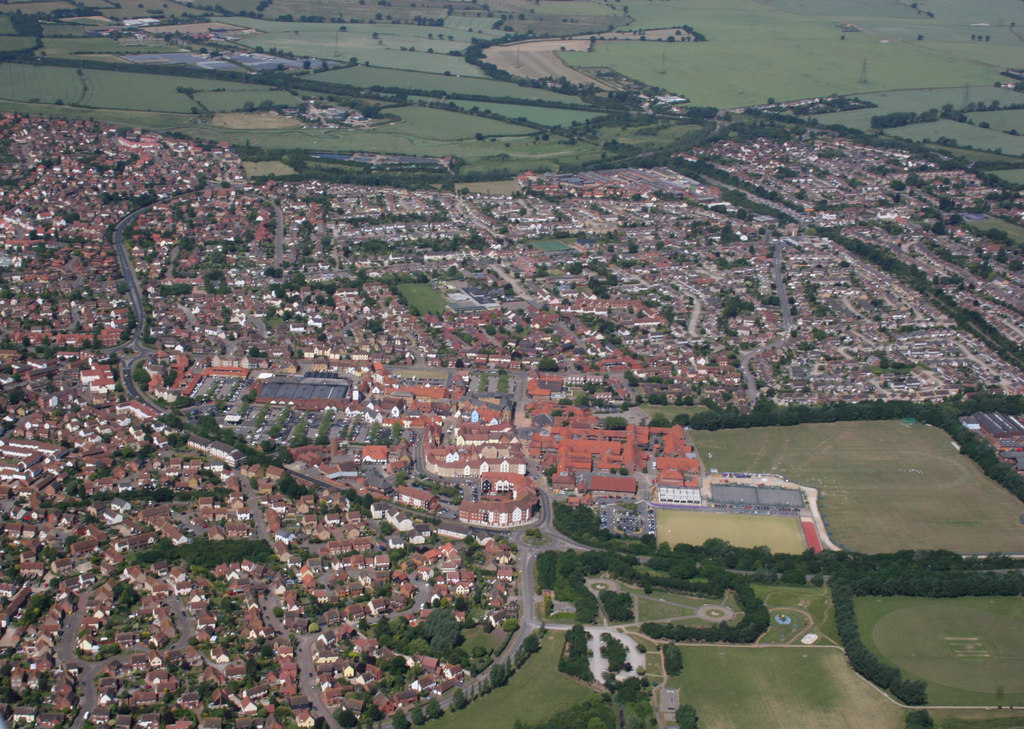
South Woodham Ferrers, the only town in the district

The district has two major centres: the principal settlement of Chelmsford in the centre and the town of South Woodham Ferrers to the south-east. The remainder of the district is predominantly rural, with many villages and hamlets.

The river Chelmer flows into the district near North End and flows to Chelmsford where the river Can converges with it at the city centre. The Chelmer then flows out of the district between Boreham and Little Baddow. The Can's source is in the north west of the district. The river Wid flows from the south of the borough through Widford towards the centre, past Writtle, to join the Can between Writtle and Chelmsford. The river Crouch flows along the part of the south-eastern border below South Woodham Ferrers. Hanningfield Reservoir, a Site of Special Scientific Interest, is located to the south of the borough.

== Transport ==
Two railway lines serve the borough, with all passenger services operated by Greater Anglia:

- The Great Eastern Main Line connects London Liverpool Street and Norwich, via Chelmsford, Colchester and Ipswich; branches off the main line lead to Clacton-on-Sea, Harwich Town and Braintree.
- The Crouch Valley Line connects Wickford and Southminster, via South Woodham Ferrers.

The Dutchflyer, a rail/sea/rail international service owned by Stena Line also stops at Chelmsford, on its route between London Liverpool Street and the Netherlands, via North Sea ferries.

There are several primary routes within the borough:

- A12 trunk road and runs from east London and the M25, centrally in a north-easterly direction through the borough, bypassing the city of Chelmsford and onwards to Lowestoft, in Suffolk
- A130, which runs north-south through Essex from Howe Green to Canvey Island, via the eastern edge of Chelmsford and the west of South Woodham Ferrers
- A414, between Maldon and Hemel Hempstead, via Chelmsford, the M11 and Harlow.

A large integrated bus network is provided primarily by First Essex, which connects the borough to towns and villages across the county. Other smaller operators include Stephensons of Essex, Konectbus and Arriva Essex.

== Education ==
The main educational establishments in the borough include:

Tertiary:

- Anglia Ruskin University
- Chelmsford College of further education
- Writtle College, an agricultural college.

Secondary:

- Chelmsford County High School for Girls
- King Edward VI Grammar School, known locally as KEGS
- Beaulieu Park School (Note: Essex's first all-through school.)
- The Boswells School
- Chelmer Valley High School
- Columbus School and College, a special education needs (SEN) school
- Great Baddow High School
- Hylands School, a specialist science and sixth form college
- Moulsham High School
- New Hall School
- St John Payne Catholic School
- The Sandon School
- Thriftwood College, a SEN sixth form
- Thriftwood School, a SEN school
- William de Ferrers School.

== Tourism ==
Henry VIII's former Palace of Beaulieu is situated in Boreham; it is now occupied by New Hall School.

The Royal Horticultural Society's Garden in Hyde Hall is located at Rettendon and there are numerous open spaces in Chelmsford, including Admiral and Central Parks.

Writtle is where Robert the Bruce is said to have married his second wife Elizabeth de Burgh in 1302; it has English Royal connections, with King John building a hunting lodge there in 1211. Much of the site now lies within the grounds of Writtle College, the internationally-famous centre for horticulture and agriculture.

A few miles away is the village of Pleshey, where the ruins of a once important castle mentioned in William Shakespeare's play Richard II lie. The entire circuit of the castle walls can still be traced in the village streets. American tourists often visit the village of Springfield, the origin of Springfield as a popular place name; it first gave its name to the city of Springfield, Massachusetts, and subsequently Springfield, Illinois (Note: The state capital of Illinois.) and Springfield, Missouri.

== Freedom of the City ==
The following people have received the Freedom of the City of Chelmsford:

=== Individuals ===
- Colonel Sir John Ruggles-Brise: 1967
- Freda Mountain: 2012
- Roy Whitehead: 2026.

== Arms ==
Coat of arms of Chelmsford City Council
Notes Granted 3 March 1975 Crest On a wreath of the colours a garb Or transfixed with a seaxe and a sword in saltire points upwards both Proper. Escutcheon Argent three bars wavy Azure on a chief indented Gules a saltire couped between two mullets Argent. Supporters Dexter a lion Azure supporting an episcopal crozier Or sinister a like lion supporting an abbatical crozier Or with veil proper upon a compartment comprising a triple arched stone bridge above water barry wavy. Motto Many Minds One Heart
