= Chelmsford City Council elections =

Local government elections in Essex, England

Chelmsford City Council in Essex, England is elected every four years. Since the last boundary changes in 2003 the council has comprised 57 councillors elected from 24 wards.

== Council elections ==
- 1973 Chelmsford District Council election
- 1976 Chelmsford District Council election (New ward boundaries)
- 1979 Chelmsford Borough Council election
- 1983 Chelmsford Borough Council election
- 1987 Chelmsford Borough Council election (New ward boundaries & borough boundary changes also took place)
- 1991 Chelmsford Borough Council election
- 1995 Chelmsford Borough Council election
- 1999 Chelmsford Borough Council election
- 2003 Chelmsford Borough Council election (New ward boundaries increased the number of seats by 1)
- 2007 Chelmsford Borough Council election
- 2011 Chelmsford Borough Council election
- 2015 Chelmsford City Council election
- 2019 Chelmsford City Council election
- 2023 Chelmsford City Council election

== Election results ==
Year	Conservative	Labour	Liberal Democrats (Note: Includes totals for the predecessors of the Liberal Democrats, the Liberal Party and SDP (both of which participated in the Alliance).)	Independents & Others	Council control after election
Local government reorganisation; council established (60 seats)
1973	30	16	8	6	No overall control
New ward boundaries
1976	46	3	9	2	Conservative
1979	36	3	19	2	Conservative
1983	26	0	31	3	Alliance
New ward boundaries; seats decreased from 60 to 56
1987	24	0	29	3	Alliance
1991	29	2	21	4	Conservative
1995	13	7	32	4	Liberal Democrats
1999	21	5	28	2	No overall control
New ward boundaries; seats increased from 56 to 57
2003	35	2	20	0	Conservative
2007	33	0	24	0	Conservative
2011	40	1	15	1	Conservative
2015	52	0	5	0	Conservative
2019	21	0	31	2	Liberal Democrats
2023	21	0	33	3	Liberal Democrats

== Results maps ==
1976 results map

1979 results map

1983 results map

1987 results map

1991 results map

1995 results map

1999 results map

2003 results map

2007 results map

2011 results map

2015 results map

2019 results map

2023 results map

== By-election results ==
A by-election occurs when seats become vacant between council elections. Below is a summary of by-elections from 1983 onwards. Full by-election results are listed under the last regular election preceding the by-election and can be found by clicking on the ward name.

=== 1983-1994 ===
Ward	Date	Incumbent party	Winning party
Moulsham Lodge	10 November 1983	Alliance	Alliance
Waterhouse Farm	21 June 1984	Alliance	Alliance
Boreham & Springfield	7 February 1985	Alliance	Alliance
St Andrew's	11 July 1985	Conservative	Labour
Boreham & Springfield	5 December 1985	Alliance	Alliance
Baddow Road	20 March 1986	Conservative	Alliance
Rettendon & Runwell	4 May 1989	Conservative	Conservative
South Woodham - Elmwood & Woodville	22 February 1990	Liberal Democrats	Liberal Democrats
Writtle	8 December 1994	Conservative	Liberal Democrats

=== 1995-2006 ===
Ward	Date	Incumbent party	Winning party
Old Moulsham	16 September 1999	Liberal Democrats	Conservative
Boreham	6 July 2000	Independent	Conservative
Woodham Ferrers & Bicknacre	2 May 2002	Conservative	Conservative
Little Baddow, Danbury & Sandon	11 November 2004	Conservative	Conservative
Trinity	5 May 2005	Liberal Democrats	Liberal Democrats
South Woodham - Elmwood & Woodville	5 May 2005	Conservative	Conservative
The Lawns	15 September 2005	Liberal Democrats	Liberal Democrats
Bicknacre & East & West Hanningfield	23 February 2006	Conservative	Conservative

=== 2007-2018 ===
Ward	Date	Incumbent party	Winning party
Broomfield & The Walthams	11 September 2007	Conservative	Liberal Democrats
Moulsham & Central	14 December 2007	Conservative	Liberal Democrats
Patching Hall	28 June 2012	Liberal Democrats	Liberal Democrats
Broomfield & The Walthams	19 February 2013	Independent	Liberal Democrats
South Woodham - Elmwood & Woodville	5 December 2013	Conservative	SWFCTA
Bicknacre & East & West Hanningfield	9 October 2014	Conservative	Conservative
Moulsham & Central	4 May 2017	Conservative	Conservative

=== 2019-present ===
Ward	Date	Incumbent party	Winning party
Marconi	7 November 2019	Liberal Democrats	Liberal Democrats
Moulsham Lodge	6 May 2021	Liberal Democrats	Conservative
Writtle	1 July 2021	Conservative	Conservative
Little Baddow, Danbury & Sandon	5 May 2022	Conservative	Conservative
Moulsham & Central	1 May 2025	Liberal Democrats	Liberal Democrats
Moulsham & Central	1 May 2025	Liberal Democrats	Liberal Democrats
Broomfield and The Walthams	7 May 2026	Liberal Democrats	Conservative
