= 1995 Chelmsford Borough Council election =

1995 UK local government election

← 1991	4 May 1995	1999 →

All 56 seats to Chelmsford Borough Council 29 seats needed for a majority

	First party	Second party
Party	Liberal Democrats	Conservative
Seats won	32	13
Seat change	▲11	▼15
Popular vote	43,751	30,441
Percentage	40.9%	28.5%
Swing	▲3.3%	▼14.0%
	Third party	Fourth party
Party	Labour	Independent
Seats won	7	4
Seat change	▲5	▼1
Popular vote	28,470	3,774
Percentage	26.6%	3.5%
Swing	▲11.7%	▼0.4%
- Winner of each seat at the 1995 Chelmsford Borough Council election.
Council control before election
No overall control
Council control after election
Liberal Democrats

The 1995 Chelmsford Borough Council election took place on 4 May 1995 to elect members of Chelmsford Borough Council in England. This was on the same day as other local elections.

== Summary ==
=== Election result ===
1995 Chelmsford Borough Council election
Party	Candidates	Seats	Gains	Losses	Net gain/loss	Seats %	Votes %	Votes	+/−
Liberal Democrats	53	32	16	5	▲11	57.1	40.9	43,751	+3.3
Conservative	53	13	2	17	▼15	23.2	28.5	30,441	–14.0
Labour	56	7	5	0	▲5	12.5	26.6	28,470	+11.7
Independent	7	4	1	2	▼1	7.1	3.5	3,774	–0.4
Green	4	0	0	0	Steady	0.0	0.5	515	+0.3

== Ward results ==
=== All Saints ===
All Saints
Party	Candidate	Votes	%	±%
Labour	W. Horslen	1,014	62.9	+18.7
Labour	A. Longden	958	59.4	+18.0
Liberal Democrats	L. Foster	311	19.3	−10.6
Liberal Democrats	I. Gale	286	17.7	−12.2
Conservative	C. Hodges	234	14.5	−6.3
Conservative	C. Lee	225	14.0	−7.1
Turnout		1,612	40.1	−6.4
Labour hold				
Labour hold				

=== Baddow Road & Great Baddow Village ===
Baddow Road & Great Baddow Village
Party	Candidate	Votes	%	±%
Liberal Democrats	C. Davies	1,430	54.6	+3.6
Liberal Democrats	C. Rackham	1,305	49.8	+3.5
Liberal Democrats	T. Miller	1,270	48.5	−3.8
Conservative	J. Chandler	614	23.4	−12.3
Conservative	M. Knowles	587	22.4	−12.4
Labour	L. Hobbs	567	21.6	+11.4
Conservative	P. Start	551	21.0	−13.4
Labour	O. Ephraim	544	20.8	+10.1
Labour	D. Shinn	527	20.1	+9.9
Turnout		2,621	43.6	−9.5
Liberal Democrats hold				
Liberal Democrats hold				
Liberal Democrats hold				

=== Boreham ===
Boreham
Party	Candidate	Votes	%	±%
Liberal Democrats	M. Dilloway	687	65.6	+6.1
Labour	F. Lucking	178	17.0	+9.6
Conservative	P. Thorne	157	15.0	−9.8
Green	E. Burgess	26	2.5	−5.8
Majority		509	48.6	+13.9
Turnout		1,048	40.7	−10.1
Liberal Democrats hold		Swing	▼1.8	

=== Broomfield Pleshey & Great Waltham ===
Broomfield Pleshey & Great Waltham
Party	Candidate	Votes	%	±%
Independent	D. Ashford	1,049	51.6	+7.4
Liberal Democrats	G. Pooley	710	35.0	+11.6
Conservative	C. Cole	620	30.5	−6.9
Labour	H. Chad	486	23.9	+8.8
Labour	R. Quinton	420	20.7	+10.4
Green	A. Thomson	160	7.9	N/A
Turnout		2,031	39.1	−9.3
Independent hold				
Liberal Democrats gain from Conservative				

=== Cathedral ===
Cathedral
Party	Candidate	Votes	%	±%
Liberal Democrats	M. Bracken	973	47.6	+7.7
Liberal Democrats	B. Gammie	965	47.3	+7.8
Conservative	J. Candler	637	31.2	−11.1
Conservative	J. Melville	600	29.4	−10.6
Labour	S. Horslen	402	19.7	+6.0
Labour	R. Kennedy	396	19.4	+6.1
Turnout		2,042	47.4	−2.0
Liberal Democrats gain from Conservative				
Liberal Democrats gain from Conservative				

=== Chignall Good Easter, Highwoodmashbury & Roxwell ===
Chignall Good Easter, Highwoodmashbury & Roxwell
Party	Candidate	Votes	%	±%
Liberal Democrats	P. Evans	476	50.9	+14.7
Conservative	B. Cooper	295	31.5	−13.4
Labour	M. Bloomer	165	17.6	−1.4
Majority		181	19.3	—
Turnout		936	48.4	−12.4
Liberal Democrats gain from Conservative		Swing	▲14.1	

=== East & West Hanningfield ===
East & West Hanningfield
Party	Candidate	Votes	%	±%
Independent	A. Dixon	528	70.0	+18.8
Labour	J. Spurgeon	226	30.0	+14.5
Majority		302	40.0	+22.0
Turnout		754	42.8	−12.1
Independent hold		Swing	▲2.2	

=== Galleywood ===
Galleywood
Party	Candidate	Votes	%	±%
Conservative	J. Potter	672	35.4	−10.7
Conservative	R. Thorne	665	35.1	−10.7
Labour	M. Briault	628	33.1	+14.1
Labour	A. Final	595	31.4	+15.5
Liberal Democrats	J. Clarke	568	30.0	−3.1
Liberal Democrats	J. Hutchon	426	22.5	N/A
Turnout		1,896	41.2	−1.3
Conservative hold				
Conservative hold				

=== Goat Hall ===
Goat Hall
Party	Candidate	Votes	%	±%
Liberal Democrats	G. Allen	1,205	65.7	+21.9
Liberal Democrats	F. Mountain	1,042	56.8	+10.6
Conservative	V. Makin	409	22.3	−21.0
Conservative	D. Lee	401	21.9	−20.5
Labour	J. Bliss	313	17.1	+9.0
Labour	S. O'Brien	265	14.4	+5.3
Turnout		1,835	41.1	−11.8
Liberal Democrats hold				
Liberal Democrats hold				

=== Great & Little Leighs & Little Waltham ===
Great & Little Leighs & Little Waltham
Party	Candidate	Votes	%	±%
Conservative	A. Willsher	551	55.7	−12.9
Labour	J. Burrow	269	27.2	+14.7
Liberal Democrats	M. Noble	169	17.1	−1.8
Majority		282	28.5	−21.2
Turnout		989	43.3	−6.5
Conservative hold		Swing	▼13.8	

=== Little Baddow Danbury & Sandon ===
Little Baddow Danbury & Sandon
Party	Candidate	Votes	%	±%
Conservative	C. Kingsley	1,240	43.7	−10.0
Conservative	M. Hurrell	1,218	42.9	−11.2
Conservative	M. Holoway	1,183	41.7	N/A
Independent	J. Bacon	862	30.4	−12.2
Liberal Democrats	M. Staines	790	27.8	+5.5
Liberal Democrats	L. O'Brien	780	27.5	+6.5
Liberal Democrats	D. Whiteing	754	26.6	+5.0
Labour	W. Jardine	310	10.9	+5.6
Labour	L. Cawston	300	10.6	+5.0
Labour	D. Newton	243	8.6	+4.0
Green	C. Budgey	241	8.5	N/A
Turnout		2,839	44.3	−7.3
Conservative hold				
Conservative hold				
Conservative gain from Independent				

=== Margaretting & Stock ===
Margaretting & Stock
Party	Candidate	Votes	%	±%
Conservative	I. Clenaghan	655	59.1	−13.0
Liberal Democrats	J. Braithwaite	271	24.4	+10.3
Labour	R. Jones	183	16.5	+2.7
Majority		384	34.7	−23.3
Turnout		1,109	46.6	−3.2
Conservative hold		Swing	▼11.7	

=== Moulsham Lodge ===
Moulsham Lodge
Party	Candidate	Votes	%	±%
Liberal Democrats	D. Jones	1,128	62.5	+13.0
Liberal Democrats	C. Stephenson	1,085	60.1	+2.7
Labour	D. Hopgood	384	21.3	+7.6
Labour	Y. Cleary	375	20.8	+9.5
Conservative	D. Cruickshank	331	18.3	−9.8
Conservative	S. Cruickshank	314	17.4	−9.6
Turnout		1,806	44.6	−5.2
Liberal Democrats hold				
Liberal Democrats hold				

=== Old Moulsham ===
Old Moulsham
Party	Candidate	Votes	%	±%
Liberal Democrats	W. Hale	980	39.0	+4.1
Liberal Democrats	K. Francis	960	38.2	+2.5
Liberal Democrats	V. Sadowsky	959	38.1	+5.7
Conservative	C. Cave	740	29.4	−19.0
Conservative	Y. Miller	688	27.3	−16.2
Labour	R. Cawston	679	27.0	+11.9
Labour	A. Scammell	651	25.9	+12.2
Conservative	D. Stevenson	634	25.2	−15.5
Labour	M. Pearson	608	24.2	+9.4
Independent	S. Stratton	170	6.8	N/A
Turnout		2,516	44.5	−5.5
Liberal Democrats gain from Conservative				
Liberal Democrats gain from Conservative				
Liberal Democrats gain from Conservative				

=== Patching Hall ===
Patching Hall
Party	Candidate	Votes	%	±%
Liberal Democrats	R. Monk	1,188	48.8	+7.0
Liberal Democrats	C. Barrett	1,165	47.8	+4.7
Liberal Democrats	A. Johnston	1,148	47.1	+7.5
Labour	R. Essery	595	24.4	+10.7
Conservative	A. Lewis	583	23.9	−15.0
Conservative	D. Kimberlin	570	23.4	−14.1
Labour	D. Howell	568	23.3	+11.2
Conservative	C. Wickers	528	21.7	−15.5
Labour	P. Bennett	519	21.3	+9.5
Turnout		2,435	42.6	−8.8
Liberal Democrats hold				
Liberal Democrats hold				
Liberal Democrats hold				

=== Rettendon & Runwell ===
Rettendon & Runwell
Party	Candidate	Votes	%	±%
Conservative	E. Mickelborough	588	40.8	N/A
Independent	E. Roberts	526	36.5	N/A
Labour	R. Patterson	420	29.1	N/A
Labour	T. Mahon	414	28.7	N/A
Liberal Democrats	N. Sutcliffe	294	20.4	N/A
Turnout		1,441	36.0	N/A
Conservative hold				
Independent hold				

=== Rothmans ===
Rothmans
Party	Candidate	Votes	%	±%
Liberal Democrats	M. Hutchon	816	47.4	+0.2
Liberal Democrats	F. Page	810	47.0	±0.0
Labour	B. Rudkin	481	27.9	+14.7
Labour	A. Wilson	471	27.3	+14.4
Conservative	E. Alliston	392	22.8	−14.3
Conservative	I. Day	340	19.7	−17.0
Turnout		1,723	39.6	−4.1
Liberal Democrats hold				
Liberal Democrats hold				

=== South Hanningfield ===
South Hanningfield
Party	Candidate	Votes	%	±%
Conservative	J. Norton	429	59.7	N/A
Labour	M. Viney	195	27.2	N/A
Liberal Democrats	V. Davies	94	13.1	N/A
Majority		234	32.5	N/A
Turnout		718	39.8	N/A
Conservative gain from Independent		Swing		

=== South Woodham - Chetwood & Collingwood ===
South Woodham - Chetwood & Collingwood
Party	Candidate	Votes	%	±%
Conservative	J. Allen	839	51.7	−13.1
Conservative	M. Moulds	721	44.4	−18.2
Conservative	C. Stephenson	717	44.2	−19.1
Labour	R. Davis	453	27.9	N/A
Liberal Democrats	S. King	447	27.5	−0.5
Liberal Democrats	P. Broad	432	26.6	−0.9
Labour	M. Hoy	409	25.2	N/A
Labour	I. Potter	400	24.6	N/A
Liberal Democrats	D. Sykes	391	24.1	−1.4
Turnout		1,623	28.1	−13.2
Conservative hold				
Conservative hold				
Conservative hold				

=== South Woodham - Elmwood & Woodville ===
South Woodham - Elmwood & Woodville
Party	Candidate	Votes	%	±%
Independent	P. Martin	639	34.7	+2.7
Liberal Democrats	I. Roberts	626	34.0	+5.8
Liberal Democrats	J. Goldfinch	599	32.6	+4.9
Liberal Democrats	J. Deakin	569	30.9	+10.0
Conservative	L. Denston	528	28.7	−19.2
Labour	J. Barnett	492	26.7	+14.7
Conservative	J. Theobold	478	26.0	−16.4
Conservative	B. Pead	430	23.4	−19.0
Labour	A. Hilton	382	20.8	+9.4
Labour	W. Shaw	361	19.6	+8.9
Turnout		1,840	29.8	−9.7
Independent gain from Conservative				
Liberal Democrats gain from Conservative				
Liberal Democrats gain from Conservative				

=== Springfield North ===
Springfield North
Party	Candidate	Votes	%	±%
Liberal Democrats	W. Lane	1,295	60.1	+19.0
Liberal Democrats	S. Linger	1,201	55.7	+13.1
Liberal Democrats	M. Mackroy	1,174	54.5	+17.4
Conservative	D. Hepworth	716	33.2	−9.7
Conservative	S. Poyser	649	30.1	−10.8
Conservative	A. Tween	649	30.1	−10.6
Labour	M. Horslen	560	26.0	+13.6
Labour	S. Haigh	559	25.9	+13.0
Labour	L. Pearson	524	24.3	+13.5
Independent	R. Parker	74	3.4	N/A
Turnout		2,156	32.4	−13.1
Liberal Democrats gain from Conservative				
Liberal Democrats hold				
Liberal Democrats hold				

=== Springfield South ===
Springfield South
Party	Candidate	Votes	%	±%
Liberal Democrats	R. Webb	820	44.9	+9.3
Liberal Democrats	R. Webb	819	44.9	+7.9
Liberal Democrats	A. Lee	798	43.7	N/A
Conservative	D. Lumley	555	30.4	−22.8
Conservative	F. Vella	508	27.8	−19.4
Conservative	M. Hurley	495	27.1	−19.1
Labour	M. Dyer	375	20.5	+10.4
Labour	C. Dyer	354	19.4	+7.2
Labour	S. Emmerson	333	18.2	+8.9
Green	L. Burnett	88	4.8	N/A
Turnout		1,826	34.5	−7.0
Liberal Democrats gain from Conservative				
Liberal Democrats gain from Conservative				
Liberal Democrats gain from Conservative				

=== St. Andrews ===
St. Andrews
Party	Candidate	Votes	%	±%
Labour	R. Chad	1,501	42.0	+12.4
Labour	E. Baldwin	1,393	39.0	+11.3
Labour	J. Devane	1,301	36.4	+9.8
Liberal Democrats	C. Young	1,196	33.4	−8.9
Liberal Democrats	K. Hay	1,146	32.0	−8.3
Liberal Democrats	D. Edgson-Smith	1,130	31.6	−8.5
Conservative	K. Carr	662	18.5	−7.1
Conservative	K. Pauley	639	17.9	−7.1
Conservative	R. Paddon	619	17.3	−6.9
Turnout		3,576	53.3	±0.0
Labour gain from Liberal Democrats				
Labour gain from Liberal Democrats				
Labour gain from Liberal Democrats				

=== The Lawns ===
The Lawns
Party	Candidate	Votes	%	±%
Liberal Democrats	P. Harvey	1,398	54.8	+7.7
Liberal Democrats	A. Hall	1,255	49.2	+6.1
Conservative	R. Alcock	882	34.6	−11.1
Conservative	A. Glunn	781	30.6	−10.4
Labour	J. McLean	328	12.9	+5.2
Labour	D. Selby	289	11.3	+3.7
Turnout		2,551	53.4	−5.1
Liberal Democrats hold				
Liberal Democrats gain from Conservative				

=== Waterhouse Farm ===
Waterhouse Farm
Party	Candidate	Votes	%	±%
Labour	N. Spurgeon	912	39.4	+12.2
Labour	J. McGreevy	900	38.9	+12.9
Liberal Democrats	J. Hunnable	895	38.7	−1.8
Liberal Democrats	J. Thackray	887	38.3	−1.8
Conservative	A. Blevins	390	16.9	−10.9
Conservative	M. Fuller	386	16.7	−10.5
Turnout		2,314	50.1	−0.1
Labour gain from Liberal Democrats				
Labour gain from Liberal Democrats				

=== Woodham Ferrers & Bicknacre ===
Woodham Ferrers & Bicknacre
Party	Candidate	Votes	%	±%
Conservative	R. Grimwood	411	45.9	−19.3
Liberal Democrats	R. Phillips	311	34.7	−0.1
Labour	G. Shearwood	174	19.4	N/A
Majority		100	11.2	−19.2
Turnout		894	37.2	−5.1
Conservative hold		Swing	▼9.6	

=== Writtle ===
Writtle
Party	Candidate	Votes	%	±%
Liberal Democrats	M. Sinclair	738	35.4	+14.8
Liberal Democrats	T. Willis	673	32.3	+16.2
Labour	B. Grainger	661	31.7	+12.5
Labour	P. Blackwood	655	31.5	+12.7
Conservative	A. Sach	604	29.0	−23.1
Conservative	P. Hutchinson	560	26.9	−23.9
Turnout		2,082	46.9	−1.9
Liberal Democrats gain from Conservative				
Liberal Democrats gain from Conservative				
