= 2015 Chelmsford City Council election =

2015 UK local government election

- 7 May 2015

All 57 seats to Chelmsford City Council 29 seats needed for a majority
	First party	Second party
Party	Conservative	Liberal Democrats
Last election	40	15
Seats before	40	15
Seats won	52	5
Seat change	▲12	▼10
Popular vote	91,268	35,507
Percentage	51.9%	20.4%
Swing	▲1.6%	▼4.7%

The 2015 Chelmsford City Council election took place on 7 May 2015 to elect members of Chelmsford City Council in England. This was on the same day as other local elections.

== Results summary ==
2015 Chelmsford City Council election
Party	Seats	Gains	Losses	Net gain/loss	Seats %	Votes %	Votes	+/−
Conservative	52	12	0	▲12	91.2	51.9	97,458	±0.0
Liberal Democrats	5	0	10	▼10	8.8	20.4	38,278	-5.3
Labour	0	0	1	▼1	0.0	12.4	23,266	-4.4
UKIP	0	0	0	Steady	0.0	9.1	17,126	+8.6
SWFCTA	0	0	0	Steady	0.0	2.9	5,469	-0.5
Green	0	0	0	Steady	0.0	2.8	5,185	+2.0
Independent	0	0	1	▼1	0.0	0.4	695	-0.5
Liberal	0	0	0	Steady	0.0	0.1	150	N/A

== Ward results ==
=== Bicknacre and East and West Hanningfield ===
Bicknacre and East and West Hanningfield
Party	Candidate	Votes	%	±%
Conservative	Matt Flack	1,896	73.7	
Conservative	Richard Poulter	1,884	73.3	
Labour	Anthony Lees	359	14.0	
Labour	Joyce Lees	309	12.0	
Green	Jasmine Lawrence	278	10.8	
Liberal Democrats	David Frost	234	9.1	
Liberal Democrats	Ian Mascot	181	7.0	
Turnout			72.0	
Conservative hold				
Conservative hold				

=== Boreham and The Leighs ===
Boreham and The Leighs
Party	Candidate	Votes	%	±%
Conservative	John Galley	2,343	92.4	
Conservative	Philip Wilson	1,402	55.3	
Labour	Jason Buckley	489	19.3	
Liberal Democrats	Martin Bracken	436	17.2	
Liberal Democrats	Michael Giles	404	15.9	
Turnout			69.0	
Conservative hold				
Conservative hold				

=== Broomfield and The Walthams ===
Broomfield and The Walthams
Party	Candidate	Votes	%	±%
Conservative	Sandra Pontin	2,095	51.5	
Conservative	Barry Knight	1,994	49.0	
Conservative	James Raven	1,886	46.4	
UKIP	Charles Cole	964	23.7	
UKIP	Peter Carter	868	21.3	
UKIP	Andrew Ives	863	21.2	
Labour	Sandra Sterne	668	16.4	
Labour	Aidan Jones	595	14.6	
Liberal Democrats	Jenifer Goldfinch	511	12.6	
Liberal Democrats	Mike Farn	466	11.5	
Liberal Democrats	Jan Farn	448	11.0	
Green	Reza Hossain	434	10.7	
Green	John Howard	410	10.1	
Turnout			71.0	
Conservative hold				
Conservative hold				
Conservative gain from Independent				

=== Chelmer Village and Beaulieu Park ===
Chelmer Village and Beaulieu Park
Party	Candidate	Votes	%	±%
Conservative	Ron Alcock	3,134	67.1	
Conservative	Neil Gulliver	2,906	62.3	
Conservative	Duncan Lumley	2,606	55.8	
UKIP	Nigel Carter	929	19.9	
Labour	Daniel Ebdon	790	16.9	
Liberal Democrats	Martin Ashby	773	16.6	
Labour	Nastassia Player	731	15.7	
Labour	Paul Walentowicz	626	13.4	
Liberal Democrats	Mary Bastick	579	12.4	
Green	Thomas Fleetham	472	10.1	
Liberal Democrats	Richard Pennicard	459	9.8	
Turnout			69.0	
Conservative hold				
Conservative hold				
Conservative hold				

=== Chelmsford Rural West ===
Chelmsford Rural West
Party	Candidate	Votes	%	±%
Conservative	Nicolette Chambers	1,294	78.1	−0.5
Liberal Democrats	Paul Chaplin	188	11.3	−0.5
Labour	Prudence Jones	175	10.6	+1.0
Majority		1,106	66.8	
Turnout			76.0	
Conservative hold		Swing		

=== Galleywood ===
Galleywood
Party	Candidate	Votes	%	±%
Conservative	Janette Potter	1,757	70.6	
Conservative	David Stevenson	1,159	46.6	
UKIP	Simon Norburn	614	24.7	
Labour	Richard Hyland	599	24.1	
Liberal Democrats	Andy Cook	454	18.2	
Liberal Democrats	Chris Shaw	394	15.8	
Turnout			71.0	
Conservative hold				
Conservative hold				

=== Goat Hall ===
Goat Hall
Party	Candidate	Votes	%	±%
Conservative	Anthony McQuiggan	1,261	44.7	
Liberal Democrats	Freda Mountain	1,084	38.4	
Liberal Democrats	Linda Mascot	1,046	37.0	
Conservative	Piers Riley	967	34.2	
UKIP	Eric Johnston	613	21.7	
Labour	John Leslie	345	12.2	
Labour	Susan Leslie	331	11.7	
Turnout			73.0	
Conservative gain from Liberal Democrats				
Liberal Democrats hold				

=== Great Baddow East ===
Great Baddow East
Party	Candidate	Votes	%	±%
Conservative	Gillian Smith	1,740	45.3	
Conservative	Liz Ahmed	1,698	44.2	
Conservative	Stephanie Scott	1,596	41.5	
Liberal Democrats	Chris Rycroft	1,385	36.0	
Liberal Democrats	Andrew Sosin	1,259	32.7	
Liberal Democrats	Veronica Sadowsky	1,243	32.3	
UKIP	Ray Hodgkinson	793	20.6	
UKIP	Jesse Pryke	754	19.6	
Labour	Jack Swan	548	14.3	
Labour	Tony Taylor	518	13.5	
Turnout			71.0	
Conservative gain from Liberal Democrats				
Conservative gain from Liberal Democrats				
Conservative gain from Liberal Democrats				

=== Great Baddow West ===
Great Baddow West
Party	Candidate	Votes	%	±%
Conservative	Jenny Chandler	1,453	54.4	
Conservative	Bob Villa	997	37.3	
UKIP	Jeanette Howes	565	21.1	
UKIP	Steve Bater	544	20.4	
Liberal Democrats	Jannetta Sosin	537	20.1	
Liberal Democrats	Andrew Robson	524	19.6	
Labour	Ann Monk	482	18.0	
Green	Kathleen Stein	242	9.1	
Turnout			65.0	
Conservative hold				
Conservative hold				

=== Little Baddow, Danbury and Sandon ===
Little Baddow, Danbury and Sandon
Party	Candidate	Votes	%	±%
Conservative	Richard Ambor	2,967	72.3	
Conservative	Ian Wright	2,956	72.1	
Conservative	Bob Shepherd	2,922	71.2	
UKIP	Tim Clayton	977	23.8	
Liberal Democrats	David Whiteing	551	13.4	
Green	Rory Carlton	529	12.9	
Labour	John Devane	497	12.1	
Liberal Democrats	Lawrence O'Brien	455	11.1	
Liberal Democrats	Nicola Nunn	453	11.0	
Turnout			74.0	
Conservative hold				
Conservative hold				
Conservative hold				

=== Marconi ===
Marconi
Party	Candidate	Votes	%	±%
Conservative	Yvonne Spence	883	31.6	
Liberal Democrats	Judith Deakin	725	31.6	
Conservative	Timothy Worrall	713	31.1	
Labour	William Horslen	703	30.6	
Labour	Sandra Massey	673	29.3	
Liberal Democrats	Graham John	586	25.5	
UKIP	Helen Camblin-Smith	418	18.2	
Green	Timothy Leeson	295	12.8	
Independent	Anthony O'Donnell	149	6.5	
Liberal	Henry Boyle	110	4.8	
Liberal	Kyle Townsend	40	1.7	
Turnout			57.0	
Conservative gain from Labour				
Liberal Democrats hold				

=== Moulsham and Central ===
Moulsham and Central
Party	Candidate	Votes	%	±%
Conservative	Richard Madden	2,335	54.0	
Conservative	Victoria Camp	2,160	49.9	
Conservative	Sameh Hindi	1,952	45.1	
Labour	Edward Massey	966	22.3	
Liberal Democrats	Matt Bellard	909	21.0	
Liberal Democrats	Lois Speller	870	20.1	
Labour	Mark Player	854	19.7	
Liberal Democrats	Matt Klesel	838	19.4	
Green	Antony Lane	779	18.0	
UKIP	John Theedom	766	17.7	
Independent	Michael Boyd	546	12.6	
Turnout			68.0	
Conservative hold				
Conservative hold				
Conservative hold				

=== Moulsham Lodge ===
Moulsham Lodge
Party	Candidate	Votes	%	±%
Conservative	Simon Cook	1,252	47.2	
Liberal Democrats	Mark Springett	962	36.3	
Liberal Democrats	David Jones	891	33.6	
Conservative	Gilbert Smith	875	33.0	
UKIP	Hilary Stockwell	491	18.5	
Labour	Max Gibson	313	11.8	
Labour	Angela Medici	307	11.6	
Green	Andrew Abbott	208	7.8	
Turnout			72.0	
Conservative gain from Liberal Democrats				
Liberal Democrats hold				

=== Patching Hall ===
Patching Hall
Party	Candidate	Votes	%	±%
Conservative	Jon De Vries	1,754	43.8	
Liberal Democrats	Stephen Robinson	1,580	39.5	
Conservative	Michael Holoway	1,554	38.8	
Liberal Democrats	Christopher Davidson	1,456	36.4	
Conservative	Neil Spooner	1,414	35.3	
Liberal Democrats	David Everest-Ring	1,293	32.3	
Labour	Joan Bliss	862	21.5	
UKIP	Mark Rose	775	19.4	
Labour	Stuart Hatwell	680	17.0	
Labour	David Howell	642	16.0	
Turnout			67.0	
Conservative gain from Liberal Democrats				
Liberal Democrats hold				
Conservative gain from Liberal Democrats				

=== Rettendon and Runwell ===
Rettendon and Runwell
Party	Candidate	Votes	%	±%
Conservative	Ray Ride	1,610	56.7	
Conservative	Lance Millane	1,568	55.2	
UKIP	Chris Cheater	902	31.7	
UKIP	Paul Clark	887	31.2	
Labour	John Duffy	310	10.9	
Green	Matthew Oliver	229	8.1	
Liberal Democrats	Daisy Nunn	94	3.3	
Liberal Democrats	Paul Bentham	82	2.9	
Turnout			72.0	
Conservative hold				
Conservative hold				

=== South Hanningfield, Stock and Margaretting ===
South Hanningfield, Stock and Margaretting
Party	Candidate	Votes	%	±%
Conservative	Roy Whitehead	2,025	74.3	
Conservative	Ian Grundy	1,988	73.0	
UKIP	Barry Batson	736	27.0	
Labour	Robert Jones	297	10.9	
Liberal Democrats	Kenneth Hay	225	8.3	
Liberal Democrats	Lester Wakeling	178	6.5	
Turnout			74.0	
Conservative hold				
Conservative hold				

=== South Woodham - Chetwood and Collingwood ===
South Woodham - Chetwood and Collingwood
Party	Candidate	Votes	%	±%
Conservative	Robert Massey	1,991	67.6	
Conservative	Ashley John	1,811	61.5	
Conservative	Malcolm Sismey	1,640	55.7	
SWFCTA	Jill Winn	885	30.1	
SWFCTA	Lawrence Brennan	881	29.9	
SWFCTA	Roy Hardman	724	24.6	
Labour	Darek Barnett	520	17.7	
Green	David Rey	381	12.9	
Turnout			64.0	
Conservative hold				
Conservative hold				
Conservative hold				

=== South Woodham - Elmwood and Woodville ===
South Woodham - Elmwood and Woodville
Party	Candidate	Votes	%	±%
Conservative	Bob Denston	1,841	55.7	
Conservative	Linda Denston	1,734	52.4	
Conservative	Trica Hughes	1,649	49.8	
SWFCTA	Sam Coley	1,115	33.7	
SWFCTA	Ian Roberts	992	30.0	
SWFCTA	Kevin Golding	872	26.4	
UKIP	Janet Jones	868	26.2	
Labour	Clifford Vanner	448	13.5	
Labour	Margaret Vanner	405	12.2	
Turnout			66.0	
Conservative hold				
Conservative hold				
Conservative hold				

=== Springfield North ===
Springfield North
Party	Candidate	Votes	%	±%
Conservative	Paul Hutchinson	1,955	51.8	
Conservative	Susan Sullivan	1,590	42.1	
Conservative	Louis Ward	1,385	36.7	
Liberal Democrats	Michael Mackrory	1,340	35.5	
Liberal Democrats	Ian Fuller	1,317	34.9	
Liberal Democrats	Martin Rew	1,068	28.3	
UKIP	David Flower	797	21.1	
Labour	Evelyn Haigh	659	17.5	
Labour	Karen Kennedy	632	16.7	
Labour	Russell Kennedy	585	15.5	
Turnout			67.0	
Conservative hold				
Conservative gain from Liberal Democrats				
Conservative gain from Liberal Democrats				

=== St. Andrew's ===
St. Andrew's
Party	Candidate	Votes	%	±%
Conservative	Peter Cousins	1,556	42.0	
Conservative	Stephen Fowell	1,345	36.3	
Liberal Democrats	Lee Ashley	1,275	34.4	
Conservative	Michael Wetton	1,215	32.8	
Liberal Democrats	John Hunnable	1,175	31.7	
Liberal Democrats	Tom Willis	936	25.3	
Labour	Paul Bishop	856	23.1	
UKIP	Thomas Jones	854	23.1	
Labour	Linda Findlay	783	21.1	
Labour	John Knott	743	20.1	
Green	Colin Budgey	370	10.0	
Turnout			65.0	
Conservative hold				
Conservative gain from Liberal Democrats				
Liberal Democrats hold				

=== The Lawns ===
The Lawns
Party	Candidate	Votes	%	±%
Conservative	Christine Garrett	1,459	50.5	
Conservative	Julia Jeapes	1,284	44.4	
Liberal Democrats	Richard Lee	1,101	38.1	
Liberal Democrats	Robin Stevens	1,044	36.1	
Labour	Roger Patterson	328	11.4	
Labour	Steven Haigh	325	11.2	
Green	David Cochrane	237	8.2	
Turnout			76.0	
Conservative hold				
Conservative hold				

=== Trinity ===
Trinity
Party	Candidate	Votes	%	±%
Conservative	Jean Murray	1,622	56.9	
Conservative	Graham Seeley	1,232	43.2	
Liberal Democrats	Julia Frascona	784	27.5	
Liberal Democrats	Tim Rothwell	714	25.1	
Labour	Elaine Baldwin	547	19.2	
Labour	Jon Legg	477	16.7	
Green	George Malynicz	321	11.3	
Turnout			70.0	
Conservative hold				
Conservative hold				

=== Waterhouse Farm ===
Waterhouse Farm
Party	Candidate	Votes	%	±%
Conservative	Alan Chambers	1,194	45.3	
Conservative	Malcolm Watson	1,023	38.8	
Labour	Peter Dixon	687	26.1	
Liberal Democrats	Lorraine Cobbold	629	23.9	
Labour	Colin Farquhar	602	22.8	
UKIP	Marion Harvey	597	22.6	
Liberal Democrats	Ian Gale	539	20.4	
Turnout			65.0	
Conservative hold				
Conservative hold				

=== Writtle ===
Writtle
Party	Candidate	Votes	%	±%
Conservative	Tim Roper	1,592	62.6	
Conservative	Tony Sach	1,344	52.8	
Liberal Democrats	Angela Robinson	883	34.7	
Liberal Democrats	David King	720	28.3	
UKIP	Ian Nicholls	551	21.7	
Turnout			71.0	
Conservative hold				
Conservative hold				

== By-elections ==
=== Moulsham & Central ===
Caused by the resignation of Cllr Victoria Camp.

Moulsham & Central: 4 May 2017
Party	Candidate	Votes	%	±%
Conservative	Gilbert Smith	1,108	40.7	+4.2
Liberal Democrats	Graham Pooley	992	36.5	+22.3
Labour	Edward Massey	411	15.1	−1.5
Green	Tony Lane	210	7.7	−4.5
Majority		116	4.2	
Turnout		2,721		
Conservative hold		Swing	▼9.1	
