= 1983 Chelmsford Borough Council election =

UK local election

- 5 May 1983

All 60 seats to Chelmsford Borough Council 31 seats needed for a majority

	First party	Second party
Party	Alliance	Conservative
Seats won	31	26
Seat change	▲12	▼10
Popular vote	57,954	52,304
Percentage	48.7%	44.0%
Swing	▲13.0%	▼1.9%
	Third party	Fourth party
Party	Independent	Labour
Seats won	3	0
Seat change	▲1	▼3
Popular vote	2,110	6,534
Percentage	1.8%	5.5%
Swing	▼1.4%	▼9.5%
- Winner of each seat at the 1983 Chelmsford Borough Council election.
Council control before election
Conservative
Council control after election
Alliance

The 1983 Chelmsford Borough Council election took place on 5 May 1983 to elect members of Chelmsford Borough Council in Essex, England. This was on the same day as other local elections.

== Summary ==
=== Election result ===
1983 Chelmsford Borough Council election
Party	Candidates	Seats	Gains	Losses	Net gain/loss	Seats %	Votes %	Votes	+/−
Alliance	59	31			▲12	51.7	48.7	57,954	+13.0
Conservative	60	26			▼10	43.3	44.0	52,304	–1.9
Independent	5	3			▲1	5.0	1.8	2,110	–1.4
Labour	25	0			▼3	0.0	5.5	6,534	–9.5
Communist	1	0			Steady	0.0	<0.1	59	–0.1
SDP	1	0			Steady	0.0	<0.1	15	N/A
