= 1987 Chelmsford Borough Council election =

1987 English local election

- 7 May 1987

All 56 seats to Chelmsford Borough Council 29 seats needed for a majority

	First party	Second party	Third party
Party	Alliance	Conservative	Independent
Seats won	29	24	3
Seat change	▼2	▼2	Steady
Popular vote	58,327	57,552	2,231
Percentage	44.9%	44.3%	1.7%
Swing	▼3.8%	▲0.3%	▼0.1%
- Winner of each seat at the 1987 Chelmsford Borough Council election.
Council control before election
Alliance
Council control after election
Alliance

The 1987 Chelmsford City Council election took place on 7 May 1987 to elect members of Chelmsford Borough Council in Essex, England. This was on the same day as other local elections.

The council was contested on new ward boundaries, decreasing the number of seats by 4 to 56.

== Summary ==
=== Election result ===
1987 Chelmsford Borough Council election
Party	Candidates	Seats	Gains	Losses	Net gain/loss	Seats %	Votes %	Votes	+/−
Alliance	54	29			▼2	51.8	44.9	58,327	–3.8
Conservative	56	24			▼2	42.9	44.3	57,552	+0.3
Independent	3	3			Steady	5.4	1.7	2,231	–0.1
Labour	48	0			Steady	0.0	9.1	11,793	+3.6
