= 2011 Chelmsford Borough Council election =

2011 UK local government election

- 5 May 2011

All 57 seats to Chelmsford Borough Council 29 seats needed for a majority
	First party	Second party
Party	Conservative	Liberal Democrats
Last election	33	24
Seats before	33	24
Seats won	40	15
Seat change	▲7	▼9
Popular vote	29,163	14,548
Percentage	50.3%	25.1%
Swing	▼2.7%	▼7.9%
	Third party	Fourth party
Party	Labour	Independent
Last election	0	0
Seats before	0	0
Seats won	1	1
Seat change	▲1	▲1
Popular vote	9,684	1,208
Percentage	16.7%	2.1%
Swing	▲6.3%	▲1.2%

Elections to Chelmsford Borough Council were held in 2011 alongside local elections in other parts of the United Kingdom.

== Election results ==
Chelmsford Borough Council election, 2011
Party	Seats	Gains	Losses	Net gain/loss	Seats %	Votes %	Votes	+/−
Conservative	40			▲7		50.3	29,163	▼2.7
Liberal Democrats	15			▼9		25.1	14,548	▼8.1
Labour	1			▲1		16.7	9,684	▲6.3
SWFTCA	0			Steady		2.9	1,680	New
Independent	1			▲1		2.1	1,208	▲1.2
Green	0			Steady		1.9	1,105	▲0.7
UKIP	0			Steady		1.1	636	▼0.1

== Ward results ==
=== Bicknacre and East & West Hanningfield ===
Bicknacre and East & West Hanningfield
Party	Candidate	Votes	%	±%
Conservative	Richard Poulter	1,322		
Conservative	Michael Harris	1,279		
Labour	Frank Harris	298		
Labour	Anthony Lees	281		
Liberal Democrats	Frank Butler	225		
Liberal Democrats	David Whiteing	216		
Majority				
Turnout				
Conservative hold		Swing		
Conservative hold		Swing		

=== Boreham and The Leighs ===
Boreham and The Leighs
Party	Candidate	Votes	%	±%
Conservative	John Galley	1,288		
Conservative	Philip Watson	1,040		
Labour	Kevin Adair	355		
Labour	Raymond Barry	337		
Liberal Democrats	Nathan Lagden	245		
Liberal Democrats	Jennifer Goldfinch	236		
Majority				
Turnout				
Conservative hold		Swing		
Conservative hold		Swing		

=== Broomfield and The Walthams ===
Broomfield and The Walthams
Party	Candidate	Votes	%	±%
Conservative	Brian Patient	1,278		
Conservative	Sandra Pontin	1,145		
Independent	Delmas Ashford	1,065		
Conservative	James Raven	923		
Liberal Democrats	Malcolm Taylor	785		
Liberal Democrats	Lorraine Cobbold	500		
Liberal Democrats	Janice Farn	492		
Green	Shah Hossain	373		
Labour	Brian Goodwin	348		
Labour	Roy Chad	341		
Labour	James Fourt	324		
Majority				
Turnout				
Conservative hold		Swing		
Conservative hold		Swing		
Independent gain from Conservative		Swing		

=== Chelmer Village and Beaulieu Park ===
Chelmer Village and Beaulieu Park
Party	Candidate	Votes	%	±%
Conservative	Ronald Alcock	2,155		
Conservative	Neil Gulliver	2,047		
Conservative	Duncan Lumley	2,017		
Labour	Colin Farquhur	595		
Labour	Max Gibson	564		
Labour	Paul Walentowicz	504		
Liberal Democrats	Mary Bastick	412		
Liberal Democrats	Lester Wakeling	375		
Liberal Democrats	Richard Pennicard	353		
Majority				
Turnout				
Conservative hold		Swing		
Conservative hold		Swing		
Conservative hold		Swing		

=== Chelmsford Rural West ===
Chelmsford Rural West
Party	Candidate	Votes	%	±%
Conservative	Nicolette Chambers	940		
Liberal Democrats	Angela Robertson	141		
Labour	Philip Gaudin	115		
Majority				
Turnout				
Conservative hold		Swing		

=== Galleywood ===
Gallywood
Party	Candidate	Votes	%	±%
Conservative	Janette Potter	1,230		
Conservative	David Stevenson	1,091		
Labour	Richard Hyland	435		
Labour	Daniel Ebdon	353		
Liberal Democrats	Andrew Robson	279		
Liberal Democrats	Christine Shaw	264		
Majority				
Turnout				
Conservative hold		Swing		
Conservative hold		Swing		

=== Goat Hill ===
Goat Hill
Party	Candidate	Votes	%	±%
Liberal Democrats	Freda Mountain	963		
Liberal Democrats	Linda Mascot	908		
Conservative	Katherine Joel	850		
Conservative	Louis Ward	777		
Labour	Susan Leslie	222		
Labour	Mark Player	219		
Majority				
Turnout				
Liberal Democrats hold		Swing		
Liberal Democrats hold		Swing		

=== Great Baddow East ===
Great Baddow East
Party	Candidate	Votes	%	±%
Liberal Democrats	Trevor Miller	1,260		
Liberal Democrats	Christine Rycroft	1,229		
Liberal Democrats	Andrew Sosin	1,215		
Conservative	Stephanie Scott	1,073		
Conservative	Yvonne Spence	1,059		
Conservative	Ernest von Tromp	952		
Labour	Helen Ephraim	425		
Labour	James Glider	395		
UKIP	Jesse Pryke	395		
Labour	Matthew Russell	393		
Majority				
Turnout				
Liberal Democrats hold		Swing		
Liberal Democrats hold		Swing		
Liberal Democrats hold		Swing		

=== Great Baddow West ===
Great Baddow West
Party	Candidate	Votes	%	±%
Conservative	Jennifer Chandler	866		
Conservative	Robert Villa	722		
Liberal Democrats	Veronica Sadowsky	607		
Liberal Democrats	Jannetta Sosin	607		
Labour	John Devine	279		
UKIP	Jeanette Howes	241		
Labour	William Horslen	220		
Majority				
Turnout				
Conservative gain from Liberal Democrats		Swing		
Conservative gain from Liberal Democrats		Swing		

=== The Lawns ===
The Lawns
Party	Candidate	Votes	%	±%
Conservative	Robert Burgoyne	1,078		
Conservative	Christine Garrett	1,074		
Liberal Democrats	Robin Stevens	950		
Liberal Democrats	Rosalind Webb	888		
Labour	Susan O'Brian	262		
Labour	Roger Patterson	249		
Majority				
Turnout				
Conservative gain from Liberal Democrats		Swing		
Conservative gain from Liberal Democrats		Swing		

=== Little Baddow, Danbury and Sandon ===
Little Baddow, Danbury and Sandon
Party	Candidate	Votes	%	±%
Conservative	Robert Shepherd	2,280		
Conservative	Ian Wright	2,264		
Conservative	Christopher Kingsley	2,263		
Liberal Democrats	Lawrence O'Brien	455		
Green	Colin Budgey	449		
Labour	Diana Smith	374		
Liberal Democrats	Andrew Bell	327		
Labour	Alan Carpenter	303		
Liberal Democrats	Paul Moore	284		
Labour	Donald Newton	266		
Majority				
Turnout				
Conservative hold		Swing		
Conservative hold		Swing		
Conservative hold		Swing		

=== Marconi ===
Marconi
Party	Candidate	Votes	%	±%
Liberal Democrats	Judith Deakin	641		
Labour	Christopher Fegan	610		
Liberal Democrats	Graham Pooley	582		
Labour	Christopher Vince	554		
Conservative	Michael McCullough	526		
Conservative	Timothy Worrall	485		
Majority				
Turnout				
Liberal Democrats hold		Swing		
Labour gain from Liberal Democrats		Swing		

=== Moulsham and Central ===
Moulsham and Central
Party	Candidate	Votes	%	±%
Conservative	Victoria Irwin	1,496		
Conservative	Richard Madden	1,456		
Conservative	Sameh Hindi	1,411		
Liberal Democrats	Ben Wright	1,000		
Liberal Democrats	David Balding	998		
Liberal Democrats	Lois Speller	964		
Labour	Prudence Jones	702		
Labour	John Leslie	652		
Labour	Robert Jones	648		
Majority				
Turnout				
Conservative hold		Swing		
Conservative hold		Swing		
Conservative hold		Swing		

=== Moulsham Lodge ===
Moulsham Lodge
Party	Candidate	Votes	%	±%
Liberal Democrats	David Jones	845		
Liberal Democrats	Mark Springett	806		
Conservative	Iain Miller	754		
Conservative	Mary Dearden	698		
Labour	Daniel Roberts	328		
Labour	Samuel Bikwa	304		
Majority				
Turnout				
Liberal Democrats hold		Swing		
Liberal Democrats hold		Swing		

=== Patching Hall ===
Patching Hall
Party	Candidate	Votes	%	±%
Liberal Democrats	Thomas Smith-Hughes	1,307		
Liberal Democrats	Alan Arnot	1,230		
Liberal Democrats	Stephen Robinson	1,116		
Conservative	Peter Driscoll	1,072		
Conservative	Stephen Fowell	1,053		
Conservative	Graham Seeley	1,000		
Labour	Joan Bliss	592		
Labour	David Howell	500		
Labour	Ernest Webb	449		
Green	Angela Thompson	283		
Independent	Ashley Final	143		
Majority				
Turnout				
Liberal Democrats hold		Swing		
Liberal Democrats hold		Swing		
Liberal Democrats hold		Swing		

=== Rettendon and Runwell ===
Rettendon and Runwell
Party	Candidate	Votes	%	±%
Conservative	Raymond Ride	1,470		
Conservative	Lance Millane	1,444		
Labour	Glenys Chatterley	232		
Labour	John Duffy	231		
Liberal Democrats	Timothy Rothwell	111		
Liberal Democrats	Ryan Wakeling	94		
Majority				
Turnout				
Conservative hold		Swing		
Conservative hold		Swing		

=== St. Andrew's ===
St. Andrew's
Party	Candidate	Votes	%	±%
Conservative	Peter Cousins	1,043		
Liberal Democrats	John Hunnable	1,034		
Liberal Democrats	Gloria Nichols	987		
Conservative	John Pontin	938		
Conservative	Neil Spooner	893		
Liberal Democrats	Thomas Willis	886		
Labour	Hannah Elgie	749		
Labour	Peter Dixon	731		
Labour	John Knott	691		
Majority				
Turnout				
Conservative gain from Liberal Democrats		Swing		
Liberal Democrats hold		Swing		
Liberal Democrats hold		Swing		

=== South Hanningfield, Stock and Margaretting ===
South Hanningfield, Stock and Margaretting
Party	Candidate	Votes	%	±%
Conservative	Ian Grundy	1,734		
Conservative	Roy Whitehead	1,616		
Labour	Joyce Lees	252		
Labour	Margaret Vanner	214		
Liberal Democrats	John Masek	178		
Liberal Democrats	Ayman Syed	122		
Majority				
Turnout				
Conservative hold		Swing		
Conservative hold		Swing		

=== South Woodham - Chetwood and Collingwood ===
South Woodham - Chetwood and Collingwood
Party	Candidate	Votes	%	±%
Conservative	Ashley John	1,325		
Conservative	Robert Massey	1,300		
Conservative	Malcolm Sismey	1,231		
SWFCTA	Lawrence Brennan	766		
Labour	Clifford Vanner	669		
SWFCTA	Christine Weir-Ewing	609		
SWFCTA	Richard Weir-Ewing	515		
Labour	Stephanie Troop	233		
Labour	Jeffrey Mushens	225		
Liberal Democrats	Noel Sutcliffe	188		
Majority				
Turnout				
Conservative hold		Swing		
Conservative hold		Swing		
Conservative hold		Swing		

=== South Woodham - Elmwood and Woodville ===
South Woodham - Elmwood and Woodville
Party	Candidate	Votes	%	±%
Conservative	Robert Denston	1,170		
Conservative	Patricia Hughes	1,145		
Conservative	Maureen Moulds	1,110		
SWFCTA	Jacqueline Birch	914		
SWFCTA	Ian Roberts	887		
SWFCTA	Keith Miles	807		
Labour	Alice Duffy	222		
Labour	Roger Fellows	211		
Labour	Sarah Haigh	197		
Liberal Democrats	David Sykes	154		
Majority				
Turnout				
Conservative hold		Swing		
Conservative hold		Swing		
Conservative hold		Swing		

=== Springfield North ===
Springfield North
Party	Candidate	Votes	%	±%
Conservative	Paul Hutchinson	1,150		
Liberal Democrats	Pamela Lane	1,094		
Liberal Democrats	Ian Fuller	1,088		
Liberal Democrats	Michael Mackroy	1,082		
Conservative	Graham McGhie	1,028		
Conservative	John Scott	973		
Labour	Karen Kennedy	469		
Labour	Evelyn Haigh	452		
Labour	Russell Kennedy	433		
Majority				
Turnout				
Conservative gain from Liberal Democrats		Swing		
Liberal Democrats hold		Swing		
Liberal Democrats hold		Swing		

=== Trinity ===
Trinity
Party	Candidate	Votes	%	±%
Conservative	Julie Maybrick	1,041		
Conservative	Jean Murray	981		
Liberal Democrats	Martin Bracken	683		
Liberal Democrats	Richard Lee	614		
Labour	Jennie Duffy	315		
Labour	Jonathan Legg	288		
Majority				
Turnout				
Conservative hold		Swing		
Conservative hold		Swing		

=== Waterhouse Farm ===
Waterhouse Farm
Party	Candidate	Votes	%	±%
Conservative	Malcolm Watson	753		
Conservative	Alan Chambers	752		
Liberal Democrats	Donald Bacon	724		
Liberal Democrats	Eileen Moxon	681		
Labour	Maurice Fegan	412		
Labour	Maria Fegan	400		
Majority				
Turnout				
Conservative gain from Liberal Democrats		Swing		
Conservative gain from Liberal Democrats		Swing		

=== Writtle ===
Writtle
Party	Candidate	Votes	%	±%
Conservative	Timothy Ryder	1,269		
Conservative	Anthony Sach	1,237		
Labour	David Acock	424		
Labour	Peter Illman	413		
Liberal Democrats	Kelvin Leeds	267		
Liberal Democrats	Simon Jones	242		
Majority				
Turnout				
Conservative hold		Swing		
Conservative hold		Swing		

== By-elections ==
Patching Hall By-Election 28 June 2012
Party	Candidate	Votes	%	±%
Liberal Democrats	Paul Bentham	842	42.4	+3.9
Conservative	Stephen Fowell	488	24.6	−7.0
Labour	Chris Vince	309	15.6	−1.8
UKIP	Ian Nicholls	263	13.2	+13.2
Green	Reza Hossain	84	4.2	−4.1
Majority		354	17.8	
Turnout		1,986		
Liberal Democrats hold		Swing		

Broomfield and The Walthams By-Election 19 February 2013
Party	Candidate	Votes	%	±%
Liberal Democrats	Graham Pooley	543	38.2	+17.8
Conservative	William Wetton	423	29.7	−3.5
UKIP	Ian Nicholls	280	19.7	+19.7
Labour	Sinead Jein	129	9.1	+0.1
Green	Reza Hossain	47	3.3	−6.4
Majority		120	8.4	
Turnout		1,422		
Liberal Democrats gain from Independent		Swing		

South Woodham - Elmwood and Woodville By-Election 5 December 2013
Party	Candidate	Votes	%	±%
SWFCTA	Ian Roberts	281	31.4	−5.8
Conservative	Linda Denston	275	30.8	−16.8
UKIP	Ian Nicholls	249	27.9	+27.9
Labour	Derek Barnett	65	7.3	−1.7
Liberal Democrats	Jeni Goldfinch	24	2.7	−3.6
Majority		6	0.7	
Turnout		894		
SWFCTA gain from Conservative		Swing		

Bicknacre and East and West Hanningfield By-Election 9 October 2014
Party	Candidate	Votes	%	±%
Conservative	Matt Flack	649	56.1	−15.6
UKIP	David Kirkwood	359	31.0	+31.0
Labour	Tony Lees	80	6.9	−9.3
Green	Reza Hossain	35	3.0	+3.0
Liberal Democrats	Andy Robson	34	2.9	−9.3
Majority		290	25.1	
Turnout		1,157		
Conservative hold		Swing		
