= 1976 Chelmsford Borough Council election =

1976 English local election

- 6 May 1976

All 60 seats to Chelmsford Borough Council 31 seats needed for a majority

	First party	Second party
Party	Conservative	Liberal
Seats won	46	9
Seat change	▲16	▲1
Popular vote	43,544	21,526
Percentage	49.9%	24.7%
Swing	▲10.2%	▲9.6%
	Third party	Fourth party
Party	Labour	Independent
Seats won	3	2
Seat change	▼13	▼4
Popular vote	19,651	2,532
Percentage	22.5%	2.9%
Swing	▼21.0%	▲1.6%
- Winner of each seat at the 1976 Chelmsford Borough Council election.
Council control before election
No overall control
Council control after election
Conservative

The 1976 Chelmsford Borough Council election took place on 6 May 1976 to elect members of Chelmsford Borough Council in Essex, England. This was on the same day as other local elections.

The council was contested under new ward boundaries, but the number of seats remained the same.

== Summary ==
=== Election result ===
1976 Chelmsford Borough Council election
Party	Candidates	Seats	Gains	Losses	Net gain/loss	Seats %	Votes %	Votes	+/−
Conservative	60	46			▲16	76.7	49.9	43,544	+10.2
Liberal	46	9			▲1	15.0	24.7	21,526	+9.6
Labour	44	3			▼13	5.0	22.5	19,651	–21.0
Independent	6	2			▼4	3.3	2.9	2,532	+1.6
