= 2003 Chelmsford Borough Council election =

UK local election

- 1 May 2003

All 57 seats to Chelmsford Borough Council 29 seats needed for a majority
	First party	Second party
Party	Conservative	Liberal Democrats
Last election	21	28
Seats before	21	28
Seats won	35	20
Seat change	▲14	▼8
Popular vote	41,766	31,150
Percentage	48.1%	35.8%
Swing	▲10.9%	▼2.1%
	Third party	Fourth party
Party	Labour	Independent
Last election	5	2
Seats before	5	2
Seats won	2	0
Seat change	▼3	▼2
Popular vote	11,484	1,878
Percentage	13.2%	2.2%
Swing	▼8.5%	▲0.3%

The 2003 Chelmsford Borough Council election took place on 1 May 2003 to elect members of Chelmsford Borough Council in England. This was on the same day as other local elections.

There were boundary changes across the council area resulting in new wards being created. The number of seats on the council was increased from 56 to 57 seats.

== Results summary ==
2003 Chelmsford Borough Council election
Party	Seats	Gains	Losses	Net gain/loss	Seats %	Votes %	Votes	+/−
Conservative	35	7	0	▲14	61.4	48.1	41,766	+10.9
Liberal Democrats	20	3	6	▼8	35.1	35.8	31,150	-2.1
Labour	2	0	3	▼3	3.5	13.2	11,484	-8.5
Independent	0	0	1	▼2	0.0	2.2	1,878	+0.3
Green	0	0	0	Steady	0.0	0.7	643	-0.5

== Ward results ==
=== Bicknacre & East & West Hanningfield ===
Bicknacre & East & West Hanningfield
Party	Candidate	Votes	%
Conservative	Richard Poulter	734	48.5
Conservative	Ronald Saunders	667	44.1
Independent	Alan Dixon	474	31.3
Liberal Democrats	David Whiteing	331	21.9
Independent	Edward Williamson	177	11.7
Labour	Hilary Chad	147	9.7
Labour	Paul Matthews	103	6.8
Turnout		1,514	36.8
Conservative win (new seat)			
Conservative win (new seat)			

=== Boreham & The Leighs ===
Boreham & The Leighs
Party	Candidate	Votes	%
Conservative	John Galley	848	69.5
Conservative	Philip Wilson	652	53.4
Liberal Democrats	Sarah MacKrory	300	24.6
Liberal Democrats	Vivienne Davies	232	19.0
Labour	Timothy MacGregor	153	12.5
Turnout		1,220	30.0
Conservative win (new seat)			
Conservative win (new seat)			

=== Broomfield & The Walthams ===
Broomfield & The Walthams
Party	Candidate	Votes	%
Conservative	Delmas Ashford	1,245	59.8
Conservative	Alan Willsher	1,123	53.9
Conservative	Jason Need	1,040	50.0
Liberal Democrats	Graham Pooley	714	34.3
Liberal Democrats	Anna-Marie Broadhead	574	27.6
Liberal Democrats	Deborah Richardson	564	27.1
Labour	Michael Powell	243	11.7
Labour	William Evans	200	9.6
Labour	Andrew Dearman	191	9.2
Turnout		2,082	34.0
Conservative win (new seat)			
Conservative win (new seat)			
Conservative win (new seat)			

=== Chelmer Village & Beaulieu Park ===
Chelmer Village & Beaulieu Park
Party	Candidate	Votes	%
Conservative	Duncan Lumley	977	65.7
Conservative	Ronald Alcock	966	64.9
Conservative	Neil Gulliver	901	60.6
Liberal Democrats	Robert Webb	345	23.2
Liberal Democrats	John Styles	319	21.4
Liberal Democrats	Andrew Robson	288	19.4
Labour	James Russell	218	14.7
Turnout		1,488	21.6
Conservative win (new seat)			
Conservative win (new seat)			
Conservative win (new seat)			

=== Chelmsford Rural West ===
Chelmsford Rural West
Party	Candidate	Votes	%
Conservative	Nicolette Chambers	586	57.5
Liberal Democrats	Philip Evans	364	35.7
Labour	Barry Williams	69	6.8
Majority		222	21.8
Turnout		1,019	46.0
Conservative win (new seat)			

=== Galleywood ===
Galleywood
Party	Candidate	Votes	%
Conservative	Janette Potter	868	61.5
Conservative	David Stevenson	841	59.6
Liberal Democrats	John Mountain	264	18.7
Labour	Roger Patterson	264	18.7
Labour	Muriel Briault	261	18.5
Liberal Democrats	James Hutchon	231	16.4
Turnout		1,412	30.1
Conservative win (new seat)			
Conservative win (new seat)			

=== Goat Hall ===
Goat Hall
Party	Candidate	Votes	%
Liberal Democrats	Freda Mountain	824	61.0
Liberal Democrats	John Williams	734	54.3
Conservative	Vernon Makin	411	30.4
Conservative	Susan Ford-Sumner	398	29.5
Labour	Brian Whitelaw	167	12.4
Turnout		1,351	29.9
Liberal Democrats hold			
Liberal Democrats hold			

=== Great Baddow East ===
Great Baddow East
Party	Candidate	Votes	%
Liberal Democrats	Christine Rycroft	1,081	56.4
Liberal Democrats	Trevor Miller	1,071	55.9
Liberal Democrats	Andrew Sosin	1,052	54.9
Conservative	Kenneth Carr	628	32.8
Conservative	Peter Martin	602	31.4
Conservative	Ivy Day	588	30.7
Labour	Carol Kemp	184	9.6
Labour	David Laing	145	7.6
Labour	Ernest Webb	127	6.6
Turnout		1,915	29.9
Liberal Democrats win (new seat)			
Liberal Democrats win (new seat)			
Liberal Democrats win (new seat)			

=== Great Baddow West ===
Great Baddow West
Party	Candidate	Votes	%
Liberal Democrats	Margaret Hutchon	618	57.4
Liberal Democrats	Janetta Sosin	587	54.6
Conservative	Peter Hindle	326	30.3
Conservative	Roy Moore	323	30.0
Labour	Joanna Grindrod	126	11.7
Labour	Kerry Abel	117	10.9
Turnout		1,076	27.4
Liberal Democrats win (new seat)			
Liberal Democrats win (new seat)			

=== The Lawns ===
The Lawns
Party	Candidate	Votes	%	±%
Liberal Democrats	Philip Harvey	787	46.7	−11.1
Conservative	Yvonne Spence	779	46.2	+17.6
Conservative	Pamela Joughin	767	45.5	+17.7
Liberal Democrats	Anthony Hall	713	42.3	−11.5
Labour	Robert Miller	108	6.4	−7.0
Labour	Alan Rigg	90	5.3	−7.2
Green	Eleanor Burgess	65	3.9	N/A
Turnout		1,687	38.6	+0.2
Liberal Democrats hold				
Conservative gain from Liberal Democrats				

=== Little Baddow, Danbury & Sandon ===
Little Baddow, Danbury & Sandon
Party	Candidate	Votes	%	±%
Conservative	Maurice Hurrell	1,343	69.4	+11.3
Conservative	Ian Wright	1,327	68.5	+11.7
Conservative	Christopher Kingsley	1,306	67.5	+10.3
Liberal Democrats	Lawrence O'Brien	388	20.0	−1.6
Green	Colin Budgey	350	18.1	+10.7
Liberal Democrats	Paul Chaplin	250	12.9	−11.3
Liberal Democrats	Lester Crichton	235	12.1	−6.8
Labour	Donald Newton	152	7.9	−2.5
Turnout		1,936	29.7	−3.3
Conservative hold				
Conservative hold				
Conservative hold				

=== Marconi ===
Marconi
Party	Candidate	Votes	%
Labour	William Horslen	432	50.9
Labour	Adrian Longden	400	47.2
Conservative	Clive Hodges	261	30.8
Conservative	Jennifer Alefounder	236	27.8
Liberal Democrats	Richard Pennicard	111	13.1
Liberal Democrats	Susan Harvey	110	13.0
Turnout		848	17.9
Labour win (new seat)			
Labour win (new seat)			

=== Moulsham & Central ===
Moulsham & Central
Party	Candidate	Votes	%
Conservative	David Lee	921	40.2
Conservative	Timothy Worrall	906	39.5
Conservative	Sameh Hindi	860	37.5
Liberal Democrats	Peter Brooks	824	36.0
Liberal Democrats	Keith Francis	794	34.6
Liberal Democrats	Clive Secluna	746	32.5
Labour	Patrick Baldwin	463	20.2
Labour	Robert Jones	442	19.3
Labour	Peter Dixon	427	18.6
Independent	Stepen Stratton	201	8.8
Turnout		2,292	31.8
Conservative win (new seat)			
Conservative win (new seat)			
Conservative win (new seat)			

=== Moulsham Lodge ===
Moulsham Lodge
Party	Candidate	Votes	%	±%
Liberal Democrats	Philip Firth	884	66.1	+1.4
Liberal Democrats	David Jones	814	60.9	+2.1
Conservative	Pauline Hepworth	340	25.4	+5.1
Conservative	David Kimberlin	329	24.6	+6.3
Labour	Frederick Grindrod	180	13.5	−2.0
Labour	John Knott	158	11.8	−0.7
Turnout		1,337	31.6	−3.9
Liberal Democrats hold				
Liberal Democrats hold				

=== Patching Hall ===
Patching Hall
Party	Candidate	Votes	%	±%
Liberal Democrats	Thomas Smith-Hughes	857	44.2	+0.2
Liberal Democrats	Alan Arnot	797	41.1	−0.4
Liberal Democrats	Peter Charman	747	38.5	−1.3
Conservative	Richard Campion	712	36.7	−1.3
Conservative	Michael McCullough	678	34.9	+4.8
Conservative	Nicholas Stevenson	669	34.5	+5.6
Labour	Roy Chad	364	18.8	−3.9
Labour	David Howell	326	16.8	−4.3
Labour	Sean O'Sullivan	309	15.9	−4.4
Green	Angela Thomson	160	8.2	+2.1
Turnout		1,940	27.9	−0.8
Liberal Democrats hold				
Liberal Democrats hold				
Liberal Democrats hold				

=== Rettendon & Runwell ===
Rettendon & Runwell
Party	Candidate	Votes	%	±%
Conservative	John Little	901	66.1	+13.1
Conservative	Raymond Ride	817	59.9	+10.5
Independent	Eileen Mickleborough	446	32.7	N/A
Liberal Democrats	Benjamin Owen	196	14.4	−2.4
Turnout		1,363	34.0	+9.0
Conservative hold				
Conservative hold				

=== St. Andrew's ===
St. Andrew's
Party	Candidate	Votes	%	±%
Liberal Democrats	Simon Jones	1,083	48.3	+20.2
Liberal Democrats	John Trustrum	1,032	46.0	+18.4
Liberal Democrats	Thomas Willis	1,005	44.8	+18.7
Labour	Elaine Baldwin	698	31.1	−15.3
Labour	John Devane	661	29.5	−14.5
Labour	Russell Kennedy	643	28.7	−14.9
Conservative	John Candler	481	21.4	−1.5
Conservative	Kathleen Pauley	476	21.2	−1.5
Conservative	Patricia Marchand	462	20.6	−1.1
Turnout		2,244	32.8	−1.5
Liberal Democrats gain from Labour				
Liberal Democrats gain from Labour				
Liberal Democrats gain from Labour				

=== South Hanningfield, Stock & Margaretting ===
South Hanningfield, Stock & Margaretting
Party	Candidate	Votes	%
Conservative	Ian Grundy	1,051	76.7
Conservative	Roy Whitehead	977	71.3
Liberal Democrats	George Allen	190	13.9
Liberal Democrats	Nancy Edwards	181	13.2
Labour	Carol Stevens	140	10.2
Turnout		1,370	32.3
Conservative win (new seat)			
Conservative win (new seat)			

=== South Woodham - Chetwood & Collingwood ===
South Woodham - Chetwood & Collingwood
Party	Candidate	Votes	%	±%
Conservative	Maureen Moulds	855	65.6	+7.5
Conservative	James Allen	845	64.8	+8.9
Conservative	Christopher Stevenson	829	63.6	+7.8
Liberal Democrats	Matthew Lewis	297	22.8	+1.3
Liberal Democrats	Noel Sutcliffe	287	22.0	+4.8
Liberal Democrats	David Sykes	265	20.3	+4.2
Labour	Catherine Trevaldwyn	139	10.7	−11.6
Turnout		1,304	20.2	−0.2
Conservative hold				
Conservative hold				
Conservative hold				

=== South Woodham - Elmwood & Woodville ===
South Woodham - Elmwood & Woodville
Party	Candidate	Votes	%	±%
Conservative	Patricia Hughes	915	53.4	+22.4
Conservative	Robert Denston	914	53.4	+27.3
Conservative	Linda-Anne Denston	905	52.9	+28.7
Liberal Democrats	Jennifer Goldfinch	434	25.4	−10.0
Liberal Democrats	Ian Roberts	415	24.2	−11.9
Independent	Paul Martin	409	23.9	−13.5
Liberal Democrats	Judith Deakin	400	23.4	−10.9
Labour	James Barnett	218	12.7	−11.8
Labour	Alison Hurst	146	8.5	−16.5
Labour	Max Gibson	136	7.9	N/A
Turnout		1,712	27.4	+5.1
Conservative gain from Independent				
Conservative gain from Liberal Democrats				
Conservative gain from Liberal Democrats				

=== Springfield North ===
Springfield North
Party	Candidate	Votes	%	±%
Conservative	Graham McGhie	654	43.5	+12.7
Conservative	Anthony West	626	41.6	+12.4
Conservative	David Sismey	618	41.1	+16.4
Liberal Democrats	William Lane	613	40.8	−5.9
Liberal Democrats	Pamela Lane	612	40.7	−8.4
Liberal Democrats	Michael Mackrory	597	39.7	−1.7
Labour	Karen Kennedy	206	13.7	−4.6
Labour	Steven Haigh	192	12.8	−4.0
Labour	Margaret Horslen	187	12.4	−4.1
Turnout		1,504	21.8	−1.1
Conservative gain from Liberal Democrats				
Conservative gain from Liberal Democrats				
Conservative gain from Liberal Democrats				

=== Trinity ===
Trinity
Party	Candidate	Votes	%
Liberal Democrats	Ian Gale	748	54.9
Liberal Democrats	Susan Davis	739	54.3
Conservative	Paul Hutchinson	632	46.4
Conservative	Alastair Tween	569	41.8
Labour	Prudence Jones	175	12.8
Labour	Roderick Essery	165	12.1
Turnout		1,362	30.7
Liberal Democrats win (new seat)			
Liberal Democrats win (new seat)			

=== Waterhouse Farm ===
Waterhouse Farm
Party	Candidate	Votes	%	±%
Liberal Democrats	John Hunnable	609	45.4	−1.6
Liberal Democrats	Lorraine Cobbold	592	44.1	−0.7
Labour	Joan Bliss	431	32.1	−4.2
Labour	Maurice Austin	423	31.5	−4.8
Conservative	Anthony Lipman	363	27.1	+10.6
Conservative	Christopher Wickers	336	25.1	+9.4
Turnout		1,341	32.3	−6.7
Liberal Democrats hold				
Liberal Democrats hold				

=== Writtle ===
Writtle
Party	Candidate	Votes	%	±%
Conservative	Anthony Sach	692	40.0	+2.5
Conservative	Timothy Roper	690	39.9	+5.0
Liberal Democrats	Angela Robinson	661	38.2	+7.0
Liberal Democrats	Stephen Robinson	644	37.2	+10.9
Labour	Barry Grainger	191	11.0	−19.4
Independent	Thomas Mahon	171	9.9	N/A
Labour	Susan O'Brien	167	9.6	−17.5
Green	Richard De Ville	68	3.9	−1.9
Turnout		1,731	40.1	+1.6
Conservative hold				
Conservative hold				

== By-election ==
Little Baddow, Danbury and Sandon By-Election 11 November 2004
Party	Candidate	Votes	%	±%
Conservative	Robert Shepherd	940	57.7	−2.4
Liberal Democrats	David Whiteing	445	27.3	+9.9
UKIP	Jesse Pryke	94	5.8	+5.8
Green	Colin Budgey	91	5.6	−10.1
Labour	Joanna Grindrod	60	3.7	−3.1
Majority		495	30.4	
Turnout		1,630	25.4	
Conservative hold		Swing		

South Woodham, Ferrer Elmwood & Woodville By-Election 5 May 2005
Party	Candidate	Votes	%	±%
Conservative	Adrian Wilkins	1,987	53.4	+7.1
Liberal Democrats	Jenifer Goldfinch	938	25.3	+3.3
Independent	Ian Roberts	793	21.3	+0.6
Majority		1,049	28.1	
Turnout		3,718	60.2	
Conservative hold		Swing		

Trinity By-Election 5 May 2005
Party	Candidate	Votes	%	±%
Liberal Democrats	Martin Bracken	1,111	40.3	−7.8
Conservative	Paul Hutchinson	1,101	40.0	−0.6
Labour	Patrick Baldwin	542	19.7	+0.0
Majority		10	0.3	
Turnout		2,754	64.0	
Liberal Democrats hold		Swing		

The Lawns By-Election 15 September 2005
Party	Candidate	Votes	%	±%
Liberal Democrats	Robin Stevens	1,130	65.3	+20.0
Conservative	Pamela Joughin	540	31.2	−13.6
Labour	Alan Scott	40	2.3	−3.9
UKIP	Charles Cole	20	1.1	+1.1
Majority		590	34.1	
Turnout		1,730	40.4	
Liberal Democrats hold		Swing		

Bicknacre & East & West Hanningfield 23 February 2006
Party	Candidate	Votes	%	±%
Conservative	Michael Harris	736	77.0	+33.5
Liberal Democrats	David Whiteing	151	15.7	+3.9
Labour	John Knott	70	7.3	+1.4
Majority		585	61.3	
Turnout		957	23.7	
Conservative hold		Swing		
