= 1979 Chelmsford Borough Council election =

1979 English local election

- 3 May 1979

All 60 seats to Chelmsford Borough Council 31 seats needed for a majority

	First party	Second party
Party	Conservative	Liberal
Seats won	36	19
Seat change	▼10	▲10
Popular vote	73,066	56,845
Percentage	45.9%	35.7%
Swing	▼4.0%	▲11.0%
	Third party	Fourth party
Party	Labour	Independent
Seats won	3	2
Seat change	Steady	Steady
Popular vote	23,814	5,167
Percentage	15.0%	3.2%
Swing	▼7.5%	▲0.3%
- Winner of each seat at the 1979 Chelmsford Borough Council election.
Council control before election
Conservative
Council control after election
Conservative

The 1979 Chelmsford Borough Council election took place on 3 May 1979 to elect members of Chelmsford Borough Council in Essex, England. This was on the same day as the 1979 general election and other local elections.

== Summary ==
=== Election result ===
1979 Chelmsford Borough Council election
Party	Candidates	Seats	Gains	Losses	Net gain/loss	Seats %	Votes %	Votes	+/−
Conservative	60	36			▼10	60.0	45.9	73,066	–4.0
Liberal	45	19			▲10	31.7	35.7	56,845	+11.0
Labour	37	3			Steady	5.0	15.0	23,814	–7.5
Independent	6	2			Steady	3.3	3.2	5,167	+0.3
Communist	1	0			Steady	0.0	0.1	143	N/A
