= 1973 Chelmsford Borough Council election =

1973 English local election

- 10 May 1973

All 60 seats to Chelmsford Borough Council 31 seats needed for a majority

	First party	Second party
Party	Conservative	Labour
Seats won	30	16
Popular vote	53,160	58,176
Percentage	39.7%	43.5%
	Third party	Fourth party
Party	Liberal	Independent
Seats won	8	6
Popular vote	20,194	1,729
Percentage	15.1%	1.3%
Council control after election
No overall control

The 1973 Chelmsford Borough Council election took place on 10 May 1973 to elect members of Chelmsford Borough Council in Essex, England. This was on the same day as other local elections.

This was the inaugural election of the council following its creation by the Local Government Act 1972.

== Summary ==
=== Election result ===
1973 Chelmsford Borough Council election
Party	Candidates	Seats	Gains	Losses	Net gain/loss	Seats %	Votes %	Votes	+/−
Conservative	49	30	N/A	N/A	N/A	50.0	39.7	53,160	N/A
Labour	58	16	N/A	N/A	N/A	26.7	43.5	58,176	N/A
Liberal	14	8	N/A	N/A	N/A	13.3	15.1	20,194	N/A
Independent	8	6	N/A	N/A	N/A	10.0	1.3	1,729	N/A
Communist	2	0	N/A	N/A	N/A	0.0	0.4	583	N/A
