= 2007 Chelmsford Borough Council election =

Chelmsford City Council election

- 3 May 2007

All 57 seats to Chelmsford Borough Council 29 seats needed for a majority

	First party	Second party	Third party
Party	Conservative	Liberal Democrats	Labour
Last election	35	20	2
Seats before	35	20	2
Seats won	33	24	0
Seat change	▼2	▲4	▼2
Popular vote	57,909	35,966	10,299
Percentage	54.5%	33.9%	9.7%
Swing	▲6.4%	▼1.9%	▼3.5%

The 2007 Chelmsford Borough Council election took place on 3 May 2007 to elect members of Chelmsford Borough Council in England. This was on the same day as other local elections.

== Results summary ==
2007 Chelmsford Borough Council election
Party	Seats	Gains	Losses	Net gain/loss	Seats %	Votes %	Votes	+/−
Conservative	33	2	4	▼2	57.9	54.5	57,909	+6.4
Liberal Democrats	24	6	2	▲4	42.1	33.9	35,966	-1.9
Labour	0	0	2	▼2	0.0	9.7	10,299	-3.5
Green	0	0	0	Steady	0.0	1.0	1,045	+0.3
UKIP	0	0	0	Steady	0.0	0.5	547	N/A
Independent	0	0	0	Steady	0.0	0.4	415	-1.8

== Ward results ==
=== Bicknacre & East & West Hanningfield ===
Bicknacre & East & West Hanningfield
Party	Candidate	Votes	%	±%
Conservative	Michael Harris	1,222	75.3	+31.2
Conservative	Richard Poulter	1,212	74.7	+26.2
Liberal Democrats	Chris Abbott	168	10.4	−11.5
Liberal Democrats	Veronica Sadowsky	152	9.4	N/A
Labour	Tony Lees	150	9.2	−0.5
Labour	Joyce Lees	136	8.4	+1.6
Turnout		1,623	39.9	+3.1
Conservative hold				
Conservative hold				

=== Boreham & The Leighs ===
Boreham & The Leighs
Party	Candidate	Votes	%	±%
Conservative	John Galley	1,106	77.0	+7.5
Conservative	Philip Wilson	952	66.2	+12.8
Liberal Democrats	Roy Appleton	237	16.5	−8.1
Liberal Democrats	Clive Secluna	184	12.8	−6.2
Labour	Donald Newton	136	9.5	−3.0
Turnout		1,437	31.3	+1.3
Conservative hold				
Conservative hold				

=== Broomfield & The Walthams ===
Broomfield & The Walthams
Party	Candidate	Votes	%	±%
Conservative	Delmas Ashford	1,433	63.4	+3.6
Conservative	Alan Willsher	1,279	56.5	+2.6
Conservative	Brian Patient	1,214	53.7	+3.7
Liberal Democrats	Wendy Talley	469	20.7	−13.6
Liberal Democrats	Andrew Ball	440	19.5	−8.1
Liberal Democrats	Jeni Goldfinch	399	17.6	−9.5
Green	Richard Monk	256	11.3	N/A
Green	Reza Hossain	251	11.1	N/A
Green	Angela Thomson	248	11.0	N/A
UKIP	Charles Cole	216	9.5	N/A
Labour	Bill Evans	200	8.8	−0.8
Turnout		2,262	37.2	+3.2
Conservative hold				
Conservative hold				
Conservative hold				

=== Chelmer Village & Beaulieu Park ===
Chelmer Village & Beaulieu Park
Party	Candidate	Votes	%	±%
Conservative	Neil Gulliver	1,562	67.1	+6.5
Conservative	Ronald Alcock	1,560	67.0	+2.1
Conservative	Duncan Lumley	1,544	66.3	+0.6
Liberal Democrats	Stephen Asher	442	19.0	−4.2
Liberal Democrats	David Mackrory	437	18.8	−2.6
Liberal Democrats	Richard Pennicard	369	15.8	−3.6
Labour	Max Gibson	254	10.9	−3.8
Labour	Jeffrey Mushens	234	10.0	N/A
Labour	Mark Player	220	9.4	N/A
Turnout		2,329	29.0	+7.4
Conservative hold				
Conservative hold				
Conservative hold				

=== Chelmsford Rural West ===
Chelmsford Rural West
Party	Candidate	Votes	%	±%
Conservative	Nicolette Chambers	817	80.0	+22.5
Liberal Democrats	Angela Robinson	96	9.4	−26.3
Green	Colin Budgey	55	5.4	N/A
Labour	Roger Fellows	53	5.2	−1.6
Majority		721	70.6	+48.8
Turnout		1,021	45.7	−0.3
Conservative hold		Swing	▲24.4	

=== Galleywood ===
Galleywood
Party	Candidate	Votes	%	±%
Conservative	Janette Potter	989	60.6	−0.9
Conservative	David Stevenson	934	57.3	−2.3
Liberal Democrats	Andy Robson	421	25.8	+7.1
Liberal Democrats	Peter Kirk	382	23.4	+7.0
Labour	Robert Jones	207	12.7	−6.0
Labour	John Leslie	185	11.3	−7.2
Turnout		1,631	35.7	+5.6
Conservative hold				
Conservative hold				

=== Goat Hall ===
Goat Hall
Party	Candidate	Votes	%	±%
Liberal Democrats	Freda Mountain	904	53.5	−7.5
Liberal Democrats	John Williams	818	48.4	−5.9
Conservative	Robert Harman	696	41.2	+10.8
Conservative	Royston van Tromp	673	39.8	+10.3
Labour	Paul Matthews	99	5.9	−6.5
Labour	Angelica Medici	93	5.5	N/A
Turnout		1,690	37.6	+7.7
Liberal Democrats hold				
Liberal Democrats hold				

=== Great Baddow East ===
Great Baddow East
Party	Candidate	Votes	%	±%
Liberal Democrats	Chris Rycroft	1,182	45.3	−11.1
Liberal Democrats	Trevor Miller	1,173	44.9	−11.0
Liberal Democrats	Andrew Sosin	1,118	42.8	−12.1
Conservative	Gillian Smith	1,029	39.4	+6.6
Conservative	Keith Liley	1,026	39.3	+7.9
Conservative	John Scott	909	34.8	+4.1
UKIP	Jesse Pryke	331	12.7	N/A
Labour	John Devane	208	8.0	−1.6
Labour	Patricia Collins	190	7.3	−0.3
Labour	Stephanie Troop	151	5.8	−0.8
Turnout		2,610	39.9	+10.0
Liberal Democrats hold				
Liberal Democrats hold				
Liberal Democrats hold				

=== Great Baddow West ===
Great Baddow West
Party	Candidate	Votes	%	±%
Liberal Democrats	Margaret Hutchon	745	50.1	−7.3
Liberal Democrats	Jannetta Sosin	681	45.8	−8.8
Conservative	Jennifer Chandler	592	39.8	+9.5
Conservative	Chrissie Wilson	563	37.9	+7.9
Labour	Carol Evans	160	10.8	−0.9
Labour	Peter Dixon	139	9.3	−1.6
Turnout		1,487	34.3	+6.9
Liberal Democrats hold				
Liberal Democrats hold				

=== The Lawns ===
The Lawns
Party	Candidate	Votes	%	±%
Liberal Democrats	Robin Stevens	1,049	52.6	+5.9
Liberal Democrats	Ros Webb	959	48.1	+5.8
Conservative	Colin Penney	807	40.5	−5.7
Conservative	Jim Green	800	40.1	−5.4
Labour	Carol Stevens	130	6.5	+1.2
Labour	Bob Miller	126	6.3	−0.1
Turnout		1,993	45.7	+7.1
Liberal Democrats hold				
Liberal Democrats gain from Conservative				

=== Little Baddow, Danbury & Sandon ===
Little Baddow, Danbury & Sandon
Party	Candidate	Votes	%	±%
Conservative	Ian Wright	1,765	70.4	+1.9
Conservative	Robert Shepherd	1,763	70.3	+0.9
Conservative	Christopher Kingsley	1,746	69.6	+2.1
Liberal Democrats	David Whiteing	469	18.7	+5.8
Liberal Democrats	Lawrence O'Brien	376	15.0	−5.0
Liberal Democrats	Mary Bastick	328	13.1	+1.0
Labour	Steve Forte	180	7.2	−0.7
Labour	Sue Willis	179	7.1	N/A
Labour	Ian Ward	152	6.1	N/A
Turnout		2,507	37.9	+8.2
Conservative hold				
Conservative hold				
Conservative hold				

=== Marconi ===
Marconi
Party	Candidate	Votes	%	±%
Liberal Democrats	Jude Deakin	531	38.2	+25.1
Liberal Democrats	Graham Pooley	481	34.6	+21.6
Labour	Bill Horslen	464	33.4	−17.5
Labour	Adrian Longden	424	30.5	−16.7
Conservative	David Ormerod	391	28.1	−2.7
Conservative	Peter Martin	382	27.5	−0.3
Turnout		1,389	28.1	+10.2
Liberal Democrats gain from Labour				
Liberal Democrats gain from Labour				

=== Moulsham & Central ===
Moulsham & Central
Party	Candidate	Votes	%	±%
Conservative	David Lee	1,167	42.2	+2.0
Conservative	Robert Pontin	1,141	41.3	+1.8
Conservative	Sameh Hindi	1,126	40.7	+3.2
Liberal Democrats	Peter Brooks	984	35.6	−0.4
Liberal Democrats	James Gardner	975	35.3	+0.7
Liberal Democrats	Don Bacon	926	33.5	+1.0
Labour	Paddy Baldwin	296	10.7	−9.5
Labour	Pru Jones	271	9.8	−9.5
Labour	Maria Fegan	256	9.3	−9.3
Turnout		2,765	37.0	+5.2
Conservative hold				
Conservative hold				
Conservative hold				

=== Moulsham Lodge ===
Moulsham Lodge
Party	Candidate	Votes	%	±%
Liberal Democrats	Philip Firth	985	59.8	−6.3
Liberal Democrats	David Jones	908	55.1	−5.8
Conservative	Rhona Wheeler	477	28.9	+3.5
Conservative	Jenny Alefounder	458	27.8	+3.2
Labour	Alan Rigg	158	9.6	−3.9
Labour	Akin Adebogye	147	8.9	−2.9
Turnout		1,648	38.1	+6.5
Liberal Democrats hold				
Liberal Democrats hold				

=== Patching Hall ===
Patching Hall
Party	Candidate	Votes	%	±%
Liberal Democrats	Tom Smith-Hughes	1,239	48.5	+4.5
Liberal Democrats	Alan Arnot	1,192	46.7	+5.6
Liberal Democrats	Ashley Final	1,058	41.4	+2.9
Conservative	Nicki Lee	943	36.9	+0.2
Conservative	Robert Radley	929	36.4	+1.5
Conservative	Alan Chambers	927	36.3	+1.8
Labour	Roy Chad	295	11.6	−7.2
Labour	Elaine Baldwin	273	10.7	−5.2
Labour	David Howell	259	10.1	−6.7
Green	Adam Living	235	9.2	+1.0
Turnout		2,553	36.5	+8.6
Liberal Democrats hold				
Liberal Democrats hold				
Liberal Democrats hold				

=== Rettendon & Runwell ===
Rettendon & Runwell
Party	Candidate	Votes	%	±%
Conservative	Ray Ride	1,324	84.8	+24.9
Conservative	Lance Millane	1,279	81.9	+15.8
Liberal Democrats	Ken Hay	152	9.7	−4.7
Labour	Colin Farquhar	138	8.8	N/A
Liberal Democrats	Ryan Wakeling	98	6.3	N/A
Turnout		1,561	39.3	+5.3
Conservative hold				
Conservative hold				

=== St. Andrew's ===
St. Andrew's
Party	Candidate	Votes	%	±%
Liberal Democrats	Simon Jones	1,173	49.3	+1.0
Liberal Democrats	Gloria Nichols	1,154	48.5	+2.5
Liberal Democrats	Tom Willis	1,075	45.2	+0.4
Conservative	Peter Cousins	737	31.0	+9.6
Conservative	Alistair Patient	693	29.1	+7.9
Conservative	Clive Hodges	688	28.9	+8.3
Labour	Joan Bliss	459	19.3	−11.8
Labour	Chris Fegan	427	17.9	−11.6
Labour	John Knott	420	17.7	−11.0
Turnout		2,379	35.0	+2.2
Liberal Democrats hold				
Liberal Democrats hold				
Liberal Democrats hold				

=== South Hanningfield, Stock & Margaretting ===
South Hanningfield, Stock & Margaretting
Party	Candidate	Votes	%	±%
Conservative	Ian Grundy	1,335	79.7	+3.0
Conservative	Roy Whitehead	1,257	75.1	+3.8
Liberal Democrats	Nancy Edwards	210	12.5	−0.7
Liberal Democrats	John Masek	155	9.3	−4.6
Labour	Rod Essery	133	7.9	−2.3
Turnout		1,674	37.9	+5.6
Conservative hold				
Conservative hold				

=== South Woodham - Chetwood & Collingwood ===
South Woodham - Chetwood & Collingwood
Party	Candidate	Votes	%	±%
Conservative	Bob Denston	1,141	69.8	+5.0
Conservative	Maureen Moulds	1,122	68.7	+3.1
Conservative	Christopher Stephenson	1,101	67.4	+3.8
Liberal Democrats	Paul Moore	329	20.1	−2.7
Liberal Democrats	Barry Passingham	306	18.7	−1.6
Liberal Democrats	Noel Sutcliffe	272	16.6	−5.4
Labour	Andy Dearman	138	8.4	−2.3
Labour	Alan Carpenter	134	8.2	N/A
Turnout		1,634	24.9	+4.7
Conservative hold				
Conservative hold				
Conservative hold				

=== South Woodham - Elmwood & Woodville ===
South Woodham - Elmwood & Woodville
Party	Candidate	Votes	%	±%
Conservative	Tricia Hughes	1,179	66.7	+13.3
Conservative	Matt Lewis	1,100	62.3	+8.9
Conservative	Adrian Wilkins	1,060	60.0	+7.1
Independent	Ian Roberts	415	23.5	N/A
Liberal Democrats	Colin Davies	234	13.2	−12.2
Liberal Democrats	David Sykes	195	11.0	−13.2
Labour	Clifford Vanner	185	10.5	−2.2
Labour	Margaret Vanner	171	9.7	+1.2
Labour	Keith Gannicot	140	7.9	±0.0
Liberal Democrats	Lester Wakeling	132	7.5	−15.9
Turnout		1,767	28.1	+0.7
Conservative hold				
Conservative hold				
Conservative hold				

=== Springfield North ===
Springfield North
Party	Candidate	Votes	%	±%
Liberal Democrats	Pam Lane	1,030	46.9	+6.2
Liberal Democrats	Mike Mackrory	1,017	46.3	+6.6
Liberal Democrats	Ian Fuller	991	45.1	+4.3
Conservative	Graham McGhie	944	43.0	−0.5
Conservative	Yvonne Spence	925	42.1	+0.5
Conservative	Amar Bajaj	872	39.7	−1.4
Labour	Karen Kennedy	172	7.8	−5.9
Labour	Hilary Chad	170	7.7	−5.1
Labour	Russell Kennedy	166	7.6	−4.8
Turnout		2,195	32.1	+10.3
Liberal Democrats gain from Conservative				
Liberal Democrats gain from Conservative				
Liberal Democrats gain from Conservative				

=== Trinity ===
Trinity
Party	Candidate	Votes	%	±%
Conservative	Julie Maybrick	837	47.9	+1.5
Conservative	Jean Murray	811	46.4	+4.6
Liberal Democrats	Martin Bracken	753	43.1	−11.2
Liberal Democrats	Ian Gale	743	42.5	−12.4
Labour	Jon Legg	150	8.6	−4.2
Labour	George Owers	139	8.0	−4.1
Turnout		1,748	39.2	+8.5
Conservative gain from Liberal Democrats				
Conservative gain from Liberal Democrats				

=== Waterhouse Farm ===
Waterhouse Farm
Party	Candidate	Votes	%	±%
Liberal Democrats	John Hunnable	728	42.3	−3.1
Liberal Democrats	Lorraine Cobbold	712	41.3	−2.8
Conservative	Alistair Crockford	708	41.1	+14.0
Conservative	James Morgan	687	39.9	+14.8
Labour	Neil Spurgeon	246	14.3	−17.4
Labour	Jim Webb	215	12.5	−19.0
Turnout		1,722	35.9	+3.6
Liberal Democrats hold				
Liberal Democrats hold				

=== Writtle ===
Writtle
Party	Candidate	Votes	%	±%
Conservative	Tim Roper	992	53.1	+13.2
Conservative	Tony Sach	983	52.7	+12.7
Liberal Democrats	Philip Evans	632	33.9	−4.3
Liberal Democrats	Jonathan Fuller	598	32.0	−5.2
Labour	Mark Champness	136	7.3	−3.7
Labour	Roger Patterson	135	7.2	−2.4
Turnout		1,867	42.9	+2.8
Conservative hold				
Conservative hold				

== By-elections ==
Broomfield and The Walthams By-Election 11 September 2007
Party	Candidate	Votes	%	±%
Liberal Democrats	Malcolm Taylor	1,198	56.3	+38.1
Conservative	Mike Steel	742	34.9	−20.8
Labour	Jim Webb	76	3.6	−4.2
UKIP	Charles Cole	57	2.7	−5.7
Green	Reza Hossain	53	2.5	−7.4
Majority		456	21.4	
Turnout		2,126	35.0	
Liberal Democrats gain from Conservative		Swing		

Moulsham and Central By-Election 14 December 2007
Party	Candidate	Votes	%	±%
Liberal Democrats	James Gardner	1,051	55.0	+14.6
Conservative	James Morgan	640	33.5	−14.6
Labour	John Knott	153	8.0	−3.5
UKIP	Jesse Pryke	67	3.5	+3.5
Majority		411	21.5	
Turnout		1,911	26.1	
Liberal Democrats gain from Conservative		Swing		
