= 1999 Chelmsford Borough Council election =

1999 UK local government election

- 6 May 1999

All 56 seats to Chelmsford Borough Council 29 seats needed for a majority

	First party	Second party
Party	Liberal Democrats	Conservative
Seats won	28	21
Seat change	▼4	▲8
Popular vote	30,458	29,880
Percentage	37.9%	37.2%
Swing	▼3.0%	▲8.7%
	Third party	Fourth party
Party	Labour	Independent
Seats won	5	2
Seat change	▼2	▼2
Popular vote	17,408	1,490
Percentage	21.7%	1.9%
Swing	▼4.9%	▼1.6%
- Winner of each seat at the 1999 Chelmsford Borough Council election.
Council control before election
Liberal Democrats
Council control after election
No overall control

The 1999 Chelmsford Borough Council election took place on 6 May 1999 to elect members of Chelmsford Borough Council in England. This was on the same day as other local elections.

== Results summary ==
1999 Chelmsford Borough Council election
Party	Candidates	Seats	Gains	Losses	Net gain/loss	Seats %	Votes %	Votes	+/−
Liberal Democrats	55	28	2	6	▼4	50.0	37.9%	30,458	–3.0
Conservative	56	21	8	0	▲8	37.5	37.2	29,880	+8.7
Labour	51	5	0	2	▼2	8.9	21.7	17,408	–4.9
Independent	6	2	0	2	▼2	3.6	1.9	1,490	–1.6
Green	10	0	0	0	Steady	0.0	1.2	929	+0.7
Ind. Conservative	1	0	0	0	Steady	0.0	0.2	198	N/A

== Ward results ==
=== All Saints ===
All Saints
Party	Candidate	Votes	%	±%
Labour	W. Horslen	558	55.9	−7.0
Labour	A. Longden	525	52.6	−6.8
Conservative	J. Candler	226	22.6	+8.1
Liberal Democrats	P. Aiken	220	22.0	+2.7
Conservative	C. Wickers	200	20.0	+6.0
Liberal Democrats	J. Nicholson	192	19.2	+1.5
Turnout		998	22.6	−17.5
Labour hold				
Labour hold				

=== Baddow Road & Great Baddow Village ===
Baddow Road & Great Baddow Village
Party	Candidate	Votes	%	±%
Liberal Democrats	C. Davies	1,026	48.6	−6.0
Liberal Democrats	C. Rycroft	943	44.6	−5.2
Liberal Democrats	T. Miller	939	44.5	−4.0
Conservative	M. Holoway	587	27.8	+4.4
Conservative	M. Knowles	582	27.6	+5.2
Conservative	G. Smith	561	26.6	+5.6
Labour	R. Burgess	334	15.8	−5.8
Labour	J. McClean	330	15.6	−5.2
Labour	M. Palmer	311	14.7	−5.4
Independent	J. Pryke	267	12.6	N/A
Green	J. Shiner	81	3.8	N/A
Turnout		2,112	35.5	−8.1
Liberal Democrats hold				
Liberal Democrats hold				
Liberal Democrats hold				

=== Boreham ===
Boreham
Party	Candidate	Votes	%	±%
Liberal Democrats	M. Dilloway	452	58.2	−7.2
Conservative	A. Leslie	187	24.1	+9.1
Labour	L. Hay	90	11.6	−5.4
Green	E. Burgess	48	6.2	+3.7
Majority		265	34.1	−14.5
Turnout		782	28.8	−11.9
Liberal Democrats hold		Swing	▼8.2	

=== Broomfield Pleshey & Great Waltham ===
Broomfield Pleshey & Great Waltham
Party	Candidate	Votes	%	±%
Conservative	D. Ashford	969	54.9	+3.3
Liberal Democrats	G. Pooley	665	37.7	+2.7
Conservative	J. Need	650	36.8	+6.3
Liberal Democrats	A. Goldsmith	487	27.6	N/A
Labour	R. Patterson	258	14.6	−9.3
Ind. Conservative	C. Cole	198	11.2	−19.3
Turnout		1,765	34.3	−4.8
Conservative gain from Independent				
Liberal Democrats hold				

=== Cathedral ===
Cathedral
Party	Candidate	Votes	%	±%
Conservative	P. Hutchinson	591	42.4	+11.2
Liberal Democrats	M. Bracken	579	41.5	−6.1
Conservative	A. Tween	547	39.2	+9.8
Liberal Democrats	A. Sosin	496	35.6	−11.7
Labour	F. Bache	319	22.9	+3.2
Labour	S. Barke	309	22.2	+2.8
Turnout		1,394	31.3	−16.1
Conservative gain from Liberal Democrats				
Liberal Democrats hold				

=== Chignall Good Easter, Highwoodmashbury & Roxwell ===
Chignall Good Easter, Highwoodmashbury & Roxwell
Party	Candidate	Votes	%	±%
Liberal Democrats	P. Evans	360	49.7	−1.2
Conservative	D. Pyman	269	37.1	+5.6
Labour	B. Williams	96	13.2	−4.4
Majority		91	12.6	−6.7
Turnout		730	38.3	−10.1
Liberal Democrats hold		Swing	▼3.4	

=== East & West Hanningfield ===
East & West Hanningfield
Party	Candidate	Votes	%	±%
Independent	A. Dixon	376	51.0	−19.0
Conservative	R. Saunders	257	34.9	N/A
Labour	K. Blackburn	104	14.1	−15.9
Majority		119	16.1	−23.9
Turnout		738	41.2	−1.6
Independent hold		Swing	▼27.0	

=== Galleywood ===
Galleywood
Party	Candidate	Votes	%	±%
Conservative	J. Potter	709	44.8	+9.4
Conservative	D. Stevenson	664	41.9	+6.8
Labour	P. Smith	479	30.3	−2.8
Labour	A. Wilson	475	30.0	−1.4
Liberal Democrats	J. Clarke	393	24.8	−5.2
Liberal Democrats	J. Hutchon	297	18.8	−3.7
Turnout		1,583	34.2	−7.0
Conservative hold				
Conservative hold				

=== Goat Hall ===
Goat Hall
Party	Candidate	Votes	%	±%
Liberal Democrats	F. Mountain	869	61.4	+4.6
Liberal Democrats	J. Williams	788	55.7	−10.0
Conservative	H. Robinson	342	24.2	+1.9
Conservative	E. Lumley	342	24.2	+2.3
Labour	F. Parish	206	14.6	−2.5
Labour	C. Trevaldwyn	176	12.4	−2.0
Turnout		1,415	31.7	−9.4
Liberal Democrats hold				
Liberal Democrats hold				

=== Great & Little Leighs & Little Waltham ===
Great & Little Leighs & Little Waltham
Party	Candidate	Votes	%	±%
Conservative	A. Willsher	570	68.5	+12.8
Liberal Democrats	E. Smith	135	16.2	−0.9
Labour	M. Horslen	127	15.3	−11.9
Majority		435	52.3	+23.8
Turnout		840	37.3	−6.0
Conservative hold		Swing	▲6.9	

=== Little Baddow Danbury & Sandon ===
Little Baddow Danbury & Sandon
Party	Candidate	Votes	%	±%
Conservative	M. Hurrell	1,243	58.1	+15.2
Conservative	C. Kingsley	1,224	57.2	+13.5
Conservative	I. Wright	1,216	56.8	+15.1
Liberal Democrats	D. Whiteing	519	24.2	−2.4
Liberal Democrats	L. O'Brien	463	21.6	−5.9
Liberal Democrats	S. Harvey	404	18.9	−8.9
Labour	N. Jackson	222	10.4	−0.2
Labour	W. Jardine	205	9.6	−1.3
Green	C. Budgey	159	7.4	−1.1
Green	R. Aylott	143	6.7	N/A
Green	R. Kenney	75	3.5	N/A
Turnout		2,141	33.0	−11.3
Conservative hold				
Conservative hold				
Conservative hold				

=== Margaretting & Stock ===
Margaretting & Stock
Party	Candidate	Votes	%	±%
Conservative	G. Stringer	612	71.1	+12.0
Labour	R. Jones	125	14.5	−2.0
Liberal Democrats	H. Lambert	124	14.4	−10.0
Majority		487	56.6	+22.0
Turnout		867	36.9	−9.7
Conservative hold		Swing	▲7.0	

=== Moulsham Lodge ===
Moulsham Lodge
Party	Candidate	Votes	%	±%
Liberal Democrats	P. Firth	902	64.7	+4.6
Liberal Democrats	D. Jones	819	58.8	−3.7
Conservative	D. Cruickshank	283	20.3	+2.0
Conservative	R. Paddon	255	18.3	+0.9
Labour	C. Dyer	216	15.5	−5.8
Labour	P. Goodwin	174	12.5	−8.3
Green	J. Barnes	56	4.0	N/A
Turnout		1,394	35.5	−9.1
Liberal Democrats hold				
Liberal Democrats hold				

=== Old Moulsham ===
Old Moulsham
Party	Candidate	Votes	%	±%
Liberal Democrats	M. Foreman	749	44.8	+6.7
Liberal Democrats	W. Hale	720	43.0	+4.0
Liberal Democrats	K. Francis	705	42.1	+3.9
Conservative	P. Marchand	501	29.9	+0.5
Conservative	V. Makin	499	29.8	+2.5
Conservative	D. Kimberlin	488	29.2	+4.0
Labour	M. Briault	407	24.3	−2.7
Labour	A. Rigg	385	23.0	−2.9
Labour	G. Viney	341	20.4	−3.8
Turnout		1,673	27.3	−17.2
Liberal Democrats hold				
Liberal Democrats hold				
Liberal Democrats hold				

=== Patching Hall ===
Patching Hall
Party	Candidate	Votes	%	±%
Liberal Democrats	T. Smith-Hughes	740	44.0	−4.8
Liberal Democrats	C. Barrett	699	41.5	−6.3
Liberal Democrats	A. Johnson	670	39.8	−7.3
Conservative	K. Pauley	639	38.0	+14.1
Conservative	M. McCullough	507	30.1	+6.7
Conservative	I. Day	487	28.9	+7.2
Labour	J. Bliss	382	22.7	−1.7
Labour	R. Essery	355	21.1	−2.2
Labour	P. Bennett	342	20.3	−1.0
Green	A. Thompson	102	6.1	N/A
Turnout		1,683	28.7	−13.9
Liberal Democrats hold				
Liberal Democrats hold				
Liberal Democrats hold				

=== Rettendon & Runwell ===
Rettendon & Runwell
Party	Candidate	Votes	%	±%
Conservative	J. Little	535	53.0	N/A
Conservative	E. Mickleborough	498	49.4	+8.6
Labour	D. Newton	224	22.2	−6.9
Liberal Democrats	J. Meyn	170	16.8	−3.6
Liberal Democrats	D. Owen	128	12.7	N/A
Independent	A. Brown	124	12.3	N/A
Turnout		1,009	25.0	−11.0
Conservative gain from Independent				
Conservative hold				

=== Rothmans ===
Rothmans
Party	Candidate	Votes	%	±%
Liberal Democrats	M. Hutchon	572	50.7	+3.3
Liberal Democrats	M. Lambert	532	47.1	+0.1
Conservative	K. Carr	323	28.6	+5.6
Conservative	P. Martin	307	27.2	+7.5
Labour	C. Kemp	258	22.9	−5.0
Labour	L. Feeney	254	22.5	−4.8
Green	E. Deakin	52	4.6	N/A
Turnout		1,129	25.8	−13.8
Liberal Democrats hold				
Liberal Democrats hold				

=== South Hanningfield ===
South Hanningfield
Party	Candidate	Votes	%	±%
Conservative	R. Whitehead	410	70.1	+10.4
Liberal Democrats	A. Arnot	175	29.9	+16.8
Majority		235	40.2	+7.6
Turnout		609	32.9	−6.9
Conservative hold		Swing	▼3.2	

=== South Woodham - Chetwood & Collingwood ===
South Woodham - Chetwood & Collingwood
Party	Candidate	Votes	%	±%
Conservative	M. Moulds	726	58.1	+13.7
Conservative	J. Allen	699	55.9	+4.2
Conservative	C. Stephenson	698	55.8	+11.6
Labour	R. Smith	279	22.3	−5.6
Labour	P. Wedlock	271	21.7	−3.5
Liberal Democrats	J. Deakin	269	21.5	−6.0
Labour	A. Dearman	248	19.8	−4.8
Liberal Democrats	N. Sutcliffe	215	17.2	−9.4
Liberal Democrats	D. Sykes	201	16.1	−8.0
Turnout		1,250	20.4	−7.7
Conservative hold				
Conservative hold				
Conservative hold				

=== South Woodham - Elmwood & Woodville ===
South Woodham - Elmwood & Woodville
Party	Candidate	Votes	%	±%
Independent	P. Martin	511	37.4	+2.7
Liberal Democrats	I. Roberts	493	36.1	+2.1
Liberal Democrats	J. Goldfinch	483	35.4	+2.8
Liberal Democrats	R. Elson	469	34.3	+3.4
Conservative	D. Sismey	423	31.0	+2.3
Conservative	K. Darby	356	26.1	+0.1
Labour	C. Vanner	341	25.0	−1.7
Labour	J. Barnett	335	24.5	+3.7
Conservative	C. Knight	330	24.2	+0.8
Turnout		1,366	22.3	
Independent hold				
Liberal Democrats hold				
Liberal Democrats hold				

=== Springfield North ===
Springfield North
Party	Candidate	Votes	%	±%
Liberal Democrats	P. Lane	751	49.1	−6.6
Liberal Democrats	W. Lane	714	46.7	−13.4
Liberal Democrats	M. Mackrory	632	41.4	−13.1
Conservative	G. Fawcett	471	30.8	−2.4
Conservative	P. Hepworth	446	29.2	−0.9
Conservative	S. Poyser	378	24.7	−5.4
Labour	P. Cobb	280	18.3	−7.7
Labour	D. Beddoe	256	16.8	−9.1
Labour	M. Pearson	252	16.5	−7.8
Independent	R. Parker	105	6.9	+3.5
Turnout		1,528	22.9	−9.5
Liberal Democrats hold				
Liberal Democrats hold				
Liberal Democrats hold				

=== Springfield South ===
Springfield South
Party	Candidate	Votes	%	±%
Conservative	R. Alcock	775	49.2	+21.4
Conservative	D. Lumley	752	47.7	+17.3
Conservative	N. Gulliver	720	45.7	+18.6
Liberal Democrats	R. Webb	535	34.0	−10.9
Liberal Democrats	R. Webb	514	32.6	−12.3
Liberal Democrats	J. Styles	512	32.5	−11.2
Labour	K. Pallett	219	13.9	−6.6
Labour	A. Hurst	204	13.0	−6.4
Labour	E. Raynham	175	11.1	−7.1
Independent	J. Berry	107	6.8	N/A
Turnout		1,575	29.4	
Conservative gain from Liberal Democrats				
Conservative gain from Liberal Democrats				
Conservative gain from Liberal Democrats				

=== St. Andrew's ===
St. Andrew's
Party	Candidate	Votes	%	±%
Labour	E. Baldwin	1,071	46.4	+7.4
Labour	J. Devane	1,017	44.0	+7.6
Labour	R. Kennedy	1,007	43.6	+1.6
Liberal Democrats	K. Hay	649	28.1	−3.9
Liberal Democrats	I. Gale	638	27.6	−5.8
Liberal Democrats	M. Noble	603	26.1	−5.5
Conservative	S. Cruickshank	529	22.9	+4.4
Conservative	A. Lewis	525	22.7	+4.8
Conservative	L. Saich	501	21.7	+4.4
Green	C. Coker	112	4.9	N/A
Turnout		2,309	34.3	−19.0
Labour hold				
Labour hold				
Labour hold				

=== The Lawns ===
The Lawns
Party	Candidate	Votes	%	±%
Liberal Democrats	P. Harvey	1,048	57.8	+3.0
Liberal Democrats	A. Hall	974	53.8	+4.6
Conservative	D. Hepworth	518	28.6	−6.0
Conservative	D. Lee	503	27.8	−2.8
Labour	W. Jordan	243	13.4	+0.5
Labour	W. Evans	227	12.5	+1.2
Turnout		1,812	38.4	−15.0
Liberal Democrats hold				
Liberal Democrats hold				

=== Waterhouse Farm ===
Waterhouse Farm
Party	Candidate	Votes	%	±%
Liberal Democrats	J. Hunnable	852	47.0	+8.3
Liberal Democrats	J. Thackray	812	44.8	+6.5
Labour	M. Austin	658	36.3	−3.1
Labour	D. Howell	658	36.3	−2.6
Conservative	C. Hodges	295	16.3	−0.6
Conservative	N. Stevenson	284	15.7	−1.0
Turnout		1,814	39.0	−11.1
Liberal Democrats gain from Labour				
Liberal Democrats gain from Labour				

=== Woodham Ferrers & Bicknacre ===
Woodham Ferrers & Bicknacre
Party	Candidate	Votes	%	±%
Conservative	D. Selway	417	61.3	+15.4
Liberal Democrats	M. Staines	165	24.3	−10.4
Labour	R. Brady	98	14.4	−5.0
Majority		252	37.1	+25.9
Turnout		701	29.8	−7.4
Conservative hold		Swing	▲12.9	

=== Writtle ===
Writtle
Party	Candidate	Votes	%	±%
Conservative	A. Sach	650	37.5	+8.5
Conservative	E. Barribal	604	34.9	+8.0
Liberal Democrats	G. Reeves	541	31.2	−4.2
Labour	B. Grainger	526	30.4	−1.3
Labour	S. O'Sullivan	469	27.1	−4.4
Liberal Democrats	T. Willis	456	26.3	−6.0
Green	P. Gaywood	101	5.8	N/A
Turnout		1,733	38.5	−8.4
Conservative gain from Liberal Democrats				
Conservative gain from Liberal Democrats				

== By-elections ==
Old Moulsham By-Election 16 September 1999
Party	Candidate	Votes	%	±%
Conservative		529	34.4	+3.6
Labour		494	32.1	+7.1
Liberal Democrats		476	30.9	−13.3
Green		41	2.7	+2.7
Majority		35	2.3	
Turnout		1,540	25.1	
Conservative gain from Liberal Democrats		Swing		

Boreham By-Election 6 July 2000
Party	Candidate	Votes	%	±%
Conservative		637	56.6	+32.5
Liberal Democrats		315	28.0	−30.2
Labour		78	6.9	−4.7
New Britain		50	4.4	+4.4
Green		46	4.1	−2.1
Majority		322	28.6	
Turnout		1,126	42.5	
Conservative gain from Liberal Democrats		Swing		

Woodham Ferrers and Bicknacre By-Election 2 May 2002
Party	Candidate	Votes	%	±%
Conservative		546	52.0	−9.3
Liberal Democrats		438	41.7	+17.4
Labour		67	6.4	+0.0
Majority		108	10.3	
Turnout		1,051	45.5	
Conservative hold		Swing		
