= 1991 Chelmsford Borough Council election =

1991 UK local government election

- 2 May 1991

All 56 seats to Chelmsford Borough Council 29 seats needed for a majority

| | First party | Second party |
|---|---|---|
| Party | Conservative | Liberal Democrats |
| Seats won | 28 | 21 |
| Seat change | ▲2 | ▼5 |
| Popular vote | 49,506 | 43,797 |
| Percentage | 42.5% | 37.6% |
| Swing | ▼1.8% | ▼7.3% |
| | Third party | Fourth party |
| Party | Independent | Labour |
| Seats won | 5 | 2 |
| Seat change | ▲1 | ▲2 |
| Popular vote | 5,586 | 17,309 |
| Percentage | 4.8% | 14.9% |
| Swing | ▲3.1% | ▲5.8% |
- Winner of each seat at the 1991 Chelmsford Borough Council election.
Council control before election
Liberal Democrats
Council control after election
No overall control

The 1991 Chelmsford Borough Council election took place on 2 May 1991 to elect members of Chelmsford Borough Council in England. This was on the same day as other local elections.

== Summary ==
=== Election result ===
1991 Chelmsford Borough Council election
| Party | Candidates | Seats | Gains | Losses | Net gain/loss | Seats % | Votes % | Votes | +/− |
|---|---|---|---|---|---|---|---|---|---|
| Conservative | 53 | 28 | 3 | 1 | ▲2 | 50.0 | 42.5 | 49,506 | –1.8 |
| Liberal Democrats | 50 | 21 | 0 | 5 | ▼5 | 37.5 | 37.6 | 43,797 | –7.3 |
| Independent | 11 | 5 | 1 | 0 | ▲1 | 8.9 | 4.8 | 5,586 | +3.1 |
| Labour | 49 | 2 | 2 | 0 | ▲2 | 3.6 | 14.9 | 17,309 | +5.8 |
| Green | 2 | 0 | 0 | 0 | Steady | 0.0 | 0.2 | 260 | N/A |

== Ward results ==
=== All Saints ===
All Saints
| Party | Candidate | Votes | % | ±% |
|---|---|---|---|---|
| Labour | W. Horslen | 818 | 44.2 | |
| Labour | A. Londgen | 765 | 41.4 | |
| Liberal Democrats | K. Hay | 553 | 29.9 | |
| Liberal Democrats | L. Foster | 553 | 29.9 | |
| Conservative | K. Carr | 390 | 21.1 | |
| Conservative | C. Hodges | 384 | 20.8 | |
| Turnout | | 1,850 | 46.5 | |
| Labour gain from Liberal Democrats | | | | |
| Labour gain from Liberal Democrats | | | | |

=== Baddow Road & Great Baddow Village ===
Baddow Road & Great Baddow Village
| Party | Candidate | Votes | % | ±% |
|---|---|---|---|---|
| Liberal Democrats | M. Gill | 1,694 | 52.3 | |
| Liberal Democrats | C. Davies | 1,652 | 51.0 | |
| Liberal Democrats | C. Rackham | 1,499 | 46.3 | |
| Conservative | J. Chandler | 1,157 | 35.7 | |
| Conservative | M. Knowles | 1,127 | 34.8 | |
| Conservative | R. Turner | 1,115 | 34.4 | |
| Labour | O. Ephraim | 346 | 10.7 | |
| Labour | D. Shinn | 331 | 10.2 | |
| Labour | C. Kemp | 330 | 10.2 | |
| Turnout | | 3,237 | 53.1 | |
| Liberal Democrats hold | | | | |
| Liberal Democrats hold | | | | |
| Liberal Democrats hold | | | | |

=== Boreham ===
Boreham
| Party | Candidate | Votes | % | ±% |
|---|---|---|---|---|
| Liberal Democrats | M. Dilloway | 731 | 59.5 | |
| Conservative | W. Thorne | 305 | 24.8 | |
| Green | E. Burgess | 102 | 8.3 | |
| Labour | R. Bass | 91 | 7.4 | |
| Majority | | 426 | 34.7 | |
| Turnout | | 1,229 | 50.8 | |
| Liberal Democrats hold | | Swing | | |

=== Broomfield Pleshey & Great Waltham ===
Broomfield Pleshey & Great Waltham
| Party | Candidate | Votes | % | ±% |
|---|---|---|---|---|
| Independent | D. Ashford | 1,051 | 44.2 | |
| Conservative | C. Cole | 890 | 37.4 | |
| Conservative | D. Johnson | 711 | 29.9 | |
| Liberal Democrats | T. Goldsmith | 556 | 23.4 | |
| Liberal Democrats | B. Talley | 487 | 20.5 | |
| Labour | F. Saltmarsh | 360 | 15.1 | |
| Labour | H. Thompson | 245 | 10.3 | |
| Turnout | | 2,380 | 48.4 | |
| Independent hold | | | | |
| Conservative hold | | | | |

=== Cathedral ===
Cathedral
| Party | Candidate | Votes | % | ±% |
|---|---|---|---|---|
| Conservative | J. Candler | 882 | 42.3 | |
| Conservative | J. Melville | 835 | 40.0 | |
| Liberal Democrats | D. Edgson-Smith | 832 | 39.9 | |
| Liberal Democrats | A. Hall | 824 | 39.5 | |
| Labour | W. Evans | 285 | 13.7 | |
| Labour | E. Cawston | 277 | 13.3 | |
| Independent | A. Begent | 43 | 2.1 | |
| Turnout | | 2,086 | 49.4 | |
| Conservative gain from Liberal Democrats | | | | |
| Conservative gain from Liberal Democrats | | | | |

=== Chignall Good Easter, Highwoodmashbury & Roxwell ===
Chignall Good Easter, Highwoodmashbury & Roxwell
| Party | Candidate | Votes | % | ±% |
|---|---|---|---|---|
| Conservative | T. Matthews | 530 | 44.9 | |
| Liberal Democrats | P. Evans | 427 | 36.2 | |
| Labour | D. Welton | 224 | 19.0 | |
| Majority | | 103 | 8.7 | |
| Turnout | | 1,181 | 60.8 | |
| Conservative hold | | Swing | | |

=== East & West Hanningfield ===
East & West Hanningfield
| Party | Candidate | Votes | % | ±% |
|---|---|---|---|---|
| Independent | A. Dixon | 496 | 51.2 | |
| Conservative | S. Poyser | 322 | 33.3 | |
| Labour | N. Spurgeon | 150 | 15.5 | |
| Majority | | 174 | 18.0 | |
| Turnout | | 968 | 54.9 | |
| Independent hold | | Swing | | |

=== Galleywood ===
Galleywood
| Party | Candidate | Votes | % | ±% |
|---|---|---|---|---|
| Conservative | J. Potter | 892 | 46.1 | |
| Conservative | R. Thorne | 886 | 45.8 | |
| Liberal Democrats | K. Francis | 641 | 33.1 | |
| Independent | J. Wyatt | 442 | 22.9 | |
| Labour | J. Grant | 368 | 19.0 | |
| Labour | J. McGreevy | 308 | 15.9 | |
| Turnout | | 1,934 | 42.5 | |
| Conservative hold | | | | |
| Conservative hold | | | | |

=== Goat Hall ===
Goat Hall
| Party | Candidate | Votes | % | ±% |
|---|---|---|---|---|
| Liberal Democrats | F. Mountain | 1,080 | 46.2 | |
| Liberal Democrats | G. Allen | 1,024 | 43.8 | |
| Conservative | J. Spence | 1,013 | 43.3 | |
| Conservative | D. Lesford | 991 | 42.4 | |
| Labour | S. O'Brien | 212 | 9.1 | |
| Labour | I. Yarham | 189 | 8.1 | |
| Turnout | | 2,338 | 52.9 | |
| Liberal Democrats hold | | | | |
| Liberal Democrats hold | | | | |

=== Great & Little Leighs & Little Waltham ===
Great & Little Leighs & Little Waltham
| Party | Candidate | Votes | % | ±% |
|---|---|---|---|---|
| Conservative | A. Wilsher | 744 | 68.6 | |
| Liberal Democrats | E. Smith | 205 | 18.9 | |
| Labour | J. Bliss | 135 | 12.5 | |
| Majority | | 539 | 49.7 | |
| Turnout | | 1,084 | 49.8 | |
| Conservative hold | | Swing | | |

=== Little Baddow Danbury & Sandon ===
Little Baddow Danbury & Sandon
| Party | Candidate | Votes | % | ±% |
|---|---|---|---|---|
| Conservative | G. Dyson | 1,753 | 54.1 | |
| Conservative | C. Kingsley | 1,739 | 53.7 | |
| Independent | J. Bacon | 1,378 | 42.6 | |
| Independent | B. Leyton | 1,111 | 34.3 | |
| Liberal Democrats | M. Staines | 723 | 22.3 | |
| Liberal Democrats | D. Whiteing | 700 | 21.6 | |
| Liberal Democrats | L. O'Brien | 681 | 21.0 | |
| Labour | T. Harris | 181 | 5.6 | |
| Labour | W. Jardine | 173 | 5.3 | |
| Labour | K. Nunn | 150 | 4.6 | |
| Turnout | | 3,238 | 51.6 | |
| Conservative hold | | | | |
| Conservative hold | | | | |
| Independent gain from Conservative | | | | |

=== Margaretting & Stock ===
Margaretting & Stock
| Party | Candidate | Votes | % | ±% |
|---|---|---|---|---|
| Conservative | E. Weaver | 853 | 72.1 | |
| Liberal Democrats | V. Davies | 167 | 14.1 | |
| Labour | M. Soul-Gray | 163 | 13.8 | |
| Majority | | 686 | 58.0 | |
| Turnout | | 1,183 | 49.8 | |
| Conservative hold | | Swing | | |

=== Moulsham Lodge ===
Moulsham Lodge
| Party | Candidate | Votes | % | ±% |
|---|---|---|---|---|
| Liberal Democrats | P. Firth | 1,190 | 57.4 | |
| Liberal Democrats | D. Jones | 1,026 | 49.5 | |
| Conservative | S. Flack | 582 | 28.1 | |
| Conservative | I. Perera | 559 | 27.0 | |
| Labour | D. Edler | 284 | 13.7 | |
| Labour | R. Patterson | 234 | 11.3 | |
| Turnout | | 2,074 | 49.8 | |
| Liberal Democrats hold | | | | |
| Liberal Democrats hold | | | | |

=== Old Moulsham ===
Old Moulsham
| Party | Candidate | Votes | % | ±% |
|---|---|---|---|---|
| Conservative | C. Cave | 1,324 | 48.4 | |
| Conservative | Y. Miller | 1,188 | 43.5 | |
| Conservative | D. Stevenson | 1,113 | 40.7 | |
| Liberal Democrats | J. Davis | 976 | 35.7 | |
| Liberal Democrats | W. Hale | 955 | 34.9 | |
| Liberal Democrats | V. Sadowsky | 887 | 32.4 | |
| Labour | E. Baldwin | 414 | 15.1 | |
| Labour | Y. Cleary | 405 | 14.8 | |
| Labour | A. Scammell | 375 | 13.7 | |
| Turnout | | 2,734 | 50.0 | |
| Conservative hold | | | | |
| Conservative hold | | | | |
| Conservative hold | | | | |

=== Patching Hall ===
Patching Hall
| Party | Candidate | Votes | % | ±% |
|---|---|---|---|---|
| Liberal Democrats | F. Sturt | 1,254 | 43.1 | |
| Liberal Democrats | R. Monk | 1,216 | 41.8 | |
| Liberal Democrats | S. Linger | 1,154 | 39.6 | |
| Conservative | B. Cooper | 1,131 | 38.9 | |
| Conservative | S. Gillingham | 1,093 | 37.5 | |
| Conservative | J. Lewis | 1,083 | 37.2 | |
| Labour | D. Roberts | 400 | 13.7 | |
| Labour | J. Devane | 351 | 12.1 | |
| Labour | A. Final | 343 | 11.8 | |
| Green | A. Thomson | 158 | 5.4 | |
| Turnout | | 2,911 | 51.4 | |
| Liberal Democrats hold | | | | |
| Liberal Democrats hold | | | | |
| Liberal Democrats hold | | | | |

=== Rettendon & Runwell ===
Rettendon & Runwell
| Party | Candidate | Votes | % |
|---|---|---|---|
| Conservative | S. Denford | Unopposed | |
| Independent | E. Roberts | Unopposed | |
| Turnout | | N/A | N/A |
| Conservative hold | | | |
| Independent hold | | | |

=== Rothmans ===
Rothmans
| Party | Candidate | Votes | % | ±% |
|---|---|---|---|---|
| Liberal Democrats | F. Page | 916 | 47.2 | |
| Liberal Democrats | M. Hutchon | 915 | 47.2 | |
| Conservative | S. Bowden | 719 | 37.1 | |
| Conservative | N. Poonian | 712 | 36.7 | |
| Labour | A. Green | 256 | 13.2 | |
| Labour | J. McLean | 250 | 12.9 | |
| Turnout | | 1,940 | 43.7 | |
| Liberal Democrats hold | | | | |
| Liberal Democrats hold | | | | |

=== South Hanningfield ===
South Hanningfield
| Party | Candidate | Votes | % |
|---|---|---|---|
| Independent | J. Norton | Unopposed | |
| Turnout | | N/A | N/A |
| Independent hold | | | |

=== South Woodham - Chetwood & Collingwood ===
South Woodham - Chetwood & Collingwood
| Party | Candidate | Votes | % | ±% |
|---|---|---|---|---|
| Conservative | G. Leigh | 1,412 | 64.8 | |
| Conservative | C. Stephenson | 1,379 | 63.3 | |
| Conservative | E. Mickelborough | 1,364 | 62.6 | |
| Liberal Democrats | M. Kemp | 610 | 28.0 | |
| Liberal Democrats | M. Lamb | 600 | 27.5 | |
| Liberal Democrats | D. Sykes | 556 | 25.5 | |
| Turnout | | 2,179 | 41.3 | |
| Conservative hold | | | | |
| Conservative hold | | | | |
| Conservative hold | | | | |

=== South Woodham - Elmwood & Woodville ===
South Woodham - Elmwood & Woodville
| Party | Candidate | Votes | % | ±% |
|---|---|---|---|---|
| Conservative | L. Denston | 1,143 | 47.9 | |
| Conservative | J. Theobald | 1,012 | 42.4 | |
| Conservative | B. Pead | 903 | 37.8 | |
| Independent | P. Martin | 764 | 32.0 | |
| Liberal Democrats | A. James | 672 | 28.2 | |
| Liberal Democrats | O. Cox | 662 | 27.7 | |
| Liberal Democrats | F. Waterworth | 499 | 20.9 | |
| Labour | E. Johnson | 287 | 12.0 | |
| Labour | D. Perkins | 271 | 11.4 | |
| Labour | K. Singer | 255 | 10.7 | |
| Turnout | | 2,386 | 39.5 | |
| Conservative gain from Liberal Democrats | | | | |
| Conservative gain from Liberal Democrats | | | | |
| Conservative gain from Liberal Democrats | | | | |

=== Springfield North ===
Springfield North
| Party | Candidate | Votes | % | ±% |
|---|---|---|---|---|
| Conservative | D. Hepworth | 1,212 | 42.9 | |
| Liberal Democrats | W. Davey | 1,204 | 42.6 | |
| Liberal Democrats | W. Lane | 1,163 | 41.1 | |
| Conservative | S. Reynolds | 1,158 | 40.9 | |
| Conservative | C. Wickers | 1,151 | 40.7 | |
| Liberal Democrats | M. Mackrory | 1,048 | 37.1 | |
| Labour | S. Haigh | 364 | 12.9 | |
| Labour | C. Hicks | 352 | 12.4 | |
| Labour | A. Rook | 305 | 10.8 | |
| Turnout | | 2,828 | 45.5 | |
| Conservative gain from Liberal Democrats | | | | |
| Liberal Democrats hold | | | | |
| Liberal Democrats hold | | | | |

=== Springfield South ===
Springfield South
| Party | Candidate | Votes | % | ±% |
|---|---|---|---|---|
| Conservative | D. Lumley | 908 | 53.2 | |
| Conservative | F. Vella | 806 | 47.2 | |
| Conservative | M. Hurley | 788 | 46.2 | |
| Liberal Democrats | H. Wayne | 632 | 37.0 | |
| Liberal Democrats | R. Webb | 607 | 35.6 | |
| Independent | J. Styles | 301 | 17.6 | |
| Labour | C. Dyer | 208 | 12.2 | |
| Labour | R. Butler | 173 | 10.1 | |
| Labour | S. Shaw | 159 | 9.3 | |
| Turnout | | 1,706 | 41.5 | |
| Conservative hold | | | | |
| Conservative hold | | | | |
| Conservative hold | | | | |

=== St. Andrew's ===
St. Andrew's
| Party | Candidate | Votes | % | ±% |
|---|---|---|---|---|
| Liberal Democrats | M. Young | 1,525 | 42.3 | |
| Liberal Democrats | P. Storey | 1,455 | 40.3 | |
| Liberal Democrats | M. Frewin | 1,447 | 40.1 | |
| Labour | R. Chad | 1,069 | 29.6 | |
| Labour | P. Bennett | 998 | 27.7 | |
| Labour | C. Butler | 960 | 26.6 | |
| Conservative | H. Hanmer | 922 | 25.6 | |
| Conservative | A. Lewis | 902 | 25.0 | |
| Conservative | C. Patient | 872 | 24.2 | |
| Turnout | | 3,606 | 53.3 | |
| Liberal Democrats hold | | | | |
| Liberal Democrats hold | | | | |
| Liberal Democrats hold | | | | |

=== The Lawns ===
The Lawns
| Party | Candidate | Votes | % | ±% |
|---|---|---|---|---|
| Liberal Democrats | P. Harvey | 1,348 | 47.1 | |
| Conservative | R. Alcock | 1,308 | 45.7 | |
| Liberal Democrats | J. Stuart | 1,234 | 43.1 | |
| Conservative | A. Gunn | 1,175 | 41.0 | |
| Labour | W. Jordan | 220 | 7.7 | |
| Labour | A. Coburn | 217 | 7.6 | |
| Turnout | | 2,865 | 58.5 | |
| Liberal Democrats hold | | | | |
| Conservative hold | | | | |

=== Waterhouse Farm ===
Waterhouse Farm
| Party | Candidate | Votes | % | ±% |
|---|---|---|---|---|
| Liberal Democrats | J. Hunnable | 967 | 40.5 | |
| Liberal Democrats | J. Thackray | 958 | 40.1 | |
| Conservative | V. Makin | 664 | 27.8 | |
| Labour | S. Emmerson | 651 | 27.2 | |
| Conservative | R. Paddon | 650 | 27.2 | |
| Labour | G. Shearwood | 621 | 26.0 | |
| Turnout | | 2,390 | 50.2 | |
| Liberal Democrats hold | | | | |
| Liberal Democrats hold | | | | |

=== Woodham Ferrers & Bicknacre ===
Woodham Ferrers & Bicknacre
| Party | Candidate | Votes | % | ±% |
|---|---|---|---|---|
| Conservative | K. Wendon | 622 | 65.2 | |
| Liberal Democrats | S. Harvey | 332 | 34.8 | |
| Majority | | 290 | 30.4 | |
| Turnout | | 954 | 42.3 | |
| Conservative hold | | Swing | | |

=== Writtle ===
Writtle
| Party | Candidate | Votes | % | ±% |
|---|---|---|---|---|
| Conservative | H. Riddiford | 1,080 | 52.1 | |
| Conservative | D. Pyman | 1,052 | 50.8 | |
| Liberal Democrats | M. Sinclair | 427 | 20.6 | |
| Labour | B. Grainger | 397 | 19.2 | |
| Labour | P. Metcalfe | 389 | 18.8 | |
| Liberal Democrats | S. Nash | 333 | 16.1 | |
| Independent | N. Sargent | 179 | 8.6 | |
| Turnout | | 2,072 | 48.8 | |
| Conservative hold | | | | |
| Conservative hold | | | | |

== By-elections ==
=== Writtle ===
Writtle by-election: 8 December 1994
| Party | Candidate | Votes | % | ±% |
|---|---|---|---|---|
| Liberal Democrats | | 704 | 39.9 | +19.4 |
| Labour | | 588 | 33.3 | +14.2 |
| Conservative | | 472 | 26.8 | –25.0 |
| Majority | | 116 | 6.6 | N/A |
| Turnout | | 1,764 | 39.7 | –9.1 |
| Registered electors | | 4,443 | | |
| Liberal Democrats gain from Conservative | | Swing | ▲2.6 | |
