= Mardyke (river) =

River in Essex, England

Mardyke Mar Dyke
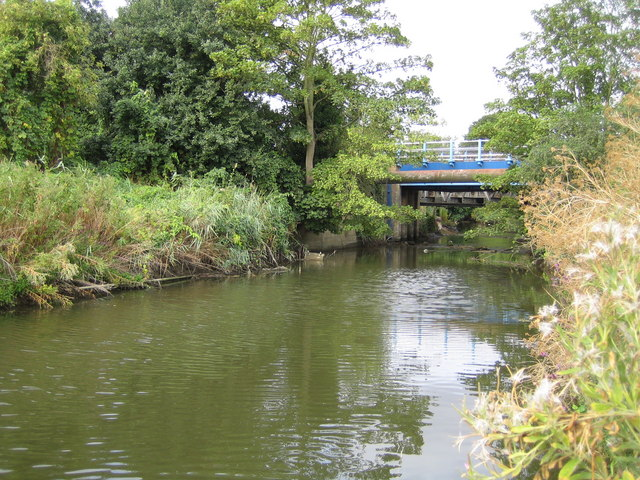
- The Mardyke near Purfleet

Location
- Country: England
- Counties: Essex
- Towns: Thurrock

Physical characteristics
- Source: Holden's Wood
  - location: Between Great Warley and Little Warley
  - coordinates: 51°35′52.13″N 0°17′36.3″E
- Mouth: River Thames
  - location: Purfleet
  - coordinates: 51°29′9.29″N 0°13′41.14″E
- Length: 18 km (11 mi)
- Basin size: 90.7 km^{2} (35.0 sq mi)
- Discharge
  - location: Stifford
  - average: 0.48 m^{3}/s (17 cu ft/s)

The Mardyke (sometimes, but less frequently, Mar Dyke, occasionally Mardike) is a small river, mainly in Thurrock, that flows into the River Thames at Purfleet, close to the Queen Elizabeth II Bridge. In part, it forms the boundary between the Essex hundreds of Barstable and Chafford. The river gives its name to the Mardyke Valley—a project aimed at increasing appreciation and usage of recreational land around the Mardyke.

== Location, source and tributaries ==
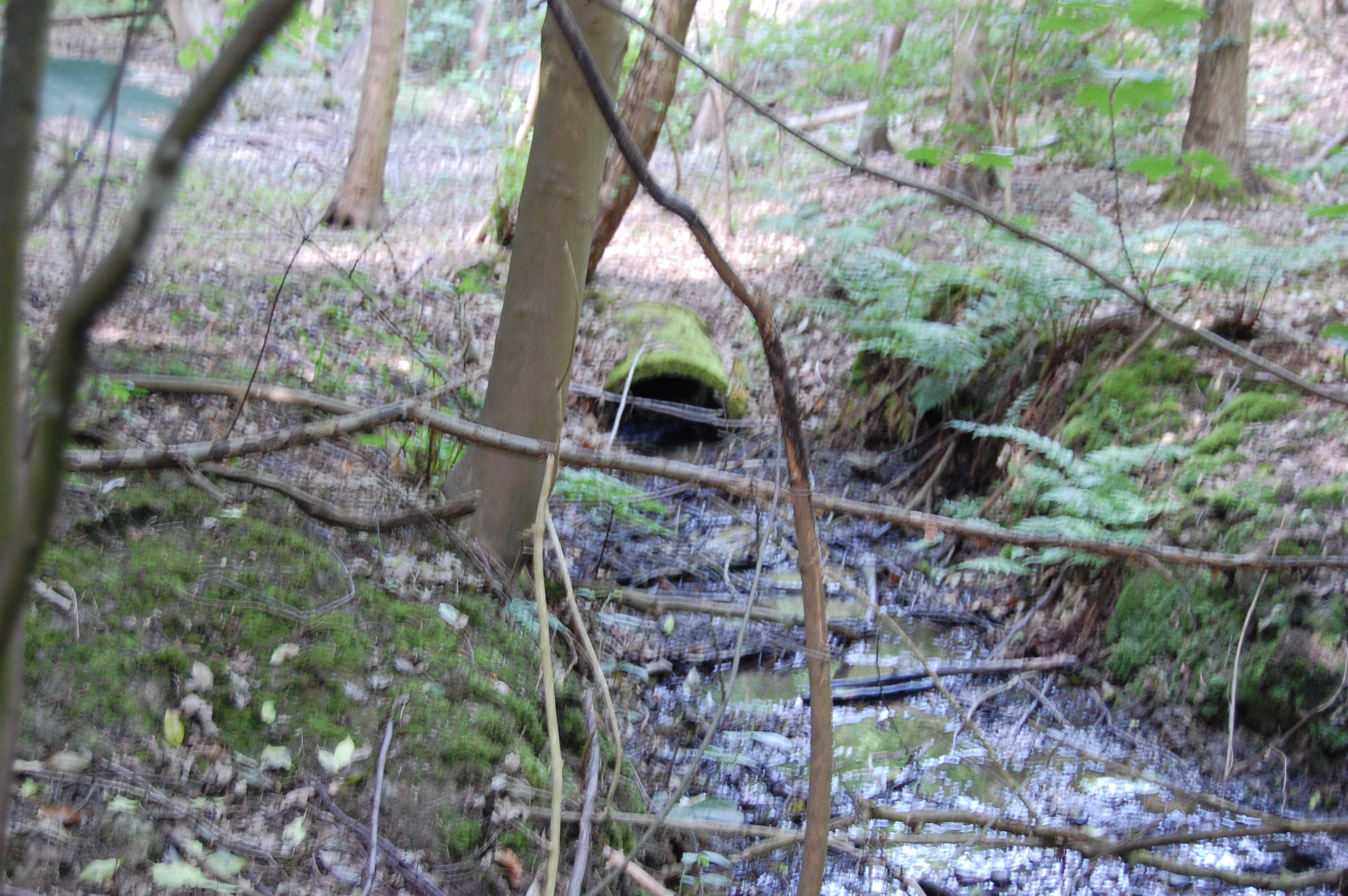
The main source of the Mardyke in Holden's Wood

The main source of the Mardyke is in Holden's Wood between Great Warley and Little Warley. It flows roughly 11 miles (18 km) from the source to the Tideway of the Thames at Purfleet, close to the Queen Elizabeth II Bridge. There are two tributaries flowing south from Thorndon Country Park, in the grounds of Thorndon Hall. One of these flows south from Old Hall Pond. The pond has a sluice gate that could be opened to allow the water to flow over an artificial waterfall – the sort of water feature popular with landscape gardeners such as Lancelot "Capability" Brown who landscaped the grounds of Thorndon Hall in the 18th century, although the pond itself dates from the 13th century. Another tributary flows west from Dunton Plotlands section of the Langdon Nature Reserve in Langdon Hills and another flows east from Upminster.

== Name ==
The name means "boundary ditch". It is mentioned in an Anglo-Saxon charter dated 1062 (S 1036) as part of the boundary for Upminster, although this charter is probably a post-conquest forgery. It has also been called "the Flete" (flete is derived from flēot, an Old English word for "small estuary") and more simply "the brook". One of the Mardyke's tributaries flows from Childerditch. This name appears as "celta" in a 7th-century charter (S 1246). Celta may be the pre-Saxon name for the ditch which flows into the Mardyke and may also be an early name for the Mardyke itself. For most of its course, the river acts as a parish boundary and in part, the river forms the boundary between the Essex hundreds of Barstable and Chafford.

== History ==
Between Stifford and the Rainham marshes where the Mardyke enters the Thames, the river flows through a relatively steep sided valley formed by an earlier position of the Thames. There is ancient woodland on the valley slopes and the land close to the river was used for grazing. Pollen evidence from the Mardyke valley shows that there was woodland regeneration at the end of the Roman period and into the early Anglo-Saxon period.

There is a substantial bridge over the Mardyke at Stifford. A medieval stone bridge was built in 1487, although this has subsequently been replaced more than once. Various archaeological objects have been found in the Mardyke close to Stifford Bridge. These include a hammerstone, a small sword and a Pilgrim badge.

There was a water mill on the Mardyke at Purfleet in the 14th century, that was owned by the Knights Templar. From about 1760, sluice gates protected the lowlying land through which the Mardyke flows from the tidal and saline Thames.

The Mardyke was an important communication corridor connecting the River Thames to the inland fen landscape to the northeast. In the 19th century and earlier, the Mardyke was navigable to Bulphan. Using a network of drainage ditches, manure from London was brought to local farms and agricultural produce taken to market. In the 18th century, when the river was still tidal, it may have been navigable as far as Orsett Hall at high tide.

During the First World War, a PoW camp was sited close to where the Mardyke enters the Thames.

== Recreation and wildlife ==
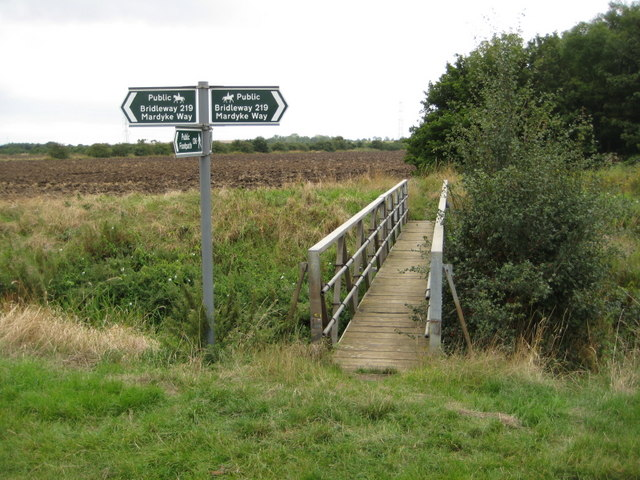
Part of the Mardyke Way at Bulphan

The river gives its name to the Mardyke Valley—a project aimed at increasing the appreciation and usage of recreational land around the Mardyke—which is a part of the Thames Chase Community Forest. The project includes a seven-mile riverside walk known as the Mardyke Way, running from Ship Lane, Aveley to Orsett Fen. In 2005, the project received a grant of over £600,000 from the Heritage Lottery Fund (HLF). The Mardyke Way passes through Davy Down, a 32 acres (13 ha) riverside park between Lakeside Shopping Centre and South Ockendon that was opened in 1993. The park includes the Victorian Stifford viaduct and the pumping station which is open to the public on Thursday afternoons and at other times when the warden is present. The flow of the Mardyke is very sluggish at this point, allowing the growth of bur reed and common reed. The river itself has been designated a wildlife corridor, allowing flora and fauna to move from one site to another.

To the north of the Mardyke Way close to Stifford, the river also gives its name to Mardyke Woods, although these are actually a combination of three ancient woods—Brannet's Wood, Millard's Wood and Low Well Wood.

To the north of the river at Stifford is the Mardyke Valley Golf Club, an 18-hole course set in the grounds of Ford Place and opened in 2002.

In 2010, Andrew Mackinlay MP opened a new bridge over the Mardyke at Purfleet. This bridge – named the Veolia Mardyke Bridge – links Purfleet to the Rainham Marshes Nature Reserve.

== See also ==
- Tributaries of the River Thames
- List of rivers of England

Next confluence upstream	River Thames	Next confluence downstream
River Ingrebourne (north)	Mardyke	River Darent (south)
