= North Ockendon =

Settlement in Greater London, England

Coordinates: 51.54815°N 0.29924°E

- Village
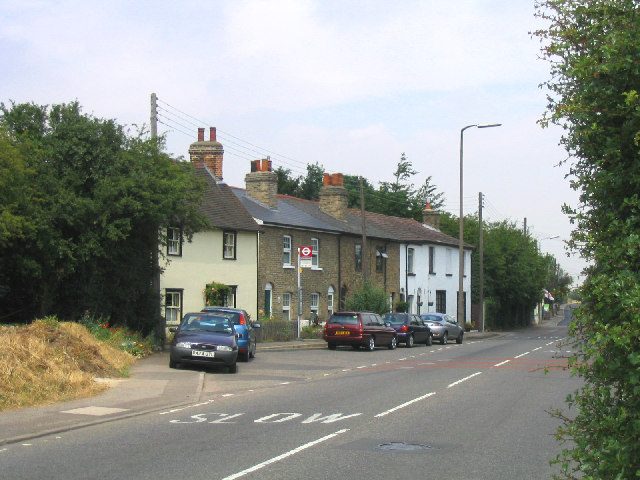
- North Ockendon village

- Location within Greater London
- OS grid reference: TQ595855
  - Charing Cross: 18 mi (29 km) WSW
- London borough: Havering
- Ceremonial county: Greater London
- Region: London
- Country: England
- Sovereign state: United Kingdom
- Post town: UPMINSTER
- Postcode district: RM14
- Dialling code: 01708
- Police: Metropolitan
- Fire: London
- Ambulance: London
- UK Parliament: Hornchurch and Upminster
- London Assembly: Havering and Redbridge

North Ockendon is the easternmost settlement of Greater London, England, and part of the London Borough of Havering. It is 18 miles (29 km) east-northeast of Central London and consists of a dispersed settlement within the Metropolitan Green Belt. It was historically an ancient parish in the county of Essex, which was abolished for civil purposes in 1936. At the 1931 census (the last before the abolition of the parish), North Ockendon had a population of 291. North Ockendon is the only inhabited area in Greater London outside the M25 London Orbital Motorway. North Ockendon is north of South Ockendon, in Thurrock, Essex.

== History ==
North Ockendon (parish) population
1881	329
1891	351
1901	340
1911	309
1921	326
1931	291
source: UK census

The ancient parish of North Ockendon had an elongated east–west shape, thus contrasting with a series of perpendicular parishes to its north and west. With the adjoining parishes this formed a large estate that is at least middle-Saxon or, perhaps, even Roman or Bronze Age. The parish church, dedicated to Mary Magdalene, was built in the fourteenth century, on the site of an earlier church.

From 1894, North Ockendon formed a parish in the Orsett Rural District of Essex. In 1931 the county council proposed that the parish should transfer to Purfleet Urban District as part of a review of districts triggered by the Local Government Act 1929. The proposals met with objections and by 1933 it was decided to divide the parish between an expanded Hornchurch Urban District and a new Thurrock Urban District. Purfleet Urban District Council took legal action in an attempt to revert to the earlier scheme, ultimately taking the case to the House of Lords without success. In 1936 the majority of its former area was used to enlarge the Cranham parish of Hornchurch Urban District. The remainder, around 383 acres (1.55 km^{2}), became part of Thurrock Urban District. North Ockendon was still rural at the time of its inclusion in the Hornchurch Urban District, but it was anticipated suburban house building would soon encroach on the parish. The creation of the Metropolitan Green Belt meant the limit of London's urban sprawl stopped just short of the parish boundary, and North Ockendon remained rural.

In 1965, Hornchurch Urban District was abolished, and its former area, including North Ockendon, was transferred to Greater London and used to form the present-day London Borough of Havering. North Ockendon and Great Warley were to the east of the M25 motorway when it was constructed. In 1992, it was proposed that the part of Greater London to the east of the M25 should be transferred to Essex, with the Great Warley section north of the railway transferred to Brentwood and the North Ockendon section to the south transferred to Thurrock. The transfer of North Ockendon from London to Essex was strongly opposed, with Nicholas Bonsor MP stating that his constituents agreed it had "more affinity with Havering than with Thurrock". Following the review the Great Warley section was transferred to Essex, but the North Ockendon part was not, leaving it the only part of Greater London to be outside the M25 motorway.

North Ockendon is the location of Stubbers, a former stately home which was demolished in 1955, the grounds of which are now used as an activity centre.

== Notable residents ==
Elizabeth Kucinich, wife of the U.S. congressman and presidential candidate Dennis Kucinich, was born in North Ockendon in 1977.

== Demography ==
North Ockendon lies within the Upminster ward of the borough of Havering. The 2011 census showed that the population was 96% white (92% British, 2% Other, 2% Irish). Indian, Chinese and Black African were 1% each.

== Geography ==
To the east is a small area of fenland, which extends into Bulphan and the rest is clays and Thames alluvials. The land is very low-lying. The field boundaries are wholly rectilinear. In the far north, beyond the London, Tilbury and Southend line, it borders the villages of Great Warley, Little Warley and Childerditch in the borough of Brentwood. The settlements of West Horndon and Bulphan are to the east, and South Ockendon, to the south, is in the borough and unitary authority of Thurrock. It is the only significant settlement in Greater London which lies outside the M25 motorway.

The Church of St Mary Magdalene, North Ockendon has a probably re-used Norman nave door on the south side of the nave. Its tower was used in the first accurate measurement of the speed of sound, by the Reverend William Derham, Rector of Upminster. Gunshots were fired from the tower and the flash thereof was observed by telescope from the tower of the church of St Laurence, Upminster; then the time was recorded until the sound arrived, from which, with an accurate distance measurement, the speed could be calculated.

== Economy ==
=== Proposed data centre ===
North Ockendon is the proposed location of the 175-hectare London Data Freeport data centre. As of October 2023, Havering Council was considering granting permission through a local development order.

== Transport ==
The nearest railway stations are at Ockendon and Upminster. London bus route 370 directly links the area with Upminster and Romford, as well as Lakeside Shopping Centre. Essex commercial route 269 operated by NIBSbuses directly links the area with Brentwood, specifically the town centre as well as Becket Keys Church of England School on the two schoolday journeys it operates Monday to Friday, and Warley, Great Warley, Ockendon, Stifford and Grays, although this service only operates five times a day Monday to Friday and four times on a Saturday with special fares that are not part of the TfL fare system.

Ensignbus routes X21, X31 and X81 used to serve North Ockendon on their way to Brentwood, Lakeside Shopping Centre, Shenfield and Ongar. However, these services were all withdrawn in favour of a new service called the X90 operating between Brentwood and Lakeside Shopping Centre on February 18, 2019. However, route X90 did not last long as the service was withdrawn on June 15, 2019, due to an unviable amount of passengers as at the time the Elizabeth line was not fully open, with the intended replacement being the already existing commercial 269 service.

The least frequent regular bus route in London which was route 347 served North Ockendon from November 6, 2004, to January 18, 2025, linking the area with Romford, Harold Wood, Upminster, Cranham, Gallows Corner and Ockendon. The route was withdrawn due to being "one of the least used bus routes" in all of Greater London excluding mobility routes and school services.
