= West Horndon =

Village in Essex, England

Coordinates: 51.57°N 0.34°E

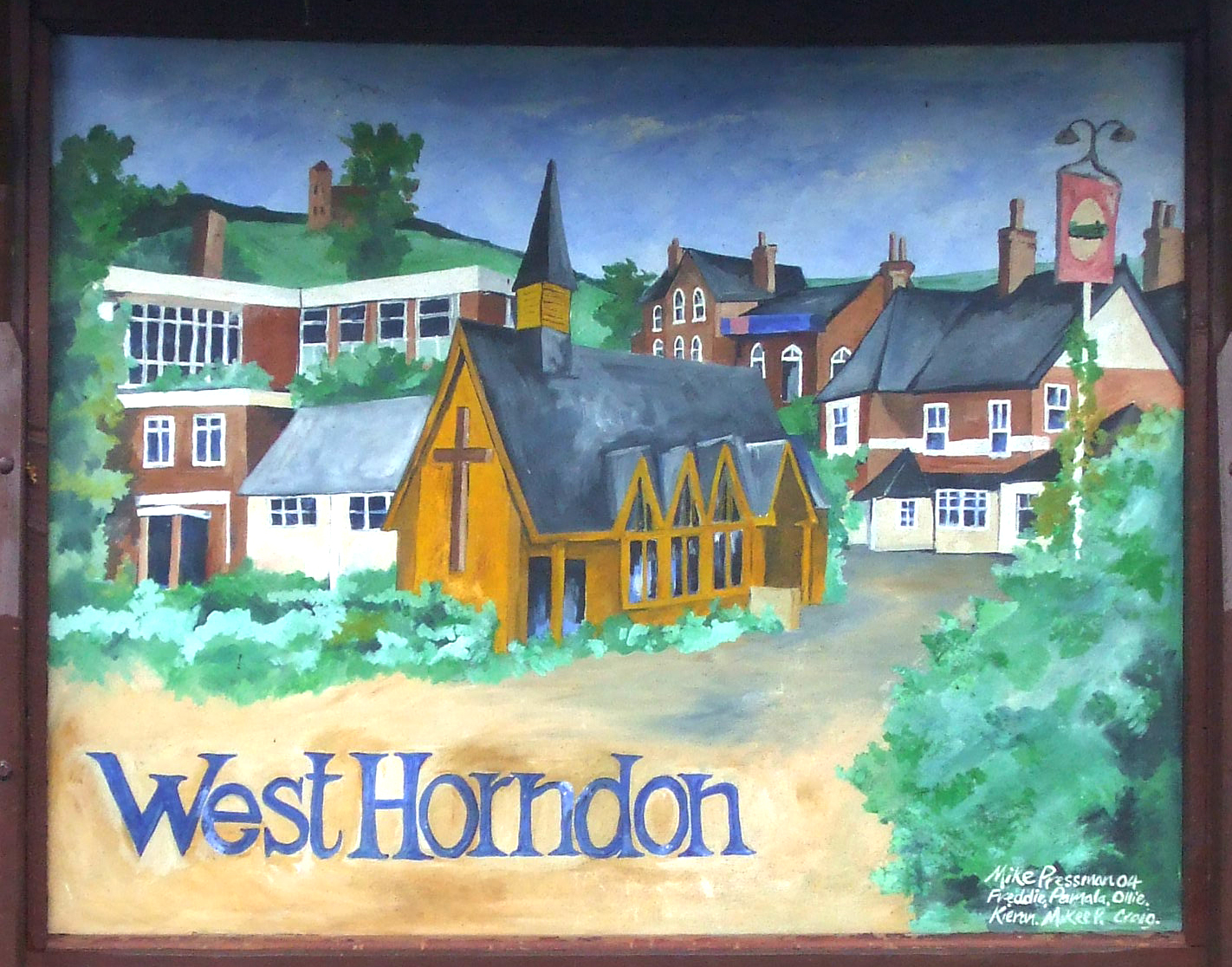
- Village sign

- Location within Essex
- Interactive map of West Horndon
- Area: 7.652 km^{2} (2.954 sq mi)
- Population: 1,649 (Parish, 2021)
  - Density: 215/km^{2} (560/sq mi)
- OS grid reference: TQ622880
  - London: 20 mi (32 km) WSW
- Civil parish: West Horndon
- District: Brentwood
- Shire county: Essex
- Region: East
- Country: England
- Sovereign state: United Kingdom
- Post town: BRENTWOOD
- Postcode district: CM13
- Dialling code: 01277
- Police: Essex
- Fire: Essex
- Ambulance: East of England
- UK Parliament: Brentwood and Ongar

West Horndon is a village and civil parish in the south of the Borough of Brentwood in Essex, England. It is located 20 miles (32 km) east-northeast of Charing Cross in Central London. As well as West Horndon village, the parish also includes East Horndon, the southern part of Little Warley, and surrounding rural areas. At the 2021 census the parish had a population of 1,649.

Dunton Hills, at the eastern end of the civil parish, is planned to be the location of a new 3,700 home garden village. A 2,100 home new town development at Tillingham Hall on the southern border of the parish is also planned.

== History ==
The name Horndon is Old English, and comes from horn or thorn meaning hawthorn, and dun meaning hill.

In the Domesday Book of 1086 there were three estates or manors listed at the vill of Torninduna or Torinduna in the Barstable Hundred of Essex. The area became the two parishes of East Horndon and West Horndon, with the parish of West Horndon corresponding to the manor of Thorndon Hall, and the parish of East Horndon covering the two manors of Heron (to the north) and Abbotts (to the south).

West Horndon's medieval parish church, dedicated to St Nicholas, stood adjoining Old Thorndon Hall, which had been a moated manor house in medieval times before being rebuilt in the 1570s as an Elizabethan mansion.

In 1712 the parishes of West Horndon and Ingrave were united for ecclesiastical purposes. Following the construction of a new church at Ingrave to serve the combined parish, the old church of St Nicholas at West Horndon was demolished in 1734. In the 1760s, a new Thorndon Hall was built 1.2 miles (1.9 km) north of the old hall, at the northern tip of the parish. Only slight ruins of the old hall now remain. Although abolished as an ecclesiastical parish in 1712, West Horndon continued to exist as a civil parish for the purposes of administering the poor laws.

The London, Tilbury and Southend railway built its new shorter inland route to Southend in the 1880s, to relieve congestion on the original main line to the south. East Horndon railway station opened on the new route in 1886. Although in the civil parish of West Horndon, the station was named after nearby East Horndon, which was then the larger settlement. There was no village of West Horndon as such at that time, with the civil parish of West Horndon being very sparsely populated. Much of the parish was the parkland of Thorndon Hall, and the southern part of the parish where the station was built was open farmland. A new village of West Horndon subsequently grew up around the station, and the station was renamed West Horndon in 1949.

Further growth of the village was encouraged with the establishment of Rotary Hoes in 1938, a manufacturer of trenching machinery. House-building continued in the 1950s for commuters to London as well as for workers at Rotary Hoes. In 1975 Rotary Hoes left West Horndon.

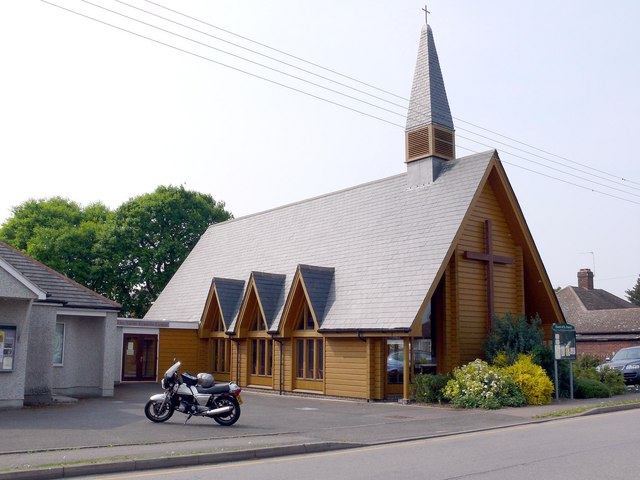
St Francis' Church

The ecclesiastical parishes in the area were reorganised in 1961. West Horndon was separated from Ingrave and merged instead with East Horndon. All Saints' Church at East Horndon was declared redundant in 1970 and is now looked after by the Churches Conservation Trust. The modern church of St Francis at West Horndon now serves as the Anglican parish church for the ecclesiastical parish of East and West Horndon.

== Governance ==
There are three tiers of local government covering West Horndon, at parish, district, and county level: West Horndon Parish Council, Brentwood Borough Council, and Essex County Council. The parish council generally meets at St Francis' Church.

West Horndon was an ancient parish in the Barstable Hundred of Essex. When elected parish and district councils were established in 1894 it was included in the Billericay Rural District. West Horndon's population at that time was too low to be given a parish council, and so it had a parish meeting instead. In 1934 a County Review Order abolished the rural district and the civil parish of West Horndon. The part of West Horndon parish north of the railway, including the village itself, was added to the urban district of Brentwood. The part of West Horndon parish south of the railway was temporarily added to the new Billericay Urban District; four years later in 1938 that area south of the railway was transferred instead to Thurrock Urban District.

West Horndon village has been administered as part of Brentwood since 1934. The area became unparished when the urban district was enlarged to become the modern Brentwood district in 1974. A new civil parish called West Horndon was created in 2003 from part of the unparished area, providing an additional tier of local government for that area. The new parish created in 2003 has very different boundaries to the old parish abolished in 1934. Notably, it excludes the site of the original settlement of West Horndon where Old Thorndon Hall and St Nicholas' Church once stood to the north of the modern village, and also excludes the area south of the railway that was in the parish prior to 1934. Conversely, it includes East Horndon village and parts of what were the parishes of Dunton, Childerditch and Little Warley prior to 1934, including the part of Little Warley village south of the A127 road.

Ancient parish population
1801	51
1811	30
1821	45
1831	63
1841	60
1851	62
1881	75
1891	102
1901	113
1911	123
1921	124
1931	147
source: UK census

== Geography ==
West Horndon is located 20 miles (32 km) east-northeast of Charing Cross in Central London.

The parish includes the settlements of East Horndon, Dunton Hills and West Horndon. It is predominantly a rural parish with large sections of open land within the Metropolitan Green Belt. Within the main settlement of West Horndon village are some streets of suburban houses and a small area of light industrial use. To the southeast of the parish is the Dunton Hills golf course. Little Warley Hall Lane in the northwest is the other main area of activity with some houses and the Clearview sports centre. East Horndon is a scattered settlement to the northeast and is partially located north of the A127 Southend Arterial Road. The entire parish is within the post town of Brentwood in the CM postcode area.

The entire southern boundary with the borough of Thurrock is the London, Tilbury and Southend railway line, with a small deviation to include all of West Horndon railway station. The western boundary of the parish is the Mardyke river, where the parish touches the eastern Greater London boundary at North Ockendon. The northern boundary is partially formed by the Southend Arterial Road, with some land to the northeast of it included in the parish. The eastern boundary is with the Borough of Basildon.

There are several streams running down from the hills into the Mar Dyke which drains the fens out to the Thames at Purfleet. It is the first area east of London to not be continuously built up. There are hills rising as high as 100 metres covered in trees, arable fields and a fenland of London clay.

=== West Horndon village ===
The village is surrounded by open countryside and an industrial estate. Thorndon Avenue is a long straight road leading to the heart of the modern village of West Horndon. Halfway down is the junior school with playing fields at the back, and opposite it is the modern church of St Francis. At the centre of the village is a village hall which was built around 1961. On the other side of Station Road (which runs through the centre of the village) is a housing estate, consisting of meandering roads and cul-de-sacs, bordered at the rear by the railway line. Road names on this estate are named after places in Essex, namely Fyfield Close, Clavering Gardens, Witham Gardens, Dunmow Gardens and Chafford Gardens. More modern housing exists off both sides of Station Road towards the Industrial estate and railway station. The local school is West Horndon Primary School, and the village falls within the Brentwood County High catchment area.

=== Dunton Hills garden village ===
Dunton Hills area given planning permission in 2023

Dunton Hills was designated by the government as a garden village in January 2017. The new settlement was previously envisaged to span the Brentwood/Basildon boundary (Note: 264 hectares in Brentwood and 156 hectares in Basildon) and the two councils worked together to develop proposals between November 2014 and February 2016 under the name Dunton Garden Suburb. A planning application was submitted to Brentwood Borough Council for 3,700 homes in the parish of West Horndon in August 2021. The plans were revised from the earlier cross-borough proposal with the development now more interconnected with the village of West Horndon rather than the new town of Basildon. Dunton Hills was removed from the Metropolitan Green Belt in the 2022 local plan and was allocated for development. In November 2023 the council gave planning permission for the new village. It will include three neighbourhoods called Dunton Fanns, Dunton Woods and Dunton Waters. The site contains a collection of former agricultural buildings, known as the Dunton Hills farmstead, including a Grade II listed farmhouse that will be incorporated into the new settlement.

=== Tillingham Hall ===
The area to the south of West Horndon railway station and north of Bulphan is known locally as Tillingham Hall and is in Thurrock. (Note: The area was part of the parishes of Childerditch and West Horndon prior to 1934.) In the 1980s, there was an unsuccessful proposal to build a Tillingham Hall new town on the site by a company called Consortium Developments, which applied to build a new town of the same name on the site with 5,000 homes for 14,000 people in 1984. Thurrock Council and Essex County Council opposed the project because of its threat to the green belt and their own plan to develop a new estate on brownfield land in Grays called Chafford Hundred. The local community also opposed the project because of its threat to the green belt and after a national backlash and inquiry into the matter in 1986 the government blocked the Tillingham Hall new town project in 1987.

Developer Horndon St Marys LLP revived the new town proposal in 2024. Now named Horndon St Marys, the Tillingham Hall new town is now proposed to have 2,100 homes. As it is on the border of West Horndon in the Thurrock local authority area, the application for the revived new town project is in the hands of Thurrock Council rather than Brentwood Council. Local opponents of the new town project argue that it will threaten the existing 700 home village of West Horndon by engulfing it while also threatening existing green belt land. A decision on the proposal is expected to be made by Thurrock Council sometime in 2025.

== Transport ==
West Horndon railway station is a station on the London, Tilbury and Southend main line from London to Southend. The Railway Hotel, behind the station, was once a coaching inn. North of the town and parallel to the railway is the A127 Southend Arterial Road. West Horndon is east of junction 29 of the M25 motorway.

The village is served by one main bus service (565), and two school services (49 and 481), which all serve Brentwood and are all operated by NIBS Buses.
