= East Horndon =

Village in Essex, England

Coordinates: 51.5743°N 0.3575°E

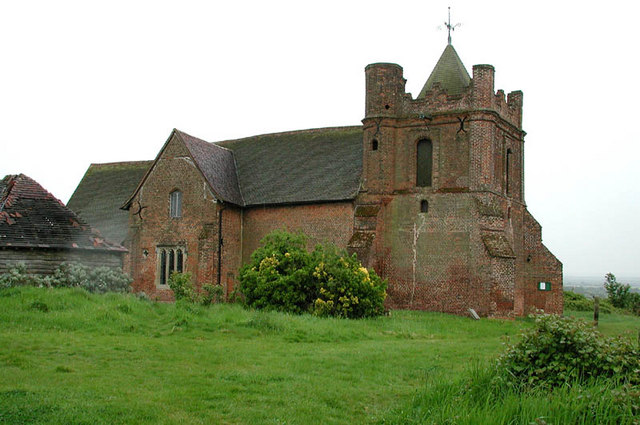
- All Saints' Church, East Horndon

- Location within Essex
- OS grid reference: TQ633888
- Civil parish: West Horndon
- District: Brentwood
- Shire county: Essex
- Region: East
- Country: England
- Sovereign state: United Kingdom
- Post town: BRENTWOOD
- Postcode district: CM13
- Dialling code: 01277
- Police: Essex
- Fire: Essex
- Ambulance: East of England
- UK Parliament: Brentwood and Ongar

East Horndon is a village in the civil parish of West Horndon, in the borough of Brentwood in Essex, England. It lies 3.5 miles (5.6 km) south-east of the centre of Brentwood. It straddles the A127 road and lies to the south of Herongate. Its former parish church of All Saints is located to the north of the A127. The church has closed and is now in the care of the Churches Conservation Trust.

== History ==
The name Horndon is Old English, and comes from horn or thorn meaning hawthorn, and dun meaning hill.

In the Domesday Book of 1086 there were three estates or manors listed at the vill of Torninduna or Torinduna in the Barstable Hundred of Essex. The area became the two parishes of East Horndon and West Horndon, with the parish of West Horndon corresponding to the manor of Thorndon Hall, and the parish of East Horndon covering the two manors of Heron (to the north) and Abbotts (to the south). The village of Herongate took its name from the manor of Heron; the village straddled the parish boundary between East Horndon and Ingrave.

By the 14th century the Tyrell family of Herongate had become the patrons of East Horndon's parish church, dedicated to All Saints. In the 15th century the old church was largely demolished and rebuilt on the same site. There is a splendid limestone figure of Alice, wife of Sir John Tyrell, flanked by her children, all named. The south and north chapels were built for the interments of the family. Up the stairs is the south gallery, which was a living room for the chantry priest in pre-Reformation times, with a Tudor fireplace. The tower is squat, with distinctive corner turrets and a stepped parapet.

To the south of the church, East Horndon is reduced to the original old road to Herongate, winding up the hill, two restaurants and two houses. Crossing the road bridge to the other side and returning the way we have come, we find the old road running off towards the Thames, and in its angle is East Horndon Hall, the old manor or Abbots. There is reputed to have been a tunnel from the Hall to the church across the present Southend Road.

The London, Tilbury and Southend railway built its new shorter inland route to Southend in the 1880s, to relieve congestion on the original main line to the south. East Horndon railway station opened on the new route in 1886. It was named after East Horndon as the larger settlement at that time, although the station was actually in West Horndon parish. West Horndon was a very sparsely populated parish when the station was built; its parish church of St Nicholas had been demolished in 1734 after West Horndon had been united for ecclesiastical purposes with Ingrave in 1712, and much of the parish was the parkland of Thorndon Hall. The southern part of West Horndon parish where the station was built was open farmland. A new village of West Horndon subsequently grew up around the station, and the station was renamed West Horndon in 1949.

The ecclesiastical parishes in the area were reorganised in 1961. West Horndon was separated from Ingrave and merged instead with East Horndon. All Saints' Church at East Horndon was declared redundant in 1970 and is now looked after by the Churches Conservation Trust. The modern church of St Francis at West Horndon now serves as the Anglican parish church for the ecclesiastical parish of East and West Horndon.

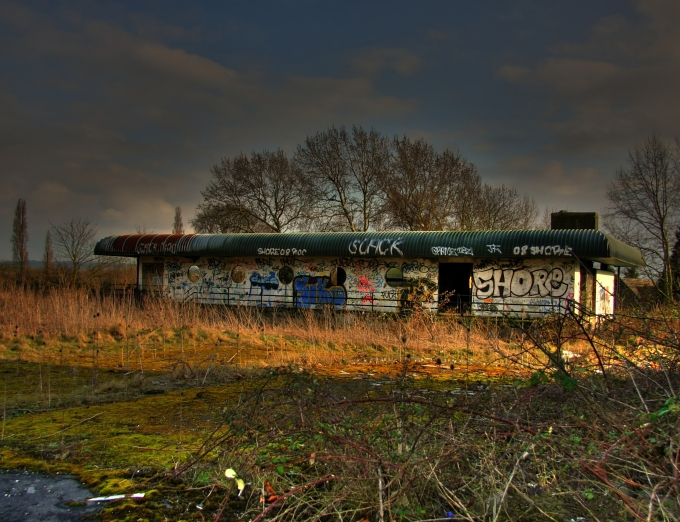
The derelict petrol station which was once known as Elliots

East Horndon once had a petrol station with a nightclub known as "Elliott's", which was renamed Twilights in the mid-1980s. The club was opened during the early 1980s and closed in 1989. At the time of closure, everything was abandoned and left behind, including beer, furniture and equipment. The nightclub and petrol station remained until recently, and was a popular urban exploration hotspot. The site has now been redeveloped into residential properties.

=== Administrative history ===
East Horndon was an ancient parish in the Barstable Hundred of Essex. When elected parish and district councils were established in 1894 it was included in the Billericay Rural District. In 1934 a County Review Order abolished the rural district and the civil parish of East Horndon. The part of East Horndon parish north of the railway, including the village itself, was added to the urban district of Brentwood. The part of East Horndon parish south of the railway was temporarily added to the new Billericay Urban District; four years later in 1938 that area south of the railway was transferred instead to Thurrock Urban District. At the 1931 census (the last before the abolition of the civil parish), East Horndon had a population of 440.

East Horndon village has been administered as part of Brentwood since 1934. The area became unparished when the urban district was enlarged to become the modern Brentwood district in 1974. A new civil parish called West Horndon was created in 2003 from part of the unparished area, providing an additional tier of local government for that area. The new parish of West Horndon also includes East Horndon village.
