= All Saints Church, East Horndon =

All Saints' Church, East Horndon
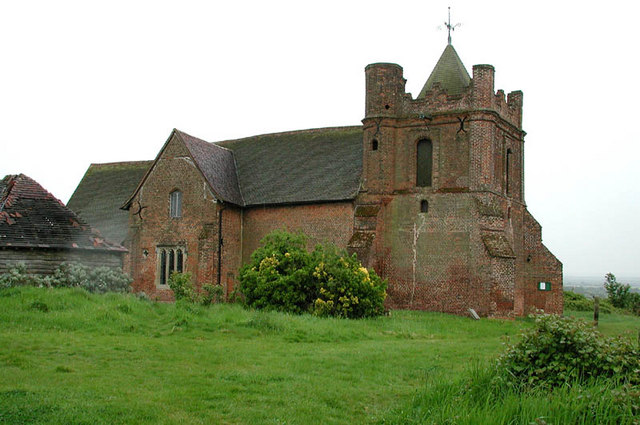
- All Saints' Church from the northwest, part of the stable on the left

- Location in Essex
- OS grid reference: TQ 6355 8953
- Location: East Horndon, Essex
- Country: England
- Denomination: Anglican
- Website: Churches Conservation Trust

Architecture
- Functional status: Redundant
- Heritage designation: Grade II*
- Designated: 21 October 1958
- Architectural type: Church
- Style: Gothic

Specifications
- Materials: Brick with stone dressings

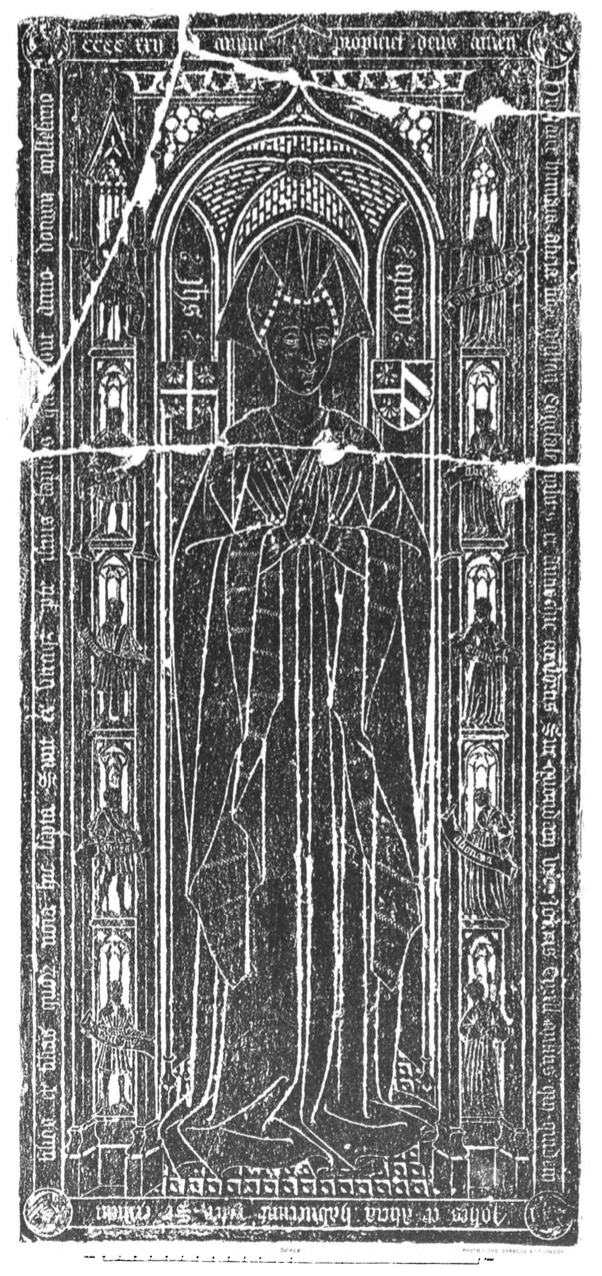
Incised Slab to the memory of Lady Alice Tyrell, 1422

All Saints' Church is a redundant Anglican church in the village of East Horndon, Essex, England. It is recorded in the National Heritage List for England as a designated Grade II* listed building, and is under the care of the Churches Conservation Trust. The church stands north of the village, and northwest of the junction between the A127 and A128 roads, some 4 miles (6 km) south of Brentwood.

== Early history ==
The church was built in the last quarter of the 15th century by the Tyrell family of nearby Heron Hall (51.600962°N 0.366308°E) to replace an earlier church on the site. The south chapel and the porch were added in the first quarter of the following century. The upper stage of the tower was rebuilt in the 17th century. During the 19th century, the fabric of the church deteriorated, by the 1890s it was "almost ruinous", and it was closed in 1898. During the next ten years the church was restored by George Frederick Bodley to return it to as near as possible to its original condition. However, it was allowed to deteriorate again. During the Second World War, a bomb exploded close to the church, destroying much of the stained glass and weakening its structure. After the war, a tramp set the tower alight, and thieves stole items from the church, including its four bells. Then vandals caused more damage. The font and the surviving monuments were removed to museums for safe keeping.

== Architecture ==
=== Exterior ===
All Saints is constructed in red brick, with English bond brickwork, and stone dressings. Its plan consists of a three-bay nave with north and south two-storey transepts, a chancel with north and south chapels, a south porch, and a west tower. The tower is in two stages, with large corner buttresses. The buttresses continue upwards and become turrets at the corners. In the upper stage are round-headed bell openings. The parapet is stepped. On top of the tower is a shingled pyramidal roof, surmounted by a weather vane. In the centre of the south side of the church is a gabled transept. In its lower storey is a square-headed three-light window, above this is a small window with a brick surround, and in the gable is a sundial. To the west of the transept is a porch, continuous with the transept, with a pilaster buttress at the junction. Above the entrance to the porch is an arched recess, and at its west corner is a diagonal buttress. Inside the porch is the original seating. The porch leads to the doorway into the church, which dates from about 1500. In the spandrels over the archway are carvings of a shield and a Tudor rose. To the west of the porch is a tall window with a brick surround. To the east of the transept, protruding from the chancel is a two-bay chapel. This contains two square-headed windows, one with two lights, and one with three lights. On the corners are diagonal buttresses. On the north side of the church there is also a central transept. It has similar windows to those in the south transept, plus another square-framed window. To the east of this, in the north wall of the chancel, is a window with an arched head. There are no windows in the north chapel, but there are two large crosses on pedestals. The east window in the chancel has a three-light window with a stone surround, dating from the 19th century.

=== Interior ===
On the north wall of the nave are monuments to the Powell family, forerunners of Robert Baden-Powell, founder of the Scout movement. Beside the south door is a damaged stoup. The north transept contains a narrow brick staircase leading to the upper storey. The upper room of the transept is joined to the corresponding room in the south transept by a beam, the only remaining part of a rood screen. The pulpit dating from about 1700 was destroyed by vandals in 1971. In the chancel, a small chapel known as the Founder's Tomb projects from the north wall. A single fragment of medieval stained glass is in one of the chancel windows. The 15th-century chancel roof was damaged during the Second World War, but the parts that have survived include bosses carved with flowers, fruit, shields and angels. There is a two-bay arcade between the chancel and the south chapel. This is known as the Tyrell Chapel and contains memorials to members of the Tyrell family. The oldest monument is to Lady Alice Tyrell who died in 1422. This had been moved to Layer Marney in 1969 for safety, but was returned here in 1976. There are marble wall monuments to other members of the Tyrell family, with dates in the 17th and 18th centuries. Under the floor of the chapel is a small crypt, now sealed. In the south transept is an altar tomb dating from about 1520, and in the upper storey is a medieval fireplace and chimney. A staircase leads from the upper storey room down to the porch.

Many of the fittings have been stolen or moved elsewhere. A font dating from about 1200, formerly in the north transept, has been moved to Great Wakering in Essex. An escutcheon or shield formerly above the Founder's Tomb has been moved to Layer Marney church. A black marble floor-slab to the memory of Sir John Tyrell who died in 1675 is in Heron Hall. The most important monument was made by Joseph Nollekens to Sir John Tyrell, 5th baronet, who died in 1766. This is now in the Victoria and Albert Museum in London.

== Recent history and present day ==
In 1970 a committee was formed in an attempt to save and preserve the church. Work was undertaken to make the building as safe and as waterproof as possible. The All Saints Society was formed to raise money, donations were received from individuals, and grants were made by the Friends of Friendless Churches, the Ford Trust of Britain, and Essex County Council. The church was declared redundant on 13 November 1970, and it became vested in the Redundant Churches Fund, the forerunners of the Churches Conservation Trust. The Trust has organised further repairs and restorations. An organisation known as the Friends of All Saints East Horndon arranges events in the church.

On New Year's Eve 2020, the church was broken into and an illegal party was held, despite the considerable COVID-19 regulations in force at the time. Police, called to clear the church of several hundred partygoers, had objects thrown at them and were threatened. Several men were arrested on Drugs and Public Order offences. It is estimated that at least £5,000 worth of damage was caused to the church by the party.

In 2021, a new volunteering team was formed who began to address issues of antisocial behaviour on and around the church grounds. New CCTV was part-funded by Brentwood Borough Council

== External features ==
In the churchyard is a memorial to members of the Freman family. It consists of an enclosure surrounded by railings, containing three 18th-century tombs in Portland stone. It has been listed at Grade II. Also listed at Grade II and associated with the church is a small 17th-century timber-framed stable. There are the war graves of a Northamptonshire Regiment soldier of World War I, and two airmen of World War II.

== See also ==
- List of churches preserved by the Churches Conservation Trust in the East of England
