= Barstable Hundred =

Coordinates: 51.55°N 0.40°E

Barstable hundred
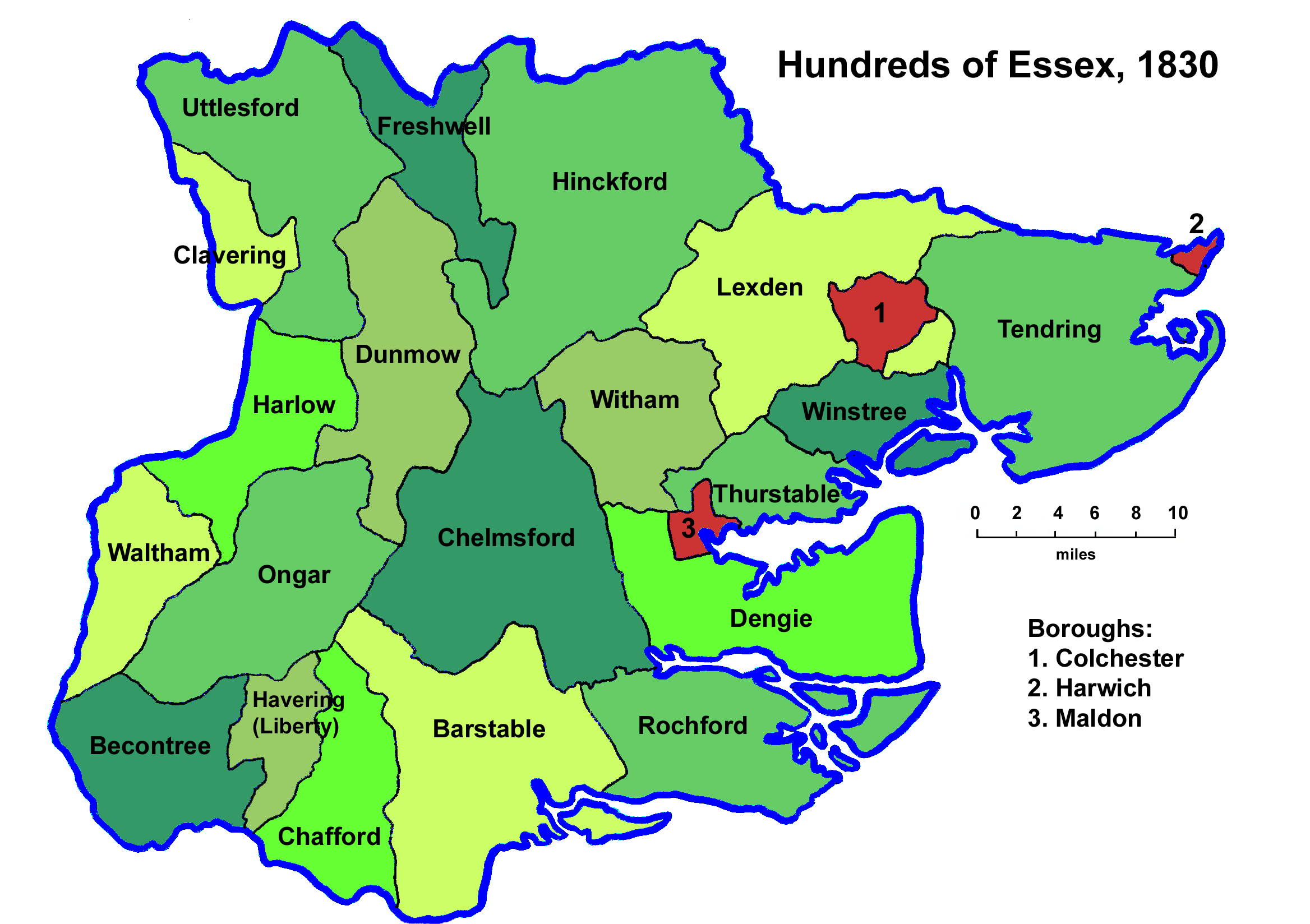
- The Hundreds of Essex in 1830
- Area
  - 1887: 71,373 acres (28,884 ha)
- History
  - Created: Anglo-Saxon
  - Abolished: no formal administrative or legal role after 1886, but never formally abolished.
  - Succeeded by: various, see text
- Status: hundred

Barstable was a Hundred in the English County of Essex. Both the hundred and the manor with the same name are mentioned in the Domesday Book of 1086. Several parishes in the western part of the Barstable Hundred are now in Thurrock.

== Location ==
Part of plate XXII from the Chapman & André 1777 map of Essex, showing the location of Barstable Hall and Little Barstable Hall at top right

Barstable is bordered on the east by Rochford hundred; on the north by Chelmsford hundred; on the north-west by the Ongar hundred; on the west by Chafford hundred (with the boundary in part following the Mardyke) and on the south by the river Thames. The parish boundary between Grays Thurrock and Little Thurrock is also the hundred boundary between Barstable and Chafford. The interlocking boundary between these parishes suggests the existence of a common pasture originally shared, prior to the establishment of the hundred boundary.

== Name ==
The name of the hundred was normally that of its meeting place. Barstable hundred takes its name from a location or settlement that is now in Basildon, a new town. This is mentioned as the manor of Barstable Hall, as Little Barstable Hall, and as Barstable Hall, alias Basildon Hall. Ernest Godman, writing in Home Counties magazine quotes the historian Philip Morant as saying the name "appears to have been taken from the place now called Barstable Hall, in Langdon and Basildon ... which being near the centre of the Hundred, was then the most convenient place for holding Courts, and transacting all affairs of a public nature." The name of the hundred is frequently written as Barnstable in older documents. The name appears as Berdestapla in Domesday. P.H. Reaney suggests that the first element of the place-name may be a person or a descriptive adjective. However, more recent work suggests it comes from berde – a battle axe. The second element is a post or pillar. The post would have marked the meeting place for the hundred.

== Meeting point ==
During the Saxon period, the men of the hundred met to discuss local issues and to conduct judicial trials. The moot site for the Barstable hundred was said to be close to the former Barstable Hall. Reaney says, "The old hall was near the junction of the boundaries of the parishes of Laindon, Corringham, Vange and Basildon". Still, there is no common boundary involving Corringham, Laindon and Vange. A Laindon court roll, dated 1573, mentions a motehill. If the location of the meeting place was close to the site of the now-demolished Basildon Hall, it would have been in Basildon parish, about 550 yards (500 m) from the boundary with the parish of Vange. According to Godman, "the manor-house had disappeared before Morant's time, a farmhouse being built in a lower situation. This has been in its turn deserted, and the buildings now remaining are fragmentary." Anderson says "the original hall stood further south", "at the highest point in the parish". According to another source, this was destroyed by an explosion in 1834, and may now be under the railway line. The original location would have been close to the geographic centre of the hundred. The modern district of Barstable in Basildon new town is largely in the traditional parish of Vange.

However, David Roffe notes that the Hundred Rolls for the Barstable hundred were the verdicts of a hundred court held at Horndon-on-the-Hill.

== Parishes ==
- Basildon
- Bowers Gifford
- Bulphan
- Chadwell
- Corringham
- Doddinghurst
- Downham
- Dunton
- East Horndon
- East Tilbury
- Fobbing
- Great Burstead
- Horndon-on-the-Hill
- Hutton
- Ingrave
- Laindon
- Langdon Hills
- Lee Chapel
- Little Burstead
- Little Thurrock
- Mucking
- Nevendon
- North Benfleet
- Orsett
- Pitsea
- Ramsden Bellhouse
- Ramsden Crays
- Shenfield
- South Benfleet
- Stanford-le-Hope
- Thundersley
- Vange
- West Horndon
- West Tilbury
- Wickford

Canvey Island, which was also in the Barstable hundred, was divided among a number of nearby parishes. Wheatley was recorded in Barstable hundred on Domesday, but later records put it in the Rochford hundred.
