= Hundred of Chafford =

Historical division of Essex, England

Coordinates: 51.52965°N 0.25332°E

Chafford Hundred
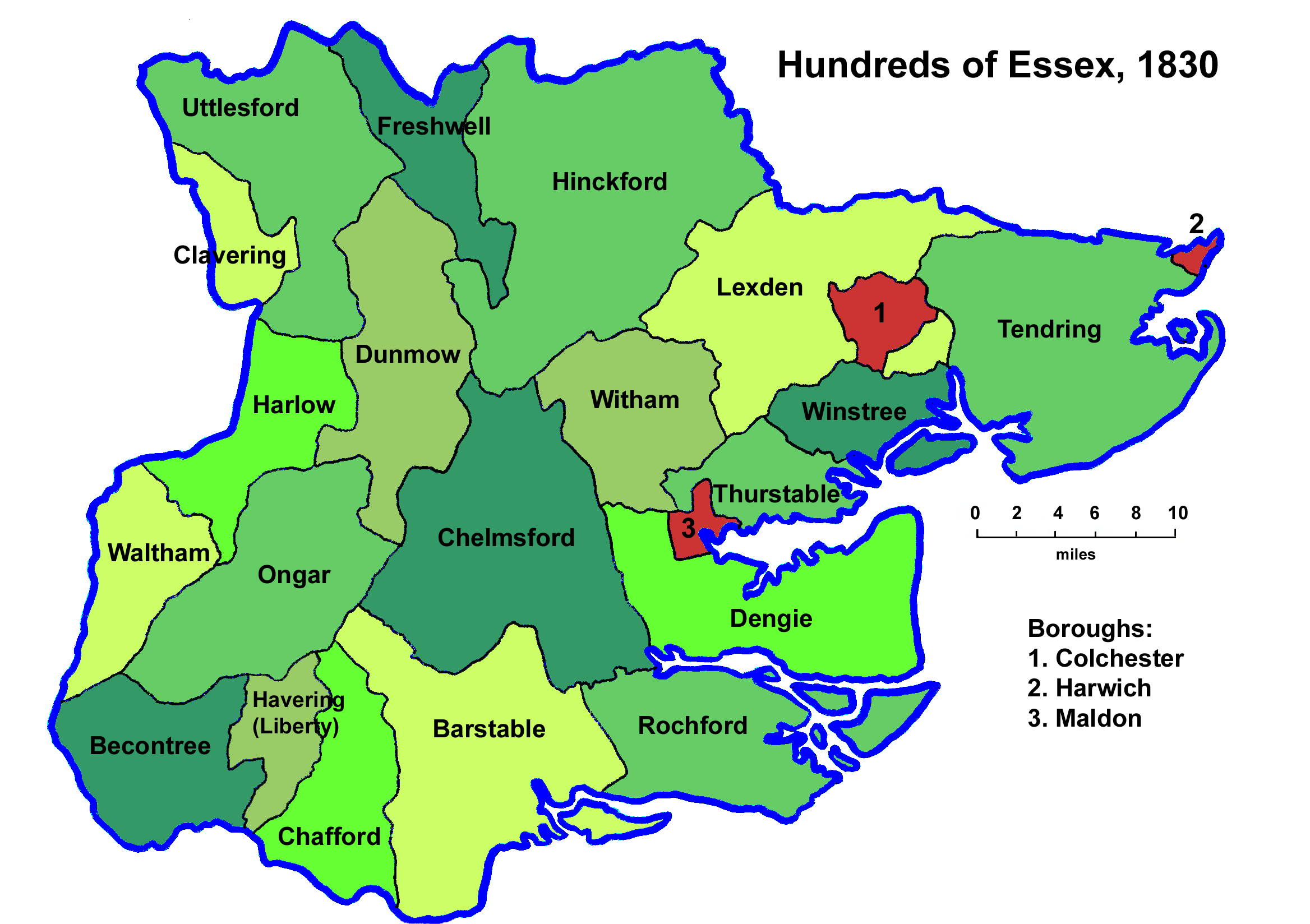
- The Hundreds of Essex in 1830
- Area
  - 1870: 35,712 acres (144.52 km^{2})
  - 1887: 34,703 acres (140.44 km^{2})
- Population
  - 1870: 16,001
  - 1887: 23,839
- History
  - Created: Anglo-Saxon
  - Abolished: no administrative or legal role after 1886, but never formally abolished.
  - Succeeded by: various, see text
- Status: hundred
  - HQ: Chafford Heath

Chafford was an ancient hundred in the south west of the county of Essex, England. Its area has been partly absorbed by the growth of London; with its name reused for the modern housing development of Chafford Hundred. Its former area now corresponds to part of the London Borough of Havering in Greater London and parts of the districts of Brentwood and Thurrock in Essex.

== History ==
Hundred meetings are thought to have taken place in Chafford Heath (grid reference TQ564836) in the southern part of the ecclesiastical parish of Upminster.

The hundred contained the parishes of Aveley, Brentwood, Childerditch, Cranham, Grays Thurrock, Great Warley, Little Warley, North Ockendon, Rainham, South Ockendon, South Weald, Stifford, Upminster, Wennington and West Thurrock.

It bordered Ongar hundred to the north, Barstable hundred to the east and Havering liberty to the west. The River Thames formed a 7-mile (11 km) boundary with Kent to the south. The hundred covered a narrow area stretching 12 miles (19 km) northwards from the river.

== Replacement ==
The hundreds of England declined in administrative use because of the rise of various ad-hoc boards. By 1894 they were effectively replaced by a system of uniform local government districts, which were consolidated over time and finally replaced by the London boroughs (1965) and non-metropolitan districts (1974), further change occurred in 1998 when Thurrock became a unitary authority.

Parish	District	Today
Aveley	Orsett Rural District	Thurrock
Brentwood	Billericay Rural District	Brentwood
Childerditch	Billericay Rural District	Brentwood
Cranham	Romford Rural District	Havering
Grays Thurrock	Grays Thurrock Urban District	Thurrock
Great Warley	Romford Rural District	Brentwood
Little Warley	Billericay Rural District	Brentwood
North Ockendon	Orsett Rural District	Havering
Rainham	Romford Rural District	Havering
South Ockendon	Orsett Rural District	Thurrock
South Weald	Billericay Rural District	Brentwood
Stifford	Orsett Rural District	Thurrock
Upminster	Romford Rural District	Havering
Wennington	Romford Rural District	Havering
West Thurrock	Orsett Rural District	Thurrock

== See also ==
- Hundreds of Essex
