= Warley, Essex =

Suburb of Brentwood, Essex, England

Warley
- Location within Essex
- Population: 5,100 (Ward, 2022)
- OS grid reference: TQ592923
- District: Brentwood
- Shire county: Essex
- Region: East
- Country: England
- Sovereign state: United Kingdom
- Post town: BRENTWOOD
- Postcode district: CM13, CM14
- Dialling code: 01277
- Police: Essex
- Fire: Essex
- Ambulance: East of England
- UK Parliament: Brentwood and Ongar
- List of places UK England Essex 51.606°N 0.298°E

Warley is a suburb of Brentwood in Essex, situated to the south of the town. It was notable for being home to the British headquarters of Ford Motor Company prior to their office closure.

== Geography ==
Warley occupies an approximate area to the south of Brentwood town centre. Its northern boundary is approximately the Great Eastern Main Line, including Brentwood railway station, its southern boundary Mascalls Lane and Eagle Way, and its eastern boundary Hartswood Road. Consequently, to the north west it borders South Weald, to the south west the village of Great Warley, to the south east the villages of Little Warley and Childerditch and to the east the village of Ingrave. Development is concentrated along Warley Hill, which runs approximately north–south through Warley, with the Crescent Road, Clements Park and Mascalls Park areas to the west of the road, and the Warley Mount, Hartswood and Warley Barracks developments to the east of the road.

There is also a Borough of Brentwood council ward by the name Warley, which incorporates some adjoining rural areas but omits the Crescent Road and Warley Mount areas closer to the railway station. Traditionally it has been a Liberal Democrat-Conservative marginal, which in 2007 elected the youngest councillor in Britain, at eighteen years of age. As of 2025 the ward is represented by three Liberal Democrat councillors.

== History ==
The area now known as Warley was not significantly developed prior to 19th century, with Warley Common occupying much of the area to the east of Warley Road. In 1805 116 acres of the common were sold to create Warley Barracks, but the bulk of development followed the arrival of the Eastern Countries railway in 1840 and subsequent enclosure of the remaining 172 acres of Warley Common in 1843. Essex County Lunatic Asylum (a psychiatric hospital) was opened in 1853 and Ilford, Limited opened a photographic factory on Woodman Road in 1903, creating further demand for housing in the area. Both sites were subsequently closed and redeveloped, with the Asylum (later Warley Hospital and Mascalls Park Mental Hospital) becoming the Clements Park, Galleries and Mascalls Park estates, and the photographic factory becoming the Brackenwood estate.

== Amenities ==
Warley Primary School and Holly Trees Primary School are both located in Warley, as well as a number of green spaces (Warley Country Park, Hampden Wood, Warley Playing Fields, Donkey Lane Plantation). Medical facilities include Beechwood GP Surgery, a Day Lewis pharmacy, and Spire Hartswood Hospital (opened 1984). It is served by Brentwood railway station as well as a number of local bus routes. Local religious facilities include the Christ Church (Church of England; constructed in 1855), Holy Cross and All Saints Church (Catholic; constructed in 1881) and Brentwood Mosque (constructed in 1892 as Warley Hill Methodist Church). Woodman Road Cemetery was opened in 1927. Local pubs include the Essex Arms and the Brave Nelson.

== Military history ==
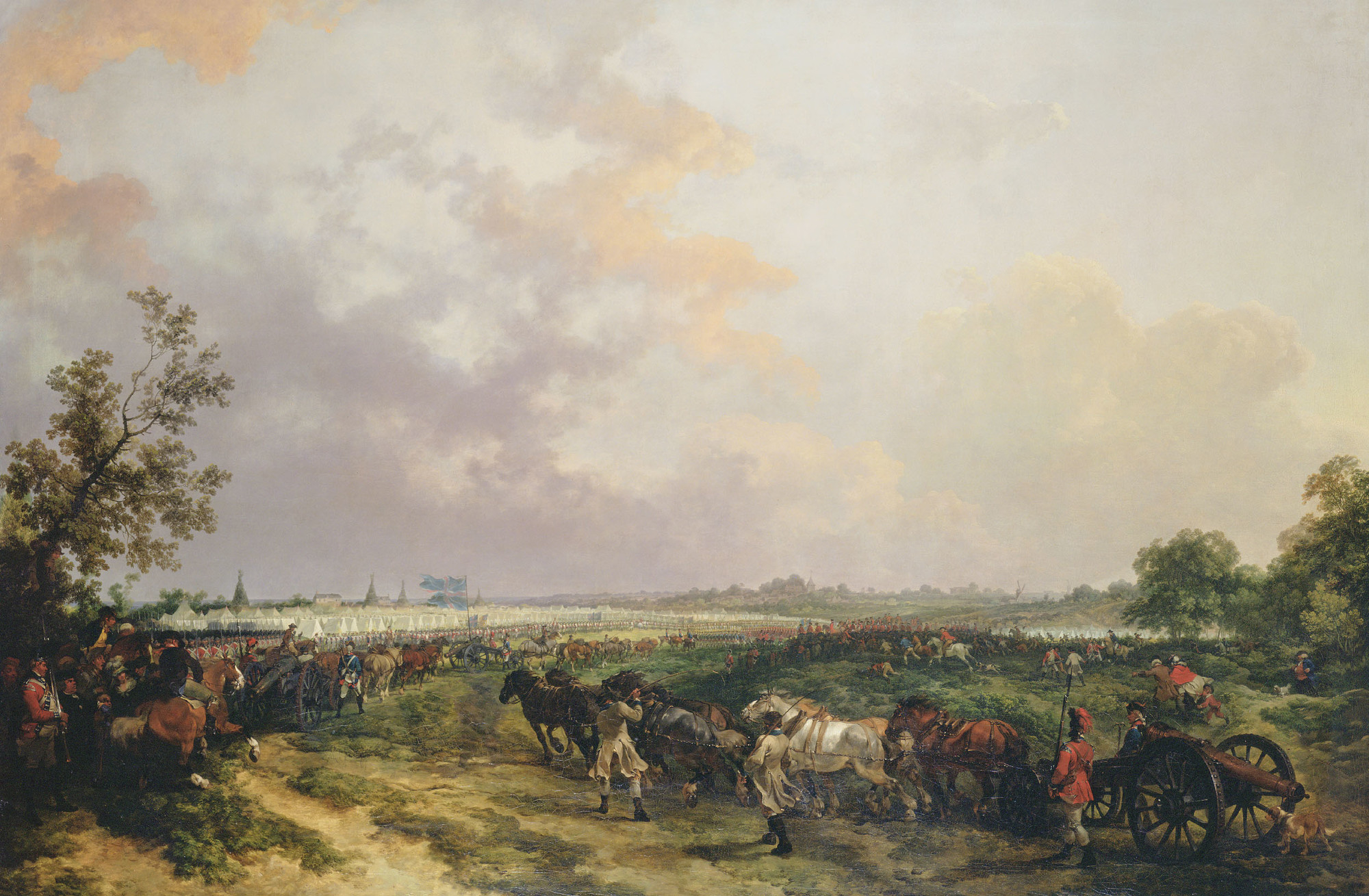
Warley Camp by Philip James de Loutherbourg. It depicts a military camp on Warley Common during the American War of Independence.

The military has associations with Warley going back over 200 years. It also had strategic importance during the time of the Spanish Armada – it was used as a meeting place for contingents from eight eastern and midland counties (900 horsemen assembled here) to then travel on to Tilbury. The local common was used as a military camp in 1742, and became a permanent feature as Warley Barracks in 1804.

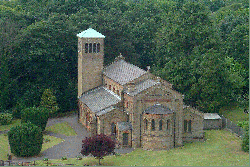
Essex Regiment Chapel

The Essex Regiment Chapel is located in Eagle Way (51.5991°N 0.2977°E). The chapel was built in 1857 and is a Grade II listed building. It was originally built for the East India Company, but with the establishment of the Essex Regiment Depot at Warley, the chapel became the regiment's "home" church. The chapel's interior contains displays of regimental history, memorials, heraldry and regimental colours. The chapel is open by appointment, and on regimental heritage days.

The chapel is near the Warley (Brentwood) Army Reserve drill hall, which is the headquarters of 124 Petroleum Squadron, part of 151 (London) Transport Regiment of the Royal Logistic Corps.

In 1959, when Warley barracks were closed, Brentwood U.D.C. bought part of the site, using it to build houses, shops, and flats. The site of the old regimental depot and barracks was redeveloped in the 1960s for the headquarters of the Ford Motor Company (architect T.P. Bennett). This closed in 2019 and as of 2025 is being redeveloped as the Warley HQ estate. Most of the barracks have been demolished and only the chapel, the officers' mess (now Marillac Nursing Home) and one of the regimental gyms (Keys Hall) remain.
