= Thorndon Hall =

Grade I listed building in the United Kingdom

Coordinates: 51°36′N 0°20′E

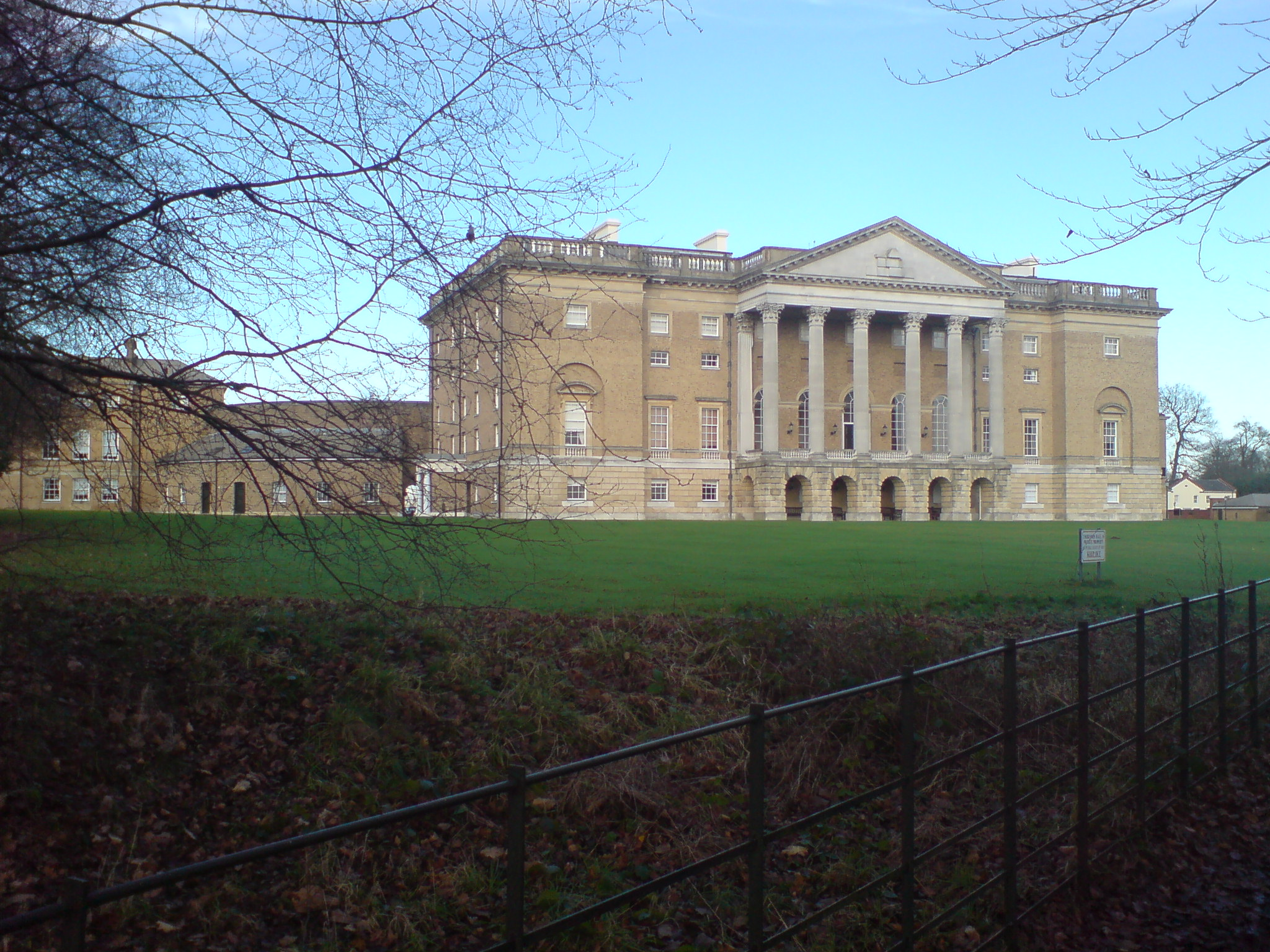
Thorndon Hall, Thorndon Park, Essex.

Thorndon Hall is a Georgian Palladian country house within Thorndon Park, Ingrave, Essex, England, approximately two miles south of Brentwood and 25 miles (40 km) from central London.

Formerly the country seat of the Petre family who now reside at nearby Ingatestone Hall, the house is located within nearly 600 acres (240 ha) of ancient medieval deer park, meadows and forest. The garden is designed by Capability Brown.

Thorndon Hall is Grade-I listed with English Heritage, and the park is Grade II*-listed.

== Old Thorndon Hall ==
The estate of Thorndon Hall, known previously as the manor of West Horndon, can trace its records back to the Domesday Book of 1086, commissioned by William the Conqueror. However, a building on the site of Old Thorndon Hall was first recorded in 1414 when King Henry V of England gave licence for its new owner, a merchant from South Wales called Lewis John, to "empark 300 acres (120 ha), to surround his lodge within this park with walls and to crenellate and embattle the lodge". The current house replaced Old Thorndon Hall which was located about a mile to the south in what is now known as "ruin wood" next to Old Hall pond. The old hall was damaged by fire in the early 18th century and was subsequently pulled down after being used briefly as farm buildings.

== Present house ==
The present house was designed by the fashionable neoclassical architect James Paine and construction started in 1764. The portico of the present house was originally commissioned and imported from Italy in 1742 for use on the old hall which had been remodelled by Giacomo Leoni in the Palladian style. Following the fire at the Old Hall, it was kept, and reused in the design of the present house.

The estate and newly finished house was visited in 1778 by King George III and Queen Charlotte on their visit to see the troops at nearby Warley Common.

Following a fire in 1878, much of the main house and west wing were gutted leaving a shell and destroying or damaging many of the Petre picture collection. The east wing was rebuilt in 1894 to designs by George Campbell Sherrin into a separate home, with plans to renovate the house back to its original grandeur. However Petre family finances were in a poor state after the Great War and in 1920 the house and a portion of the estate was leased to Thorndon Park Golf Club. Originally, the company had planned to develop the estate into a luxury housing development and golf course, much the same as the Wentworth Club and St. George's Hill in Surrey, but with the introduction of London green belt legislation limiting house building on farm and parkland, the plan could not go ahead and the company folded.

== Garden ==
When Lord Petre inherited in 1732 he commissioned the planting of many thousands of trees, including exotic species brought from North America. The park was landscaped between 1766 and 1772 by Lancelot 'Capability' Brown at a cost of £5,000, much of which still survives, albeit merged into the landscaping of Thorndon Park Golf Course. The main driveway extended from what is now Shenfield Common for nearly two miles southwards to the northern face of the house. It can still be traced with maps, although it is now made up of public country parks and golf courses.

The first recorded camellia, Camellia japonica – a cousin of the tea plant, Camellia sinensis – to grow in Great Britain was introduced at Thorndon Hall in the 1730s. Fifteen years later, the camellia was thriving around the country, and by the 19th century country houses were adding camellia houses just to grow the pink flowers.

== Later years ==
The golf club eventually acquired the house and grounds, but chose to move out of the main hall and construct its purpose-built clubhouse within the grounds. In 1976, Thorndon Hall was sold to a developer, Thomas Bates & Son, Romford, who converted the mansion sympathetically to luxury apartments and cottages in landscaped surroundings, woodlands and parkland. Parts of the former park had been sold off during the twentieth century for development on the outskirts of Brentwood. Essex County Council manages extensive areas as the public Thorndon Country Park. The nearby Petre family mortuary chapel is now owned by the Historic Chapels Trust.

== Nearest places ==
- Brentwood
- Ingrave
- East Horndon
- West Horndon
- Bulphan
- Warley
- Laindon
