= The Brick House, Great Warley =

Coordinates: 51°34′34″N 0°17′59″E

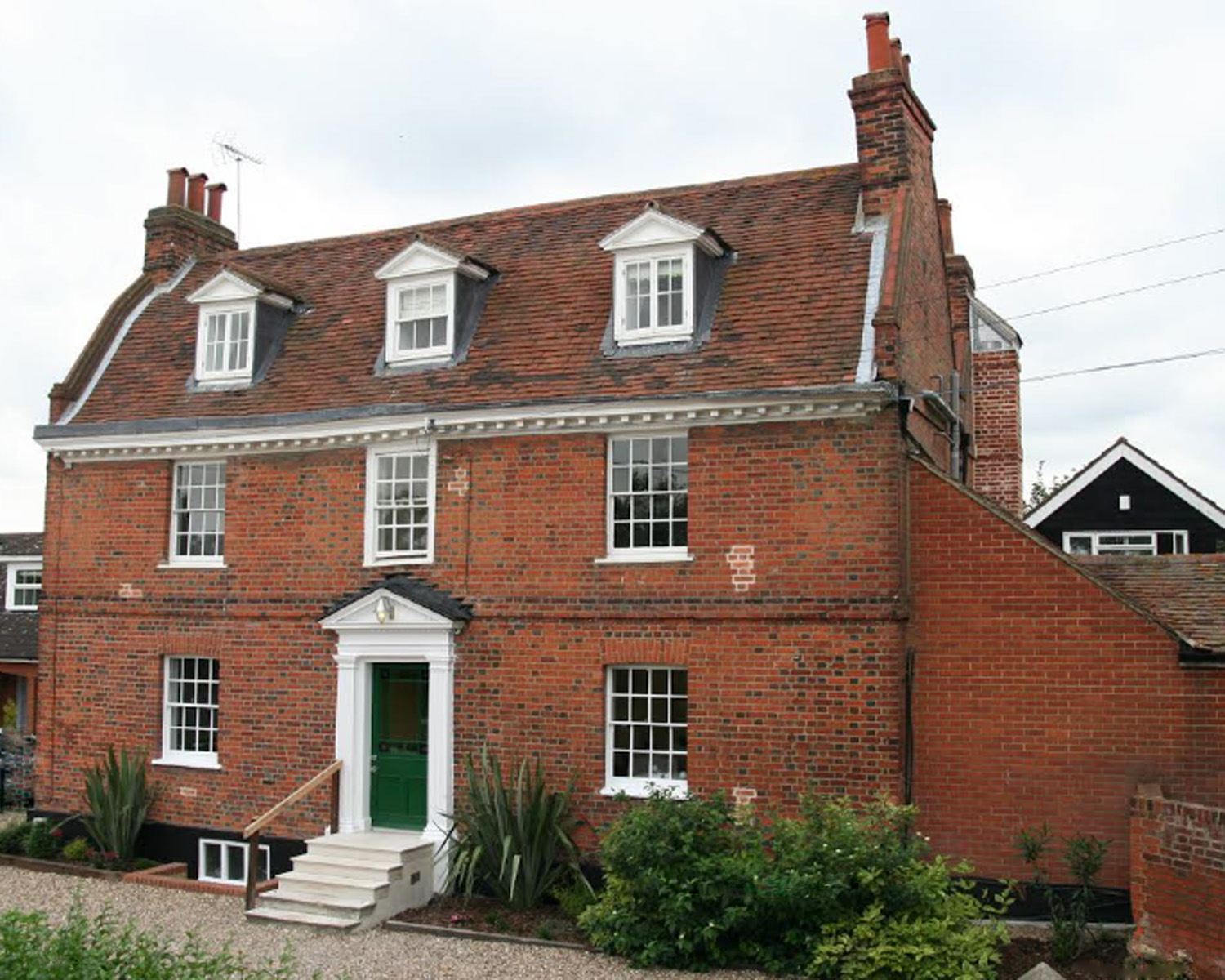
The Brick House now called The Kilns Hotel.

The Brick House in Great Warley, Essex, is a Grade II listed building which is on the English Heritage Register. The main part of the building is a Queen Anne structure which was built in the early 18th century but part of the house dates back to the 16th century. It is now a hotel called The Kilns Hotel.

== Early residents ==
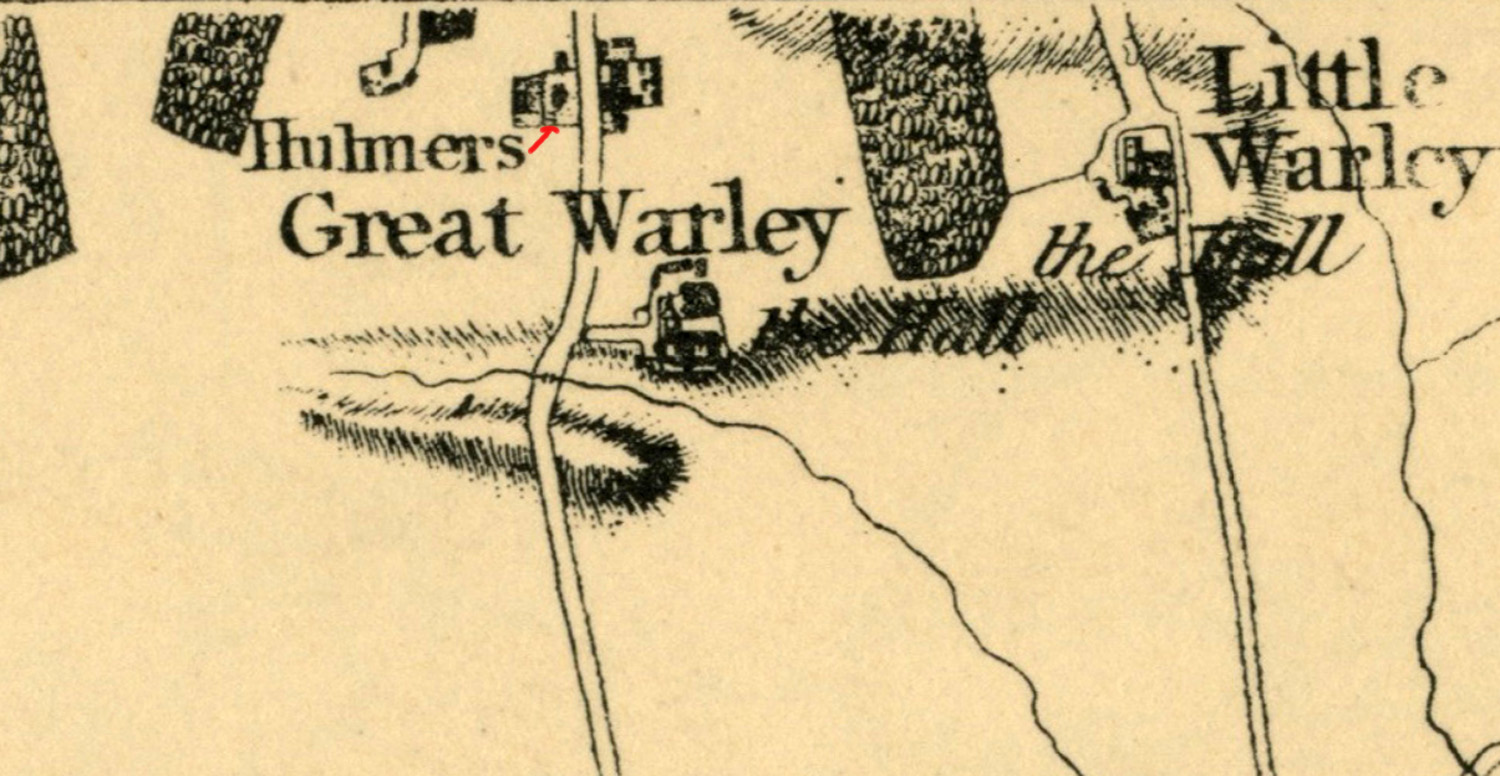
Map of the two houses called Hulmers in 1777

The house dates back to the 16th century and appears to have been the main residence of the Hulmers Estate before the present Hulmers House (which is next door) was built in the late 18th century. The Evidence for this is a map of 1777, which shows that both buildings are called Hulmers. In the map it appears that the upper building may have been built recently, as it has not yet been surrounded by a garden. However the lower house (which is the Kilns Hotel) has an established garden and appears to be the main residence.

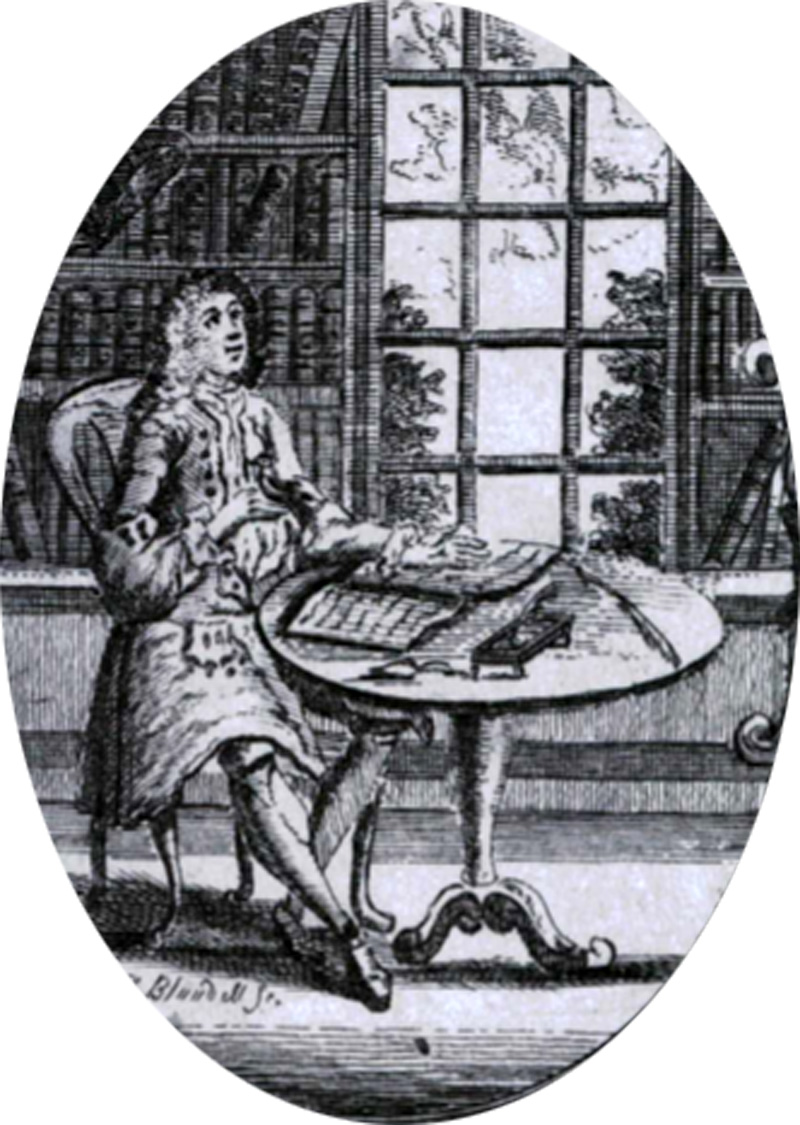
John Arnold in about 1760

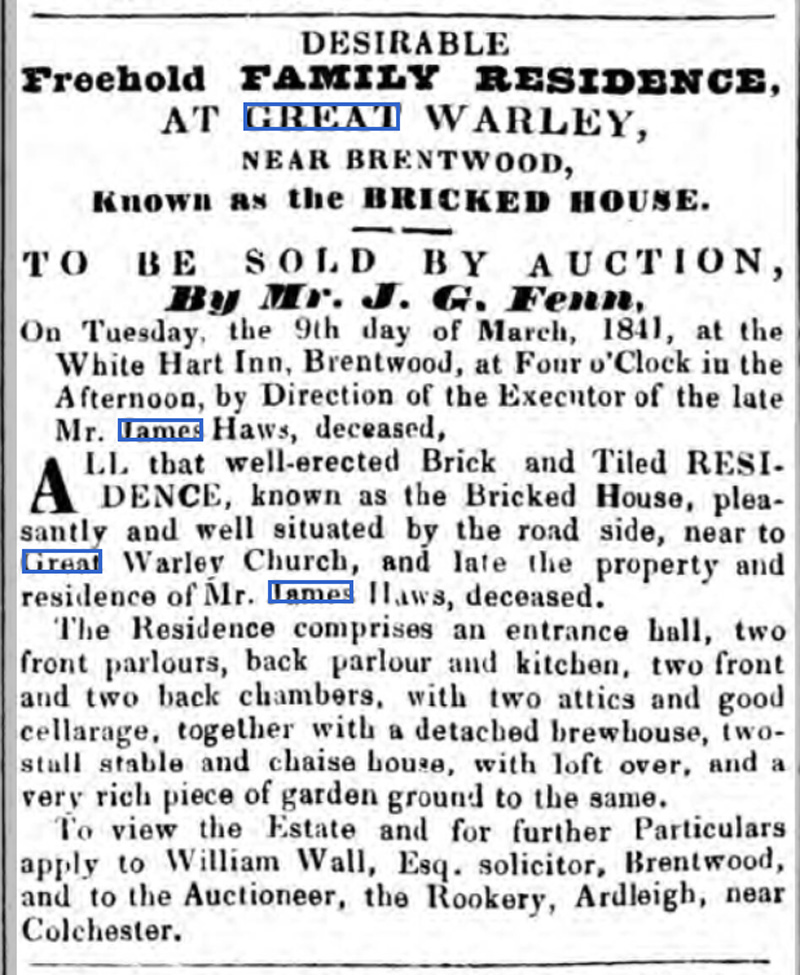
Advertisement for the sale of Bricked House (now the Kilns Hotel) in 1841

At this time the owner of Hulmers was the composer John Arnold. A New and Complete History of Essex which was published in 1770 and therefore before the current Hulmers House was built describes the property as follows.

"Hulmers is a neat little house about half a mile north of the Church the property and residence of Mr Arnold the ingenious author of several musical treaties."

John Arnold (1720–1792) was born in Great Warley in 1720. His father was a gentleman farmer who owned several farms in the village. The Arnold family had been living in Great Warley for many years and records show he, his father and his grandfather are all buried in the old churchyard. John was a musical prodigy and by the time he was nineteen he had written his first book of psalms, which was published in 1739. He continued to write throughout his life . In 1753 he married Elizabeth Sackett who was the daughter of a wealthy landowner Thomas Sackett from Hornchurch. The marriage notice in the London Evening Post read as follows.

"A few Days since Mr. John Arnold, jun. of Great Warley in Essex, Gentleman Farmer, author of the Compleat Psalmodist and Essex Harmony, was married, at Hornchurch in the same County, to Miss Sackett of Hornchurch, a young Lady of fine accomplishments, and a good fortune."

The couple had four children but two died at an early age leaving two surviving daughters. His wife died in 1766 and he died in 1792.

It is unknown when the two houses were divided into separate land titles, but by about 1840 the Tithe records show that the grandchildren of John Arnold owned the present house called Hulmers and James Haws owned the house now called the Kilns Hotel.

James Haws (1779–1840) was from a wealthy Great Warley family. His father had died in 1818 leaving him a large amount of property. In 1808 he married Elizabeth Cooper. He died in 1840 and the house was advertised for sale in 1841. At this time the property was called “Bricked House”. It was later called Brick House. The advertisement is shown.

== Later residents ==
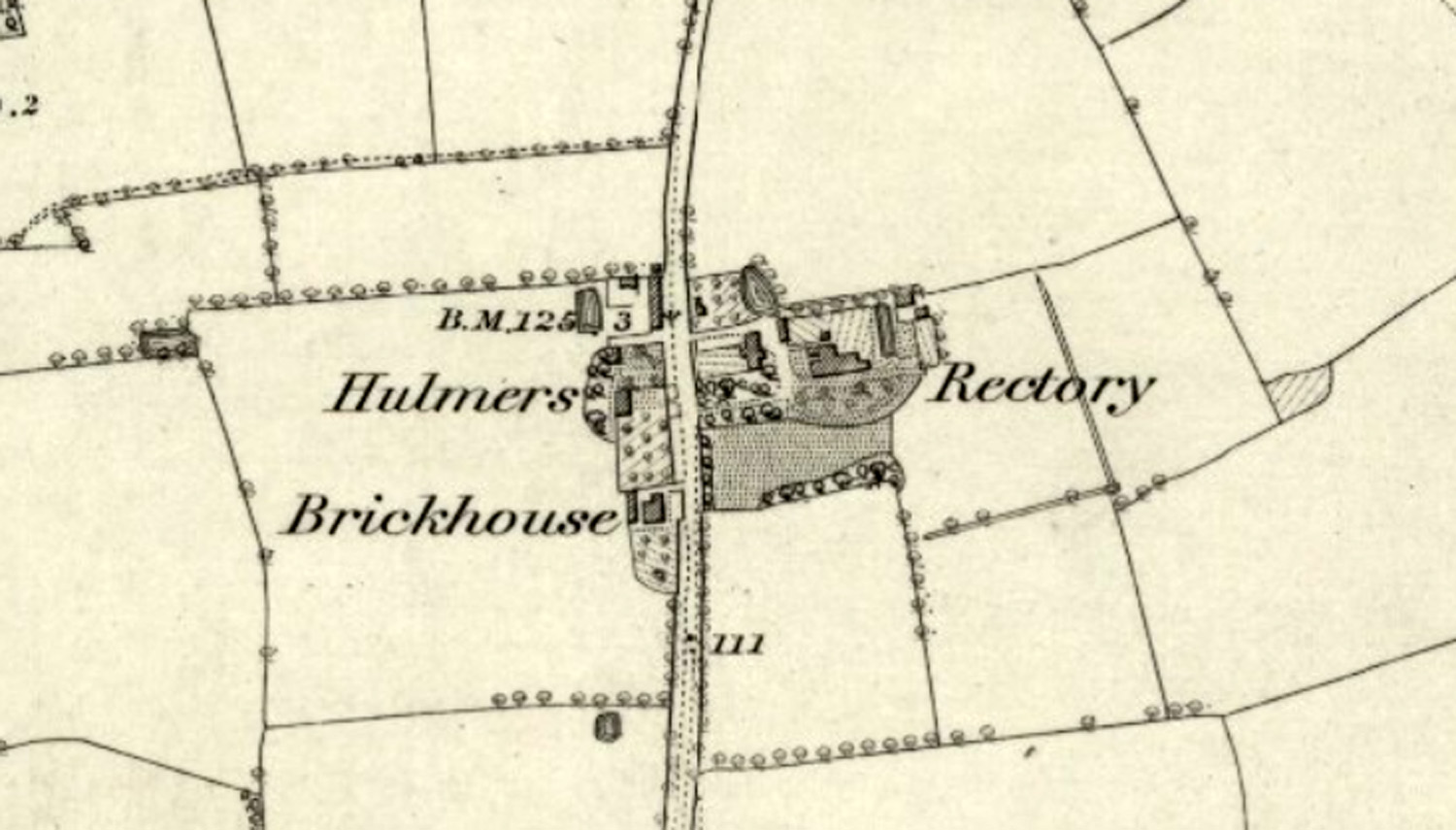
Map Hulmers and Brick House 1866

The 1851 and 1861 censuses show that the house was the residence of the curate of the nearby church. The Rev. Alexander Durdin and his wife Lydia were there in 1851, and the Rev. Josiah Descarrieres Ballance and his wife Margaret were there in 1861. The house continued to be a rented to different tenants until 1898, when it was bought by Harriett Tiddeman, a recent widow who moved there with her five unmarried daughters Rosamund, Alice, Elfrieda, Lilian and Norah., referred to as “the misses Tiddeman” and were frequently mentioned in the newspapers as being involved with theatrical productions in the village. They were also involved in cottage gardening and won prizes at the horticultural shows.

Harriett Tiddeman (1830–1914) was born Harriett Spooner and was the daughter of James Spooner a surveyor and engineer who was largely responsible for the building of the Ffestiniog Railway. In 1858 she married the Reverend Edmund Spenser Tiddeman (1832–1898). The couple had eleven children: three sons and eight daughters. Edmund died in 1898 and Harriett bought Brick House (now the Kilns Hotel). She died in 1914 and her daughters continued to live at the house for the next sixty years. The youngest daughter Norah died in 1972 at the age of 98. She was recorded as living at Brick House in the electoral roll of 1965, but moved shortly after that date.
