= Warley Barracks =

Military building in Essex, England

- Warley, Essex
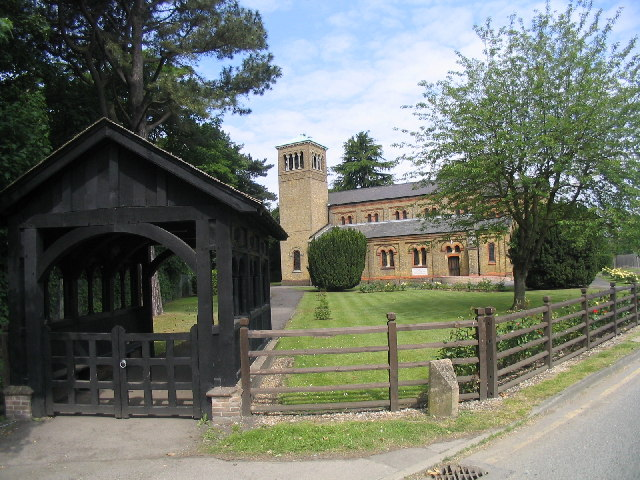
- The Essex Regiment Chapel

Site information
- Type: Barracks
- Owner: Ministry of Defence
- Operator: British Army

Location
- Location within Essex
- Coordinates: 51°35′57″N 00°17′52″E

Site history
- Built: 1804–1805
- Built for: War Office
- In use: 1805-1958

Garrison information
- Occupants: The Essex Regiment

Warley Barracks was a military installation at Warley near Brentwood in Essex.

== History ==
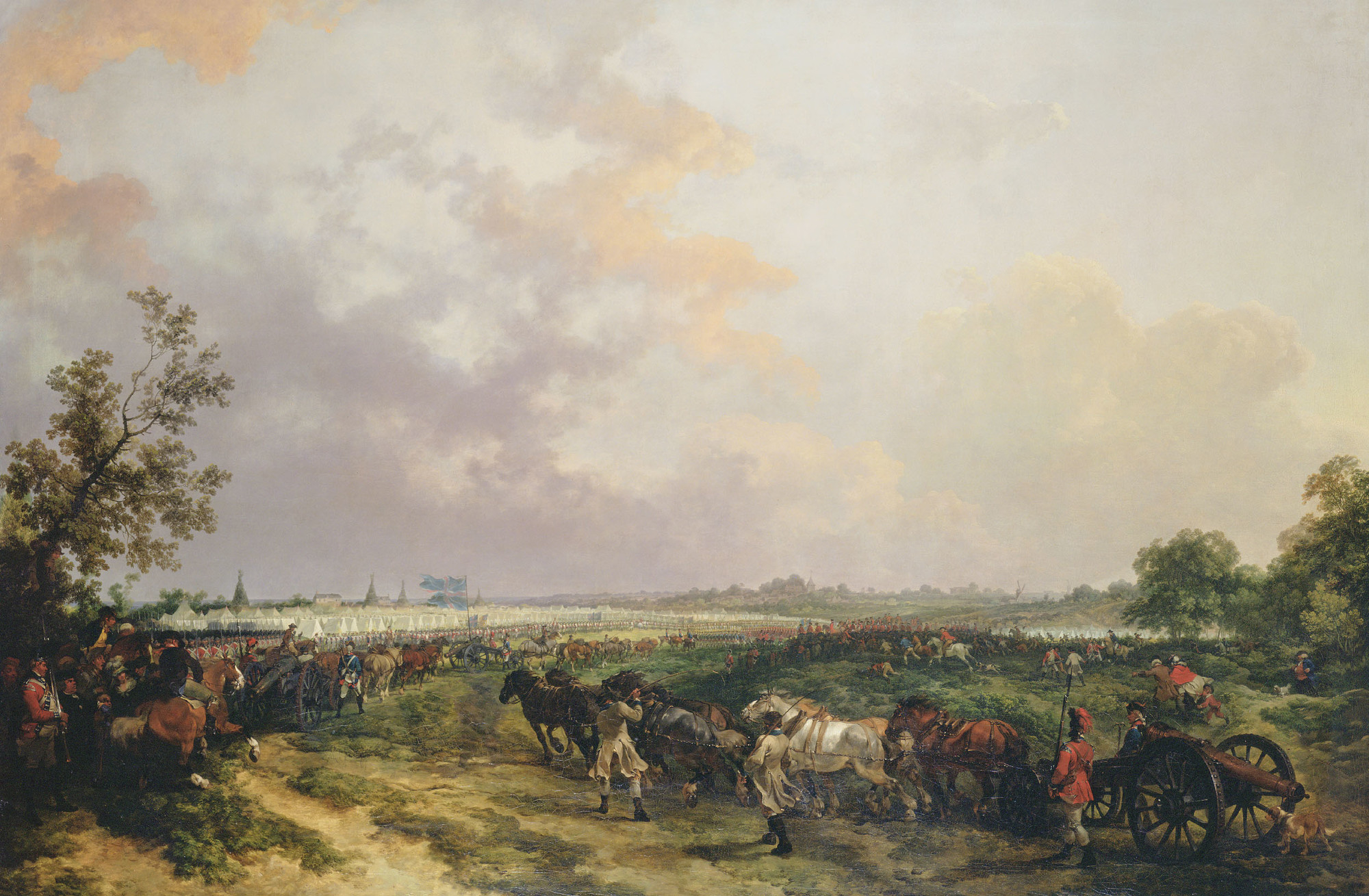
Warley Camp by Philip James de Loutherbourg, 1780. It depicts the 1778 encampment at Warley during the American War of Independence.

The local common was used as a military camp in 1742, with thousands of troops camped there during the summer months. It was an ideal base, as it was less than a day's march to Tilbury, where the troops would leave for foreign service. In the 1778 encampment, King George III came to inspect the troops, and Dr Samuel Johnson stayed for five days. Warley Barracks was made permanent in 1804, with space for 2,000 cavalry. 116 acres (0.47 km^{2}) of land were bought and used for two troops of horse artillery – 222 horses, with 306 soldiers of varying ranks and ten officers – a hospital, and half a battalion of the Rifle Brigade.

In 1842 the East India Company's barracks at Chatham became inadequate, and they purchased the land to move their troops in. Accommodation was created for 785 recruits and 20 sergeants with new buildings for the officers. Married family housing was also provided, and a chapel. In 1856 further building work was carried out, and a total of 1,120 men were housed there every year. After training they were deployed to India. The area and men were absorbed into the British Army after the Indian Mutiny in 1857, and in 1861 the barracks was bought by the War Office. The barracks became the depot of the Brigade of Guards in the 1860s.

In 1873 a system of recruiting areas based on counties was instituted under the Cardwell Reforms and the barracks became the depot for the 44th (East Essex) Regiment of Foot and the 56th (West Essex) Regiment of Foot. Following the Childers Reforms, the 44th and 56th regiments amalgamated to form the Essex Regiment with its depot in the barracks in 1881.

The regiment saw active service in the Second Boer War and both World Wars. Following the amalgamation of the regiment with the Bedfordshire and Hertfordshire Regiment to form the 3rd East Anglian Regiment in 1958 the site was sold to the Ford Motor Company. The Essex Regiment Chapel is located in Eagle Way. The chapel was built in 1857 and is a Grade II listed building. It was originally built for the East India Company, but with the establishment of the Essex Regiment Depot at Warley, the chapel became the regiment's "home" church. The chapel's interior contains displays of regimental history, memorials, heraldry and regimental colours. The chapel is open by appointment, and on regimental heritage days.

The chapel is nearby to the Warley (Brentwood) Army Reserve drill hall, which is the headquarters of 124 (Essex) Transport Squadron, part of 151 Regiment RLC.

The site of the old regimental depot and barracks became the headquarters of the Ford Motor Company, a housing estate and a Depot for Brentwood District (now Borough) Council. With the departure of the Ford Motor Company in 2019, the majority of the remaining site was developed for housing. The chapel, the officers' mess (now Marillac Nursing Home) and one of the regimental gyms (Keys Hall) remain.
