= CM postcode area =

Postcode area within the United Kingdom

Chelmsford
- Postcode area
- Coordinates: 51.754°N 0.399°E
- Country: United Kingdom
- Postcode area: CM
- Postcode area name: Chelmsford
- Post towns: 16
- Postcode districts: 28
- Postcode sectors: 103
- Postcodes (live): 17,864
- Postcodes (total): 27,233
- Statistics as at May 2020

The CM postcode area, also known as the Chelmsford postcode area, is a group of 25 postcode districts in England, within 16 post towns. These cover central Essex (including Chelmsford, Harlow, Brentwood, Billericay, Braintree, Burnham-on-Crouch, Dunmow, Epping, Ingatestone, Maldon, Ongar, Southminster, Stansted and Witham), plus a small part of east Hertfordshire (including Bishop's Stortford and Sawbridgeworth) and a very small part of the London Borough of Havering.

The southern part of the CM7 district for Braintree was recoded to CM77 in 2002.

== Coverage ==
The Stansted post town (CM24) is entirely surrounded by the Bishop's Stortford post town (CM22 and CM23). The approximate coverage of the postcode districts:

Postcode district	Post town	Coverage	Local authority area(s)
CM0	SOUTHMINSTER	Southminster, Bradwell, Tillingham, Asheldham, Dengie	Maldon
CM0	BURNHAM-ON-CROUCH	Burnham-on-Crouch, Tillingham	Maldon
CM1	CHELMSFORD	Chelmsford, Writtle	Chelmsford, Uttlesford
CM2	CHELMSFORD	Chelmsford	Chelmsford
CM3	CHELMSFORD	Hatfield Peverel, South Woodham Ferrers, North Fambridge, Cold Norton, Boreham, Maylandsea	Chelmsford, Maldon, Braintree, Uttlesford
CM4	INGATESTONE	Blackmore, Fryerning, Ingatestone, Margaretting, Stock	Brentwood, Chelmsford, Epping Forest
CM5	ONGAR	Chipping Ongar, High Ongar, Bobbingworth, Moreton, The Lavers, The Rodings	Epping Forest, Chelmsford
CM6	DUNMOW	Great Dunmow, Felsted, Thaxted	Uttlesford, Chelmsford
CM7	BRAINTREE	Braintree, Finchingfield, Great Bardfield	Braintree, Uttlesford
CM8	WITHAM	Witham	Braintree, Maldon
CM9	MALDON	Maldon, Tollesbury, Tolleshunt D'Arcy, Tolleshunt Knights	Maldon, Colchester, Chelmsford
CM11	BILLERICAY	Billericay (East), Great Burstead	Basildon, Chelmsford
CM12	BILLERICAY	Billericay (West), Little Burstead	Basildon, Brentwood
CM13	BRENTWOOD	Brentwood, East Horndon, Great Warley, Herongate, Hutton, Ingrave, Little Warley, West Horndon	Brentwood, Basildon, Havering
CM14	BRENTWOOD	Brentwood, Warley	Brentwood, Havering
CM15	BRENTWOOD	Brentwood, Doddinghurst, Kelvedon Hatch, Mountnessing, Shenfield, Stondon Massey, Pilgrims Hatch	Brentwood
CM16	EPPING	Epping, Theydon Bois, North Weald	Epping Forest
CM17	HARLOW	Harlow, Old Harlow, Matching, Matching Tye, Matching Green, Church Langley	Harlow, Epping Forest, Uttlesford
CM18	HARLOW	Harlow	Harlow, Epping Forest
CM19	HARLOW	Harlow, Roydon	Harlow, Epping Forest
CM20	HARLOW	Harlow, Gilston	Harlow, East Hertfordshire
CM21	SAWBRIDGEWORTH	Sawbridgeworth	East Hertfordshire, Epping Forest
CM22	BISHOP'S STORTFORD	Bishop's Stortford, Sheering	Uttlesford, East Hertfordshire, Epping Forest
CM23	BISHOP'S STORTFORD	Bishop's Stortford, Thorley, Manuden	East Hertfordshire, Uttlesford
CM24	STANSTED	Stansted Mountfitchet, Stansted Airport	Uttlesford
CM77	BRAINTREE	Braintree, Great Notley, Rayne	Braintree, Uttlesford, Chelmsford
CM92	CHELMSFORD	Sandringham House	non-geographic
CM98	CHELMSFORD	Jobcentre Plus	non-geographic
CM99	CHELMSFORD	PO Box Users	non-geographic

== Map ==
CM postcode area map, showing postcode districts in red and post towns in grey text, with links to nearby CB, CO, E, EN, IG, RM, SG and SS postcode areas.

== See also ==
- List of postcode areas in the United Kingdom
- Postcode Address File
