= Great Warley =

Village in Essex, England

Coordinates: 51.590°N 0.305°E

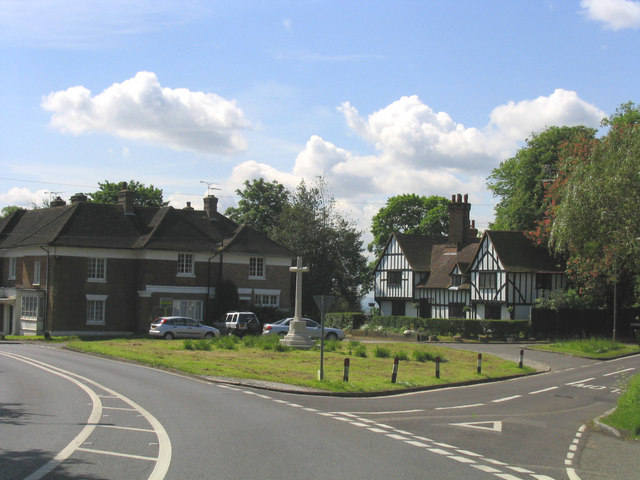
- Great Warley Village Green

- Location within Essex
- OS grid reference: TQ584907
- District: Brentwood
- Shire county: Essex
- Region: East
- Country: England
- Sovereign state: United Kingdom
- Post town: BRENTWOOD
- Postcode district: CM13
- Dialling code: 01277
- Police: Essex
- Fire: Essex
- Ambulance: East of England
- UK Parliament: Brentwood and Ongar

Great Warley is a village in the Borough of Brentwood in Essex, England. It is located 2 miles (3 km) south-west of the centre of Brentwood. It is situated to the far south-west of the county, on the B186 road near to the Greater London boundary and the M25 London Orbital Motorway. Great Warley was formerly a civil parish.

== History ==
The meaning of the name Warley is uncertain. The -ley element means a glade or clearing in a wood. The first element may indicate a weir, or may come from waer, a Saxon term for a treaty.

The Domesday Book of 1086 lists three estates or manors at a vill called Wareleia in the Hundred of Chafford in Essex.

Land held by	Households	Land and resources	Livestock	Valuation	Owners
Bishop of St. Paul of London	5 villagers. 2 smallholders. 2 slaves.	Ploughland: 2 lord's plough teams. 3 men's plough teams. Other resources: Pasture 100 sheep. Woodland 700 pigs.	-	Annual value to lord: 7 pounds in 1086; 6 pounds when acquired by the 1086 owner; 6 pounds in 1066.	Tenant-in-chief in 1086: London (St Paul), bishop of. Lords in 1086: Humphrey; Tezelin the priest. Lord in 1066: (Earl) Gyrth.
Abbey of St Mary, Barking	Households: 9 villagers. 10 smallholders. 5 slaves.	Ploughland: 2 lord's plough teams. 6 men's plough teams. Other resources: Pasture 100 sheep. Woodland 200 pigs.	Livestock in 1086: 8 cattle. 11 pigs. 150 sheep. 1 beehive.	Annual value to lord: 7 pounds in 1086; 7 pounds when acquired by the 1086 owner; 7 pounds in 1066.	Tenant-in-chief in 1086: Barking (St Mary), abbey of. Lord in 1086: Barking (St Mary), abbey of. Lord in 1066: Barking (St Mary), abbey of.
Land of Swein of Essex	Households: 3 villagers. 8 smallholders. 1 slave.	Ploughland: 2 lord's plough teams. 2.5 men's plough teams. Other resources: Meadow 3 acres. Woodland 150 pigs.	Livestock in 1066: 3 cobs. 7 cattle. 17 pigs.	Annual value to lord: 5 pounds in 1086; 4 pounds when acquired by the 1086 owner; 4 pounds in 1066.	Tenant-in-chief in 1086: Swein of Essex. Lord in 1086: Swein of Essex. Lord in 1066: Godric.

The Domesday Book itself does not otherwise distinguish between the names of the three Warley manors. The manor owned by Barking Abbey became known as Warley Abbess. The manor owned in 1086 by Swein later became known as Warley Franks, after being owned by two men called Frank in the 13th century. The manor owned by the Bishop of London became known as Little Warley.

The Warley area became the two parishes of Little Warley, covering that manor, and Great Warley, covering the two manors of Warley Abbess and Warley Franks. The parish of Great Warley was also sometimes called Warley Magna, Warley Wallet, or West Warley.

Great Warley's original parish church, dedicated to St Mary, stood towards the southern end of the parish, south of the modern A127 road. The church immediately adjoined Great Warley Hall, the manor house of Warley Abbess. The first recorded rector was John le Norreis in 1247. The ancient parish of Great Warley was seven miles north to south but only one mile across at its widest part, and was separated from Little Warley in the east by a stream that passes through Bulphan Fen on its way to the Thames.

Great Warley Common at one time ran from the village and connected with the outskirts of Brentwood, as shown by Chapman and André's 1777 Map of Essex. The common, along with Little Warley Common, were owned by George Winn, who started selling off the land for development, including 116 acres for Warley Barracks and another 172 acres for residential development. In 1855, the new ecclesiastical parish of Christ Church was set up, covering northern parts of Great Warley, along with parts of South Weald and Shenfield civil parishes to serve the new residents. The old church at St Mary's had been reported as totally inadequate for the growing population in 1851, with the rector's sister-in-law, Sarah Clay, donating £1,000 to build the new church.

By 1876, 1,416 people lived in the parish, of which 1,004 were in the new church parish of Christ Church. This area was a suburb of Brentwood, which became known just as Warley to distinguish it from the villages of Great Warley and Little Warley, which two civil parishes it straddled.

In 1858, the chancel at St Mary's collapsed, so remodelling work commenced under the guidance of Samuel Sanders Teulon which was completed in 1860. However, with the village centre moving further away from the church, it fell into disrepair, and a new "interim" church was built from wood in the grounds of "Fairfields", home of Rector Bailey. The first service was in 1892 attended by 140 parishioners, although the old church was continued to be used for funerals.

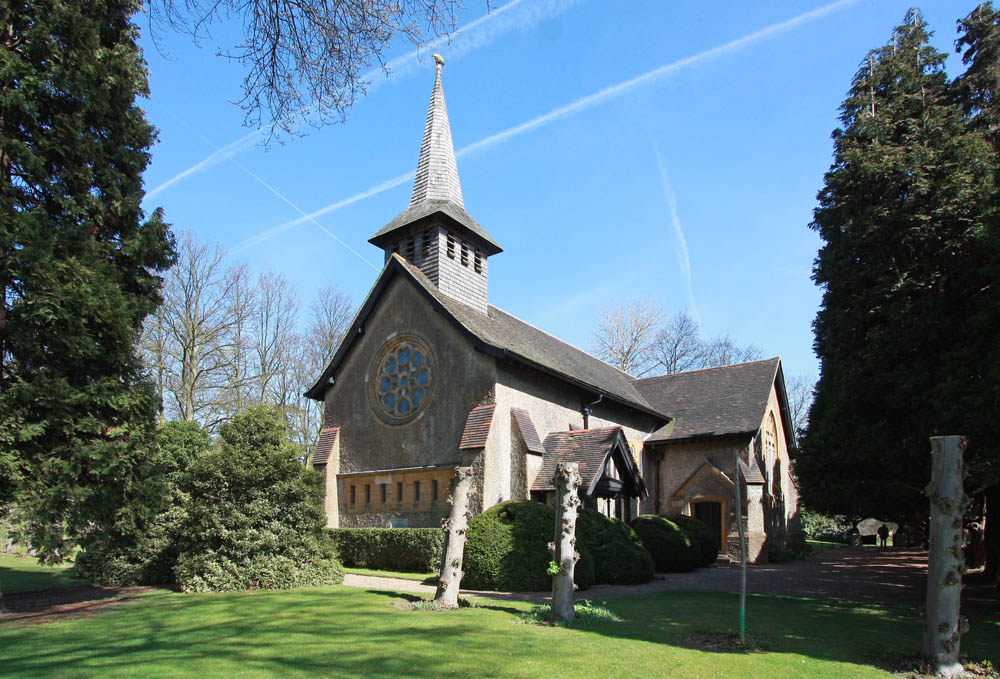
St Mary's Church: The new church, completed in 1904

In 1904, a replacement St Mary's Church opened on a new site closer to the modern centre of the village, after a local resident Eveline Heseltine donated the site and £5,000 towards the cost of the new building.

=== Administrative history ===
Great Warley was an ancient parish in the Hundred of Chafford. From 1836, the parish was included in the Romford Poor Law Union, a group of parishes which collectively administered their responsibilities under the poor laws. From 1872, poor law unions formed the basis for rural sanitary districts which took on public health and local government functions for rural areas, administered by the existing board of guardians of the poor law union.

The Local Government Act 1894 converted rural sanitary districts into rural districts with elected councils and also established elected parish councils. Great Warley was therefore given a parish council and included in the Romford Rural District. At this time, the parish covered an area of 2,793 acres (11.30 km^{2}). In 1901 it had a population of 1,900.

In 1934, a County Review Order abolished the Romford Rural District and split the civil parish of Great Warley. The northern 910 acres (368 ha), covering the village itself, the Warley suburb of Brentwood, and the surrounding more wooded landscape on higher ground, was transferred to the parish and urban district of Brentwood. The remainder, covering the more low-lying area of open farmland including the area around Great Warley Hall and the site of the original parish church, was transferred to Hornchurch Urban District. The part transferred to Hornchurch continued to form a civil parish called Great Warley despite no longer including the village itself, but after 1934 it was classed as an urban parish and so was ineligible to have a parish council. The civil parish of Great Warley was abolished in 1965 when Hornchurch Urban District was abolished and its area became part of the new London Borough of Havering in Greater London.

In 1993, the boundary between Brentwood and Havering was locally realigned to the M25 motorway in the west and the London, Tilbury and Southend line in the south by the Essex and Greater London (County and London Borough Boundaries) (No.2) Order 1993. This transferred back to Essex most of the pre-1934 Great Warley civil parish that had been in Greater London.

== Geology ==
The village sits on London Clay with an outcropping of Bagshot sands.

== Governance ==
=== Parliamentary constituency ===
Great Warley comes under the parliamentary constituency of Brentwood and Ongar, which the current MP Alex Burghart has held since 2017.

=== Local authorities ===
Great Warley sits within the non-metropolitan county of Essex, governed by Essex County Council, and the non-Metropolitan Borough of Brentwood, which is governed by Brentwood Borough Council. The village is within the Warley ward.

== Buildings, structures and attractions ==
The main part of Great Warley village is covered by a conservation area, which was first designated in 1975. Historic England have thirty two listed buildings in Great Warley.

Consecrated in 1904, the Grade I listed parish church, St Mary the Virgin is noted for its Art Nouveau interior, and replaced the original St. Mary's church that was eventually taken down in 1923. A little further to the south is The Kilns Hotel in the building locally known as The Brick House which dates back to the 16th Century and is Grade II listed.

In 2024, work was started on Hole Farm Community Woodland, a 100 acre woodland and visitor centre developed by National Highways and Forestry England due to open in 2025.

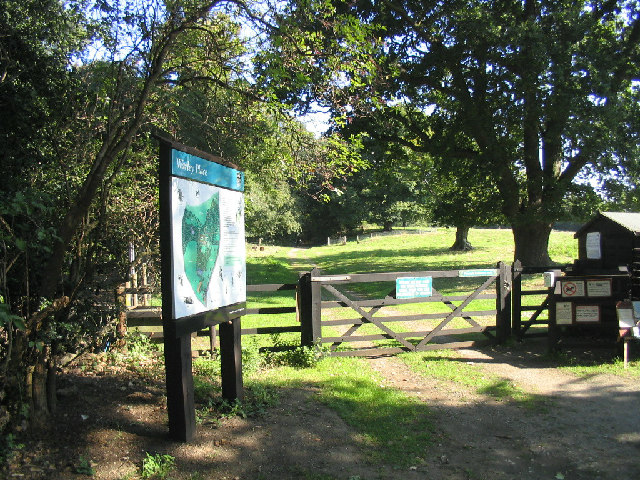
Entrance to Warley Place Nature Reserve

Warley Place is a 10.1-hectare (25-acre) nature reserve and is managed by the Essex Wildlife Trust. In the late nineteenth and early twentieth centuries this site was the home and garden of the leading horticulturalist, Ellen Willmott, described by Gertrude Jekyll as 'the greatest living gardener', who planted many plants from all over the world, some of which still survive. The site remained derelict following Willmott's death, after a development for the site failed, until the site was leased to the Essex Wildlife Trust in 1977, whoch uncovered the structure of the garden. The site has been Grade II listed since 1987.

=== Listed buildings and structures ===
Listing name	Image	List entry number	Grade	Date first listed	National Grid reference	Reference
Apple Tree Cottage		1293155	II	20 Feb 1976	TQ 58554 91258	
Blake House		1197259	II	21 Oct 1958	TQ 58318 90683	
Boyles Court		1206439	II	21 Oct 1958	TQ 57788 91558	
Boyles Court Cottages - 2 & 3		1197204	II	20 Feb 1976	TQ 58252 91178	
Boyles Court Cottages - 4 & 5		1280225	II	20 Feb 1976	TQ 58252 91178	
Boyles Court Cottages - 6 & 7		1197205	II	20 Feb 1976	TQ 58252 91178	
Barn at Boyles Court Farm		1197206	II	5 September 1988	TQ 57848 91443	
Stables at Boyles Court Farm		1206447	II	9 Dec 1994	TQ 57861 91412	
Blenheim House, Headquarters of the Royal Anglian Regiment		1205940	II	20 Feb 1976	TQ 59248 91507	
Chapel of the Royal Anglian Regiment and Essex Regiment		1197197	II	20 Feb 1976	TQ 59240 91416	
Brick House Hotel		1263167	II	7 Jan 1955	TQ 59457 88864	
Church of St. Mary the Virgin		1197210	I	20 Feb 1976	TQ 58888 89990	
Lych Gate at the church of St. Mary the Virgin		1206677	II*	16 March 1993	TQ 58922 89995	
Fairsteads		1297229	II	20 Feb 1976	TQ 58862 90177	
Great Ropers		1206489	II*	21 Oct 1958	TQ 58597 91517	
Game Larder at Great Ropers		1280198	II	21 Oct 1958	TQ 58597 91534	
Hill Cottage		1293162	II	13 Nov 1989	TQ 58766 91518	
Hole Farmhouse		1250606	II	14 Sep 1979	TQ 58564 89798	
Hulmers		1250605	II	7 January 1955	TQ 59435 88917	
Oak Beam Cottage		1206628	II	21 Oct 1958	TQ 58351 90648	
Post Office	1293148	1293148	II	21 Oct 1958	TQ 58283 90657	
K6 Telephone Kiosk adjacent to the Post Office		1297214	II	9 Jan 1989	TQ 58289 90652	
Stony Hills Farm		1297215	II	9 Dec 1994	TQ 57708 90524	
The Red House		1197260	II	21 Oct 1958	TQ 58307 90680	
The Squirrels		1208575	II	20 Feb 1976	TQ 58096 90318	
Thatchers Arms		1208559	II	21 Oct 1958	TQ 58324 90718	
Thatched Cottage		1205387	II	20 Feb 1976	TQ 57970 90392	
Two Door Cottage		1197209	II*	21 Oct 1958	TQ 58367 90668	
Wallets		1197211	II	20 Feb 1976	TQ 58323 90639	
Warley Elms		1297230	II	20 Feb 1976	TQ 58799 90098	
Warley Place		1000746	II	1 Jul 1987	TQ 58371 90979	
South Lodge to Warley Place		1197261	II	21 Oct 1958	TQ 58329 90741	

== Sports ==
Great Warley has a cricket field, the De Rougemont Cricket Ground, formerly the Great and Little Warley Cricket ground, and a golf course, Warley Park.

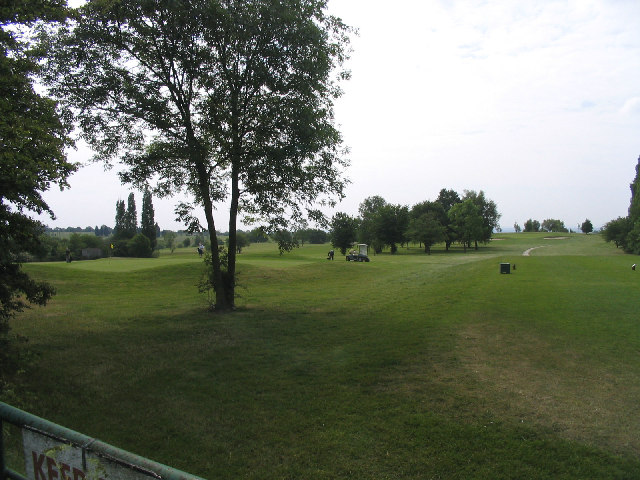
Warley Park Golf Course, Great Warley

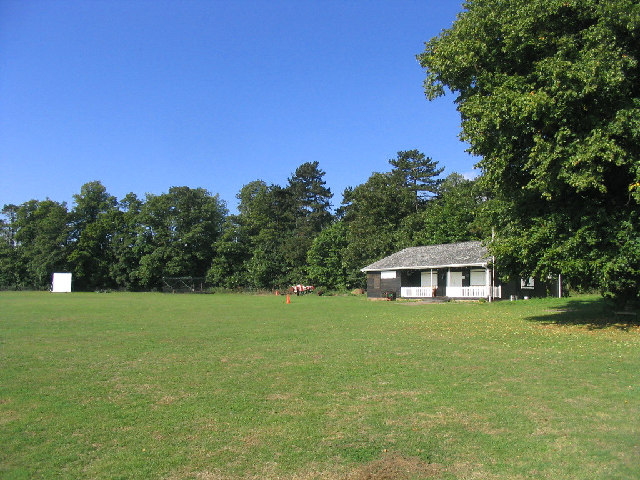
Cricket Clubhouse at De Rougemont Cricket Ground, Great Warley

== Notable people ==
•Ellen Willmott (1858 – 1934), renowned horticulturalist and recipient of the first Victoria Medal of Honour.
