= Little Warley =

Village in Essex, England

Coordinates: 51.590°N 0.319°E

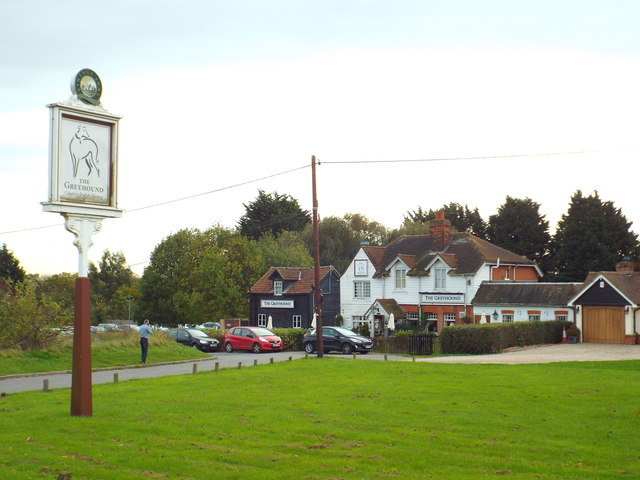
- The Greyhound public house

- Location within Essex
- OS grid reference: TL640003
- District: Brentwood
- Shire county: Essex
- Region: East
- Country: England
- Sovereign state: United Kingdom
- Post town: BRENTWOOD
- Postcode district: CM13
- Dialling code: 01277
- Police: Essex
- Fire: Essex
- Ambulance: East of England
- UK Parliament: Brentwood and Ongar

Little Warley is a village in the Borough of Brentwood in Essex, England. It is situated south-west of Thorndon Country Park and 2 miles (3 km) south of the centre of Brentwood. It is a dispersed settlement in two main parts, being around Little Warley Common to the north, and along Little Warley Hall Lane to the south. The southern part of the village is now bisected by the A127 road.

Little Warley was formerly a civil parish, which was abolished in 1934 when most of its area, including the village, was absorbed into Brentwood. Since 2003 the part of Little Warley village south of the A127 has formed part of the civil parish of West Horndon.

== History ==
The meaning of the name Warley is uncertain. The -ley element means a glade or clearing in a wood. The first element may indicate a weir, or may come from waer, a Saxon term for a treaty.

The Domesday Book of 1086 lists three estates or manors at a vill called Wareleia in the Hundred of Chafford in Essex. The Domesday Book itself does not otherwise distinguish between the names of the three Warley manors, but they are later recorded as Little Warley, Warley Franks and Warley Abbess, with Little Warley being the manor owned by the Bishop of London in the Domesday Book.

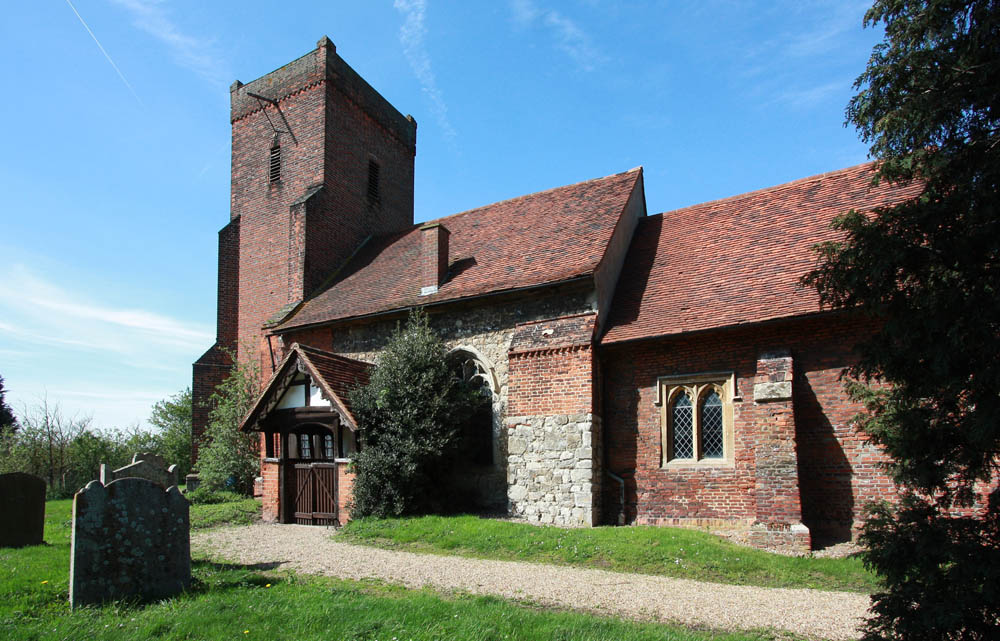
St. Peter's Church

The Warley area subsequently became the two parishes of Little Warley, corresponding to that manor, and Great Warley, covering the other two Warley manors. Little Warley's parish church, dedicated to St. Peter, dates back to the 15th century. On display inside the church is a list of rectors of Little Warley since 1327. The church stands immediately to the north of the manor house of Little Warley Hall, where the oldest parts of the current building date from the early 16th century.

By the 19th century, the main part of the village had come to be along Magpie Lane, which forms the southern edge of Little Warley Common, 1 mile (1.6 km) north of the church and the manor house. The village pub, the Greyhound, is on Magpie Lane overlooking the common and dates back to the early 16th century. Close to the Greyhound is the Little Warley and Childerditch Village Hall, built in the early 20th century to serve both Little Warley and the neighbouring parish of Childerditch.

Little Warley Common was historically an open heath. Until the late 19th century it was kept open by being grazed by the villagers' livestock. As the practice of grazing livestock on the common died out, much of the common reverted to woodland. Today only the southern part remains unwooded. The common is now managed by Brentwood Borough Council.

The A127 from London to Southend-on-Sea was built in the early 1920s through Little Warley, passing just north of St Peter's Church. The road opened in 1924.

When elected parish and district councils were established in 1894, the parish of Little Warley was included in the Billericay Rural District. In 1934 a County Review Order abolished the rural district and the civil parish of Little Warley. The main part of the parish, including both the area around Little Warley Common and the area around St Peter's Church and Little Warley Hall, was added to the urban district of Brentwood. A small part of the parish which lay south of the London, Tilbury and Southend Railway was temporarily added to the new Billericay Urban District; four years later in 1938 that area south of the railway was transferred instead to Thurrock Urban District. At the 1931 census (the last before the abolition of the civil parish), Little Warley had a population of 395.

Little Warley has been administered as part of Brentwood since 1934. The area became unparished when the urban district was enlarged to become the modern Brentwood district in 1974. A new civil parish called West Horndon was created in 2003 from part of the unparished area, providing an additional tier of local government for that area. The new parish of West Horndon includes the part of Little Warley village which lies south of the A127, including the area around St Peter's Church and Little Warley Hall. The remainder of Little Warley north of the A127 remains unparished.

Although abolished as a civil parish, Little Warley remains an ecclesiastical parish in the Church of England. It now forms a united benefice with East and West Horndon and Childerditch.

The 2001 United Kingdom foot-and-mouth outbreak was first detected at an abattoir in Little Warley.

== Notable people ==
- Gertrude Tyrrell, Catholic noblewoman
