= West Horndon railway station =

Railway station in Essex, England

West Horndon
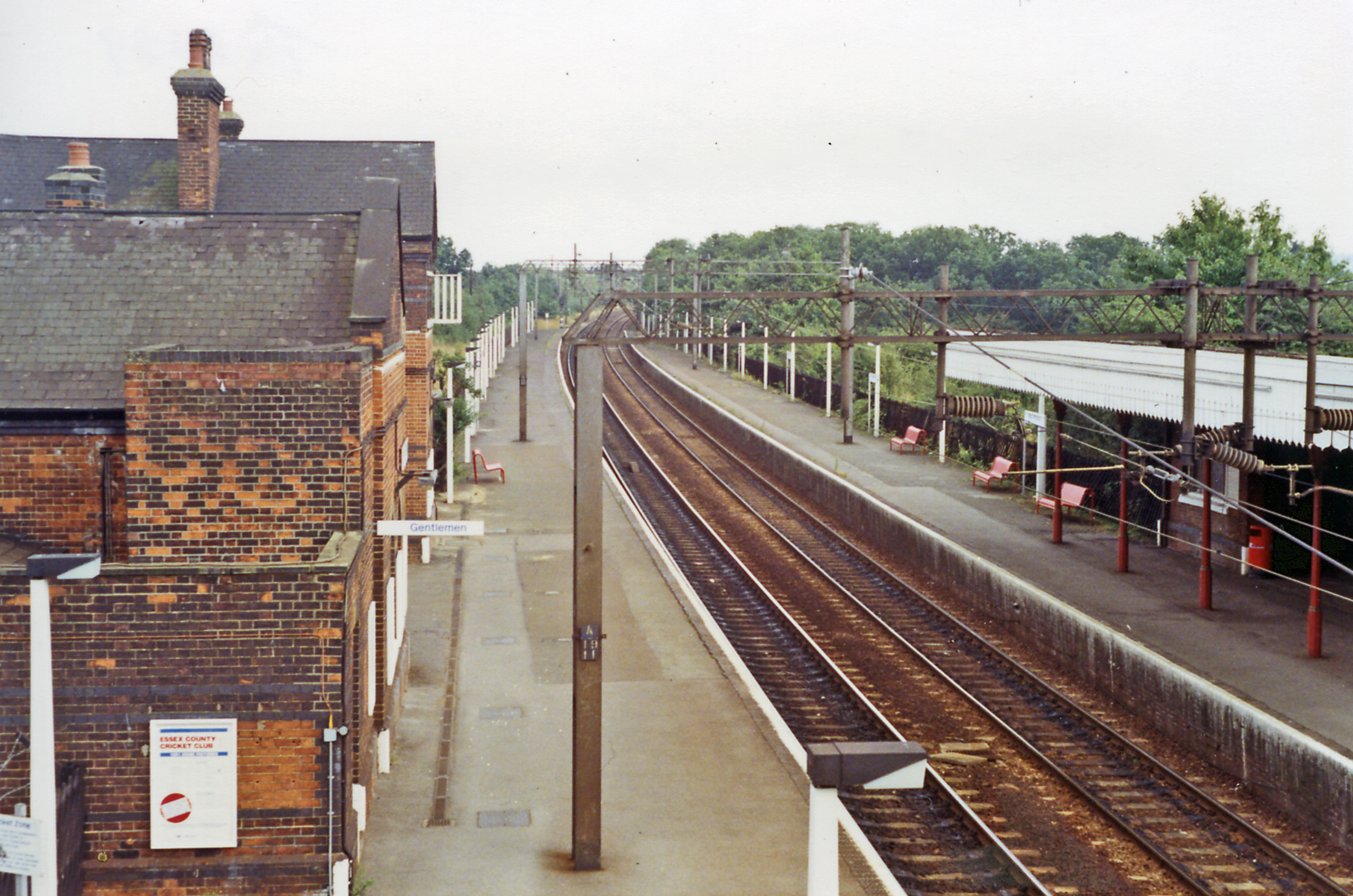
- West Horndon railway station in 1991

General information
- Location: West Horndon, Borough of Brentwood; England
- Coordinates: 51.5679°N 0.3406°E
- Grid reference: TQ623880
- Owner: Network Rail
- Manager: c2c
- Platforms: 2

Other information
- Station code: WHR
- Classification: DfT category E

History
- Original company: London, Tilbury and Southend Railway
- Pre-grouping: Midland Railway
- Post-grouping: London, Midland and Scottish Railway

Key dates
- 1 May 1886: Opened as East Horndon
- 1 May 1949: Renamed West Horndon

Passengers
- 2020/21: ▼0.112 million
- 2021/22: ▲0.230 million
- 2022/23: ▲0.288 million
- 2023/24: ▲0.304 million
- 2024/25: ▲0.412 million
Location
Notes
- Passenger statistics from the Office of Rail and Road

West Horndon is a railway station on the London, Tilbury and Southend line, serving the village of West Horndon situated on the boundary of the boroughs of Brentwood and Thurrock, Essex. It is 19 miles 15 chains (30.9 km) down the main line from London Fenchurch Street and is situated between Upminster and Laindon. Its three-letter station code is WHR.

== History ==
The London Tilbury and Southend Railway Act 1882 required the station called East Horndon to be opened in what was then a remote rural location.

The station was opened on 1 July 1886 by the London Tilbury and Southend Railway on a new direct route from Barking to Pitsea, and the original station structure survives. The station was located in the parish of West Horndon and on the boundary with Childerditch to the west. The opening of the station stimulated the building of factories in Childerditch.

The station was renamed West Horndon in 1949.

There were formerly three east-facing sidings to the north and east of the station, these closed in September 1964. An east-facing sidings to the north and west of the station connected to the premises of Brown and Tawse Limited.

On privatisation in 1994, infrastructure ownership passed to Railtrack and Prism Rail took over operations of the franchise, marketing the route as LTS Rail. Prism Rail were bought out by National Express in 2000 and in 2002 the line was rebranded as c2c.

Ownership of the infrastructure passed to Network Rail in 2002.

National Express sold the operation of the franchise to Trenitalia in 2017.

The station and all trains serving it are currently operated by c2c and are operated by Class 357 and Class 720/6 EMUs.

A more detailed history of the franchises can be found on the c2c page.

Previously in the latter part of the 20th century in about 1998 the station building on the London-bound platform had been demolished. A more modern structure was erected, which provides very little shelter, unlike the original building.

During the latter part of 2008 the ticket hall, customer toilets and ticket office were refurbished. Automatic doors were provided between the street and the ticket hall, and to and from the platform.

On 20 July 2025 the C2C network was returned to the public sector by the Labour Government

== Services ==
The station and all trains serving it are currently operated by c2c.

The station's ticket office is open Monday to Saturday; due to the low patronage it is closed on Sunday and public holidays. The ticket office has one serving window and uses the TRIBUTE issuing system. The ticket hall has three automatic ticket gates.

As of the June 2024 timetable the typical Monday to Friday off-peak service is:

- 2 tph (trains per hour) westbound to London Fenchurch Street
- 2 tph eastbound to Shoeburyness

| Preceding station | National Rail | Following station |
|---|---|---|
| Upminster | c2c London, Tilbury and Southend line | Laindon |
