= Bulphan =

Village in Essex, England

Coordinates: 51.5533°N 0.3737°E

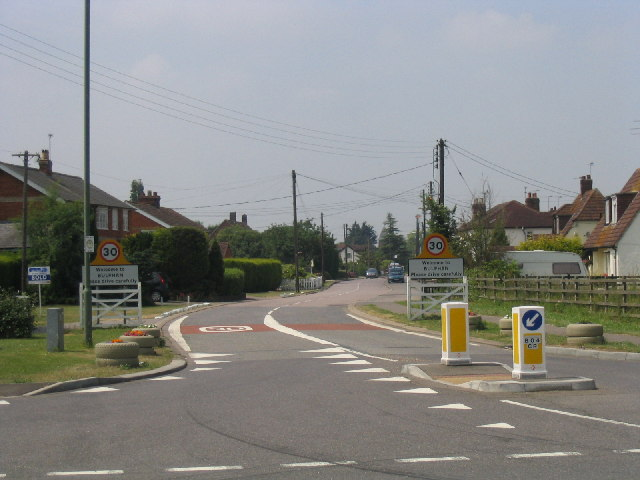
- The entrance to the village of Bulphan

- Location within Essex
- Area: 0.537 km^{2} (0.207 sq mi)
- Population: 759 (Built up area, 2021)
  - Density: 1,413/km^{2} (3,660/sq mi)
- OS grid reference: TQ645865
- Unitary authority: Thurrock
- Ceremonial county: Essex
- Region: East
- Country: England
- Sovereign state: United Kingdom
- Post town: UPMINSTER
- Postcode district: RM14
- Dialling code: 01375
- Police: Essex
- Fire: Essex
- Ambulance: East of England
- UK Parliament: Thurrock

Bulphan (Bul-ven) is a village in the borough of Thurrock in Essex, England. It lies 5 miles (8 km) east of Upminster, its post town, and 4 miles (6 km) west of the centre of Basildon. At the 2021 census the Bulphan built up area had a population of 759.

Bulphan was an ancient parish. It was abolished as a civil parish in 1936 on the creation of Thurrock Urban District, which in turn became the modern borough of Thurrock in 1974. The parish has also been merged for ecclesiastical purposes with the neighbouring parishes of Horndon-on-the-Hill and Orsett.

== History ==
The name Bulphan combines the Old English terms burh meaning a fortification and fen meaning a marsh.

In the Domesday Book of 1086, Bulphan formed a manor listed as Bulgeuen or Bulgeven in the Barstable Hundred of Essex. At that time, the manor comprised 35 households and was owned by Barking Abbey.

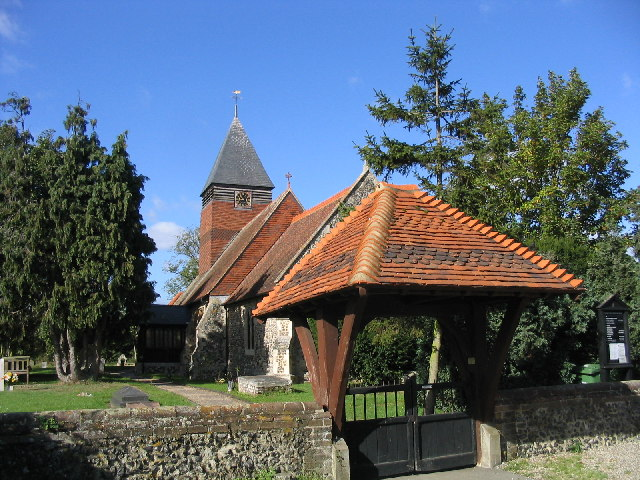
Parish church of St Mary the Virgin

No church or priest is explicitly recorded in the Domesday Book at Bulphan, but it came to be a parish. The current parish church, dedicated to St Mary, dates from the late 15th century.

When elected parish and district councils were established in 1894, Bulphan was given a parish council and included in the Orsett Rural District. The civil parish and the rural district were both abolished in 1936 when the area became Thurrock Urban District. At the 1931 census (the last before the abolition of the civil parish), Bulphan had a population of 455.

The parish of Bulphan has also been abolished for ecclesiastical purposes, merging with Horndon-on-the-Hill and Orsett to form a Church of England ecclesiastical parish called "Horndon, Orsett and Bulphan".

Bulphan's original village shop closed down in 2012. However, a new community-run shop and post office opened in early 2020, in a side extension of the village hall.

== Geography ==
Bulphan forms part of the Orsett ward of Thurrock Council, and is part of the South Basildon and East Thurrock parliamentary constituency. It is located 21 miles (34 km) east north-east of Charing Cross in London. The Upminster post town forms a long, thin protrusion eastwards over the M25 motorway and the Greater London boundary in order to include the village.

The main features of Bulphan are the Bulphan Village Hall and Park, St Mary The Virgin Church, and Bulphan Church Of England Academy Primary School. The church is a grade I listed building.

Nearby places include Laindon, North Ockendon, Orsett and West Horndon.

== Transport ==
Bulphan has one bus service: the 565 to Brentwood Station via West Horndon (6 times per day, Monday to Saturday). The nearest railway station is three miles away.

== Education ==
Primary education has been provided by the Bulphan Church of England Voluntary Controlled Primary School since 1853. Located on Fen lane, it educates around 84 pupils.

== Notable people ==
- Charles Littlehales (1871-1945), cricketer and clergyman
- Jim Davidson (1953-), comedian
- Tony Cottee (1965-), footballer and commentator
- Mick Norcross (1963-2021) reality TV performer
