= Childerditch =

Coordinates: 51.5859°N 0.3225°E

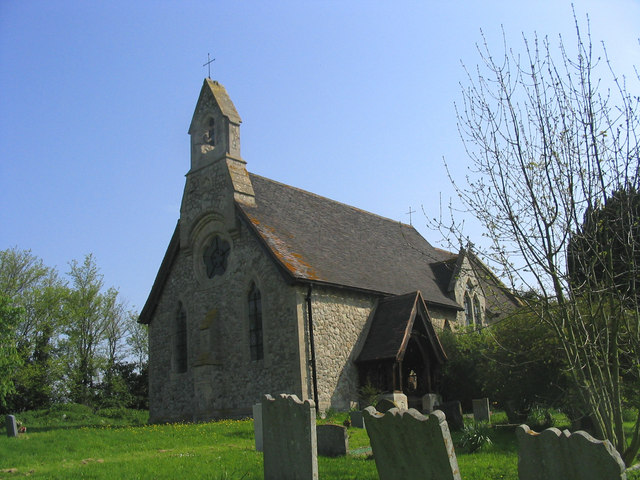
- All Saints and St Faith, Childerditch Parish Church

- Location within Essex
- OS grid reference: TQ610897
- District: Brentwood
- Shire county: Essex
- Region: East
- Country: England
- Sovereign state: United Kingdom
- Post town: Brentwood
- Postcode district: CM13
- Dialling code: 01277
- Police: Essex
- Fire: Essex
- Ambulance: East of England
- UK Parliament: Brentwood and Ongar

Childerditch is a settlement in the Brentwood borough of Essex, England. It lies 3 miles (5 km) south of the centre of Brentwood.

== History ==
At the time of the Domesday survey in 1086, the settlement was home to 25 households.

The opening of the East Horndon station on the London Tilbury and Southend Railway on the eastern boundary in 1886 stimulated the building of factories in Childerditch.

Childerditch church is a landmark on a hilltop to the north of the A127 road. The church is dedicated to All Saints and St Faith. It was constructed in 1869, to the designs of D. C. Nicholls and Fred Johnstone, replacing an earlier building.

=== Administrative history ===
Childerditch was an ancient parish in the Hundred of Chafford. When elected parish and district councils were established in 1894 it was included in the Billericay Rural District. In 1934 a County Review Order abolished the rural district and the civil parish of Childerditch. The part of Childerditch parish north of the railway was added to the urban district of Brentwood. The part of Childerditch parish south of the railway was temporarily added to the new Billericay Urban District; four years later in 1938 that area south of the railway was transferred instead to Thurrock Urban District. At the 1931 census (the last before the abolition of the civil parish), Childerditch had a population of 184.

== Sources ==
- Bettley, John; Pevsner, Nikolaus (2007). Essex. The Buildings Of England. Yale University Press. ISBN 978-0-300-11614-4.
