= Grade II* listed buildings in Basildon (district) =

There are over 20,000 Grade II* listed buildings in England. This page is a list of these buildings in the Borough of Basildon in Essex.

== List of buildings ==
Name	Location	Type	Completed (Note: The date given is the date used by Historic England as significant for the initial building or that of an important part in the structure's description.)	Date designated	Grid ref. (Note: Sometimes known as OSGB36, the grid reference is based on the British national grid reference system used by the Ordnance Survey.) Geo-coordinates	Entry number (Note: The "List Entry Number" is a unique number assigned to each listed building and scheduled monument by Historic England.)	Image
Burghstead House	Billericay, Basildon	House	18th century	4 July 1955	TQ6731294328; 51°37′22″N 0°24′56″E	1122231	Burghstead House More images
Church of St Mary Magdalene	Billericay	Church	15th century	4 July 1955	TQ6748494671; 51°37′33″N 0°25′06″E	1170075	Church of St Mary Magdalene More images
6, 8 and 10 Norsey Road	Billericay	House	c.1400	27 January 1988	TQ6758994868; 51°37′40″N 0°25′11″E	1338399	6, 8 and 10 Norsey Road
Church of All Saints	North Benfleet, Bowers Gifford and North Benfleet	Church	13th century or earlier	4 July 1955	TQ7611989997; 51°34′53″N 0°32′26″E	1170845	Church of All Saints More images
Church of St Margaret, Bowers Gifford	Bowers Gifford, Bowers Gifford and North Benfleet	Church	11th century	4 July 1955	TQ7559287252; 51°33′25″N 0°31′54″E	1338379	Church of St Margaret, Bowers Gifford More images
Church of St Mary	Little Burstead	Church	12th century origins	4 July 1955	TQ6684891546; 51°35′53″N 0°24′27″E	1170867	Church of St Mary More images
Stockwell Hall	Little Burstead	House	18th century	4 July 1955	TQ6643092313; 51°36′18″N 0°24′07″E	1122207	Upload Photo
Church of St Mary	Ramsden Bellhouse	Church	Early 15th century	4 July 1955	TQ7192094277; 51°37′16″N 0°28′55″E	1122254	Church of St Mary More images
Church of St Mary	Ramsden Crays	Redundant church/house	15th century	4 July 1955	TQ7080193358; 51°36′47″N 0°27′56″E	1122251	Church of St Mary More images
Church of All Saints	Vange	Church	12th century	4 July 1955	TQ7150586725; 51°33′12″N 0°28′21″E	1122235	Church of All Saints More images
Church of Holy Cross	Basildon	Church	Mid-15th century	24 March 1950	TQ7139289819; 51°34′52″N 0°28′20″E	1122252	Church of Holy Cross More images
Church of St Peter	Nevendon	Church	14th century	24 March 1950	TQ7343990778; 51°35′21″N 0°30′08″E	1122250	Church of St Peter More images

== See also ==
- Grade I listed buildings in Essex
- Grade II* listed buildings in Essex
