= Langdon Hills =

Area of Basildon, Essex, England

Coordinates: 51.5618°N 0.4213°E

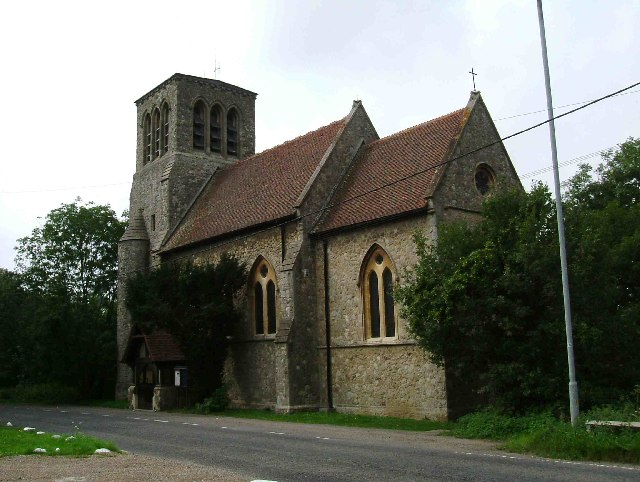
- St Mary's Church

- Location within Essex
- OS grid reference: TQ679875
- District: Basildon
- Shire county: Essex
- Region: East
- Country: England
- Sovereign state: United Kingdom
- Post town: BASILDON
- Postcode district: SS16
- Dialling code: 01268
- Police: Essex
- Fire: Essex
- Ambulance: East of England
- UK Parliament: South Basildon and East Thurrock

Langdon Hills is an area of Basildon in Essex, England. It lies on the south-west side of the town, adjoining the border between the Borough of Basildon and Thurrock.

It is located south of Laindon railway station on the London, Tilbury and Southend line. It is the location of the 400-acre (1.6 km^{2}) Langdon Hills Country Park, which is in Thurrock.

Langdon Hills was historically also known as Laindon Hills. It was part of the territory of Laindon in Saxon times, which subsequently fragmented into smaller manors and parishes, including Langdon Hills. The civil parish of Langdon Hills was abolished in 1936, when the more sparsely populated south-west of the old parish was included in the new Thurrock Urban District, and the more developed north-east part was added to the Billericay Urban District, which was renamed Basildon in 1955. Langdon Hills remains an ecclesiastical parish.

== History ==
In Saxon times, there was an extensive territory called Laindon, which covered both Laindon village and surrounding areas, including the Langdon Hills area.

By the time of the Domesday Book of 1086, the old Laindon territory had fragmented. There were two estates or manors in a vill listed as Legenduna or Leienduna. Langdon Hills was by then a separate manor, listed as Langenduna.

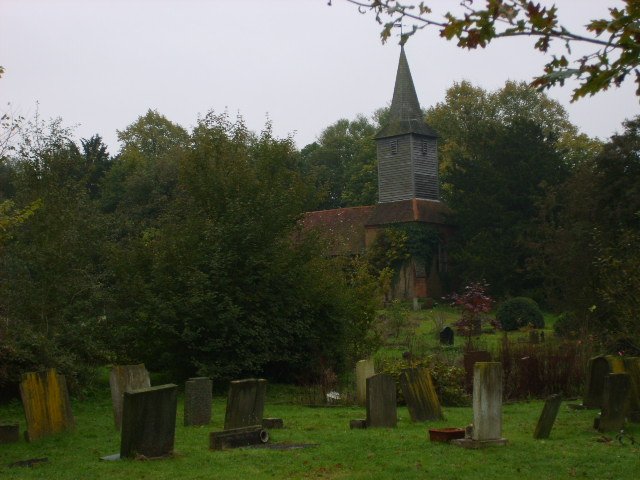
The former parish church of St Mary and All Saints, now converted to a house

Langdon Hills became a parish. A parish church, dedicated to St Mary and All Saints, was built in the early 16th century on the road now called Old Church Hill. That church was superseded by a new parish church dedicated to St Mary on High Road, built in 1876.

In 1767, Arthur Young commented on the view from Langdon Hills

"…near Horndon, on the summit of a vast hill, one of the most astonishing prospects to be beheld, breaks almost at once upon one of the dark lanes. Such a prodigious valley, everywhere painted with the finest verdure, and intersected with numberless hedges and woods, appears beneath you, that it is past description; the Thames winding thro’ it, full of ships and bounded by the hills of Kent. Nothing can exceed it…"

From the 1930s the Dunton Plotlands developed and are now commemorated by a museum.

The former plotlands around Langdon Hills were extensively redeveloped in the second half of the 20th century as part of the new town of Basildon. An additional Church of England church, dedicated to St John, was built to serve the newer parts of Langdon Hills, supplementing the 1876 parish church of St Mary.

=== Administrative history ===
The parish of Langdon Hills formed part of the Barstable Hundred of Essex. When elected parish and district councils were established in 1894, the parish was included in the Orsett Rural District. The civil parish and the rural district were both abolished in 1934. The north-east of the old parish, which had most of the population, was added to the Billericay Urban District, and the more rural south-west of the old parish was added to the new Thurrock Urban District. At the 1931 census (the last before the abolition of the civil parish), Langdon Hills had a population of 2,103.

In 1949, the Langdon Hills area was included in the area for the new town of Basildon. The Billericay Urban District was renamed Basildon in 1955. The boundary between Basildon and Thurrock was adjusted as part of the wider local government reforms in 1974, so as to place the whole area for the new town in Basildon. Parts of the pre-1936 parish of Langdon Hills remain in Thurrock, including the rural area around its former parish church of St Mary and All Saints.

Although abolished as a civil parish in 1936, Langdon Hills remains an ecclesiastical parish in the Church of England.
