= Benfleet =

Benfleet may refer to:

== Places in England ==
- Benfleet railway station, Essex
- Benfleet Urban District, a former urban district in Essex
- North Benfleet, a village in the Basildon district of Essex
- South Benfleet, a town in the borough of Castle Point, Essex

== Other uses ==
- Benfleet F.C., a football club based in Benfleet, Essex
