= Old Town Hall, Billericay =

Municipal building in Billericay, Essex, England

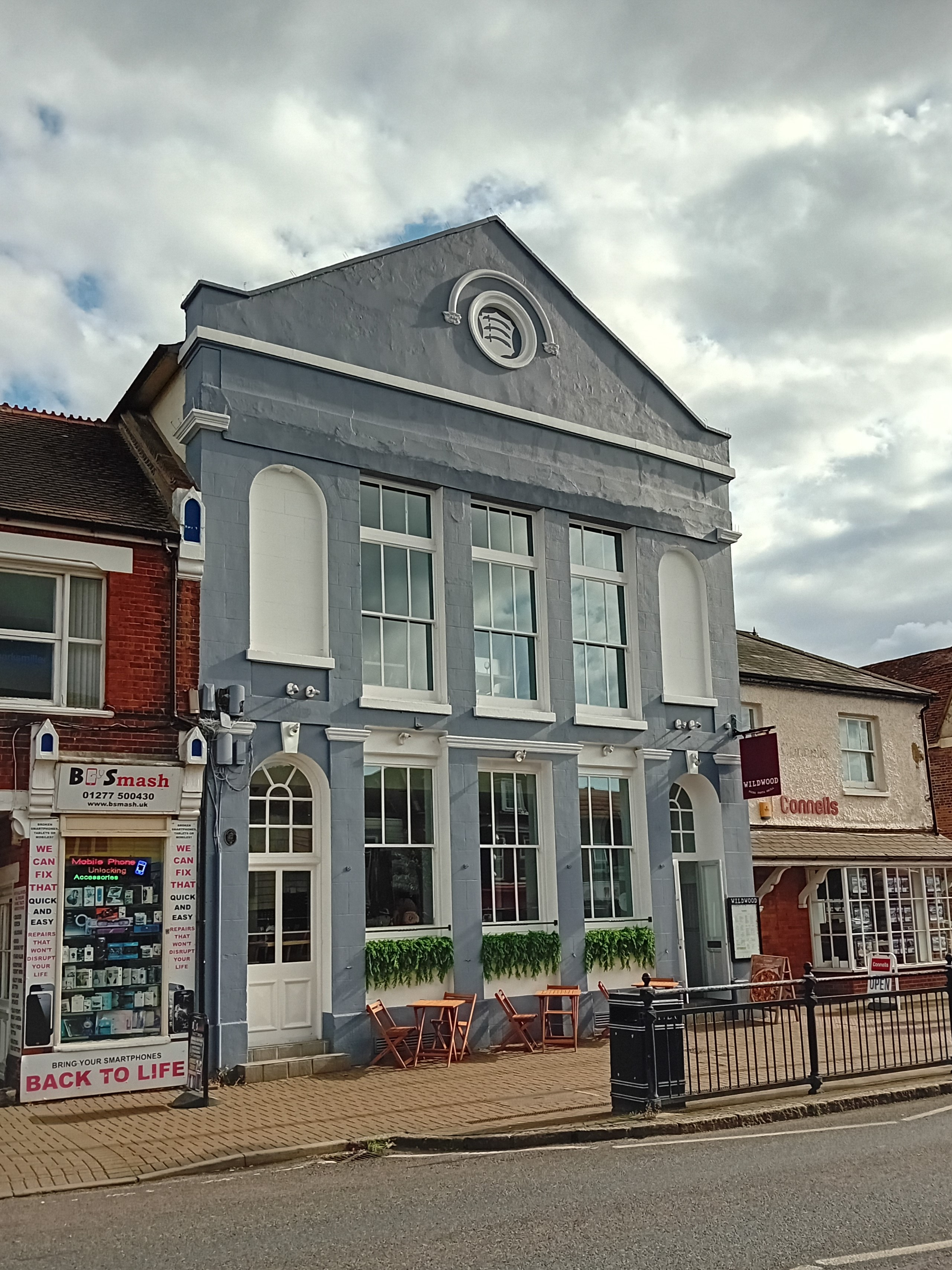
- Old Town Hall, Billericay

- Shown in Essex
- 51.6246°N 0.4169°E
- Location: High Street, Billericay

History
- Built: 1830

Site notes
- Architectural style: Neoclassical style

The Old Town Hall is a municipal building in the High Street, Billericay, Essex, England. The structure, which currently operates as a restaurant, was the meeting place of Billericay Urban District Council.

== History ==
The building was commissioned as a market hall for the town. It was designed in the neoclassical style, built in brick with a cement render finish and was completed in 1830. The design involved a symmetrical main frontage of five bays facing onto the High Street. The building was originally arcaded on the ground floor, so markets could be held, with an assembly room on the first floor. The central section of three bays was fenestrated by three tall casement windows with window sills on the first floor. The outer bays featured round headed doorways with fanlights on the ground floor and niches on the first floor. On the ground floor, the bays were separated by pilasters supporting a cornice. Above the first floor, there was a tall entablature, and a pediment with a roundel containing a coat of arms in the tympanum. Internally, the principal room was the assembly room on the first floor which was used to accommodate the local grammar school.

In 1862, a group of local businessmen formed a company, to be known as the Billericay Town Hall Company to acquire the building and operate it as a public hall. The assembly room was then made available for public meetings, and part of the ground floor was used as a police station. In March 1883, a public meeting was held at which the Great Eastern Railway presented proposals for the construction of the Shenfield–Southend line.

In 1934 most of the Billericay Rural District was reconstituted as Billericay Urban District and, in 1938, the assembly room became the council chamber of Billericay Urban District Council. The police service relocated to new premises further south along the High Street, on the corner with London Road, at that time. The building served as the local civil defence headquarters during the Second World War.

The urban district was renamed Basildon Urban District in 1955, although the council continued to be based at Billericay Town Hall and the adjoining offices in Billericay until the early 1960s when it moved into new premises in Basildon itself. The building remained empty and deteriorating from the late 1970s until the late 1990s. After Essex County Council sold the building to a developer in 1999, a major programme of refurbishment works costing £500,000 was undertaken. The works enabled the building to be converted into a restaurant in 2000. The restaurant initially operated as "Cafe Uno" before being re-branded as "Brasserie Chez Gérard" in 2007. Then, in 2010, a new operator took over the lease and undertook further refurbishment works, to a design by Brown Studio, after which the restaurant was rebranded as "Wildwood".
