= Bowers Gifford and North Benfleet =

- Civil parish
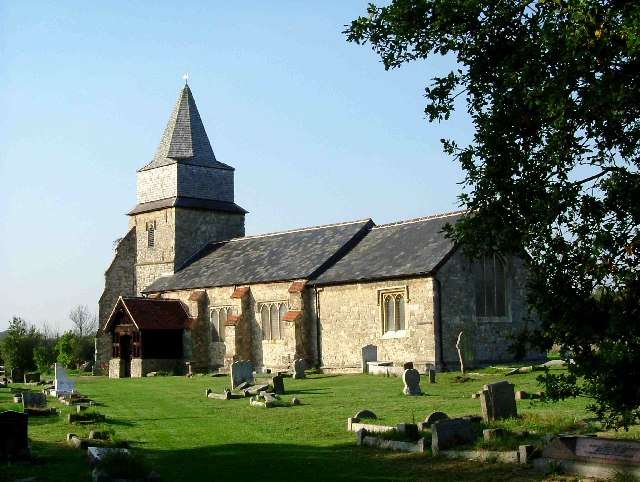
- St Margaret's Church, Bowers Gifford
- Interactive map of Bowers Gifford and North Benfleet
- Coordinates: 51.559944°N 0.52873616°E
- Country: England
- Primary council: Basildon
- County: Essex
- Region: East of England
- Created: 2010
- Status: Civil parish
- Main settlements: Bowers Gifford and North Benfleet

Government
  - Type: Parish council
  - Body: Bowers Gifford and North Benfleet Parish Council

Area
  - Total: 9.81 km^{2} (3.79 sq mi)

Population (2021)
  - Total: 2,055
  - Density: 209/km^{2} (543/sq mi)
- Website: https://e-voice.org.uk/bgnb-parishcouncil/

Bowers Gifford and North Benfleet is a civil parish in the Basildon borough of Essex, England. The parish includes the villages of Bowers Gifford and North Benfleet. At the 2021 census the parish had a population of 2,055.

There are seven listed buildings in Bowers Gifford and North Benfleet. The local council is Bowers Gifford and North Benfleet Parish Council.

== History ==
North Benfleet and Bowers Gifford had each been ancient parishes in the Barstable Hundred of Essex. Both parishes included exclaves on Canvey Island until 1880 when the island was made its own civil parish.

The two parishes were included in the Billericay poor law union in 1835. They therefore became part of the Billericay rural sanitary district in 1872, which was reconstituted as the Billericay Rural District when elected parish and district councils were created in 1894.

In 1934 most of the rural district, including the two parishes of Bowers Gifford and North Benfleet, was converted into the Billericay Urban District. The parishes within it were then classed as urban parishes and so became ineligible to have their own parish councils. All the civil parishes within the urban district were merged into a single parish called Billericay in 1937. The urban district was renamed Basildon in 1955 and was reformed to become the modern Basildon district in 1974, at which point the district also became an unparished area.

The modern civil parish of Bowers Gifford and North Benfleet was created on 1 April 2010 from part of the unparished area following a community governance review.

== Geography ==
The northern boundary is the A127 road. In the east it follows the A1245 road, the A130 road and East Haven Creek. The southern boundary, also formed by East Haven Creek, is with the civil parish of Canvey Island. The western boundary is Vange Creek, Pitseahall Fleet and an irregular boundary mostly aligned to fields.

== Governance ==
There are three tiers of local government covering Bowers Gifford and North Benfleet, at parish, district, and county level: Bowers Gifford and North Benfleet Parish Council, Basildon Borough Council, and Essex County Council. The parish council meets at the Benbow Club at 77 Pound Lane in Bowers Gifford.

== Listed buildings ==
There are seven listed buildings recorded in the National Heritage List for England for Bowers Gifford and North Benfleet. Of these two are grade II* and five are grade II.

Name	Grade	Location	Type	Completed (Note: The date given is the date used by Historic England as significant for the initial building or that of an important part in the structure's description.)	Date designated	Grid ref. (Note: The grid reference is based on the British national grid reference system, sometimes known as OSGB36, used by the Ordnance Survey.) Geo-coordinates	Notes	Entry number (Note: The "List Entry Number" is a unique number assigned to each listed building and scheduled monument by Historic England.)	Image	Wikidata
Bradfield's Farmhouse	II	Burnt Mills Road, North Benfleet	farmhouse		6 January 1975	TQ7530590394; 51°35′06″N 0°31′44″E		1121460	Bradfield's Farmhouse More images	Q26414628
Tiffayne's Farmhouse	II	Burnt Mills Road, North Benfleet			6 January 1975	TQ7551790337; 51°35′04″N 0°31′55″E		1169926	Upload Photo	Q26463122
Church of St Margaret	II*	Church Road, Bowers Gifford	church building		4 July 1955	TQ7559287252; 51°33′25″N 0°31′54″E		1338379	Church of St Margaret More images	Q17557079
Horseshoe Cottage	II	Harrow Road, North Benfleet			6 January 1975	TQ7587390720; 51°35′16″N 0°32′14″E		1122260	Upload Photo	Q26415402
Saddlers' Hall Farmhouse	II	London Road, Bowers Gifford			6 January 1975	TQ7616888459; 51°34′03″N 0°32′26″E		1122233	Upload Photo	Q26415377
Church of All Saints	II*	North Benfleet Hall Road, North Benfleet	church building		4 July 1955	TQ7611989997; 51°34′53″N 0°32′26″E		1170845	Church of All Saints More images	Q17557070
Cottage at Junction with Burnt Mill Road	II	Pound Lane, North Benfleet			6 January 1975	TQ7575590458; 51°35′08″N 0°32′08″E		1338412	Upload Photo	Q26622733
