= North Benfleet =

Village in Essex, England

Coordinates: 51.575683°N 0.532923°E

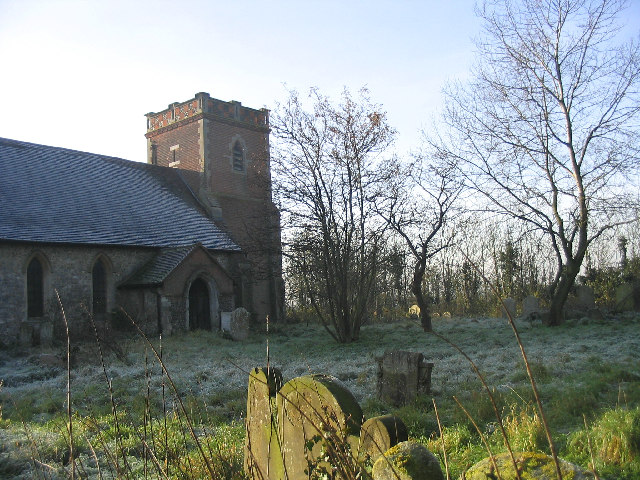
- All Saints Church

- Location within Essex
- OS grid reference: TQ755894
- Civil parish: Bowers Gifford and North Benfleet
- District: Basildon
- Shire county: Essex
- Region: East
- Country: England
- Sovereign state: United Kingdom
- Post town: Wickford
- Postcode district: SS12
- Police: Essex
- Fire: Essex
- Ambulance: East of England
- UK Parliament: Billericay

North Benfleet is a village in the civil parish of Bowers Gifford and North Benfleet, in the Borough of Basildon in Essex, England. It is located between the towns of Basildon to the west and South Benfleet to the east. It adjoins the small village of Bowers Gifford.

== Toponymy ==
The name Benfleet means "tree stream", possibly deriving from an old bridge made from tree trunks, from Beamfloet (beam-river)found in the Anglo-Saxon Chronicle in 894 AD.

== History ==
In the Domesday Book of 1086 there were four estates or manors listed at a vill called Benflet in the Barstable Hundred of Essex. The area subsequently became the two parishes of North Benfleet and South Benfleet.

North Benfleet's parish church, dedicated to All Saints, dates from at least the 13th century. It was largely rebuilt in the 17th century. The building was closed by the Church of England in the 1990s. After some years of disuse, it reopened as an Orthodox church in 2013. North Benfleet now forms part of a Church of England ecclesiastical parish called Bowers Gifford with North Benfleet, which uses St Margaret's Church at Bowers Gifford as its parish church.

When elected parish and district councils were established in 1894, North Benfleet was included in the Billericay Rural District. In 1934 the rural district was abolished and North Benfleet became part of the new Billericay Urban District, which covered Billericay, Wickford, Laindon, Pitsea, and surrounding rural areas. In 1937 all the civil parishes in the urban district were united into a single parish of Billericay. At the 1931 census (the last before the abolition of the civil parish), North Benfleet had a population of 560.

The urban district was renamed Basildon in 1955, and was reformed to become the modern Basildon district in 1974, at which point the district also became an unparished area. The modern civil parish of Bowers Gifford and North Benfleet was created in 2010 from part of the unparished area following a community governance review.
