= Laindon High Road School =

School in Laindon, Essex, England

Laindon High Road School (formerly Laindon High Road County Secondary Modern) was a school located in Laindon, Essex. The school closed in 1998.
