= Charles Leatherland, Baron Leatherland =

British journalist and politician (1898–1992)

Charles Edward Leatherland, Baron Leatherland OBE MSM DL (18 April 1898 – 18 December 1992) was a British journalist and Labour Party politician.

== Early life ==
Charles Edward Leatherland was born in Aston, Birmingham, on 18 April 1898. He was the eldest son of John Edward Leatherland, an Army bandmaster. His mother Elizabeth Leatherland (née Abbis), a blacksmith's daughter, died when he was 9 years old. He attended Harborne School, Birmingham, and left school at the age of 14.

In 1914 at the start of the First World War he joined the 16th Battalion of the Royal Warwickshire Regiment. In 1916 he was transferred to Xth Corps headquarters where he remained for the rest of the war. He became an Acting Sergeant Major and served in France, Belgium and Germany. He was awarded the Meritorious Service Medal.

In 1919 he returned to Birmingham and worked for Birmingham Corporation. He was a founder member and Midlands Organiser of the National Union of Ex-Service Men.

In 1921 he moved to Macclesfield and became chief reporter and sub-editor on a local newspaper, the Macclesfield Courier. In 1923 and 1924 he won gold medals in an international essay writing competition organised by the London Chamber of Commerce.

== Labour Party Press and Publicity Department ==
In 1924 he moved to London to work as Parliamentary Correspondent in the Labour Party Press and Publicity Department. He became second in command to the Labour Press Officer, William Henderson. In 1925 he wrote eleven chapters of The Book of the Labour Party, the first major history of the Labour Party and the Labour movement.

In 1926 he played a significant behind-the-scenes role in the 1926 general strike writing much of the contents of the British Worker, the TUC strike newspaper, including the TUC's "Message to All Workers" which appeared on the front cover of every issue.

== Daily Herald ==
In 1929 Leatherland became a political sub-editor on the Daily Herald. In 1938 he became assistant news editor. By 1941 he had been appointed news editor. In the 1950s he acted as night editor and then assistant editor, which he combined with the duties of political editor. He retired from the Daily Herald in 1963.

Leatherland was also a freelance journalist. He wrote a weekly political gossip column for the Sunday Dispatch and weekly articles in the magazines John Bull and The Passing Show, both published by the Daily Herald owners Odhams Press. During the 1950s and 1960s he wrote a weekly column in the local government periodical the Municipal Journal. In the 1960s he wrote a series of articles on local government themes for the National and Local Government Officers' Association (NALGO), the local government trade union. These articles were widely used by schools and colleges in the teaching of civics.

== Essex County Council ==
Leatherland moved to the Old Rectory in Dunton Wayletts, Essex in 1934. He came to play a prominent role in Essex politics. He was Chairman of the Dunton Parish Invasion Committee and made radio broadcasts for the BBC during the Second World War. After spells as a district councillor in Laindon and Billericay, he became an Alderman on Essex County Council in 1946. He served as a Labour member of Essex County Council for 22 years. For 15 years he was Leader of the Labour group. He chaired the Finance Committee for several years, was vice-chairman for six years, and was County Council chairman in 1960–61. He also spent 15 years as Chairman of the Eastern Regional Council of the Labour Party. In 1951 he was awarded the Order of the British Empire (OBE) for political and public service. He lived latterly at Buckhurst Hill.

== University of Essex ==
Whilst on Essex County Council, Leatherland campaigned for Essex to be the location of a new university. He played a leading role in the foundation of the University of Essex and became its first treasurer, serving in this role until 1972. In 1973 the university awarded him an honorary doctorate.

He also served as a magistrate for 26 years and became deputy chairman of the magistrates bench in Epping, Essex. He played a prominent part in the establishment of Basildon as a New Town and served as a member of Basildon Development Corporation. He also served on the Essex Territorial Army Association for many years. He was appointed as a deputy lieutenant of Essex in 1963.

== Life peerage ==
On 16 December 1964 he was created a life peer as Baron Leatherland, of Dunton in the County of Essex. He attended the House of Lords for twenty-five years and was a frequent speaker in debates.

Charles Leatherland died in Epping, Essex at the age of 94 on 18 December 1992.

== Personal life ==
Charles Leatherland married Mary Elizabeth ('Mollie') Morgan in Macclesfield in 1922. They had a daughter, Irene Mary, and a son, John Charles. Irene Leatherland worked at Labour Party head office at Transport House from 1947 to 1962 becoming the Party's Conference Officer. John Leatherland served in the Army and then worked in advertising. Mollie Leatherland died in 1987 at the age of 87.

=== Arms ===
Coat of arms of Charles Leatherland, Baron Leatherland
Notes Granted 20 June 1966 by Sir Anthony Wagner, Garter King of Arms. Crest On a chapeau Gules turned up Ermine and in front of an arm embowed vested Azure cuffed Gules the hand Proper grasping a trumpet Or a seax fesswise Proper hilt and pomel Or. Escutcheon Gules a pen point downwards and a sword point upwards Proper hilt and pomel Or in saltire between in pale two open books Proper edged Or bound Azure and in fess two roses Argent barbed and seeded Proper. Supporters On either side an heraldic antelope Sable armed and crined and unguled Or and gorged with a baron's coronet Proper with the chain reflexed over the back of pendent from the coronet a seaz as the crest. Motto To Thine Own Self Be True

== Publications ==
- Could Revolution Win? in 'The Nineteenth Century and After' (1921)
- Part-author The Book of the Labour Party ed. Herbert Treacy (1925)
- Village Invasion Committee Plans in Bulletins from Britain. British Information Services (1942)
- A Day in the Life of a news editor in The Inky Way Annual 1947–48. World's Press News Publishing Ltd (1948)
