= Dunton =

Dunton is the name of more than one place.

In the United Kingdom:

- Dunton, Bedfordshire
- Dunton, Buckinghamshire
- Dunton, Norfolk
- Dunton Bassett, Leicestershire
- Dunton Green, Kent
- Dunton, Essex
- Dunton Wayletts, Essex
- Dunton Technical Centre, Essex

== See also ==
- Danton (name)
