= Dunton Plotlands =

Coordinates: 51°33′40″N 0°23′40″E

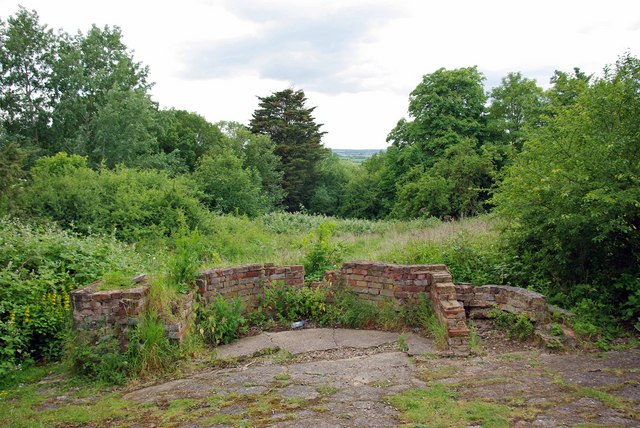
Remains of a bungalow in the nature reserve

The Dunton Plotlands was an area of small rural plots of land in Dunton Wayletts, southern Essex inhabited from the 1930s to the 1980s. Dunton Plotlands is situated to the west of Laindon and the Langdon Hills, now on the edge of the Basildon district.

== History ==
The 'plotlands' consisted of small plots of land sold in the first half of the 20th century to people who built weekend cottages, holiday bungalows or smallholdings there. Many of the people building weekend cottages here would have come out from London.

With the outbreak of the Second World War, many weekenders moved out to their plots on a permanent basis, to escape the worst effects of the Blitz. This period saw the Dunton population at its highest with up to 25,000 people living in the area, often with unsurfaced roads and limited water supplies.

After the Second World War, Basildon was designated as a New Town encompassing the plotlands here and in the surrounding areas of Laindon and Pitsea. The plotlands gradually emptied as the area was compulsorily purchased to build the New Town.

== Preservation ==
Today, Dunton Plotlands is part of the Essex Wildlife Trust's Langdon Nature Reserve. The Langdon Visitor Centre and the Haven Plotlands Museum, housed in a converted bungalow, exhibit the natural and social history of the area.

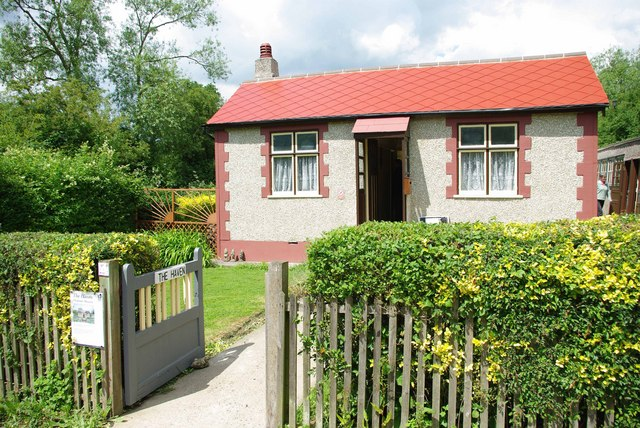
The surviving bungalow

The Plotlands is still a wooded area where a small number of cottages, and some of the original grid of grass tracks remain. Visitors can look around a preserved bungalow. Many wildlife events are held throughout the year.
