= Ernest Longstaffe =

British composer (1884–1958)

Ernest Longstaffe (5 April 1884 – 23 November 1958) was an English composer, conductor, and radio producer.

He was born in Newport, Essex, the son of the landscape painter Edgar Longstaffe. He started his career in concert parties and summer variety shows. He wrote many tunes for the big band, including "When the Sergeant-Major's on Parade", first published in 1925, for which he wrote both words and music. He also wrote a musical comedy, His Girl, and the revue Up With the Lark.

Ernest Longstaffe made his first radio broadcasts in 1926, as composer and presenter of a variety programme, The Bee Bee Cabaret. He became a leading producer of music and variety programmes in the early days of the BBC, and also operated as the programmes' composer and conductor, often of the BBC Dance Orchestra. The BBC radio programmes that he produced included Palace of Varieties – reportedly the favourite radio programme of King George VI – and The Happidrome. Although none of his programmes were televised, Longstaffe insisted that all his radio performers wore stage costume when performing.

He retired from the BBC in 1949, but continued to appear on Palace of Varieties until shortly before his death, in hospital in London in 1958 at the age of 74.
