= National Union of Ex-Service Men =

Ex-servicemen's organisation in London

The National Union of Ex-Servicemen (NUX) was a socialist ex-servicemen's organisation founded in London in early 1919 with close links with the Labour Party. Many of its members were formerly supporters of the National Federation of Discharged and Demobilized Sailors and Soldiers and the Soldiers, Sailors and Airmen's Union (SSAU). Within six months it had grown from one branch with fifty members to over one hundred branches and claimed a membership of nearly 100,000. Its membership was boosted by the stance of the Federation against the 1919 United Kingdom railway strike in the autumn of that year: it called on Prime Minister David Lloyd George to "hold firm against Labour tyranny", causing tension in its ranks and prompting many left-wing members to leave and join NUX, which had supported the strike. By the end of 1919 NUX had 200,000 members and 200 branches.

The NUX was allied to the Labour Party. It also established close links to the Independent Labour Party. It articulated the grievances of ex-servicemen and campaigned for better living conditions for former soldiers by raising issues such as unemployment, higher back pay, better pensions, inadequate housing and improved medical care for soldiers disabled by injury. It played a role as a claimants union aiming to secure justice for disabled former soldiers and adequate provision for the widows and families of soldiers who died in the First World War. It argued in favour of requisitioning empty homes for the use of unemployed ex-servicemen, for land reform and a tax on profiteering landlords, and pressed for reform of military courts martial. It also pushed to defend and extend the rights of former soldiers with shell shock, forcing the Labour Party to pass a motion condemning their treatment by the government as "pauper lunatics", and bringing the demand for better mental health treatment for ex-servicemen into the political mainstream. It tried to organise a national rent strike. It also supported democratisation of the army. But - unlike other ex-servicemen's organisations - it called upon ex-servicemen to unite to improve society as a whole rather than simply campaigning on veteran's issues. The Union's view was that soldiers should not be seen as a caste separate from the rest of society: that when they served they were "workers-in-uniform", and that when they ended their duty they went back to being workers.

The Union was based in London but had a strong regional presence especially in Birmingham, Glasgow and Lancashire. Its leaders included G. D. H. Cole, Ernest Thurtle and Clement Attlee. Its first President was Duncan Carmichael who was Secretary of the London Trades Council. He was succeeded by John Beckett. Ernest Mander, a London lawyer who sold his home to help finance the NUX and later emigrated to New Zealand, became General Secretary. The NUX produced a monthly publication New World. It operated on a shoestring and always struggled financially although it received some financial support from the ILP.

The NUX was kept under close surveillance by the newly formed Home Office Directorate of Intelligence because of Government fears that it might be promoting subversion or revolution, although little evidence of subversive activity was found. A more militant international offshoot, the International Union of Ex-Servicemen (I.U.X) was formed in Glasgow in 1919, although it claimed only 7,000 members by November 1919. The NUX also supported the Hands Off Russia campaign to oppose British support for the anti-Communist White movement in the Russian Civil War.

Fifty-three NUX supporting Labour Party candidates were elected in the urban district council elections of 1920 but by the autumn of 1920 and following a ballot of its members, the NUX reconstituted itself as a loose federation of autonomous branches many of which were then absorbed into the ILP, the Labour Party or the Communist Party, and it was wound up as a national organisation.

In the eighteen months since its formation, the NUX had conducted vigorous propaganda campaigns throughout Britain and held an estimated 47,000 meetings. The NUX also served as an apprenticeship for future political campaigners such as John Beckett, who became a Labour MP and later a leading fascist, and the Birmingham journalists and politicians Jim Simmons and CE Leatherland.
