= Edgar Longstaffe =

English painter

Edgar Longstaffe (1852 – 7 December 1933) was a well-known English landscape painter of the Victorian era.

== Biography ==
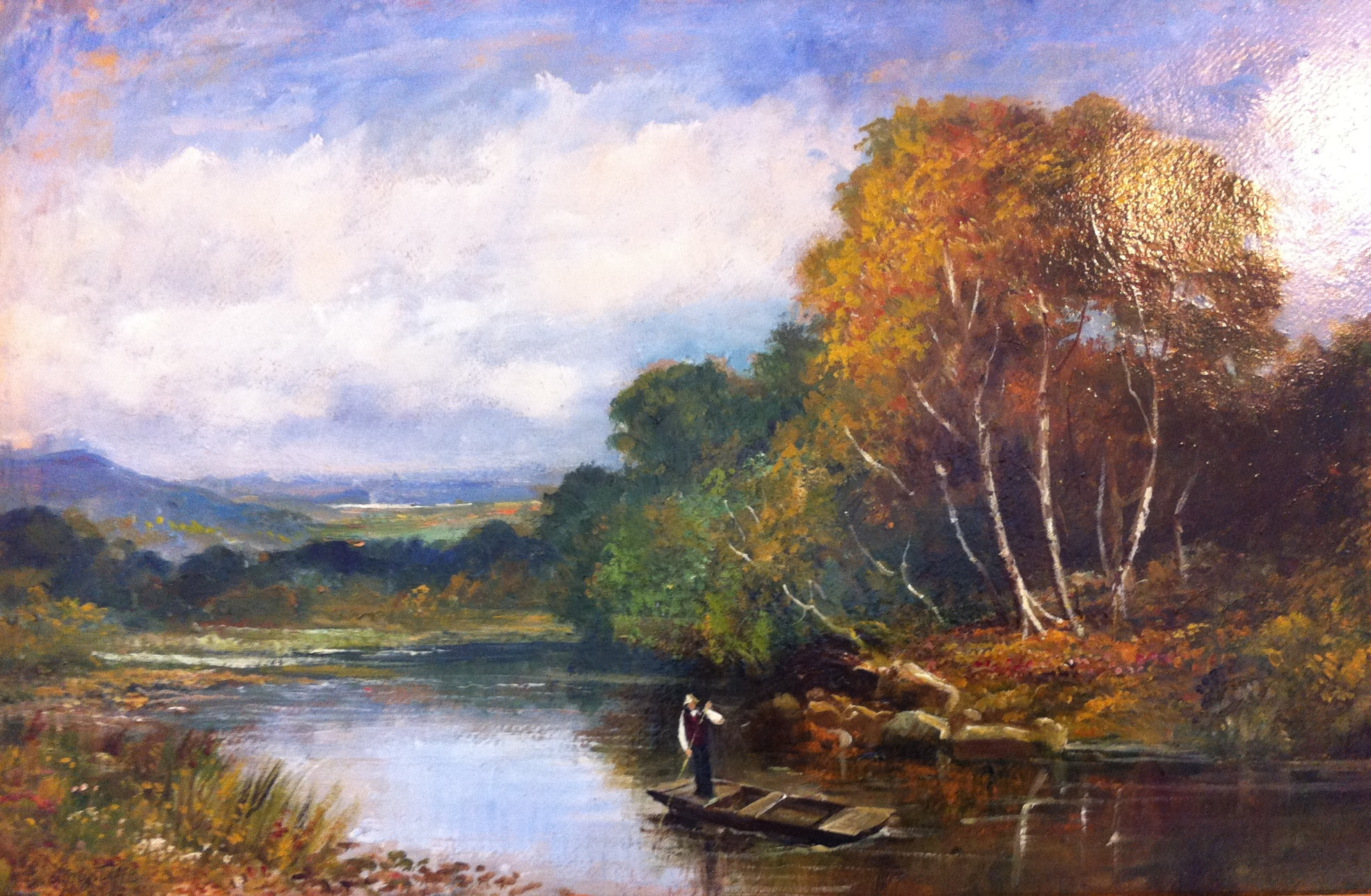
River Landscape with Punt painted by Edgar Longstaffe (oil on board)

Evening on the Tay painted by Edgar Longstaffe. Painted c. 1910.

Longstaffe was born near Derby in Derbyshire, England. The son of a doctor, he married and moved to Newport, Essex. During the 1880s he exhibited five times at the Royal Academy and at the Royal Hibernian Academy and at Birmingham. A prolific painter, many of his original works, most commonly signed with a monogram but sometimes initialed 'E.L.' or signed 'E Longstaffe', must be in existence today.

He was for some years on the staff of Messrs Raphael Tuck & Sons, being sent by them to all the principal beauty spots of the British Isles to obtain sketches for reproduction work in the earlier days of the art picture postcard. He was especially fond of portraying the scenery of the Scottish Highlands, often with cattle, and he excelled in the painting of water. Large numbers of vintage postcards featuring Longstaffe's artwork remain in existence and are frequently to be found in online auctions.

Later in life he moved to Laindon, Essex where he lived for 25 years. He was buried alongside his wife in Laindon churchyard. His son Ernest Longstaffe went on to become a famous composer and producer.
