= Nevendon =

Former parish and village in Essex, England

Coordinates: 51.5949°N 0.5319°E

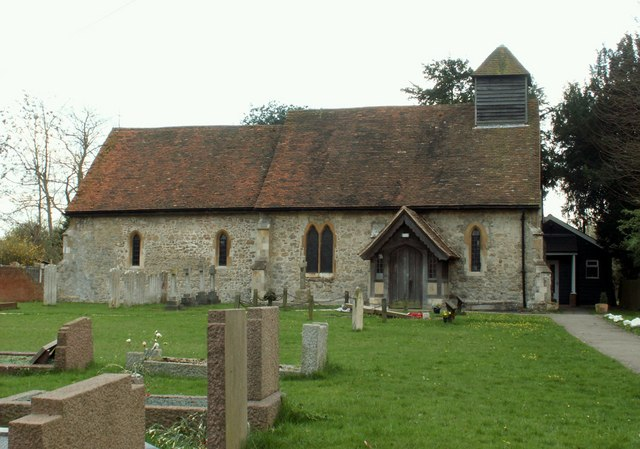
- St Peter's Church

- Location within Essex
- District: Basildon
- Shire county: Essex
- Region: East
- Country: England
- Sovereign state: United Kingdom
- Police: Essex
- Fire: Essex
- Ambulance: East of England

Nevendon is an area in the Borough of Basildon in Essex, England. It was formerly a parish and village. The village historically comprised loose-knit development along the road from St Peter's Church in the south up to the moated manor house of Nevendon Manor in the north.

The A127 road was built through the village in the early 1920s, severing the two ends of the village from each other. The civil parish of Nevendon was abolished in 1937. In 1949, the part of Nevendon south of the A127 was included in the designated area for the new town of Basildon. That area, which includes the part of the old Nevendon village around St Peter's Church, now forms part of the built up area of Basildon. The part of the old Nevendon village north of the A127, including the area around Nevendon Manor, now forms part of the civil parish of Wickford.

The ecclesiastical parish of Nevendon has also been abolished. The part of the old parish north of the A127 has been added to the ecclesiastical parish of Wickford and Runwell, and the part south of the A127 now forms part of an ecclesiastical parish called "Pitsea with Nevendon".

== History ==
The name Nevendon probably means "at the level valley", although it may alternatively mean the valley of someone called Hnefa. The name was historically sometimes given as "Newendon".

In the Domesday Book of 1086 there were two estates or manors recorded at the vill of Nezendena in the Barstable Hundred of Essex. The two manors were not named in Domesday Book, but were later known as Nevendon or Bromfords to the north, and Fryerns to the south.

No church or priest is recorded in the Domesday Book, but Nevendon became a parish. The oldest surviving part of its parish church, dedicated to St Peter, is the 13th century chancel. It is thought that the chancel was probably built adjoining an earlier nave of unknown date, which was subsequently rebuilt in the 14th century. The church is now a Grade II* listed building.

At the northern end of the village was the moated manor house of the manor of Nevendon or Bromfords, now known as Nevendon Manor. The current house dates back to the 16th century but is thought to be on the site of an earlier building. Nevendon Hall, opposite the church, was built in 1833.

In the 1840s, Nevendon was described as a straggling village. Ordnance Survey maps from the 19th century show a cluster of buildings around St Peter's Church, from which occasional houses stretched northwards up to Nevendon Manor (then called Little Bromfords) along the lane towards Wickford.

The A127 from London to Southend-on-Sea was built in the early 1920s through Nevendon, passing north of the end of the village around St Peter's Church and south of the end of the village around Nevendon Manor. The road opened in 1924.

When elected parish and district councils were established in 1894, Nevendon was included in the Billericay Rural District. In 1934 the rural district was abolished and Nevendon became part of the new Billericay Urban District, which covered Billericay, Wickford, Laindon, Pitsea and surrounding rural areas. In 1937 all the civil parishes in the urban district were united into a single parish of Billericay. At the 1931 census (the last before the abolition of the civil parish), Nevendon had a population of 373.

In 1949, Basildon was designated a new town, with the area for the new town covering the part of the old Nevendon village south of the A127. This area has now been extensively developed. Billericay Urban District was renamed Basildon Urban District in 1955 and was reformed to become the modern Basildon district in 1974.

In 2022 a new civil parish of Wickford was created, with its area including the part of the old Nevendon village north of the A127.

The old parish of Nevendon has also been split for ecclesiastical purposes along the A127. The part south of the A127, including St Peter's Church, now forms part of an ecclesiastical parish called Pitsea with Nevendon. The part of the old parish north of the A127 now forms part of the ecclesiastical parish of Wickford and Runwell.
