= Lee Chapel, Essex =

Coordinates: 51.5639°N 0.4462°E

Lee Chapel
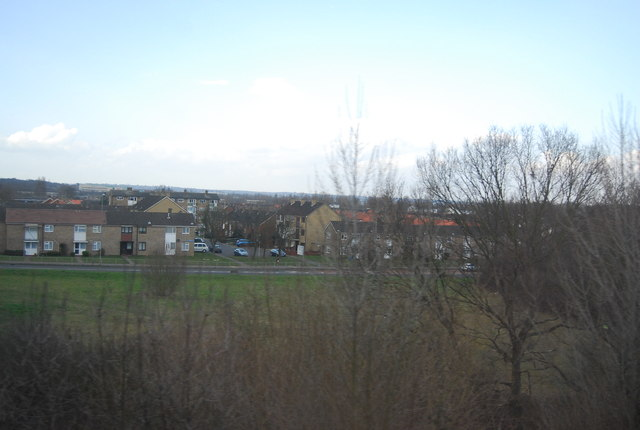

- Location within Essex
- District: Basildon
- Shire county: Essex
- Region: East
- Country: England
- Sovereign state: United Kingdom
- Police: Essex
- Fire: Essex
- Ambulance: East of England

Lee Chapel, East Lee or East Ley is an area of Basildon, in the county of Essex, England. It is about 11 miles (18 km) from Chelmsford.

== History ==
The name "Lee" is Anglo Saxon and means 'woodland clearing', the chapel part comes from a medieval chapel. Lee Chapel was recorded in the Domesday Book as Lea. Lee Chapel was formerly an extra-parochial tract, in 1858 it became a civil parish. In 1894, Lee Chapel became part of Billericay Rural District, in 1935 it became part of Billericay Urban District, on 1 April 1937 the parish was abolished to form Billericay. At the 1931 census (the last before the abolition of the parish), Lee Chapel had a population of 882. In 1955, Lee Chapel became part of Basildon Urban District. In 1974, Lee Chapel became part of Basildon non-metropolitan district in the non-metropolitan county of Essex.
