= Vange =

Village in Essex, England

Coordinates: 51.560114°N 0.487167°E

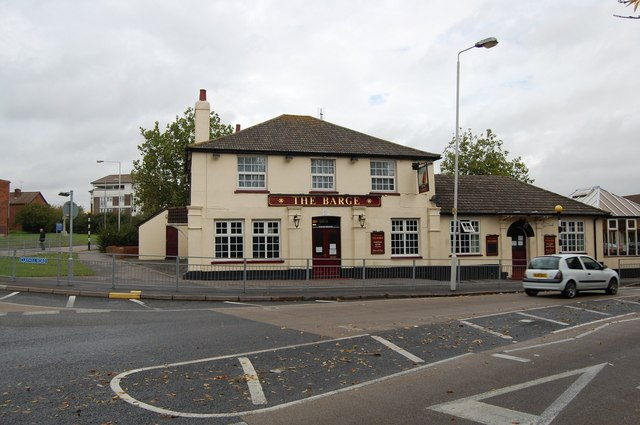
- The former Barge public house

- Location within Essex
- Population: 10,401 (Ward, 2021)
- OS grid reference: TQ725875
- District: Basildon
- Shire county: Essex
- Region: East
- Country: England
- Sovereign state: United Kingdom
- Post town: BASILDON
- Postcode district: SS16
- Dialling code: 01268
- Police: Essex
- Fire: Essex
- Ambulance: East of England
- UK Parliament: South Basildon and East Thurrock

Vange is an area in the south of Basildon in Essex, England. Historically, a separate village and parish, Vange remained a small village until the first half of the 20th century, when it experienced significant plotlands development. In 1949, it was included in the designated area for the new town of Basildon, leading to further residential development. It now forms part of the built up area of Basildon. It gives its name to one of the wards of the Borough of Basildon. At the 2021 census the ward had a population of 10,401.

== History ==
The name Vange means "fen district".

In the Domesday Book of 1086 there were two estates or manors listed at the vill of Phenge in the Barstable Hundred of Essex.

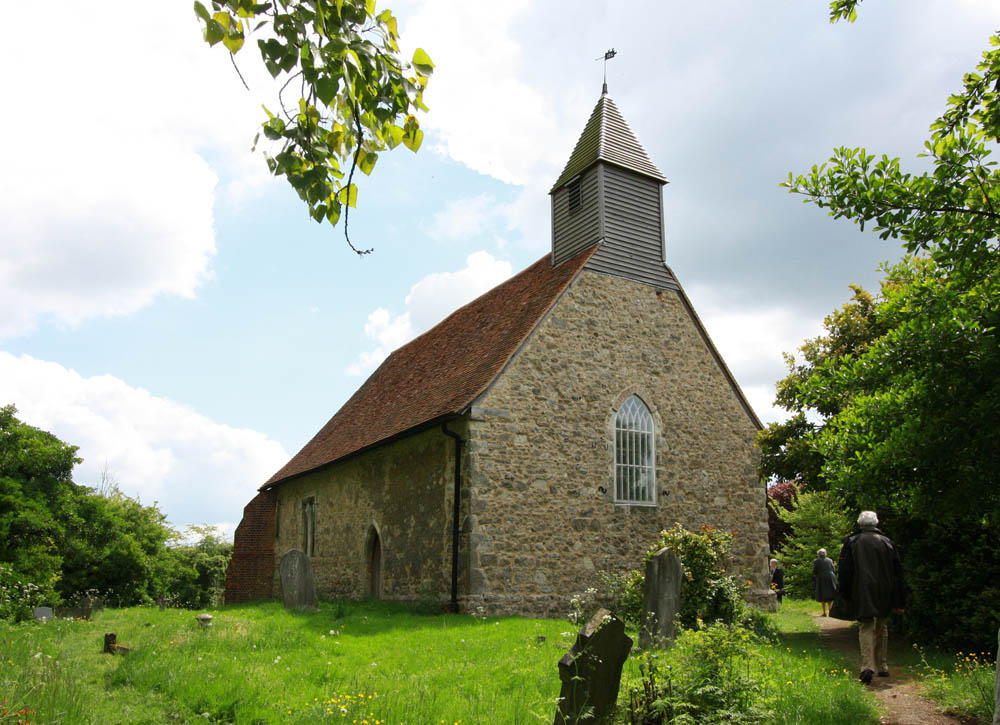
All Saints Church, Vange

No church or priest is mentioned in the Domesday Book, but Vange became a parish. All Saints Church appears to have been built shortly after the Norman Conquest, in the late 11th century or 12th century. It has been altered and repaired many times over the centuries since then. It is faced in ragstone and flint, with some areas of alternating brickwork and tufa. It has a small timber bell turret.

In the 1840s, Vange was described as a small village at the head of a creek with a wharf for barges. The parish at that time had a population of 169. The manor house of Vange Hall stood on the hill to the north of the village; it has since been demolished and the site forms part of Basildon Golf Club.

Nearby Pitsea railway station opened in 1855, encouraging development in the area. The main road through Vange is High Road / London Road, later numbered as the A13 until it was bypassed in the 1970s and became the B1464. High Road was developed with shops and businesses from the late 19th century. In the first half of the 20th century it was a busy shopping centre, at a time when the facilities in neighbouring Pitsea were relatively limited. The railway station was renamed "Pitsea for Vange" in 1932, but reverted to just being called Pitsea in 1952.

The area's heavy clay soil made for poor quality agricultural land. The late 19th century and early 20th century was a period of wider agricultural depression, and many farms in the area were sold for development as plotlands, especially in the 1920s and 1930s. People bought individual plots on which to build a house, but there was very little provision of infrastructure and many of the houses were of a poor quality.

When elected parish and district councils were established in 1894, Vange was included in the Billericay Rural District. The population of the parish was too small to automatically be given a parish council, and so it initially only had a parish meeting. A parish council was subsequently established the following year.

Most of the rural district, including Vange, was converted into the Billericay Urban District in 1934, which also covered Billericay, Wickford, Laindon, Pitsea, and surrounding rural areas. The civil parishes within the urban district were thereafter classed as urban parishes and so ceased to be eligible to have parish councils. The parishes within the urban district were united into a single parish called Billericay in 1937. At the 1931 census (the last before the abolition of the civil parish), Vange had a population of 2,300.

In 1949, Vange was included in the designated area for the new town of Basildon. Billericay Urban District was renamed Basildon Urban District in 1955 and was reformed to become the modern Basildon district in 1974. As part of the new town's development programme, the plotlands around Vange were gradually replaced with modern housing estates, and almost all the pre-new town shops and other buildings along High Road were demolished. Vange now forms part of the Basildon built up area as defined by the Office for National Statistics.

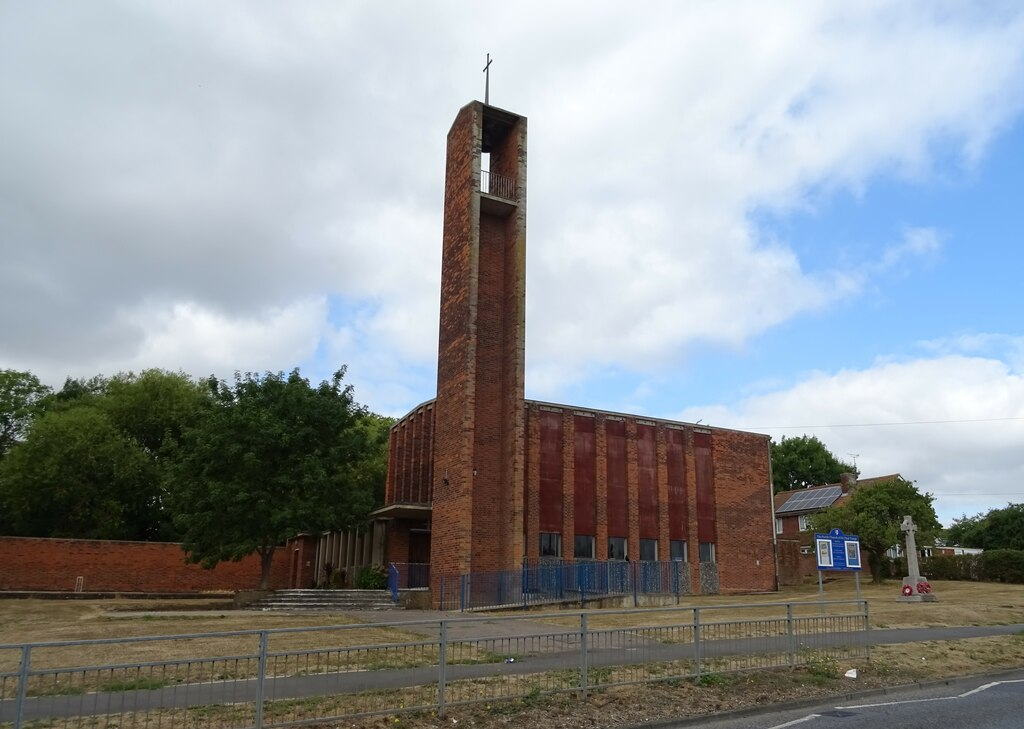
St Chad's Church

A new church dedicated to St Chad was completed in 1958, in a more central location to modern Vange than the old parish church of All Saints. All Saints was declared redundant in 1996, and it was transferred to the Churches Conservation Trust in 2003.

Some of the cleared plotlands were left as open space, and now form the Vange Hill Local Nature Reserve, which covers 30 acres (120,000 m^{2}) lying next to Basildon Golf Course.

One of the few pre-new town buildings to survive on the High Road is the former Barge Inn. It closed as a pub in 2015 and the building was subsequently converted into an Islamic community centre in 2021.

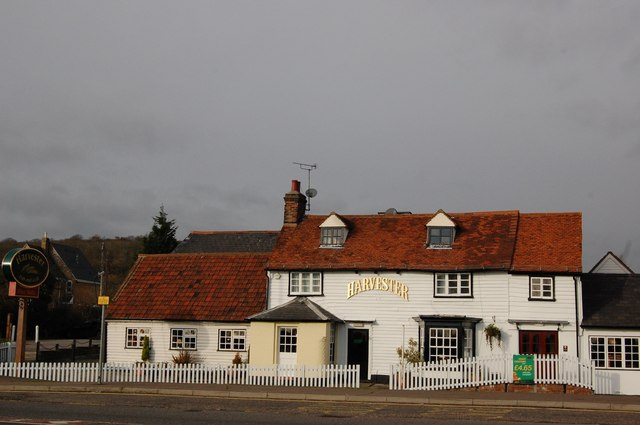
The Five Bells, London Road

The only pub left in Vange is now the Five Bells on London Road, which dates back to the early 18th century.

Vange Marsh, to the south of Vange, is a wetland habitat.
