= Billericay Rural District =

Former local government area in Essex, England

Coordinates: 51.6°N 0.4°E

Billericay
- Rural district
- Area
  - 1911: 49,394 acres (19,989 ha)
  - 1931: 49,393 acres (19,989 ha)
- Population
  - 1901: 17,504
  - 1931: 39,700
- History
  - Created: 28 December 1894
  - Abolished: 31 March 1934
  - Succeeded by: Brentwood Urban District, Billericay Urban District, Chelmsford Rural District
- Status: Rural district

Billericay Rural District was a rural district in Essex, England, between 1894 and 1934. It covered the town of Billericay and surrounding parishes. The district was abolished in 1934, when most of its area was converted into Billericay Urban District.

== History ==
The district had its origins in the Billericay Poor Law Union, which had been created in 1835 for a group of parishes to collectively deliver their responsibilities under the poor laws. A workhouse to serve the union was completed in 1840 on a site off Norsey Road in Billericay.

In 1872, sanitary districts were established. In rural areas, public health and local government responsibilities were given to the existing boards of guardians of poor law unions. There were no urban sanitary districts within the area of the poor law union, and so the Billericay Rural Sanitary District covered the same area as the poor law union.

Rural sanitary districts were reconstituted as rural districts with their own elected councils with effect from 28 December 1894, under the Local Government Act 1894. The link with the poor law union continued in that all the rural district councillors were thereafter ex officio members of the board of guardians. Billericay Rural District Council held its first official meeting on 1 January 1895. The first chairman of the council was Rev. David Jones Davies, the rector of North Benfleet, who had served as chairman of the board of guardians for some years previously.

In 1899 the parish of Brentwood was removed from the rural district and converted into its own urban district.

The rural district council met at the workhouse in Billericay, and its staff were based at various offices both in the district and in nearby towns. The workhouse later became St Andrew's Hospital.

The southern part of the district, particularly in the area served by the railway stations at Laindon and Pitsea, saw significant plotlands development, especially during the 1920s and 1930s. People bought an individual plot to build a house, but little infrastructure was provided to serve the plotlands, and many of the houses built were of poor quality.

The rural district council's powers were considered inadequate to provide the infrastructure needed in such areas, and so it was decided to convert the rural district into an urban district with more powers. An inquiry into the proposal was held in 1932. There were debates about whether the boundaries for the new urban district should match those of the old rural district, and objections from several of the district's more rural parishes to being included in an urban district.

It was ultimately decided to transfer the western part of the district adjoining Brentwood into an expanded Brentwood Urban District, and the parish of Mountnessing and a more rural part of the district north of the railway between Billericay and Wickford to the Chelmsford Rural District. The remainder of the old rural district became the new Billericay Urban District. These changes came into effect in 1934.

== Parishes ==
The civil parishes in the district were:

- Basildon
- Bowers Gifford
- Brentwood (removed in 1899 to become its own urban district)
- Childerditch
- Downham
- Dunton
- East Horndon
- Great Burstead
- Hutton
- Ingrave
- Laindon
- Lee Chapel
- Little Burstead
- Little Warley
- Mountnessing
- Nevendon
- North Benfleet
- Pitsea
- Ramsden Bellhouse
- Ramsden Crays
- Shenfield
- South Weald
- Vange
- West Horndon
- Wickford.

Although the district was named after Billericay, there was no parish with the same name; the town formed part of the parish of Great Burstead instead.
