= Dunton Wayletts =

Hamlet in Essex, England

Coordinates: 51.586°N 0.389°E

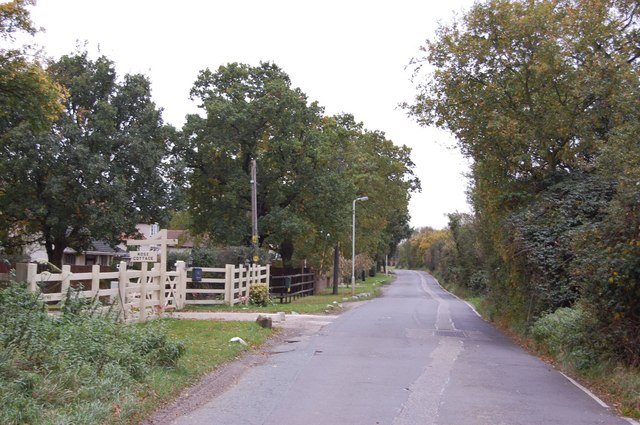
- A road in Dunton Wayletts

- Location within Essex
- OS grid reference: TQ654902
- District: Basildon
- Shire county: Essex
- Region: East
- Country: England
- Sovereign state: United Kingdom
- Post town: BRENTWOOD
- Postcode district: CM13
- Dialling code: 01268
- Police: Essex
- Fire: Essex
- Ambulance: East of England
- UK Parliament: Basildon and Billericay

Dunton Wayletts or Dunton is a hamlet in the Borough of Basildon in Essex, England. It lies on the western outskirts of the borough's main town of Basildon, adjoining the suburb of Laindon. It was historically a separate village and parish.

== Toponymy ==
The name Dunton has Saxon origins ("dun" meaning hill and "tun" meaning town). Wayletts is also derived from the Saxon ("Weylete") and Old English ("Weg-gelaetu") both meaning a place where ways or roads meet.

There have been many reported names for Dunton, including:

- Dantuna
- Dunton
- Dunton(a) juxta Herwardstoke
- Dunton(a) Weylate
- Duntune
- Dont(h)on(e)
- Dounton
- Dounton Weylate
- Dounton Waylate
- Downton Waylate
- Denton

== History ==
The earliest reference to Dunton is found in the Domesday Book of 1086 when 'Dantona' was held by Bishop Odo of Bayeux (half brother of William the Conqueror). During the Middle Ages, the parish of Dunton was divided into two manors: Dunton Hall and Fryern Manor. In the 12th century Dunton came under the ownership of the Abbey of Bec-Hellouin. In the 1440s the manor of Dunton was granted to King's College, Cambridge. The manor of Dunton remained in the possession of King's College until well into the 18th century.

Dunton was an ancient parish. The name Dunton was usually used for the parish in civil matters whilst the name Dunton Wayletts was usually used in ecclesiastical matters. In 1801 the population of Dunton was 121. In 1837 the parish comprised 2,000 acres of land out of which 1,719 was cultivated land, 222 acres meadow pasture, 37 acres woodland, 22 acres was common land and 17 acres belonging to the Rector. In the 1841 census the population of Dunton was 194. In 1931 it had a population of 661.

On 1 April 1934 the civil parish was abolished. Part was transferred to Brentwood, but the majority of the area, including the village itself, was absorbed into the Billericay Urban District. It briefly became part of the urban parish of Little Burstead until three years later in 1937 all the parishes in the urban district were united to form a single parish called Billericay. Billericay Urban District was renamed Basildon Urban District in 1955, with Dunton having been administered as part of Basildon ever since.

In 1967 the Ford Motor Company opened the Dunton Technical Centre on former agricultural land at the north end of Dunton.

Dunton's amenities declined during the 1970s. The village school closed in 1977 and the one village shop closed a year later.

In November 2023, Brentwood Council gave permission to build Dunton Hills Garden Village in the parish of West Horndon to the west of Lower Dunton Road, between the A127 and the c2c trainline. The village will include 3,700 homes on land owned by Brentwood Borough Council and CEG Land Promotions and was designated as one of the government's 14 garden villages sites in January 2017. Permission was given against concerns that the new homes would impact local amenities in Basildon and West Horndon.

== Buildings ==
Friern Manor, to the north of Lower Dunton Road, was built in the 18th century. It was owned by the governors of St Bartholomew's Hospital in the 19th century. During the 1930s it was owned by the parents of Holocaust denier David Irving. It is now used as a wedding venue.

Dunton Wayletts Farm is a Grade II listed building, a timber-framed and plastered farmhouse built in the 16th century, probably on the site of a much earlier building. It is now owned by the Highways Agency / Department for Transport.

Upper Dunton Hall (now Dunton Hall) and Lower Dunton Hall were owned by King's College, Cambridge. Dunton Hall was built in the 18th century and is a Grade II listed former farmhouse. The building was converted to a private dwelling following the closure of the farm.

The Old Rectory is a substantial Victorian house built in the mid-19th century which originally served as the rectory of St Mary's Church, until a new rectory was built in the 1930s. In 1934 the Old Rectory was bought by journalist Charles Leatherland, who lived there for fifteen years; when he received a life peerage in 1964, he took the title Baron Leatherland of Dunton. Charles Leatherland also bought the former Dunton School building. In 1987 the Old Rectory became a restaurant and is now used as a country house hotel and wedding venue.

Rose Cottage and Ivy Cottage are small 18th-century Grade II listed timber-framed and plastered cottages in Dunton Road, weatherboarded on the front.

Southfields Farm was an early 18th-century farmhouse. It was destroyed by fire in the early 1960s, and the land was bought by the Ford Motor Company as part of the site of their Dunton Technical Centre.

=== St Mary's Church ===
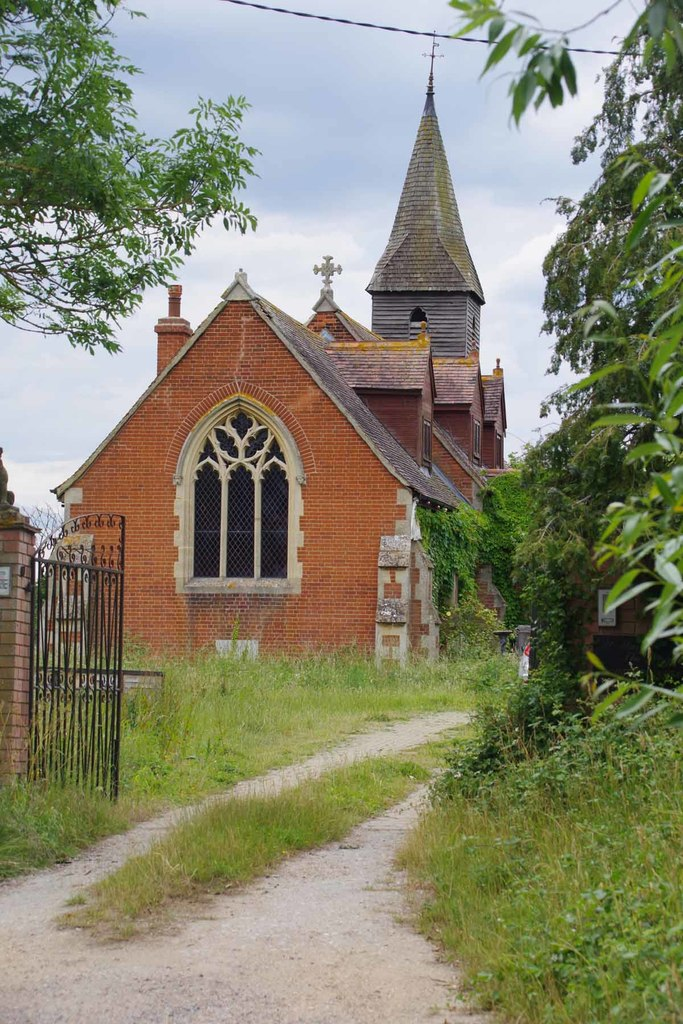
Former parish church of St Mary, now converted to a house

The parish church of St. Mary the Virgin has medieval origins. It was rebuilt in 1873 at a cost of £950, except for a part of the north wall of the chancel which is of 16th-century brick and a 15th-century truss. St Mary's stands on the site of a medieval church or priory. In 1923 the Royal Commission on the Historical Monuments of England cited evidence of its medieval origins including a 13th-century font, a 13th-century stone coffin in the churchyard, a cup dating from 1563, a date stone of 1686, a 17th-century table in the vestry, and a church bell dating from 1712.

By the 1950s St Mary's was in a poor structural condition caused by subsidence. The condition of the church had been causing concern for many years and in 1968 the Lay Commission on Churches advised it be pulled down. In 1978 the former Dunton parish was united with Laindon and the church closed to services and became a chapel of ease (a church building other than the main church). St Mary's was declared redundant in 1980.

After closure, the building and churchyard was left to the mercy of the elements and vandals. The Church Commissioners recommended it become a private residence, and the building was sold in 1985. Following the sale the church was restored for use as a private residence in the mid-1990s. There are still a few gravestones remaining from the former churchyard adjacent to the house.

St Nicholas Church in Laindon now serves the ecclesiastical parish of Laindon with Dunton.

=== Schools ===
Dunton's first known school was a dame school which opened in 1836. In 1843 a National School was built in Lower Dunton Road on a site granted by King's College, Cambridge. The school had two rooms to accommodate some fifty children. In 1929 Dunton School was sold by Essex County Council and became a private dwelling. During the Second World War, the Home Guard occupied the building.

After the war a new council school was built partly to accommodate the growing number of children from the new Dunton Plotlands estate. The school closed in 1977 due to declining attendance.

=== Dunton Poor Law labour colony ===
In 1904 the Poplar Board of Guardians acquired Sumpners Farm, Dunton as a 130-acre labour colony for 110 men who were transferred from Poplar Workhouse in East London. This was the first Poor Law labour colony in England. It closed in 1935.

== Dunton Plotlands ==
The Dunton Plotlands were smallholdings which became popular with East Enders moving out of London. Much of the Plotlands area was compulsorily purchased for the Southfields Industrial Estate. However a small part was saved and is now located within the Langdon Nature Reserve.

== See also ==
- Dunton Plotlands
- Dunton Technical Centre
