= Noak Bridge =

Civil parish in Essex, England

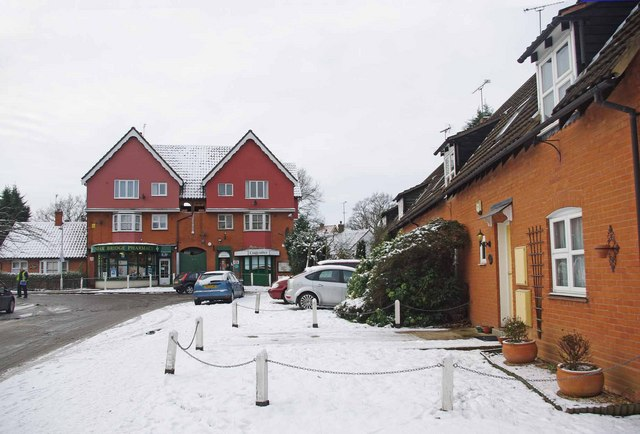

- Location within Essex
- Interactive map of Noak Bridge
- Population: 2,813 (Parish, 2021)
- OS grid reference: TQ694905
- District: Basildon
- Shire county: Essex
- Region: East
- Country: England
- Sovereign state: United Kingdom
- Post town: BASILDON
- Postcode district: SS15 4
- Dialling code: 01268
- Police: Essex
- Fire: Essex
- Ambulance: East of England
- UK Parliament: Billericay

Noak Bridge is a housing estate and civil parish on the northern edge of Basildon in the Borough of Basildon in Essex, England. At the 2021 census the parish had a population of 2,813.

The estate takes its name from the bridge over the River Crouch at the foot of nearby Noak Hill. Prior to its development most of the area was secondary woodland that had developed on the site of previous plotlands known as 'Central Park'. The continued use of South African street names in part of the area reflects the street names in the previous development. When people first moved into Noak Bridge the area was often popularly referred to as 'Wash Road', or the 'Wash Road Estate' after the road on its northern boundary, which in turn took its name from the 'wash' or ford that has now been replaced by a bridge just before the road's junction with Harding Elms Road.

Part of that secondary woodland survives as Noak Bridge Nature Reserve.

Noak Bridge is a rare example of a post-war, social housing estate that has been designated a Conservation Area . First planned in the 1970s as part of Basildon new town, Noak Bridge was separated from the rest of the town and it was decided that it should have the traditional character of an English village. The project architects were Maurice Naunton and George Garrard. Construction began in 1979 and within 3 years almost 400 rented dwellings had been built, including bungalows and sheltered housing, as well as a school, surgery, and shops. In terms of urban design, it as an early example of successful "place-making".

== School ==
The area's only primary school is the Noak Bridge Primary School. The school has approximately 250 pupils, from the pre-school on to year 6. The school opened in September 1982, but for the first half-term operated from the former Nevendon School site (now the ITEC centre) on the Burnt Mills Industrial Estate.

== Parish council ==
Noak Bridge has a parish council and collects a tax to meet local needs. The parish was created in 2002, having previously been an unparished area directly administered by Basildon Council.

== Village Hall ==
The Noak Bridge Village Hall serves a variety of community functions.

== Medical Centre ==
Noak Bridge Medical Centre serves those within the Noak Bridge, Noak Mead & Noak Park, Steeple View and Crays Hill areas.

== Shops ==
The area's two shops are a Pharmacy and a Post Office/Londis.

== Nature Reserve ==
The Noak Bridge Nature Reserve lies to the south east of the settlement and consists of twenty acres of meadow, scrub and woodland. It contains several ponds which attract a variety of amphibians and dragonflies.

The Reserve is the remains of the secondary woodland that covered much of the site before the estate was developed. This secondary woodland was notable for containing numerous garden species as well as pioneer woodland species such as hawthorn and oak.

== Listed Buildings ==
There are two grade II listed buildings recorded in the National Heritage List for England for Bowers Gifford and Noak Bridge.

| Name | Grade | Location | Type | Completed (Note: The date given is the date used by Historic England as significant for the initial building or that of an important part in the structure's description.) | Date designated | Grid ref. (Note: The grid reference is based on the British national grid reference system, sometimes known as OSGB36, used by the Ordnance Survey.) Geo-coordinates | Notes | Entry number (Note: The "List Entry Number" is a unique number assigned to each listed building and scheduled monument by Historic England.) | Image | Wikidata |
|---|---|---|---|---|---|---|---|---|---|---|
| Daniels Farm | II | Wash Road | | | 13 January 1988 | TQ7025791130; 51°35′36″N 0°27′24″E | | 1122212 | Upload Photo | Q26415354 |
| Laindonponds | II | Wash Road | | | 4 July 1955 | TQ7013891051; 51°35′33″N 0°27′17″E | | 1170968 | Upload Photo | Q26464680 |
