= Palace of Varieties =

Palace of Varieties was a British radio programme produced by the BBC and broadcast regularly on the Light Programme between 1937 and 1958.

The programme was devised by Bryan Michie and produced throughout its run by Ernest Longstaffe. The shows highlighted music hall performers, in the style of theatrical shows earlier in the century.

The programme consisted of five or six artistes, each singing a song with full verse and chorus. Then, at the end of the programme, they came back and sang the chorus of another popular song with which audiences could join in. There was usually a well-known "top of the bill" in every show, but Longstaffe preferred most of the programme to feature artistes who were normally featured lower on a variety bill and, in some cases, entertainers who had never broadcast before. Longstaffe found that these people often gave a more faithful reproduction of songs in the manner of the original music hall performers and were better suited to creating the atmosphere of an old-time theatre.

Artists who performed included Nellie Wallace, Randolph Sutton, G. H. Elliott and Hetty King, although most of those appearing were less prominent entertainers. The compere was always referred to as "Mr Will Tipple" or "Will Philpot". Initially, the shows were introduced by actor Bill Stephens; later chairmen included Nosmo King (Vernon Watson), Rob Currie, George Street, and Tod Slaughter. Longstaffe insisted that all the performers wore stage costume when broadcasting, and claimed that King George VI had told him that the programme was his personal favourite.

An LP, Palace of Varieties, with introductions by Longstaffe, was produced in the 1960s and reissued on CD in 2012.
