= Langdon Nature Reserve =

Nature reserve in Essex, England

Coordinates: 51.562°N 0.394°E

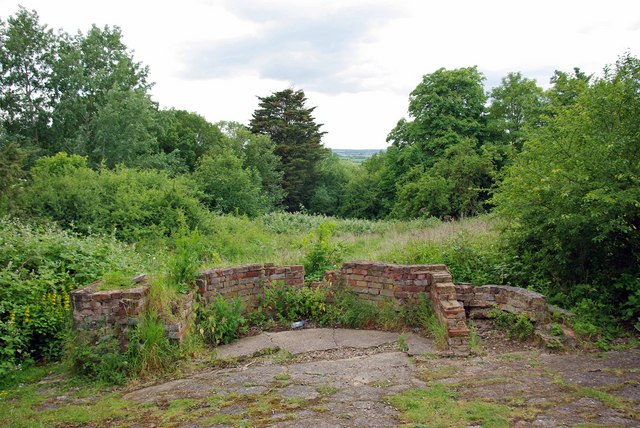
- Interactive map of Langdon Nature Reserve
- Type: Nature reserve
- Location: Basildon, Essex
- OS grid: TQ 660 875
- Area: 210 hectares (520 acres)
- Manager: Essex Wildlife Trust
- Designation: SSSI

Langdon Nature Reserve (also described as Langdon Nature Discovery Park) is a 210 hectare nature reserve west of Basildon in Essex. It is managed by the Essex Wildlife Trust, and forms part of the Langdon Ridge Site of Special Scientific Interest.

This site has a wildlife garden, woodland, meadows and lakes. Over 350 species of flowering plants have been recorded, and 30 butterflies including white admirals, green hairstreaks, marbled whites and grizzled skippers.

The site visitor centre is on Lower Dunton Road.

The site covers the area of Dunton Plotlands, inhabited from the 1930s to the 1980s by smallholders and weekend residents. The remains of small buildings are still present.
