= Laindon railway station =

Railway station in Essex, England

Laindon
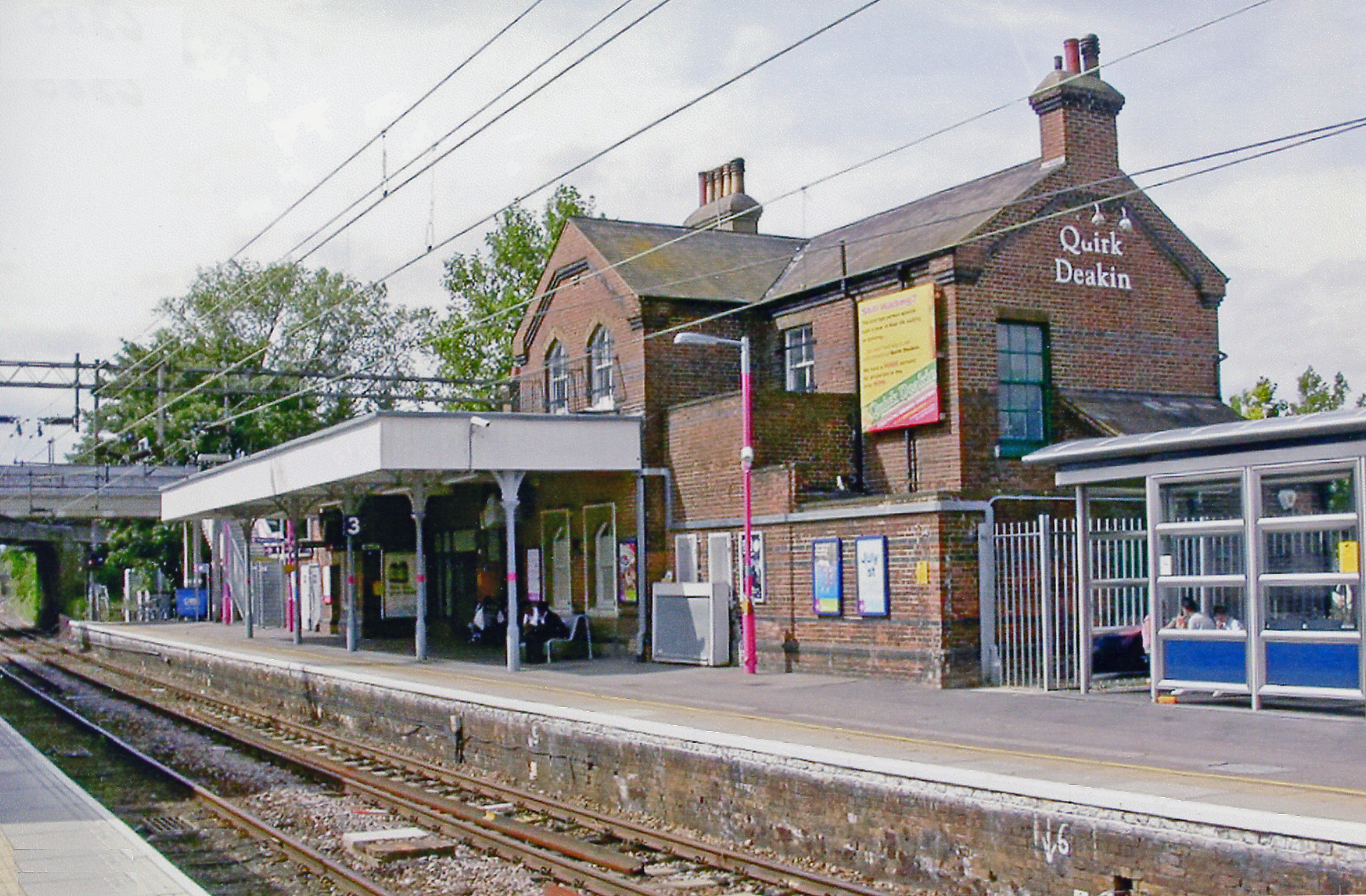

General information
- Location: Laindon, Borough of Basildon, Essex; England
- Coordinates: 51.5677°N 0.42358°E
- Grid reference: TQ680882
- Manager: c2c
- Platforms: 3

Other information
- Station code: LAI
- Classification: DfT category C2

History
- Opened: 1888
- Original company: London, Tilbury and Southend Railway
- Pre-grouping: Midland Railway
- Post-grouping: London, Midland and Scottish Railway

Passengers
- 2020/21: ▼0.711 million
- 2021/22: ▲1.445 million
- 2022/23: ▲1.749 million
- 2023/24: ▲1.812 million
- 2024/25: ▲1.927 million
Location
Notes
- Passenger statistics from the Office of Rail and Road

Laindon is a railway station on the London, Tilbury and Southend line, serving the town of Laindon in Essex, England. It is 22 miles 69 chains (36.8 km) down the main line from London Fenchurch Street and is situated between West Horndon to the west and Basildon to the east. Its three-letter station code is LAI. The station and all trains serving it are currently operated by c2c.

== History ==
=== Early Years (1888-1922) ===
As the population of the Southend area began to grow, the London Tilbury and Southend Railway (LT&SR) decided a more direct route was needed rather than their existing main line via Tilbury. The line opened in stages, with services to Upminster beginning on 1 May 1885, to East Horndon on 1 July 1886 and through to Laindon and Pitsea on 1 July 1888. Construction of the line east of Laindon at Dunton had been a problem, with the engineer Henry E Stilgoe commenting in 1891, "The men would come back in the morning and find the line had sunk by five feet".

At the time of opening, Laindon was quite remote from any notable centres of population, whilst the village was a small cluster of houses around a church. Development plots were laid out in the 1890s and by the early part of the following century Laindon was expanding. The early station had an up and down platform and a small goods yard was located east of the station. A goods shed was added later.

A storm on 1 August 1888 caused a temporary closure of the new line due to an embankment becoming unstable until reopening on 1 October.

In 1912, the LT&SR was bought by the Midland Railway who operated it throughout World War I and up to the grouping in 1923.

=== London Midland & Scottish Railway (1923-1947) ===
Following the Railways Act 1921 the station became the responsibility of the London Midland and Scottish (LMS) Railway from 1 January 1923.

The station was rebuilt in 1931 so that fast down services could overtake stopping services. This meant a third platform was added by making the up platform an island platform with tracks on both sides. Services using the middle platform could be terminated and sent back towards London as well.

From September 1939 to May 1945 passenger services were reduced as a result of World War II.

=== British Railways (1948-1994) ===
Following nationalisation of Britain's railways in 1948, the station transferred under British Railways to the London Midland Region. On 20 February 1949, the whole LTS line was transferred to the Eastern Region, yet despite the organisational changes, the old LTSR still was a distinctive system operated by former LTS and LMS steam locomotives until electrification.

During the late 1950s, the LTS was being electrified and resignalled. The infrastructure was changed at Laindon in two phases. Firstly, between 1957 and 1960 the middle platform became a reversing platform for trains terminating from Fenchurch Street and what was the Down Loop became the Down Main. After 1960 the middle platform became a platform where services from both directions could be reversed. Following the closure of the goods yard on 5 July 1962, the yard and connections were lifted sometime later in the decade.

A full electric timetable started operating in June 1967 which was primarily worked by Class 302 EMUs.

The LTS line and Laindon station became part of the London and South Eastern sector of British Rail in 1982, and in June 1986 this was rebranded as Network South East (NSE). With the Conservative government of the early 1990s looking to privatise the railways, the operation of the NSE passenger train service was put under the control of a Train Operating Unit.

=== The privatisation era (1994-2025) ===
On privatisation in 1994, infrastructure ownership passed to Railtrack and Prism Rail took over operations of the franchise, marketing the route as LTS Rail. Prism Rail were bought out by National Express in 2000 and in 2002 the line was rebranded as c2c.

Ownership of the infrastructure passed to Network Rail in 2002.

National Express sold the operation of the franchise to Trenitalia in 2017.

The station and all trains serving it are currently operated by c2c and are operated by Class 357 and Class 720/6 EMUs.

A more detailed history of the franchises can be found on the c2c page.

Private operation of the London, Tilbury and Southend line by Trenitalia c2c ceased on 20 July 2025, with the new publicly owned operator c2c taking over.

== Operations ==
=== Historic Services ===
Services started to Laindon when the station and line opened, but were not particularly good. The Tilbury route was still considered the busiest, and a small number of services were diverted via Laindon. As time went by and the area was developed so services improved. In December 1895, the Bradshaw's timetable guide shows seven down trains, the last of which will only stop if the guard is informed. There were seven up trains. On Sunday there were three up trains and four down services, the last being a request stop.

By the July 1922 edition of Bradshaw's Railway Guide, the timetable (the last operated by the Midland Railway) services had considerably improved and 17 weekday trains called with four fewer on Saturday.

In 1961, the last steam operated services from Fenchurch Street to Laindon took 50 minutes in the off-peak and there were two per hour.

The June 1962 off-peak service saw Laindon served by two trains per hour and taking 35 minutes to/from Fenchurch Street. Additional services ran in the morning peaks. All these services were operated by electric trains.

=== Goods services ===
Laindon station had a small goods yard which dealt with local traffic from opening to the goods yard closure in the sixties. Inward traffic would have included coal for domestic use, whilst outward traffic in the early years was agricultural in nature. The yard was closed on 5 July 1967.

=== Signal Boxes ===
A signal box was provided when the line was opened in 1881. This was replaced by the LMS in 1933 when the station was expanded with a new platform and rebuilding of the goods yard. In the modernisation of the mid-50s, the box was retained but provided with an electric panel. Closure came on 4 June 1995 when control passed to Upminster signalling centre.

== Services ==
Laindon is served by c2c trains westbound to Fenchurch Street in the City of London and eastbound to Shoeburyness in eastern Essex.

As of the June 2024 timetable the typical Monday to Friday off-peak service is:

- 4 tph (trains per hour) westbound to London Fenchurch Street (2 tph all stations and 2 tph semi-fast)
- 4 tph eastbound to Shoeburyness (2 tph all stations and 2 tph semi-fast)

Preceding station	National Rail	Following station
West Horndon	c2c London, Tilbury and Southend line	Basildon

== Cultural references ==
British actress Joan Sims (1930–2001), famous for her roles in the Carry On films, grew up in the station house at Laindon railway station where her father was the station master. A plaque in her memory can be seen near the entrance.
