= All Saints Church, Vange =

Coordinates: 51.5533°N 0.47236°E

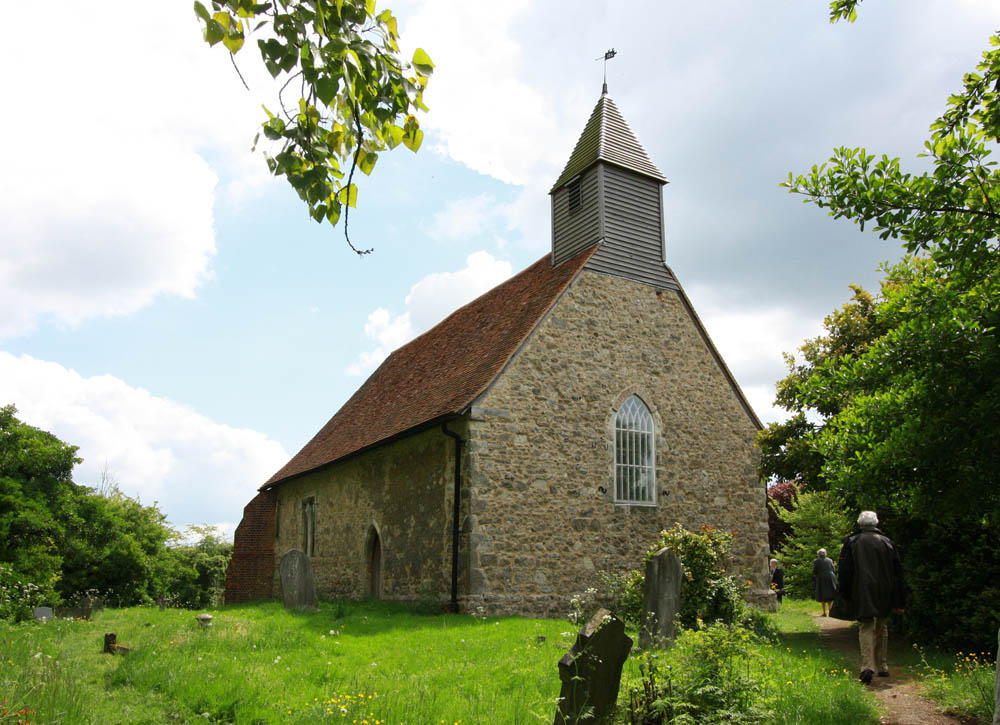
- All Saints Church, Vange

- Location in Essex
- OS grid reference: TQ 715 867
- Location: Vange, Basildon, Essex
- Country: England
- Denomination: Anglican
- Website: Churches Conservation Trust

Architecture
- Functional status: Redundant
- Heritage designation: Grade II*

Specifications
- Materials: Ragstone and flint Tiled roof.

All Saints Church is a redundant Anglican church in the former village of Vange, now part of the town of Basildon, Essex, England. It is recorded in the National Heritage List for England as a designated Grade II* listed building, and is under the care of the Churches Conservation Trust. The church stands to the south of the town of Basildon, just north of the A13 road.

== History ==
All Saints church in London Road, Vange, is thought to date from around 1328 and believed to be the oldest surviving church in Basildon, and additions have been made since that time. The last major change was in 1837 when the west wall was rebuilt and a gallery was added, In the late 1890s the church underwent a further restoration which was completed in May 1896. In 1890 the box pews were replaced by benches.

The interior, once lit by oil lamps, was later wired for light after electricity was installed to provide heating in 1931.

On 4 July 1955 the church, along with a number of others buildings in the Basildon area, became a listed building on the government departments' Ministry of Works list of buildings of historic interest. As of today it is now a designated a Grade II* listed building.

In the 1950s the population of Vange began to increase as the new housing estates of Basildon new town began to take shape. The location of the church, its size and condition were considered inadequate and a new church called St. Chad's was built in Timberlog Lane (now Clay Hill Road) which opened in 1958.

Services, though greatly reduced, did continue at All Saints, as did marriages and funeral services but by the 1990s it was evident that the church, if it was to survive would need to undergo important renovation work.

The last service was held in 1994 and All Saints of Vange was made redundant on 14 February 1996 and vested in the Churches Conservation Trust in January 2003. Repairs were necessary because the structure of the church had deteriorated over the years, and in more recent years it had been vandalised. These were undertaken in two phases. In the first phase, starting in April 2004, the building was stabilised and made weatherproof. The second phase has included repairs to the interior of the church, replacing doors and windows, dealing with cracks in the walls, rebuilding the stairway leading to the rood loft, conserving the wall paintings, repairing the nave ceiling and removing the chancel ceiling, and restoring the bellcote.

== Architecture ==
The church is constructed in ragstone and flint, with a tiled roof. Its plan is simple, consisting only of a nave and chancel, with a bellcote at the west end. The bellcote is constructed in timber, with weatherboarding and a shingled pyramidal roof. In the south wall of the nave are the remains of a Norman window, and a 15th-century door. In both the north and south walls of the nave are windows dating from the 15th century The 12th-century font consists of a square bowl supported by five columns, decorated with chevrons on one side. In the chancel are 17th-century wall monuments.

== Church Features. ==
Norman Chancel Arch.

When entering the chancel you are faced with the original 900 year old Chancel Arch, which has been heavily repaired over the centuries, with each generation leaving their mark. It measures 3.75 feet thick or 1.1 meters, above this repairs were done in the 13th and 14th centuries.

12th Century Font.

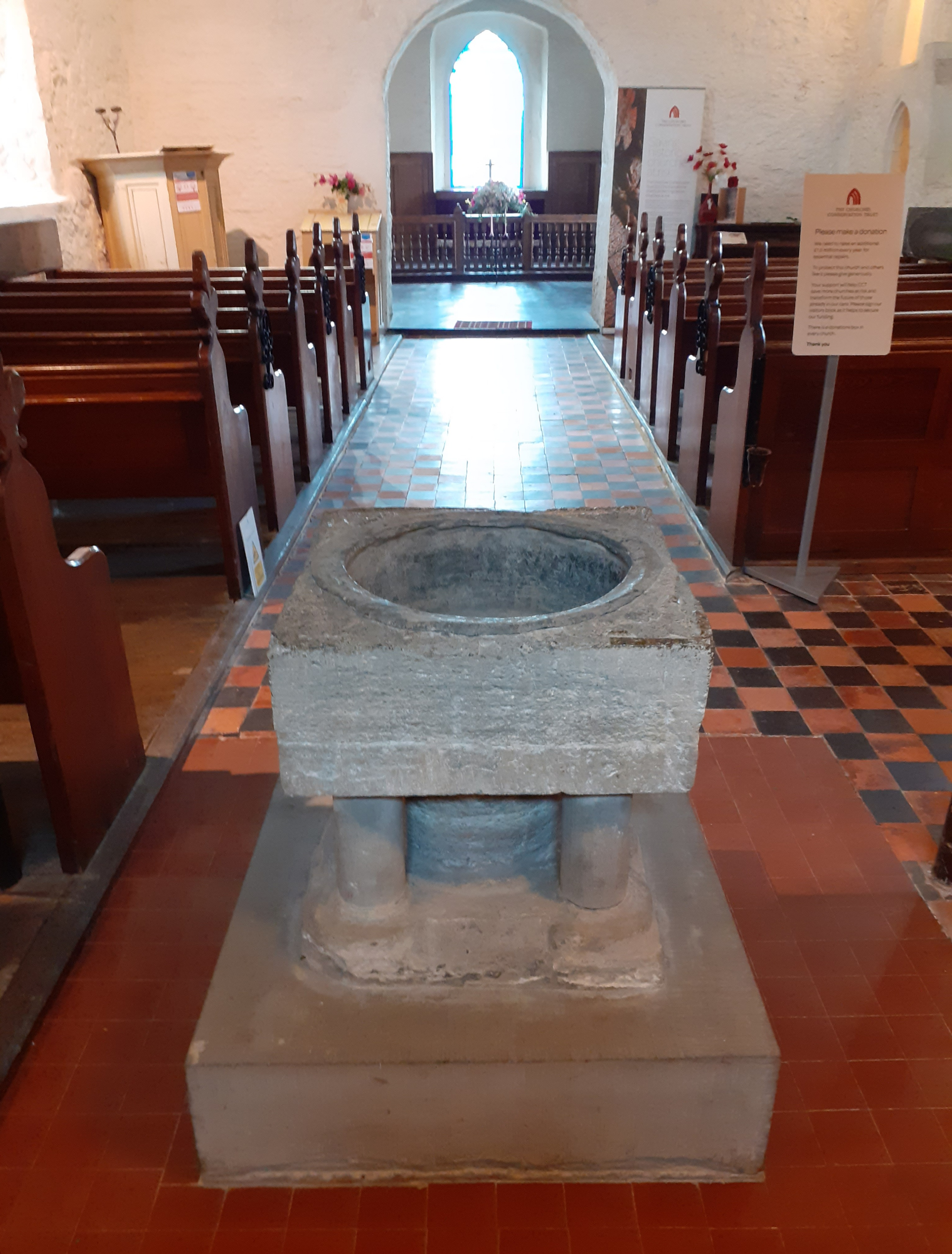
12th Century Marble Font

In the nave sits proudly a 12th century Font made of stone, in Purbeck Marble, the bowl is lead lined, with 17th century graffiti internally in the zig zag pattern known as Wigglework and externally in the v formations.

Rood Stairs.

The nave also has a rood set in the south wall, which has recently undergone restoration, the stone stairs would have originally had a screen set on the upper level, there may have also been flooring laid on the upper oak beams creating a loft space, the Rood screen was destroyed in the Reformation.

Medieval Last Judgement Painting.

In the chancel on the south wall a small section of medieval painting from the 13th century is still visible and was unearthed during restorations in 1904, the painting is of the Doom or the Last Judgement, from the Book of Revelation by John, being destroyed around 1540.

Memorials.

In the chancel, three fine plaques hang on the North wall, two dating to the 17th century and one in the early 19th century.+

== External features ==
The churchyard contains the war graves of five soldiers and two Royal Navy sailors of World War II.

== See also ==
- List of churches preserved by the Churches Conservation Trust in the East of England
