= Plotlands (land development) =

Plotlands were areas of cheap British farmland, including along the coast and rivers, which, between the 1890s and 1939, were divided and sold for holiday homes or as smallholdings. Described as "a makeshift world of shacks and shanties, scattered unevenly in plots of varying size and shape, with unmade roads and little in the way of services" plotland developments gave the economically disadvantaged the opportunity to "take their own place in the sun". Inhabitants were known as "plotlanders".

== History ==
The peak of plotland development was between the wars. Immediately after WWI there was a "dire shortage" of housing, so people used obsolete army huts, converted buses, caravans, railway carriages, coal barges, and kit-built wooden chalets to create "temporary shanties", taking advantage of the "depressed prices of agricultural land and the absence of planning controls."

In 1927 playwright H.F. Maltby (1880–1963) wrote a play What Might Happen: A Piece of Extravagance in 3 Acts satirising life in the plotlands where Maltby "imagined a future in which former aristocrats live in abject poverty in leaking railway carriages or former army huts."

Until at least 1939, most plotlands developed without services: no mains electricity, street lighting, water, sewage or tarmacked roads. During WWII, plotlands became popular as a place to shelter away from vulnerable cities, such as London, Liverpool, Bristol and Hull.

== Locations ==
Plotland locations included: Callow Green, Canvey Island, Hardwick Wood, Humberston Fitties, Isle of Sheppey, Jaywick Sands, Central Park, Peacehaven, Pitsea, Point Clear, Ram Hill, Rochester Park and Garden Suburb, Rye Bay, Selsey Peninsula, Saltdean, Shotgate, Vange Hill and Woodingdean.

People from the West Midlands would travel to the Severn Valley and North Wales, those from Glasgow would go to the Ayrshire coast, and those from West Riding cities would travel to the Yorkshire coast and the Humber estuary.

== Preservation and future ==
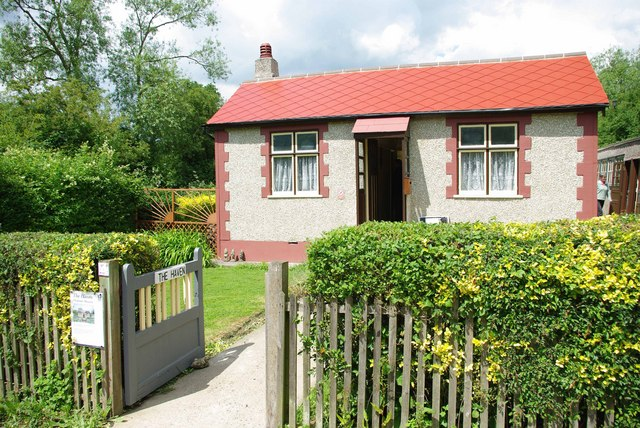
The Haven, Dunton Plotlands Museum

The Haven Plotlands Museum in Basildon is a plotland house now owned by the Essex Wildlife Trust.

The Humberston Fitties plotlands in Lincolnshire were declared a conservation area in 2017.

The York Plotlands Association is "campaigning to update the model of plotland development which was (more or less) outlawed by the 1947 Planning Act" for people planning to build their own homes on their own plot.

== Gallery ==
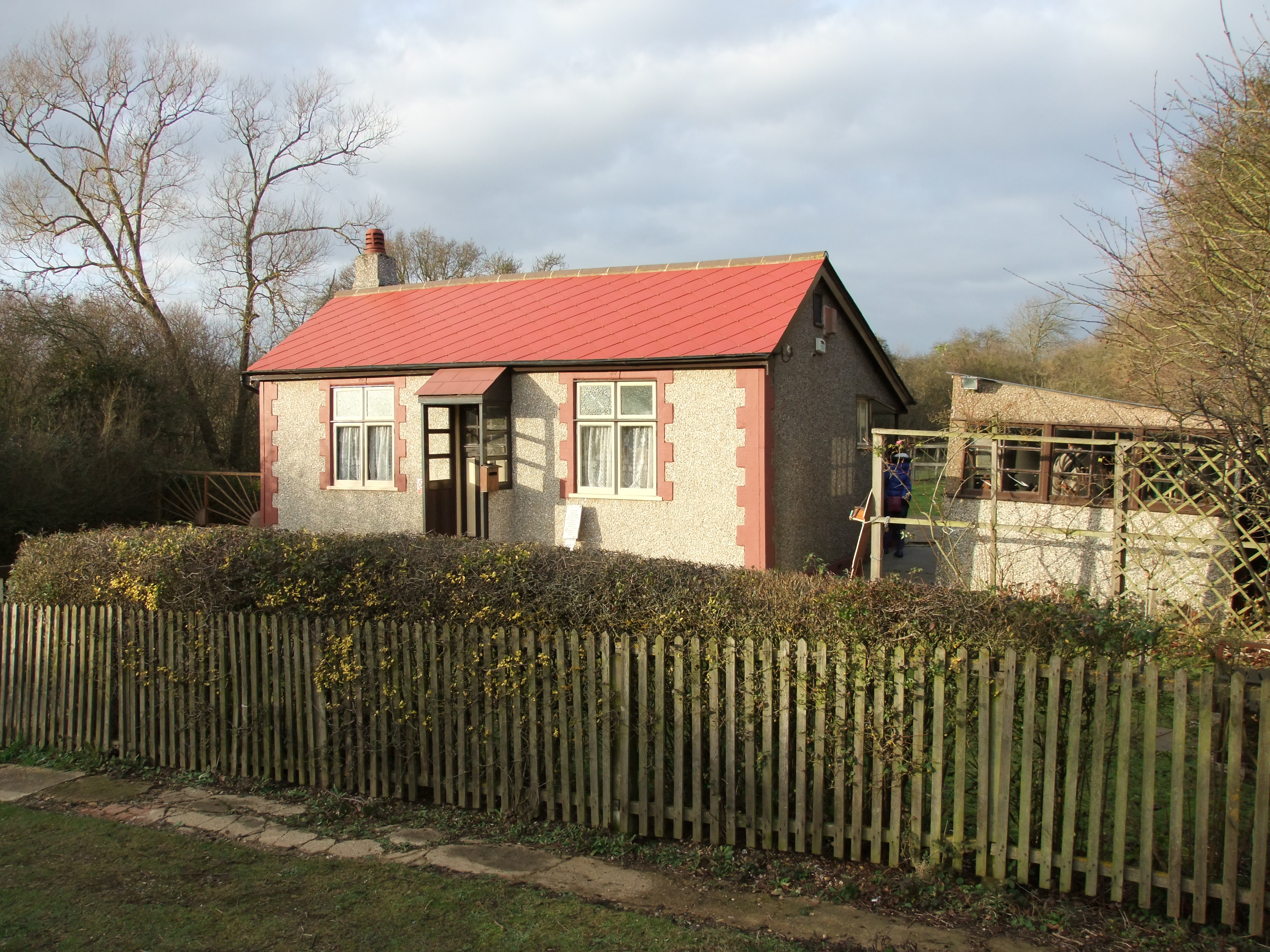
The Haven Dunton Plotlands Museum

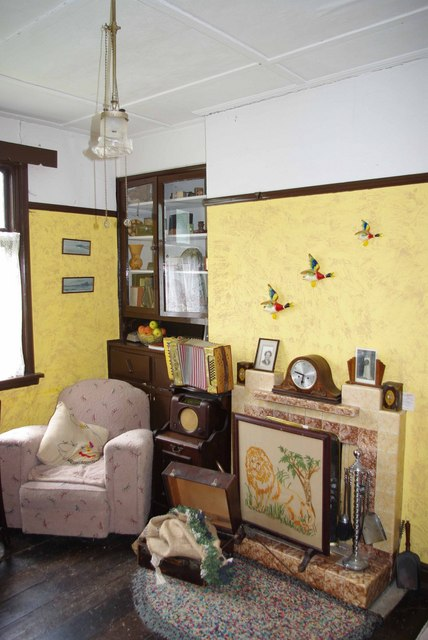
Inside The Haven, Dunton Plotlands Museum

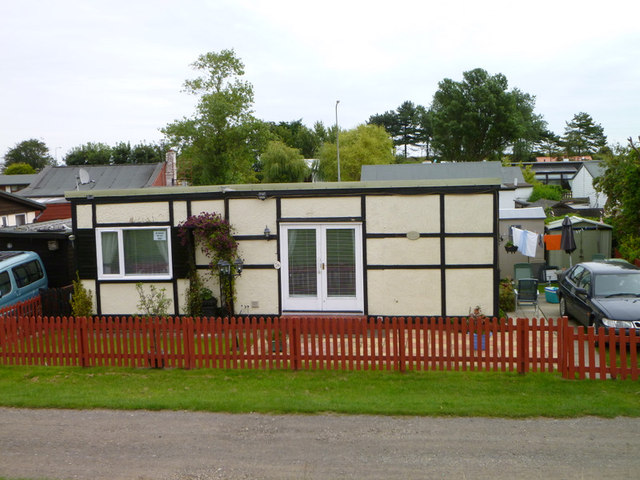
Humberston Fitties, Lincolnshire

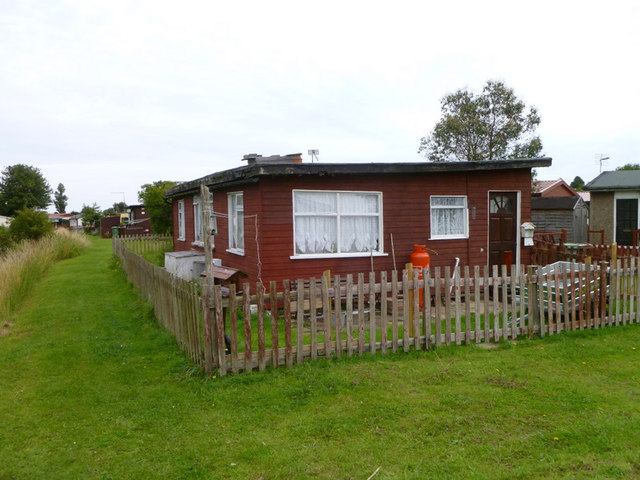
Humberston Fitties, Lincolnshire

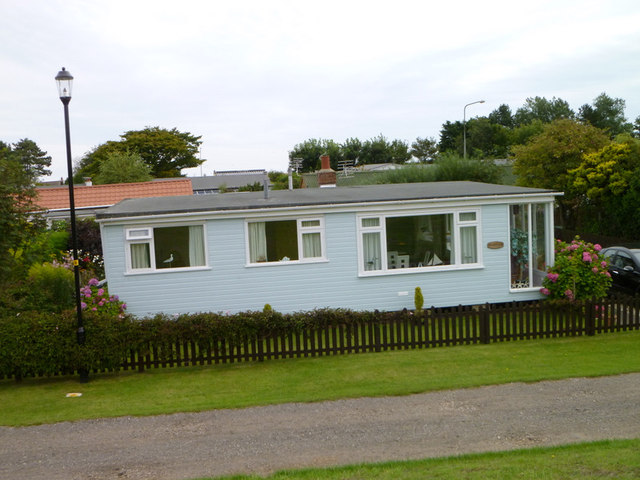
Humberston Fitties, Lincolnshire

== See also ==
- Dowling, A (2023). Humberston Fitties: The Story of a Lincolnshire Plotland. London, UK: Independent Publishing Network. ISBN 9781803527321.
- Hardy, Dennis (2004). Arcadia for All: The Legacy of a makeshift landscape. Nottingham, UK: Five Leaves. ISBN 9780907123590.
