= Church of St Margaret, Bowers Gifford =

Church in Essex, England

Church of St Margaret
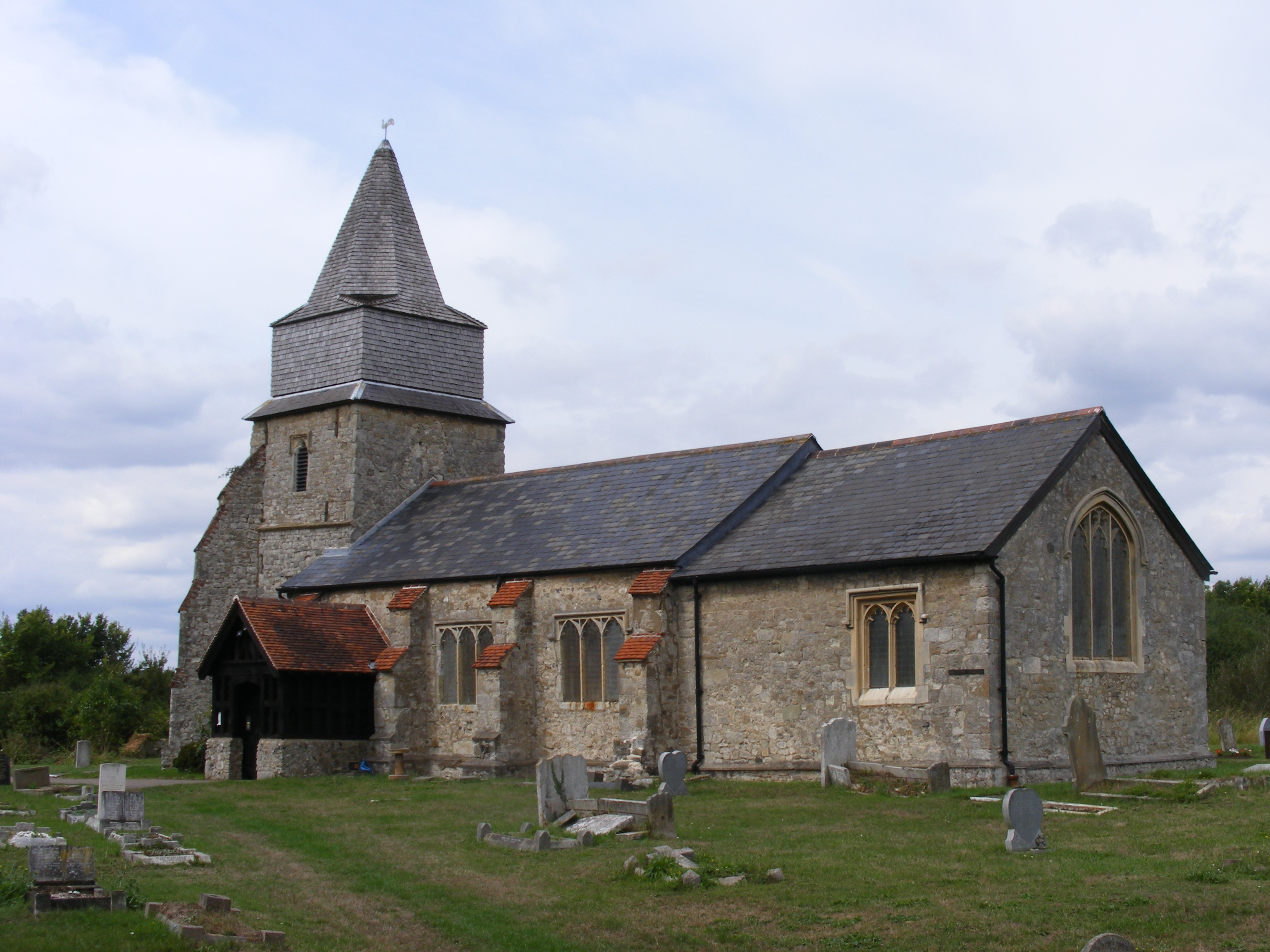
- Church of St Margaret
- 51.556828°N 00.531563°E
- Denomination: Church of England
- Website: St Margaret's Church

History
- Founded: 1350
- Founder: Sir John Giffard
- Dedication: Margaret the Virgin
- Dedicated: 27 December 1292

Architecture
- Functional status: Parish church
- Heritage designation: Grade II*
- Designated: 4 July 1955

Administration
- Diocese: Chelmsford
- Parish: Bowers Gifford with North Benfleet

The Church of St Margaret is a 14th-century grade II* listed church near Bowers Gifford, Essex. As is common with many Essex churches, it features a wooden bell-cot surmounting a stone tower.

== Location ==
The church is two miles east of Basildon in south Essex, separated from the River Thames by Canvey Island. Originally the church served a remote village surrounded by estuary marshes; as a result of this, the church sits 10 meters above sea level.

== History ==
In 1086, the Domesday Book stated Bowers Gifford had four landholders, four ploughs, and sheep. A wooden Saxon church stood at that time.

St Margaret's Church dates back to 1350 and was built by the Gifford family; the church is dedicated to Margaret of Antioch.

== Architecture ==
St Margaret is built in the Perpendicular style, consisting of a chancel and nave, south porch, and western tower. The church is built from Kentish ragstone rubble, with flint and Roman brick, the dressings are in reigate stone, and the roofs covered in slate.

The west tower is from the early 16th century, and was built in two stages. Surmounted by a timber superstructure, the low octagonal spire was added in the Tudor period and is clad in cedar wooden shingles.

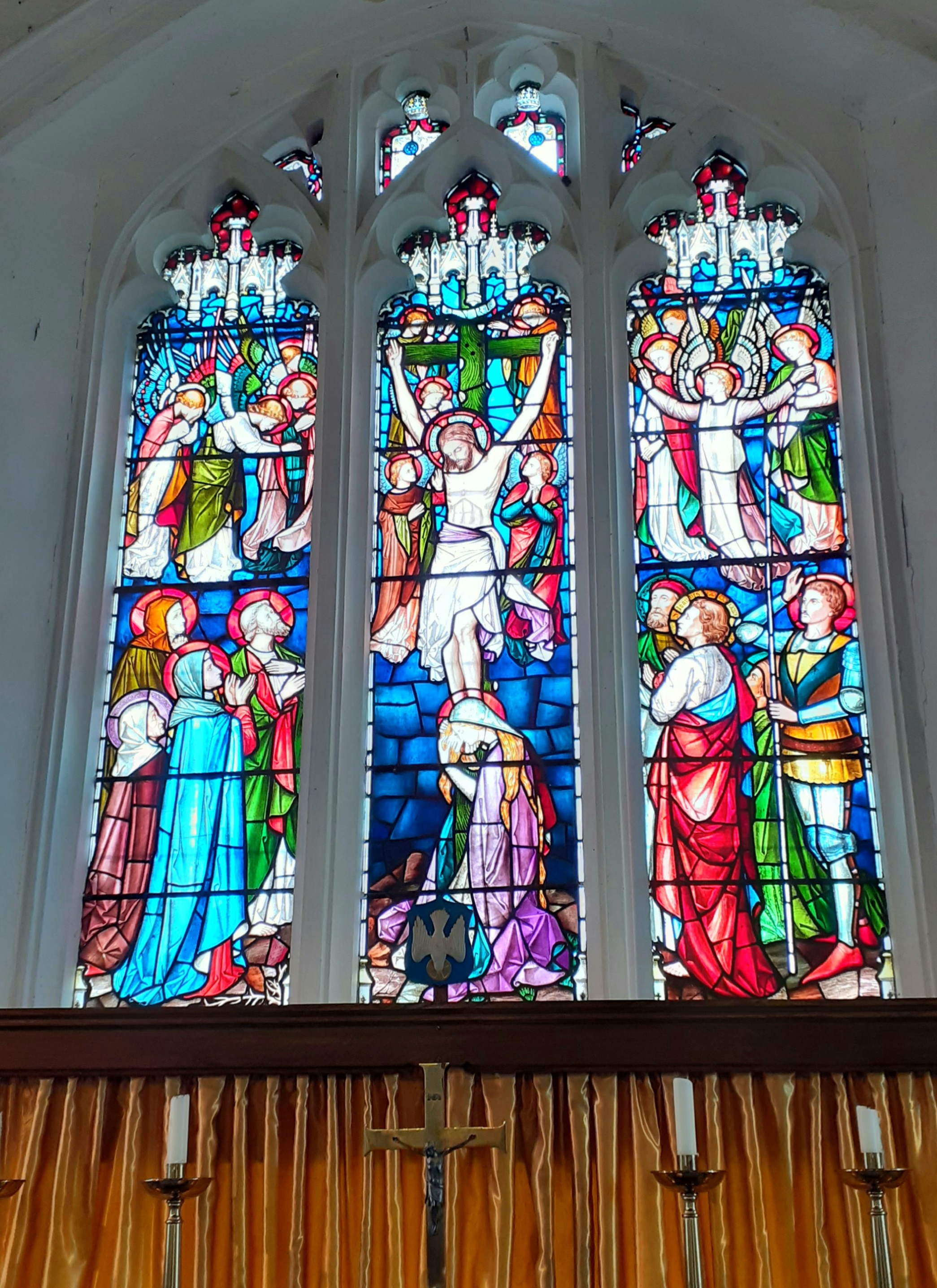
East window of St Margaret

The west tower has three bells, which can be reached by climbing 25 steps. The bells themselves date to 1380 by William Burford, and are inscribed "Sit Nomen Domini Benedictum", the second bell dated 1400 by Robert Burford is inscribed "Sancta Katerina Ora Pro Nobis", and are some of the oldest in Essex, and are still rung regularly.

=== Sir John Giffard monumental brass ===
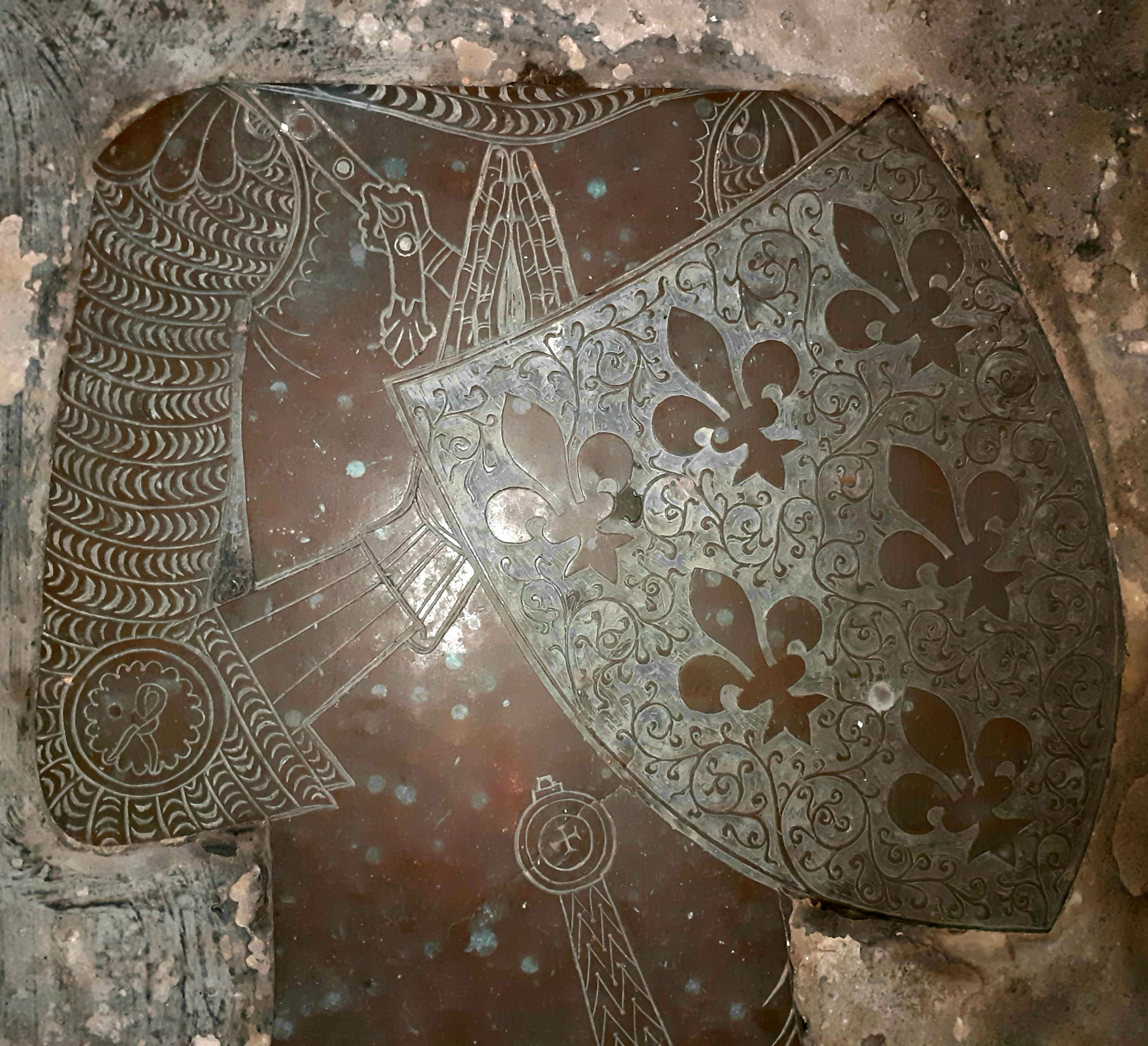
Brass monument for Sir John Giffard

Along the north wall of the chancel lies the monumental brass effigy of Sir John Giffard, who died in 1348. The brass effigy is life-size, at around 6 feet long.

After around 1740, the brass went missing from the church and was not found until 1855. The rector of the church informed H.W. King of the Essex Archaeological Society of its location in the possession of Major Spitty of Billericay, who returned it. It was noted as being in a "mutilated condition."

The brass was replaced in the church, restored, and remounted on a new slab in 1855. However, by 1898 the monument had become loose, and one leg had detached in two pieces. The Essex Archaeological Society donated three guineas, along with local donations, to a second restoration, which was carried out by Henry Young from Herongate.

== Present day worship and use ==
St Margaret's is an Anglican church and is open for a weekly service every Sunday at 9 am. The church also holds ceremonies for weddings, baptisms and funerals. The church is notable for its surrounding fields and marshland and its adjacency to the main C2C railway line to London.
