= Bowers Gifford =

Village in Essex, England

Coordinates: 51.56°N 00.52°E

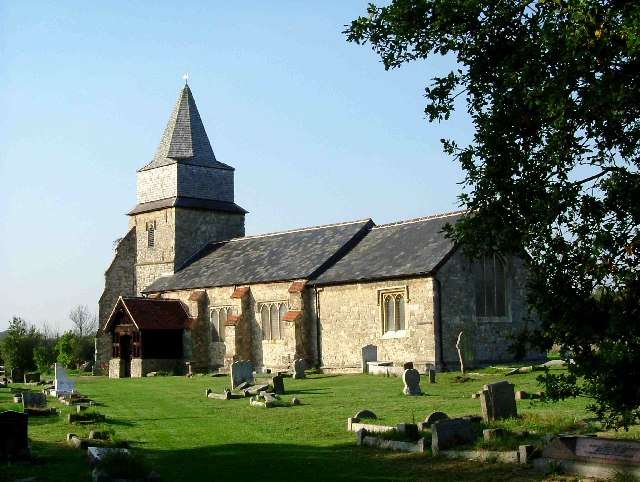
- St Margaret's church

- Location within Essex
- OS grid reference: TQ7588
- Civil parish: Bowers Gifford and North Benfleet
- District: Basildon
- Shire county: Essex
- Region: East
- Country: England
- Sovereign state: United Kingdom
- Post town: BASILDON
- Postcode district: SS13
- Police: Essex
- Fire: Essex
- Ambulance: East of England

Bowers Gifford is a village in the civil parish of Bowers Gifford and North Benfleet, located in the Borough of Basildon within the county of Essex, England. It is located to the east of Pitsea and to the west of South Benfleet.

== Toponymy ==
The place-name 'Bowers Gifford' is first attested in the Domesday Book of 1086, where it appears as Bura, meaning 'cottages', from the Old English bur, in modern English bower. The 'Gifford' element relates to its lords of the manor.

The village has been known by other various names: Bures; Bures Tany; Bures iuxta Magna Bemflete; Bures by Pithesey; Buris; Burisgiffard; Burys; Bowers; Borys; Bewars.

== History ==
Before the Norman Conquest the land was owned by Westminster Abbey, but by the Domesday Book of 1086 it was under the control of three tenants: the abbey, Ralph Peverell, Walter the Deacon and Lord Grim the Reeve. It was reported that the population was a total of 16 households.

By Letters Patent of Edward I, the King granted to Robert Giffard the manor at Bowers, for which Robert released to the King all his claim on the Hundred of Barstable which he had by the gift of William Giffard, his father, and Gundreda, his mother.

Gundreda must have been the heiress of the family of Sutton, who had held Bowers by the curious service of scalding the King's hogs, as Robert de Sutton is recorded in Testa de Nevill of 1212 to be the owner of both Bowers Manor, and the Hundred of Barstable.

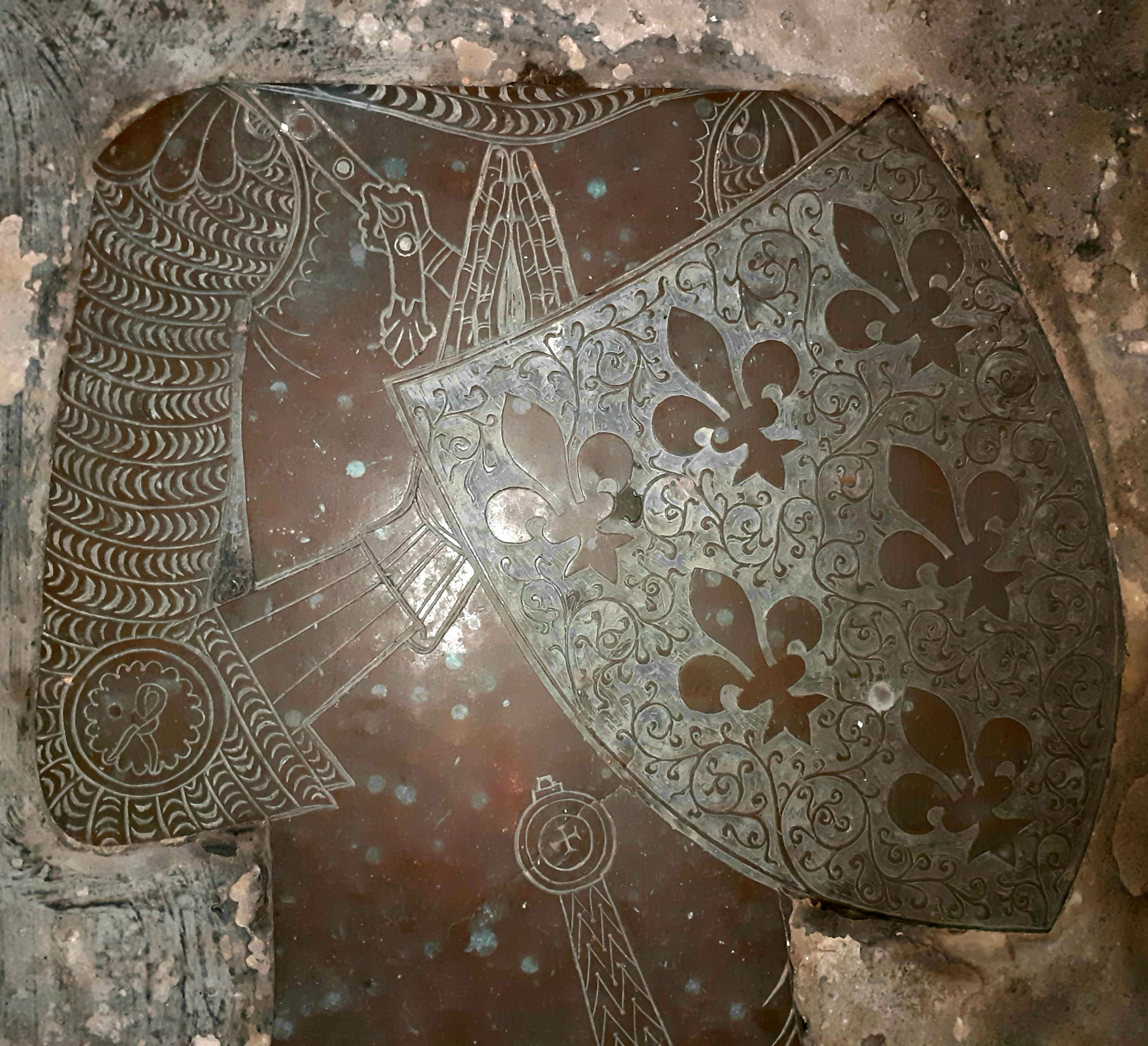
Monumental brass plaque in honour of Sir John Giffard, located with St Margaret's Church

The most historic surviving building is the fourteenth-century Church of St Margaret, which has been Grade II* listed since 1955. The church contains a monumental brass of Sir John Giffard, only one of three such brasses of Edward III's knights known to exist. Sir John Giffard had served Edward III in his campaign in France at the Battle of Crécy in 1346 and the Siege of Calais in 1347, only to die on the 12 March 1348. The Brass was removed when the church was rebuilt in the 19th century, saved by a churchwarden who used it to repair his shelf at home. He later passed it to a resident of Billericay, who returned it back to the church after its rebuilding and it was placed back on the North side.

The only other listed building in Bowers Gifford is Saddlers Hall Farmhouse, which was built in the 18th century by the Spitty family, large landowners in Essex, and listed as Grade II in 1975. Nikolaus Pevsner in his architectural journey of Essex mentions both St. Margaret's Church and the village's former school built originally in 1846 on the London Road. Bowers Marshes, which stretch beyond St Margaret's Church once were home to several farms, that came off the track known as Manor Way, however only Great Mussels has survived.

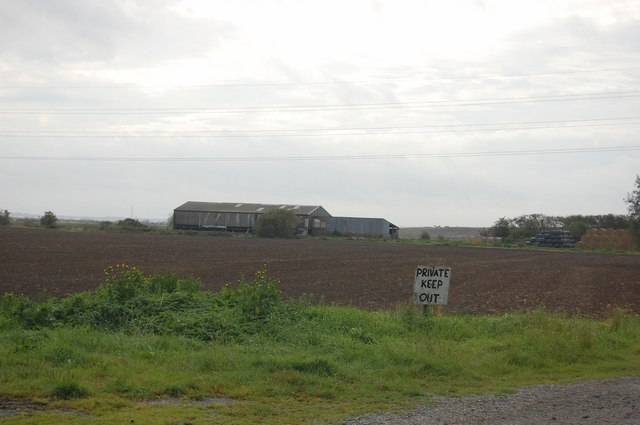
Great Mussels

During World War I, the village was home to North Benfleet Airfield, with the emergency landing site located between Saddlers and Bowers Hall's. The airstrip opened in 1916, and its first recorded usage was in September 1917 when Sutton Farm Squadron no.78 were sent to intercept eleven Gotha bombers that were flying to attack London. Lieutenant J.S. Castle and Airmen First Class H Daws flying a Sopwith 1½ Strutter had engine problems and performed an emergency landing at Bowers. By 1919 the Air Ministry returned the land back to its owners but the site was once again used in 1936 as the host for the British Air Display. Pillboxes in the surrounding fields testify to its World War II wartime role in defending the Thames Estuary which it overlooks.

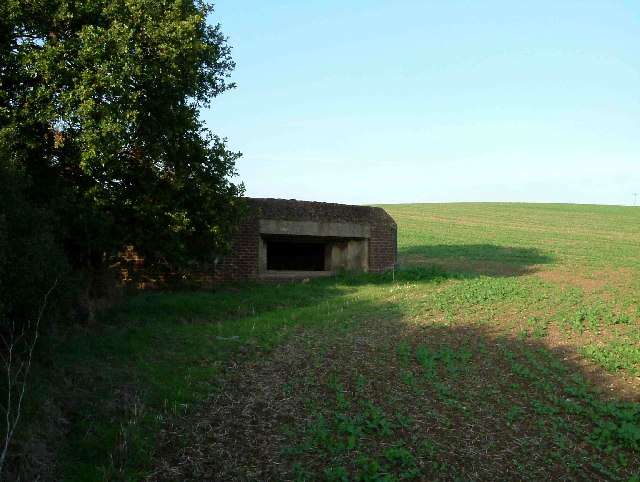
Gun Emplacement near Bowers Hall

In 1924, Gifford House was built to serve as the residency for the Rector of Bowers Gifford, John Shaw Bryers. The house was used as a military hospital during World War II, before being compulsorily purchased by the Basildon Development Corporation in 1949, to be used as their headquarters. It was continued to be used by the corporation's successor, the Commission for New Towns from 1984 until its closure in 1995. The building was demolished in 2002 to make way for Gifford House Care Home. The previous Rectory building still stands in Church Road, next to Basildon Crematorium, and was first shown on a map in 1777. The building is currently used as offices, and although not listed, English Heritage called it a undesignated heritage asset while Essex County Council said Externally, the building is architecturally important at a local and regional level when the building was under threat of demolition in 2015. The site includes a moat which council historians have dated at between 1086 and 1539. At Bowers Hall there is part of a medieval moat.

A landmark in Bowers Gifford is the Gun Pub, from which the hill on which it stands takes its name.

Bowers Gifford was once home to Bowers Gifford Golf Course, which had an official address of Earlsfee Hall, Bowers Gifford. The course was closed during World War II, with hay bales placed across the site to stop the Luftwaffe landing planes on the site. However it did not reopen like nearby Boyce Hill after the war, and there is little trace of the course left.

In 2013, developers Merdian Strategic Land put forward plans to build 750 homes, a new primary school and shops at Little Chalvedon Hall, on behalf of Nottinghamshire County Council who had purchased the land for £4.2 million. Basildon Council rejected the plans, and the developers appealed, with a planning appeal in 2014 upholding the Council's decision.

== Governance ==
Bowers Gifford was an ancient parish in the Barstable Hundred of Essex. The parish included an exclave on Canvey Island until 1880, when the island was made its own civil parish. The parish was included in the Billericay poor law union in 1835. It therefore became part of the Billericay rural sanitary district in 1872, which was reconstituted as the Billericay Rural District when elected parish and district councils were created in 1894.

In 1934 most of the rural district, including Bowers Gifford, was converted into the Billericay Urban District. The parishes within it were then classed as urban parishes and so became ineligible to have their own parish councils. All the civil parishes within the urban district were merged into a single parish called Billericay in 1937. At the 1931 census (the last before the abolition of the civil parish), Bowers Gifford had a population of 468. The urban district was renamed Basildon in 1955 and was reformed to become the modern Basildon district in 1974, at which point the district also became an unparished area.

The modern civil parish of Bowers Gifford and North Benfleet was created on 1 April 2010 from part of the unparished area following a community governance review.

== Notable people ==
- Sir Thomas Raymond - British judge 1626–1683
