= Basildon Urban District =

Former local government area in the UK

Coordinates: 51.57°N 0.47°E

Basildon (Billericay from 1934 to 1955)
- Area
  - 1951: 27,139 acres (110 km²)
  - 1961: 27,139 acres (110 km²)
- Population
  - 1931: 27,454 (equivalent area)
  - 1971: 129,302
- History
  - Created: 1934
  - Abolished: 1974
  - Succeeded by: Basildon
- Status: Urban district

Basildon Urban District (from 1934 to 1955 Billericay Urban District) was a local government district in south Essex, England, from 1934 to 1974.

The district was created in 1934 from the following parishes (all from Billericay Rural District):

- Basildon
- Bowers Gifford
- Great Burstead
- Laindon
- Lee Chapel
- Little Burstead
- Nevendon
- North Benfleet
- Pitsea
- Vange
- Wickford

It also gained 1,282 acres (5 km^{2}) from Chelmsford Rural District and 1,627 acres (7 km^{2}) from Orsett Rural District.

In 1937 all the parishes were abolished and used to create a Billericay parish which covered the same area as the district. In 1955 the district was renamed Basildon, still consisting of the Billericay parish.

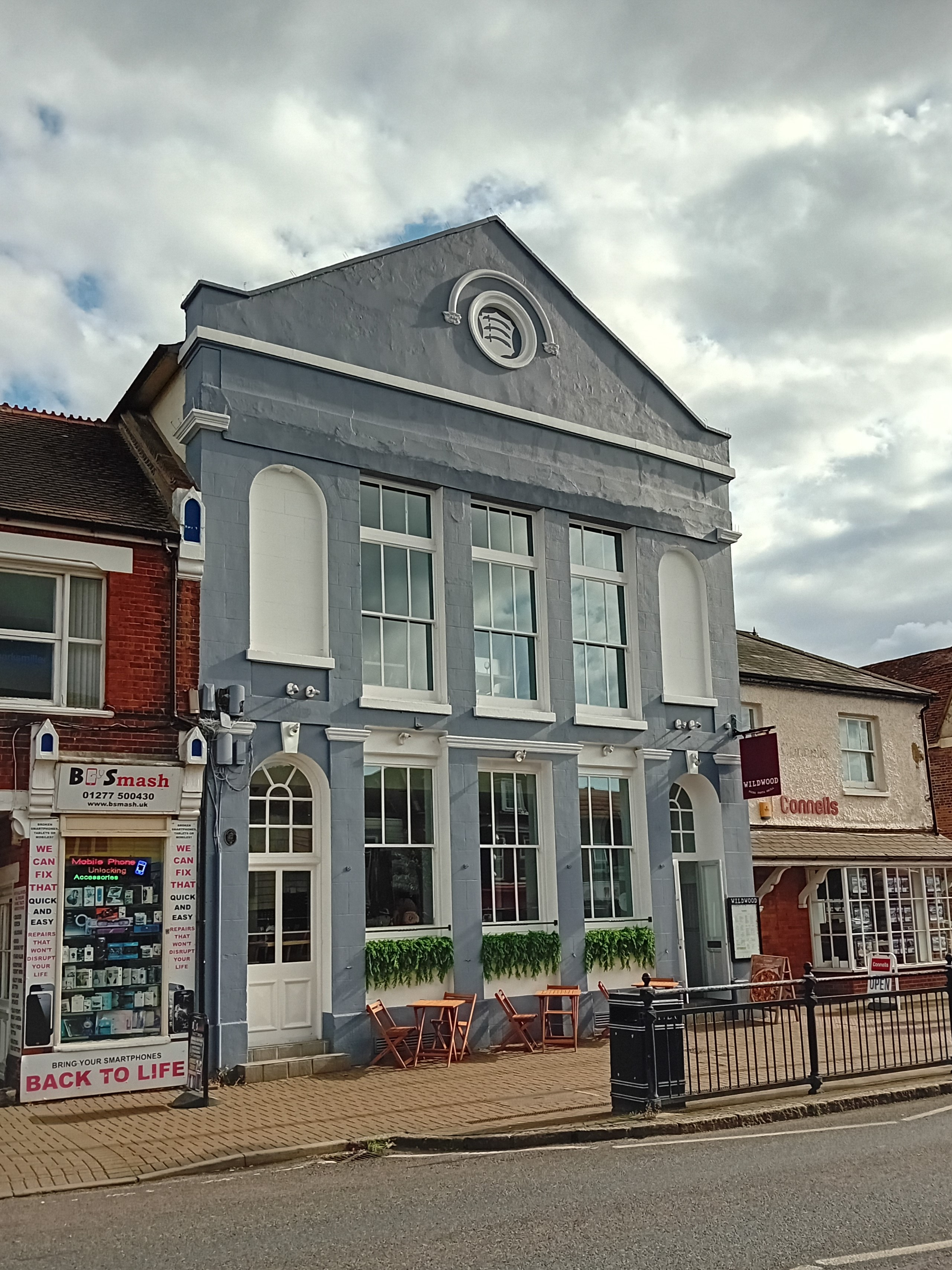
Old Town Hall, Billericay

From 1938 until the early 1960s the urban district council met at the Town Hall at 94 High Street in Billericay and had its main offices nearby, notably at 98 High Street. In the early 1960s the council moved to premises in the new town centre of Basildon.
