= Laindon =

Suburban town in Essex, England

Coordinates: 51.574°N 0.4181°E

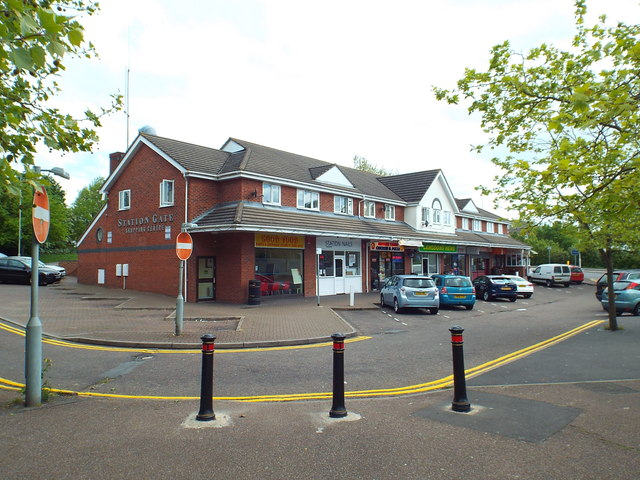
- Station Gate shops

- Location within Essex
- OS grid reference: TQ676888
  - London: 25 miles (40 km)
- District: Borough of Basildon
- Shire county: Essex
- Region: East
- Country: England
- Sovereign state: United Kingdom
- Post town: BASILDON
- Postcode district: SS15
- Dialling code: 01268
- Police: Essex
- Fire: Essex
- Ambulance: East of England
- UK Parliament: Basildon and Billericay

Laindon is a suburban town forming the western part of Basildon, in Essex, England. It was historically a separate village and parish. In 1949, the village was included in the designated area for the new town of Basildon, since when the area has been extensively developed; Laindon now forms part of the Basildon built-up area.

== History ==
The name Laindon is thought to mean the hill (dun in Old English) by the Lyge, an old name for one of the streams in the area, which is a tributary of the River Crouch.

In Saxon times, Laindon appears to have formed an extensive territory which covered both Laindon itself and Langdon Hills to the south, which was historically also known as Laindon Hills.

Laindon appears in the Domesday Book of 1086, when there were two estates or manors in a vill listed as Legenduna or Leienduna. Both manors were held by the Bishop of London at that time. Langdon Hills was by then a separate manor, listed as Langenduna. Another small manor called Lee adjoined Laindon and Langdon Hills.

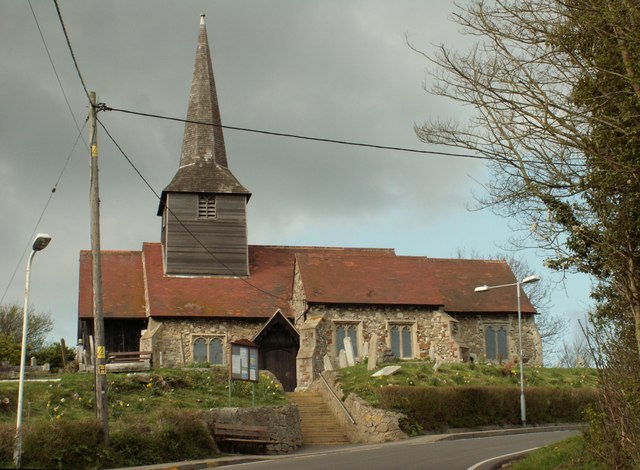
St Nicholas' Church

No priest or church is mentioned in Domesday Book at Laindon, but it became a parish. A church is known to have existed at Laindon in Norman times. The church, dedicated to St Nicholas, was largely rebuilt in the 14th century, although it retains some earlier material. The church stands on a prominent hilltop site.

The ancient parish of Laindon also included the small settlement of Basildon, which had its own chapel of ease from at least the 14th century. Civil functions under the poor laws from the 17th century onwards were administered separately for the chapelry of Basildon and the rest of Laindon parish, and so Basildon became a separate civil parish in 1866 when the legal definition of 'parish' was changed to be the areas used for administering the poor laws.

Another chapel of ease known as Lee Chapel was built to the south of Laindon; it is known to have existed by the 14th century and its chapelry came to be an extra-parochial area, removed from the parish of Laindon to lie outside any parish. The chapel at Lee Chapel had been demolished by the 19th century, but it remained an extra-parochial area until such areas were converted into civil parishes in 1858.

The parish of Laindon historically included two detached pieces of coastal grazing land, one of which was on Canvey Island; the island was made a separate parish in 1880. Laindon parish also included a long salient extending to the north between the neighbouring parishes of Great Burstead and Little Burstead, which included Laindon Common, Frith Wood and Noak Hill.

The London, Tilbury and Southend Railway's original main line built in the 1850s took a southerly route which stayed close to the Thames Estuary coast. In the 1880s the company built a shorter inland route, deviating from the older line at Barking and rejoining it at Pitsea. The new route passed to the south of suburb and Laindon railway station opened on the completion of the new route in 1888. The station was just outside the parish of Laindon, lying in a salient of Little Burstead parish which wrapped around the western and southern side of Laindon. The station was also close to the boundary with the parishes of Langdon Hills, Lee Chapel and Dunton Wayletts.

The area around Laindon station was then developed as plotlands in the late 19th and early 20th century, with extensive plotlands development taking place in the 1920s and 1930s. People bought individual plots on which to build a house, but there was very little provision of infrastructure and many of the houses were of a poor quality. In 1891, just after the arrival of the railway, Laindon parish had a population of 304. By 1911, the population had grown to 738 and to 4,552 by 1931.

When elected parish and district councils were established in 1894, Laindon and neighbouring Lee Chapel were both included in the Billericay Rural District. Most of the rural district, including Laindon and Lee Chapel, was converted into the Billericay Urban District in 1934, and the parishes within the urban district were united into a single parish called Billericay in 1937.

In 1949, Laindon was included in the designated area for the new town of Basildon. Billericay Urban District was renamed Basildon Urban District in 1955 and was reformed to become the modern Basildon district in 1974.

The Five Links Estate was built in the late 1960s and early 1970s, on land between the High Road and central Basildon. The housing is built in a distinctive pattern around pedestrian courtyards. Basildon Council are currently regenerating this area with the aim of reducing crime, and renaming some streets.

Since 2020, Laindon town centre has undergone modernisation, with 224 homes and 16 shops planned, including several flats.

== Geography ==
The area south of the station and railway line are called Langdon Hills; with Laindon, it forms part of the Basildon post town. To the south-west of Laindon, the Dunton Plotlands was an area of small plots of land used as weekend cottages or smallholdings during the mid-20th century.

== Transport ==
The town is served by Laindon railway station, which is a stop on the London, Tilbury and Southend line. c2c operates regular services between London Fenchurch Street, Basildon, Southend Central and Shoeburyness.

Local bus services are operated by First Essex and NIBS Buses; routes connect the area with Basildon, Billericay, Brentwood, Langdon Hills and Shotgate.

== Notable people ==
- Josh Dubovie (born 1990), singer
- John Georgiadis (1939–2021), violinist and conductor
- Edgar Longstaffe (1852–1933), landscape painter
- Joan Sims (1930–2001), comedy actress.
