= Lower Thames Crossing =

Approved road crossing of the River Thames

- Rendering of the southern portal of the tunnel at Gravesend
- Interactive map of Lower Thames Crossing

Overview
- Location: Kent, Essex
- Coordinates: 51.4492°N 0.4147°E
- Status: Under construction
- Route: A122
- Crosses: River Thames
- Start: Tilbury
- End: Gravesend

Operation
- Work began: March 2026
- Owner: Department for Transport

Technical
- Length: Road: 14.3 miles (23.0 km); Tunnel: 2.6 miles (4.2 km)
- No. of lanes: 3 in each direction
- Width: 54 feet (16.5 m)
- Depth below water: 213 feet (65 m)

The Lower Thames Crossing is a road crossing of the Thames estuary downstream of the Dartford Crossing currently being constructed. When completed, it will link the English counties of Kent and Essex, connecting the districts of Thurrock and Gravesham, supplementing the Dartford route.

First proposed in the late 2000s, the crossing is designed to relieve the pressure on the existing A282 Dartford Crossing. The proposed 23 kilometres (14 mi) route would connect the M25 motorway and A13 north of the river to the M2 motorway south of the river. When built, the crossing would have the longest road tunnel in the UK at 2.6 miles (4.2 km). The road number A122 has been reserved for the new road.

A planning application was initially submitted in 2020, before being withdrawn. A new planning application was submitted in November 2022; the planning process was expected to take 18 months, but this was extended due to the July 2024 general election. The crossing was eventually approved in March 2025, and early construction began in March 2026.

== Background ==
Described as "a crucial part of the country's strategic road network", the Dartford Crossing is the only fixed road crossing of the River Thames east of Greater London. Although officially designated as the A282, the crossing is considered part of the M25 motorway orbital route around London. Last expanded in 1991 with the opening of the Queen Elizabeth II Bridge, the crossing is the busiest estuarial route in the United Kingdom, with an average daily use of around 160,000 vehicles. The crossing has high levels of congestion, especially at peak times – with high levels of air pollution impacting neighbouring Thurrock and Dartford. A variety of additional crossings downstream of the Dartford Crossing have been proposed.

Until 2024, there was a ferry service operating between Gravesend and Tilbury, which predominantly carried foot passengers and bicycles, Monday to Saturday.

== History ==
A crossing between Gravesend and Tilbury had been proposed as far back as the 18th century, with Ralph Dodd promoting a tunnel scheme. This received parliamentary approval through the Gravesend and Tilbury Tunnel Act 1799, and work began in 1800 with a vertical shaft on the Gravesend side. Despite the use of an early steam engine to pump water, flooding was a problem. This and a lack of funds led to the project being abandoned in 1802.

An additional Thames crossing downstream from Dartford was considered in the Roads for Prosperity white paper in 1989, noting that it would "[relieve the] east side of the M25 between Kent and Essex".

The Lower Thames Crossing (LTC) was recommended for further investigation in the 2002 ORBIT Multi-Model Study, which examined orbital transport problems around London.

In 2008, Metrotidal Ltd proposed the "Medway-Canvey Island crossing", a £2–4 billion combined road and rail tunnel between Medway and Canvey Island that would include a surge-tide barrier and a tidal power plant, which was supported by Kent County Council, Essex County Council, the Thames Gateway South Essex Partnership and the Department for Transport. Following delays in any proposal being put forward by central government, Essex and Kent County Councils intend to create a joint proposal for the construction of a crossing.

In January 2009, the Department for Transport published a study regarding potential ways to address capacity issues crossing the Thames. This included short term measures to improve the existing Dartford Crossing, as well as evaluation of future crossings in the long term. The study considered five corridors that could provide a future crossing of the Thames, with options A, B and C to be investigated in further detail.

- Option A – Additional capacity at the existing Dartford Crossing
- Option B – Swanscombe Peninsula linking the A2 to the A1089
- Option C – East of Gravesend linking to the M20
- Option D – M2 link to Canvey Island
- Option E – Isle of Grain linking to east of Southend-on-Sea

The study also identified a lack of demand for additional passenger rail or rail freight capacity to cross the river beyond projects already under construction/completed, noting the High Speed 1 and Crossrail projects would provide cross-river capacity between London and Kent.

In October 2010, a study commissioned by Kent County Council proposed that the northern end of the crossing should bypass the M25 and continue on to connect to the M11 (and Stansted Airport) directly. This would presumably be an adaptation of Option C.

In October 2012, plans were announced for the London Resort theme park near Swanscombe. Commenting on road and motorway access to the park, Kent County Council highways chief Councillor Brian Sweetland said that he was looking at a significant variation to Option B: "The possibility of a new Thames Crossing at the Swanscombe peninsula must now be taken very seriously".

In 2016, build costs of the various route options were estimated to be between £4.3 and £5.9 billion (equivalent to £5.9 and £8.1 billion in 2025). In 2019 the crossing was estimated to take six years to build.

In April 2017, the Secretary of State for Transport Chris Grayling confirmed Option C as the preferred route for the Lower Thames Crossing.

In November 2017, Highways England announced that its 'current thinking' for the design of the route encompassed a number of changes from that of the original public consultation: the route would now avoid a landfill site near Ockendon; the junction with the A13 would be redesigned and the junctions with the A128 and A226 would be removed. Furthermore, the A2 would be widened from its junction with the new crossing approach road to Junction 1 of the M2.

In March 2018, Tim Jones in his position as LTC Project Director confirmed that the proposed LTC would not resolve all the problems both north and south of the river.

In July 2019, Highways England said they expected to submit a planning application in summer 2020 and had a target for road opening of 2027. On 26 October 2020, Highways England submitted a Development Consent Order (DCO) for the project. However, it was withdrawn the following month after the planning inspectorate asked for more information regarding environmental impact and construction plans.

=== Proposed routes 2009 ===
In January 2009, the Department for Transport proposed three major options to increase capacity east of London over the River Thames to be built downstream of the existing Dartford Crossing and an additional proposal to increase capacity at the Dartford Crossing.

- Option A: Building an additional 1 mile (1.6 km) road crossing at the current Dartford Crossing (A282) in addition to the current two tunnels (north) and four-lane bridge (South).
  - Option A Route 14: Proposed tunnel (approximately 7 miles (11 km) in length between the end of the M25 in Essex to the beginning of the M25 in Kent – essentially completing the London Orbital Road). Area covering junctions 30, 31, 1 and 2.
- Option B: A new road crossing in the Swanscombe Peninsula area, connecting the A2 near Dartford (south) to the A1089 road, north of Tilbury Docks. This option was dropped in 2013 because of the proposed London Resort.
- Option C: A new road crossing connecting the M25 in Essex with the M2/A2 in the south, which might be linked via a proposed new Thames flood barrier. The route from the north would start at M25 between Junctions 29 and 30, and pass South Ockendon, Orsett, Chadwell St Mary and East Tilbury before it crossed the Thames just to the east of Thurrock and Gravesend. It would join the M2/A2 at Thong. Option C has several variations, three possible routes to the north of the river, known as Option C Routes 1, 2 and 3 respectively. To the south of the river, the two options are known as the Western and Eastern southern links.

There were three additional route options identified:

- Option D1: M2 Link to A130 via Cliffe/Pitsea
- Option D2: M2 Link to A130 via Canvey Island
- Option E: Isle of Grain Link to East of Southend

Following the first stage of location identification and appraisal, the 2009 study concluded that the three locations (A, B and C) offered the greatest benefits in terms of relieving congestion at the existing crossing and should be assessed further. Locations D and E were discounted due to either not meeting the traffic objective to relieve congestion, or providing very limited relief at the existing Dartford Crossing, as well as poor to low value for money.

=== 2020 proposals ===
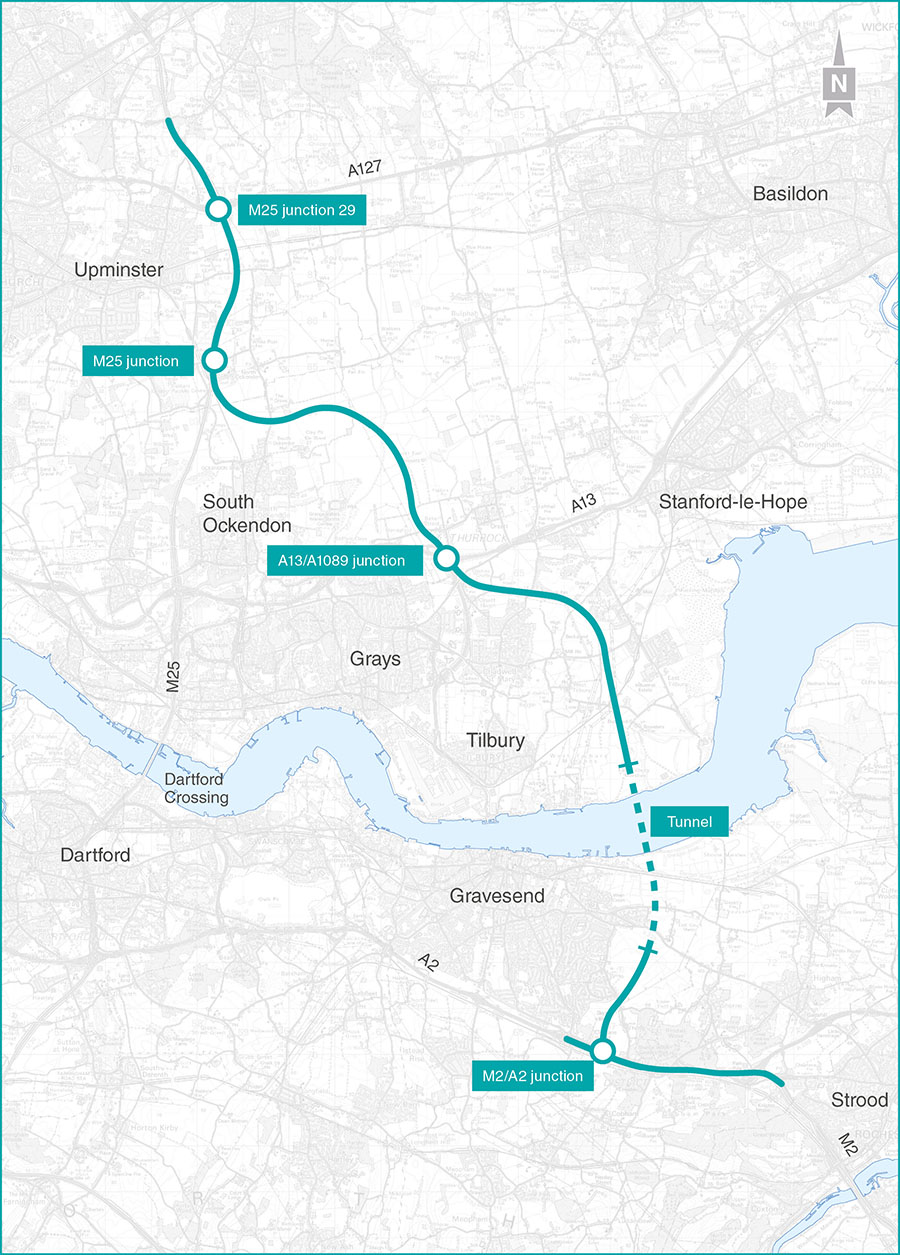
Final planned route

Highways England issued revised proposals in 2020 based on the previous Option C. The proposed route would run from the M25 at North Ockendon to the A2 at Thong, including an intermediate junction with the A13 and A1089 roads. The route would be 14.3 miles (23 km) including 2.6 miles (4.3 km) in twin tunnels with three traffic lanes, and would be an all-purpose trunk road rather than a motorway. Construction was expected to take six years.

In April 2021, Highways England announced that they had split the construction of the road into three sections. Two contractors would build the roads north and south of the tunnel, at a cost of £1.3 billion and £600 million respectively. Another contractor would build the tunnel, at a cost of £2.3 billion. This would allow construction of the project to begin immediately after the DCO process is completed.

The crossing was slated to cost between £6.4 billion and £8.28 billion, but investment in local roads is also likely to be necessary to deal with the predicted increases in traffic once the crossing opens. The cost of the proposed LTC is currently more expensive per mile than the HS2 project which is currently predicted to cost £307 million per mile of track, the LTC at current predicted costing would be nearly £573.5 million per mile. In November 2022, it was announced that the expected cost had risen to £9 billion, later (December 2025) revised to £10.6 billion. In June 2026, an extra £174 million was allocated to fund public works at both ends of the tunnel, with the main funding expected to be £3.1 billion of public money and £7.5 billion from the private sector.

=== Development Consent Order application (planning permission) ===
In October 2020, Highways England submitted their application for a Development Consent Order (DCO) for the proposed Lower Thames Crossing. After submission, the Planning Inspectorate requested details missing from the application, as well as more information on construction plans and the environmental impact of the scheme from Highways England. In November 2020, Highways England were advised that the Planning Inspectorate would not accept the application. Following this feedback, Highways England instead chose to withdraw the DCO application and carry out further work for a resubmission in 2021. On 20 March 2021, the 120 day internal deadline was missed. In summer 2022, a further local consultation took place, with a new DCO application submitted in November 2022. The DCO process is expected to take around 18 months, which will include public hearings.

A decision on the Lower Thames Crossing was due on 20 June 2024, but this was delayed by six months because of the July 2024 general election. A new planning application was submitted in November 2022; the planning process was expected to take 18 months, but this was extended to 4 October 2024, due to the July 2024 general election. A decision to further postpone a decision was announced in October 2024. The crossing was finally approved in March 2025. In October 2025, the incoming Starmer government transferred responsibility for the costs of the crossing from National Highways to the Department for Transport.

=== Construction ===
In January 2023, Balfour Beatty was announced as the contractor for the £1.2 billion Roads North of the Thames contract to construct 10 miles (16 km) of highways connecting the M25 at Junction 29 and the A13 with the northern side of the proposed tunnel. In July 2023, Skanska was announced as the contractor for the £450 million Kent Roads contract to construct 3.7 miles (6.0 km) of roads connecting the A2/M2 to the southern side of the proposed tunnel. In December 2023, a joint venture (JV) of Bouygues and J. Murphy & Sons was announced as the contractor for the £1.3 billion Tunnels and Approaches contract to construct the tunnel, tunnel systems and approach roads. To save costs, the Bouygues-Murphy JV intends to use one tunnel boring machine (TBM) for both tunnel bores, turning it around and reusing it.

Subject to agreement on the DCO and 18 months of detailed design and pre-construction planning, construction work is estimated to take around 6 to 7 years. In March 2023, it was announced that the planned completion date of 2029 had been pushed back by two years. At this point, £800 million had already been spent on the project. As of December 2023, the target date for completion was 2032. Consent for the crossing was finally given in March 2025, with construction planned to start in 2026, but project financing was still to be agreed with the government exploring private finance options over public funding. In June 2025, the government granted the project £590 million, with a further £891 million granted in November 2025 to complete publicly funded works for the crossing, with the private sector then managing its construction and long-term operation. In December 2025, the Bouygues-Murphy JV was reported to be negotiating to buy the TBM which will be used to bore both tunnels up to 65m below the surface of the Thames. The project's overall cost was now forecast at over £10bn, with the Government footing £3.1bn of the cost, and leveraging £7.5bn of private funding. In December 2025, the opening of the Lower Thames Crossing was pushed back by two years, to 2034.

In March 2026, early construction work began on both sides of the river, with archaeological work at Coalhouse Fort in East Tilbury.

== Route ==
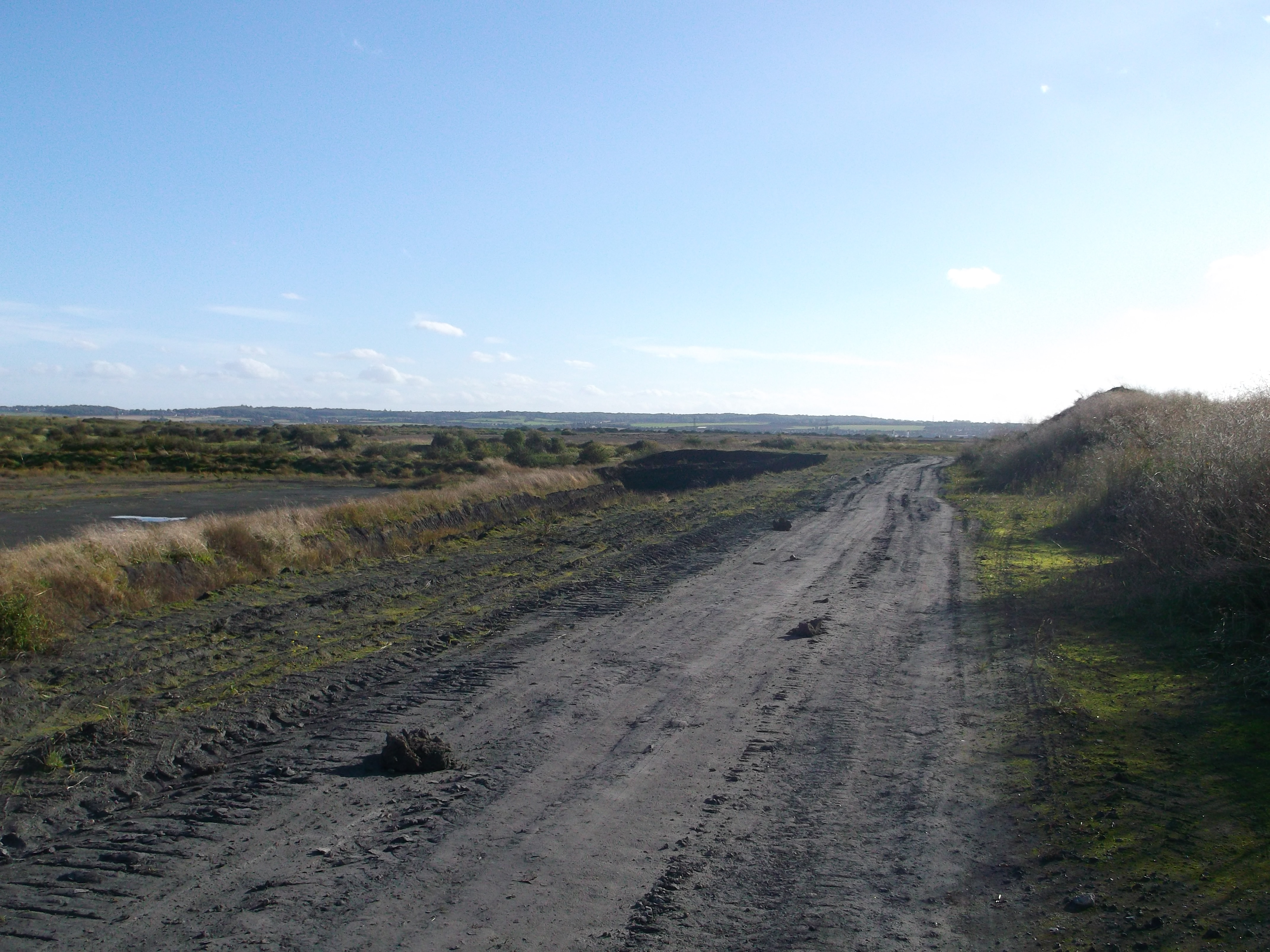
Approximate location of the north tunnel portal, taken in 2012

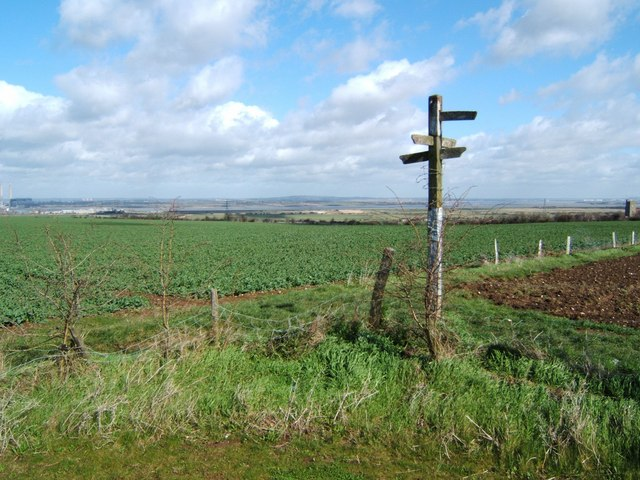
View of the area where the southern tunnel portal will be constructed, taken in 2006

The proposed route involves a twin-bore tunnel crossing under the River Thames east of Gravesend and Tilbury, linked north of the river by a new road to the M25 between junctions 29 and 30 while south of the river the new road will directly join the A2 at Thong east of Gravesend. It will run west of Shorne, not to the east, as a result of consultations. The twin-bore tunnel itself would be 4.2 kilometres (2.6 mi) and 16.4 metres (54 ft) in diameter each, which would make it the largest and longest road tunnel in the UK. The tunnels will each have three lanes for traffic.

There would be three junctions: Orsett on the A13, Thong on the A2 and north-bound slip roads on the M25 at junction 29. Junctions have been removed on the A226 south of Chalk and on the A128 at Chadwell St Mary in Essex.

== Environmental impact ==
The Woodland Trust opposes the project and expects twelve ancient woodlands and fifteen veteran trees to be close to or within the development boundary. Some of these are within the Shorne and Ashenbank Woods, a Site of Special Scientific Interest. However, the Trust states that Highways England have not disclosed how many habitats will be affected by the project, and calls for them to release this information. Highways England say that new trees will be planted to compensate for the lost ancient woodlands, which "is not a direct replacement for lost or damaged trees or woodland".

Essex Wildlife Trust is also opposed. The Trust acknowledges that a bored tunnel avoids direct impact on the wetlands and coastal habitats of the Thames estuary, but states that habitats will be destroyed at the site of the northern entrance to the tunnel. It states that the project will fragment habitats and the noise and light pollution it causes will reduce the remoteness and tranquility of the area. The Trust is also concerned that the project will increase car dependency and induce demand, and that as a result it will not decrease congestion and will lead to increased carbon dioxide emissions.

Transport Action Network is also opposed. Their report, Essex-Kent Superlinks, suggests sustainable alternatives to the Lower Thames Crossing that could bring better results at a fraction of the cost.

The Thames Crossing Action Group has been campaigning against the scheme since 2016. They have compiled an A-Z of the impacts the Lower Thames Crossing would have, and describe how the scheme is not fit for purpose.

Traffic modelling by Highways England predicts that constructing the Lower Thames Crossing would reduce the number of cars using the Dartford Tunnel. However, the total number of cars crossing the Thames (via the Lower Thames Crossing and the Dartford Tunnel) would increase. In addition to this, modelling predicts that the Dartford Tunnel would still be operating above capacity.

=== Mitigation ===
Highways England have stated that the road will be the "most environmentally sustainable road project delivered in the UK". Proposed landscaping and mitigation includes planting over 260 hectares of woodland, converting farmland to new habitats and building green bridges across the road. In 2024, Forestry England started developing Hole Farm Community Woodland, near Brentwood, Essex, as a 100 acre woodland and visitor centre in conjunction with National Highways as part of the planned mitigation.

=== Carbon dioxide emissions ===
Highways England initially refused to release emissions figures. However, in response to a freedom of information request in December 2020 it was revealed that construction of the Lower Thames Crossing is expected to release two million tonnes of carbon dioxide. A further 3.2 million tonnes would be emitted by traffic created by the road over sixty years of operation. The Woodland Trust claims that the carbon emissions of the road scheme are expected to be amongst the highest of any major road scheme currently developed by National Highways.

National Highways has responded to concerns over the scheme's carbon emissions by positioning the Lower Thames Crossing as a "carbon pathfinder" project. The organisation states that it aims to reduce construction emissions by 70% from the project's original baseline and has included a legally binding construction carbon limit in its planning consent application. Planned mitigation measures include the removal of diesel-powered construction equipment, greater use of hydrogen and electric machinery, and the adoption of lower-carbon materials. National Highways argues that the project will serve as a model for reducing emissions in future infrastructure schemes, although critics question whether such measures sufficiently offset the crossing's overall lifetime carbon impact.

== Perspectives ==
Supporters of the project include the government, business groups, trade organisations and major transportation hubs such as the Port of Dover. According to the Federation of Small Businesses, 83% of local businesses surveyed support the proposed crossing. Some local authorities support the proposed crossing, despite expressing specific concerns regarding environmental impacts.

Some campaign groups support the principle of a new crossing of the Thames, but not the chosen route. The Thames Crossing Action Group prefers new, longer tunnels at Dartford that would allow long-distance traffic on the M25 to bypass the existing Dartford Crossing.

Two local authorities, Thurrock Borough Council and Gravesham Borough Council oppose the project. Environmental groups such as Greenpeace, Woodland Trust, Kent Wildlife Trust and Campaign to Protect Rural England have expressed their opposition to the project on environmental grounds.

Transport Action Network have highlighted that the Lower Thames Crossing is a 'smart' motorway in all but name, being built to motorway standard but with no hard shoulder, and with the technology used by smart motorways.

== See also ==
- List of crossings of the River Thames
- List of road projects in the UK
- Silvertown Tunnel, a new road tunnel, located close to the Blackwall Tunnel
