= Brentwood, Essex =

Town in Essex, England

Coordinates: 51.620°N 0.305°E

Brentwood
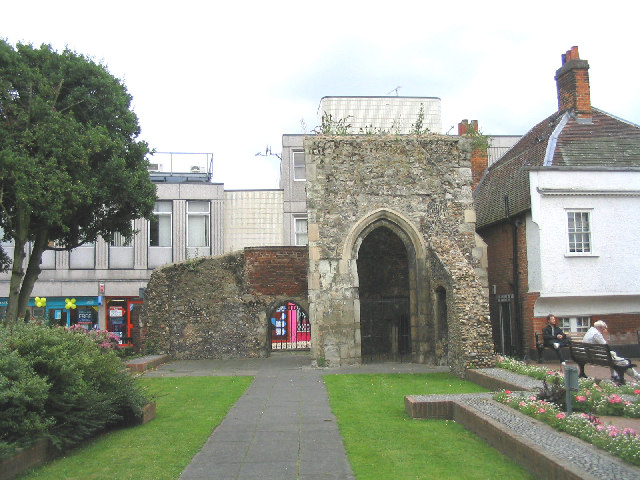
- The ruins of the Chapel of Thomas Becket

- Location within Essex
- Population: 55,340 (Built up area, 2021)
- OS grid reference: TQ595938
- District: Brentwood
- Shire county: Essex
- Region: East
- Country: England
- Sovereign state: United Kingdom
- Post town: BRENTWOOD
- Postcode district: CM13-CM15
- Dialling code: 01277
- Police: Essex
- Fire: Essex
- Ambulance: East of England
- UK Parliament: Brentwood and Ongar

Brentwood is a town in Essex, England. It forms part of the London commuter belt, lying 20 miles (32 km) north-east of Charing Cross in central London, and just outside the M25 London Orbital Motorway. Its suburbs include Shenfield, Warley, Brook Street and Hutton. It gives its name to the wider Borough of Brentwood which also covers surrounding rural areas. The population of the Brentwood built up area was 55,340 at the 2021 census.

It has a shopping area along the High Street, a Roman road which became one of the main roads between London and East Anglia. Beyond the town centre are residential developments surrounded by open countryside and woodland; some of this countryside lies within only a few hundred yards of the town centre. Brentwood Cathedral is the seat of the Roman Catholic Diocese of Brentwood.

== Toponymy ==
The name Brentwood is Old English and means "burnt wood". In some early records the name was translated into Latin as "Bosco Arso", which form was recorded around 1176.

== History ==
=== Early history ===
Although a Bronze Age axe has been found in Brentwood and there are clear signs of an entrenched encampment in Weald Country Park, it is considered unlikely that there was any significant early settlement of the area. At the time, most of Essex was covered by the Great Forest. It is believed that despite the Roman road between London and Colchester passing through the town, the Saxons were the earliest settlers of the area.

The town grew up at a crossroads, where the Roman road crossed a north-south route. The area historically formed part of the parish of South Weald, but the crossroads is 1.5 miles (2.4 km) east of South Weald's parish church. A chapel of ease was built in or around 1221, just west of the crossroads, and in 1227 Brentwood was granted a market charter.

The town's growth may have been stimulated by the cult of Thomas Becket, to whom the chapel was dedicated: the chapel was a popular stopping point for pilgrims on their way to Canterbury. The ruins of St Thomas's Chapel stand on the south side of High Street. The nearby modern Anglican parish church of Brentwood, built in the 1880s, retains the dedication to St Thomas of Canterbury. Pilgrims Hatch, or 'Pilgrims' gate', was probably named from pilgrims who crossed through on their way to the chapel. It is likely, however, that Brentwood's development was due chiefly to its main road position, its market and its convenient location as an administrative centre. Early industries were connected mainly with textile and garment making, brewing, and brickmaking.

During the Peasants' Revolt of 1381, Brentwood was the meeting place for some of the instigators, such as John Ball and Jack Straw. They apparently met regularly in local pubs and inns. The first event of the Peasants' Revolt occurred in Brentwood, when men from Fobbing, Corringham and Stanford were summoned by the commissioner Thomas Bampton to Brentwood to answer as to who had avoided paying the poll tax. Bampton insisted that the peasants pay what was demanded of them. The peasants refused to pay and a riot ensued as Bampton attempted to arrest the peasants. The peasants moved to kill Bampton, but he managed to escape to London. The rioters then, fearing the repercussions of what they had done, fled into the forest. After the riot, the peasants sent word to the rest of the country and initiated the Peasants' Revolt.

The Essex assizes were sometimes held here, as well as at Chelmsford.

The former White Hart coaching inn on High Street is one of the oldest buildings in Brentwood. In the early 21st century it served as the Sugar Hut nightclub. The building's façade was rebuilt in the early 20th century, but the main structure of the building dates back to the late 15th century. It is believed to have been built in 1480 although apocryphal evidence suggests a hostelry might have stood on the site as much as a hundred years earlier and been visited in 1392 by Richard II, whose coat of arms included a White Hart. The ground floor was originally stabling and in the mid-1700s the owners ran their own coach service to London. The building suffered significant damage during a fire in 2009 but has since been repaired.

Marygreen Manor, a 16th-century building on London Road, is mentioned in Samuel Pepys' diaries and is said to have been often visited by the Tudor monarch Henry VIII when Henry Roper, Gentleman Pursuant to Queen Catherine of Aragon, lived there in 1514. It is now a hotel and restaurant. In 1686, Brentwood's inns were estimated to provide 110 beds and stabling for 183 horses. There were 11 inns in the town in 1788.

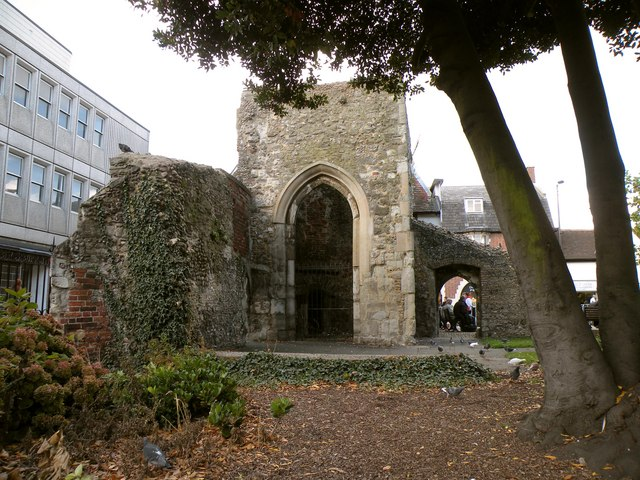
The Baytree Centre

Protestant martyr William Hunter was burnt at the stake in Brentwood in 1555. A monument to him was erected by subscription in 1861 at Wilson's Corner. Brentwood School was founded in 1557 and established in 1558, in Ingrave Road and behind the greens on Shenfield Road by Sir Anthony Browne and the site of Hunter's execution in commemorated by a plaque in the school. Thomas Munn, 'gentleman brickmaker' of Brentwood, met a less noble end when he was hanged for robbing the Yarmouth mail and his body was exhibited in chains at Gallows Corner, a road junction a few miles from Brentwood, in Romford. A ducking stool was mentioned in 1584.

As the Roman road grew busier, Brentwood became a major coaching stop for stagecoaches, with plenty of inns for overnight accommodation as the horses were rested. A 'stage' was approximately ten miles, and being about 20 miles (32 km) from London, Brentwood would have been a second stop for travellers to East Anglia. This has not changed; there is an above average number of pubs in the area - possibly due to the army being stationed at Warley Barracks until 1958. Some of the pubs date back to the 15th and 16th centuries. Brentwood was also significant as a hub for the London postal service, with a major post office since the 18th century. The major post office on the high street was closed in the 2008 budget cuts; Brentwood residents now must rely on sub-post offices.

Daniel Defoe wrote about Brentwood as being "...full of good inns, and chiefly maintained by the excessive multitude of carriers and passengers, which are constantly passing this way to London, with droves of cattle, provisions and manufactures."

The 'Brentwood Ring', the earliest Christian ring ever to have been discovered in Britain was found in Brentwood in the late 1940s. It now resides at the British Museum in London. The only other ring of its type in existence can be found at the Vatican Museum in Rome.

=== Modern history ===
Brentwood railway station was opened in 1840 by the Eastern Counties Railway on its main line from London. Brentwood temporarily served as the line's eastern terminus until the rest of the line to Colchester was completed in 1843.

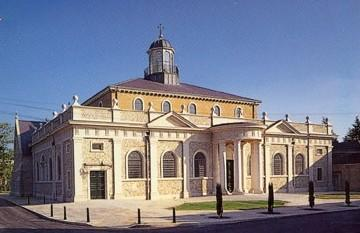
Brentwood Cathedral

In 1917, the Roman Catholic church on Ingrave Road was awarded cathedral status. Between 1989 and 1991 the building was modified to an Italianate Classical style. Brentwood Cathedral is currently the seat of the Roman Catholic Bishop of Brentwood. Nearby Ingatestone Hall is noted for its Roman Catholic connections through the Petre family. The hall is a 16th-century manor house built by Sir William Petre at Yenge-atte-Stone. The staunch Petres played a significant role in the preservation of the Catholic faith in England. Sir William was assistant to Thomas Cromwell when Henry VIII sought to dissolve the monasteries and ascended to the confidential post of Secretary of State, throughout the revolutionary changes of four Tudor monarchs:Henry VIII, Edward VI, Mary I, and Elizabeth I. Queen Mary, in 1553, on her way to claim her crown in London, stopped at Ingatestone Hall; later, Queen Elizabeth I spent several nights at the hall on her royal progress of 1561.

Today, Ingatestone Hall, like all other large Tudor houses, is an expression of wealth and status and retains many of the features of a 16th-century knightly residence, despite alterations by descendants who still live in the house. Ingatestone Hall represented the exterior of Bleak House in the 2005 television adaptation of Charles Dickens' novel, and also appeared in an episode of the television series Lovejoy. It is open to the public for tours, concerts, and performances; the hall and grounds can be rented for weddings and other occasions.

Brentwood was the location of Warley Hospital, a psychiatric hospital, from 1853 to 2001.

=== Military history ===
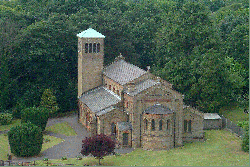
Essex Regiment Chapel, Warley.

The military has associations with Warley going back over 200 years. It also had strategic importance during the time of the Spanish Armada - it was used as a meeting place for contingents from eight eastern and midland counties (900 horsemen assembled here) to then travel on to Tilbury.

Until 1742, Warley Common was a training ground for the Essex Militia. It then became a training ground for the regular army. 106 acres were purchased by the War Office in 1804, and Warley Barracks established. In 1843 the East India Company, facilities included an Elephant training school, moved there. After the Indian Mutiny, which occurred soon after, the troops of the company were absorbed into the British Army. The site became the HQ of the Essex Regiment in 1881.

The site remained an active army base as a depot for the Essex Regiment until 1959, when much of the site was redeveloped as the European headquarters for the Ford Motor Company. A few buildings remain from the Barracks – the Essex Regiment Chapel, the gymnasium (now home to Brentwood Trampoline Club) and the officers' mess (now Marillac Hospital).

During World War II, over 1,000 bombs were dropped on Brentwood, with 19 flying bombs (V1), 32 long-range rockets (V2) and many incendiary bombs and parachute mines. 5,038 houses were destroyed, 389 people were injured and 43 died. The 15th- and 16th-century pubs, however, survived. Brentwood had been considered a safe enough haven to evacuate London children here - 6,000 children arrived in September 1939 alone.

=== Today ===
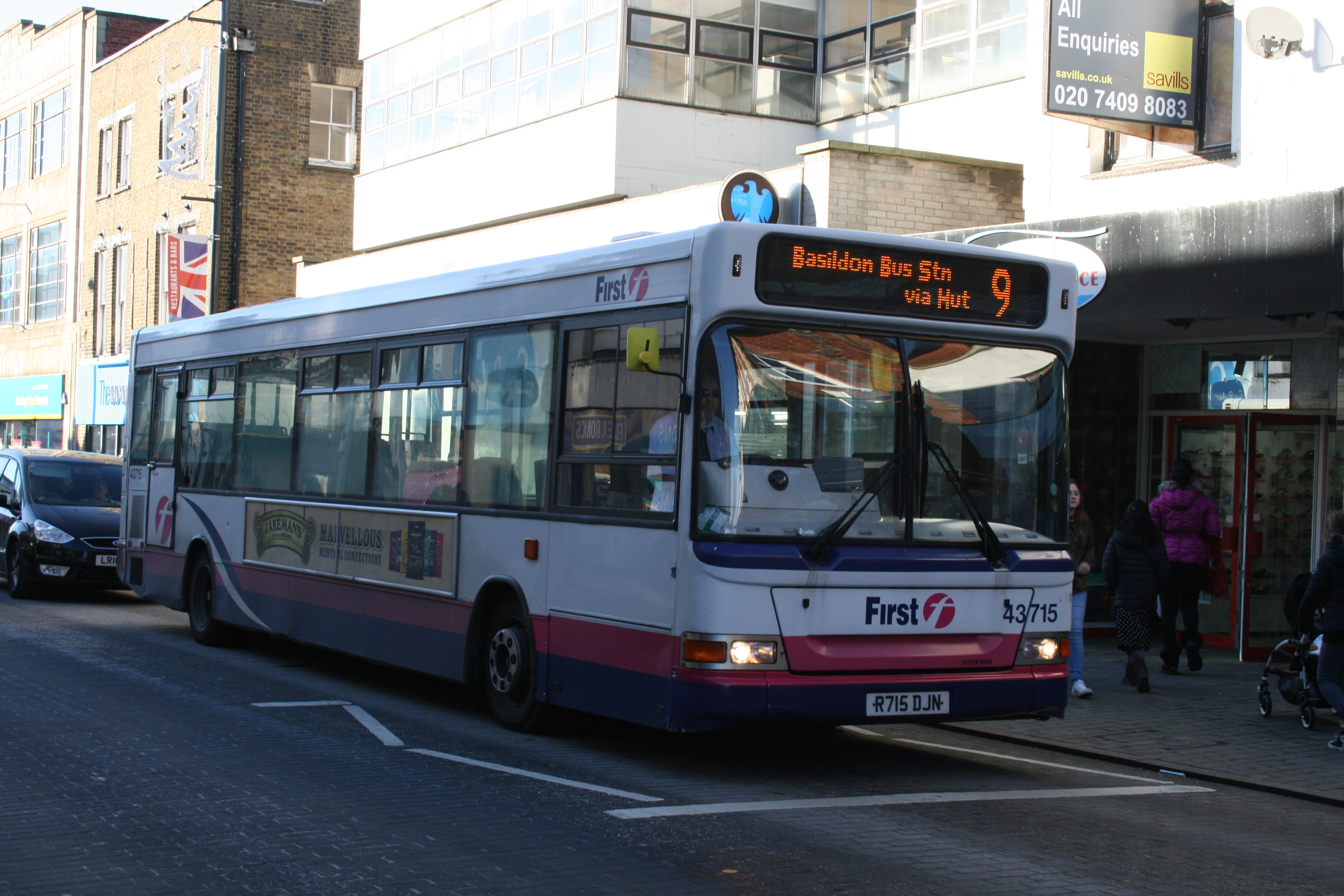
A bus in Brentwood High Street

The town is increasingly suburban, but it does have a very rural feel, with trees, fields and open spaces all around the town; Shenfield Common is also less than one mile from town centre shops.

Brentwood's high street has also been subject to major redevelopment works costing between £3 million and £7 million. This included the demolition of the Sir Charles Napier pub to build an additional lane to improve traffic flow at the west end of the high street, and re-laying the pavements and road surface in the high street itself.

There is a proposal for creating Dunton Garden Suburb on land between Basildon and Brentwood. This proposal may have 6,000 homes, together with retail, commercial and leisure uses. This is a joint proposal of the two councils and a public consultation ended in March 2015. The proposal has met with criticism from all political parties and the residents group Residents Against Inappropriate Development

== Education ==
Secondary schools include

- Brentwood County High School
- Brentwood School
- St Martin's School
- Brentwood Ursuline Convent High School
- Becket Keys Church of England School
- Shenfield High School

Primary schools include St Helens Catholic Junior School, St Peters C of E, St Thomas of Canterbury C of E, Warley Primary, Willowbrook Primary, Holly Trees Primary, Hogarth Primary and Larchwood Primary School

== Business ==
The Ford Motor Company's United Kingdom headquarters were located in the suburb of Warley until 2018, as was a large production facility for Ilford Photo (until 1983).

From the financial services sector, Equity Insurance Group, comprising Equity Red Star (of Lloyd's of London), affinity provider Equity Direct Broking Limited and motorcycle insurance broker Bike Team, is headquartered in the town centre. General insurance broker Brents Insurance was established in the town in 1963. The Bank of New York Mellon also has a substantial presence in Brentwood, as does LV=, employing 350 people there.

The previous headquarters of electronics company Amstrad were located in Brentwood. The television show The Apprentice used overhead views of the Canary Wharf business district in London as an accompaniment to interior shots of their previous offices, Amstrad House, which has since been converted into a Premier Inn hotel.

Well-known businesses that used to operate in the town include vacuum flask manufacturer Thermos, and Nissen whose UK factory and headquarters were established in the town by Ted Blake in the mid-1960s but closed in the 1980s.

== Governance ==
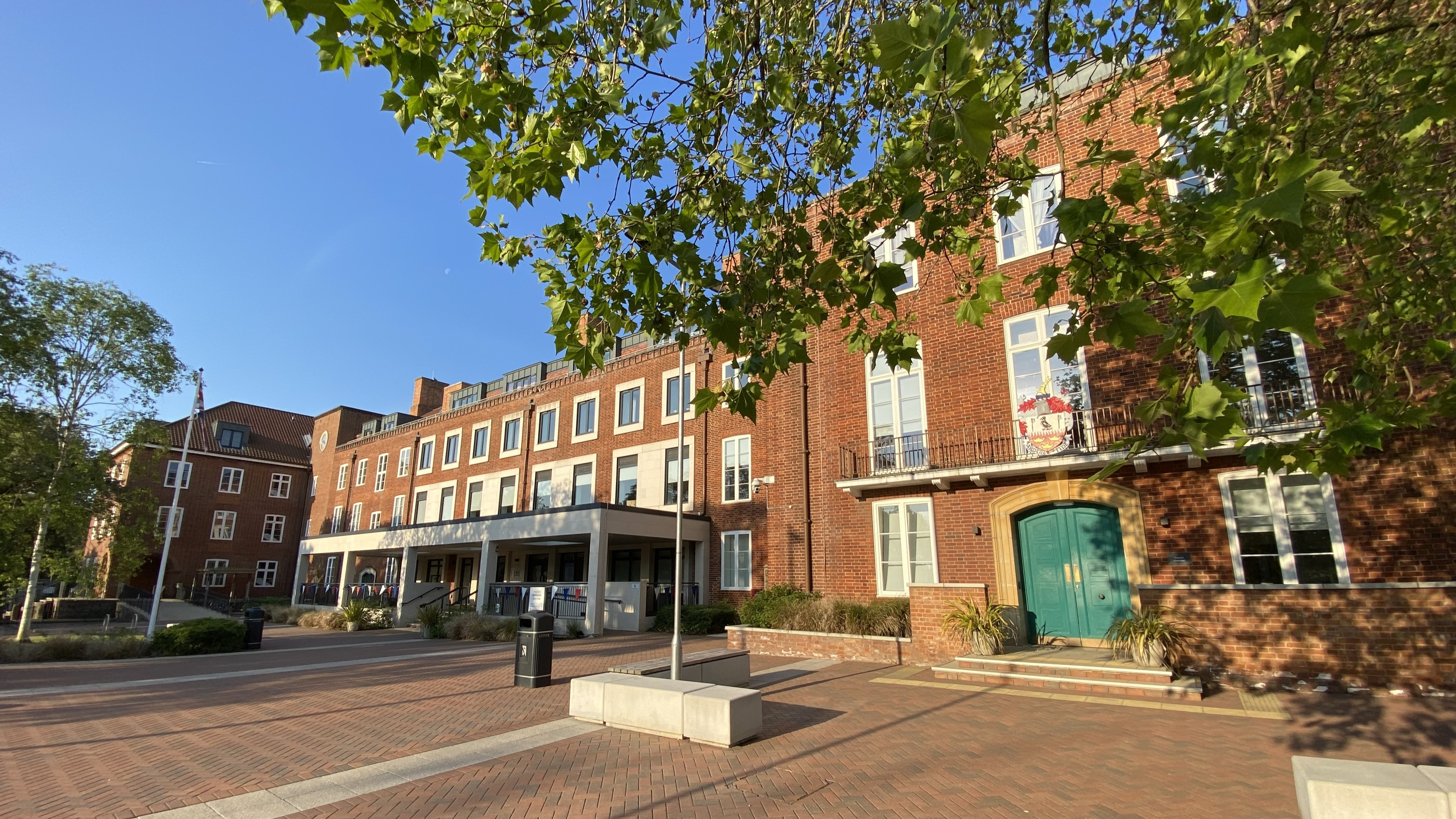
Brentwood Town Hall

There are two tiers of local government covering Brentwood, at district (borough) and county level: Brentwood Borough Council, based at Brentwood Town Hall, and Essex County Council, based in Chelmsford.

For national elections, the town forms part of the Brentwood and Ongar constituency.

=== Administrative history ===
Brentwood was historically a chapelry in the parish of South Weald. From the 17th century onwards, parishes were given various civil functions under the poor laws. Such civil functions were administered separately for the chapelry of Brentwood and the rest of South Weald parish. Brentwood therefore became a separate civil parish from South Weald in 1866 when the legal definition of 'parish' was changed to be the areas used for administering the poor laws. The area ceded from South Weald to Brentwood was modest; the whole ancient parish of South Weald comprised 5,088 acres (2,059 ha), of which just 459 acres (186 ha) comprised the chapelry and subsequent civil parish of Brentwood.

When elected parish and district councils were established in 1894 the parish was included in the Billericay Rural District. In 1899 the parish of Brentwood was removed from the rural district and converted into its own urban district. The urban district was substantially enlarged in 1934, when the neighbouring parishes of Childerditch, East Horndon, Hutton, Ingrave, Little Warley, Shenfield, South Weald and West Horndon were all abolished and absorbed into Brentwood (with some adjustments to the boundaries with other neighbouring parishes).

The urban district council built Brentwood Town Hall on Ingrave Road in 1957 to serve as its headquarters. Brentwood Urban District was abolished in 1974 and replaced by the larger Brentwood District, gaining the neighbouring rural parishes of Blackmore, Doddinghurst, Ingatestone and Fryerning, Kelvedon Hatch, Mountnessing, Navestock and Stondon Massey. No successor parish was created for the former urban district. The enlarged district has an area of 36,378 acres (147.22 km^{2}) and was awarded borough status in 1993, allowing the chair of the council to take the title of mayor.

== Transport ==
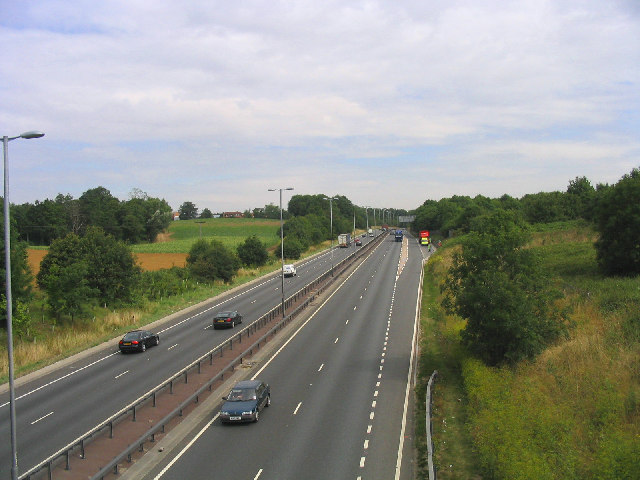
The A12 road passes Brentwood

=== Buses ===
Brentwood is served by a number of bus services, operated predominantly by First Essex and also by Arriva Herts & Essex, Ensignbus and Stagecoach London. London Buses route 498 links Romford with Brentwood and operates daily.

=== Road ===
The A12, which runs between east London and Lowestoft, by-passes the town to the north and the London orbital M25 motorway is located 1.2 miles (2 km) to the south-west of the town. The A128, which links Ongar with Orsett, travels through the centre of the town. The A129 travels through the north and east of the town, connecting Brentwood with Billericay and Hadleigh. The A1023 passes through Brentwood, connecting the town with the A12.

=== Railway ===
Brentwood railway station is located to the south of the town centre and is served by frequent Elizabeth line services between Shenfield and London Paddington, via Liverpool Street, with two trains per hour continuing to Heathrow Terminal 5.

Also sited within the Borough of Brentwood are Ingatestone and Shenfield stations, from which Greater Anglia provides fast services to Liverpool Street and East Anglia; West Horndon hosts c2c services between London Fenchurch Street and Shoeburyness.

The nearest London Underground station is situated just outside of the borough, Upminster (District line).

== Arts and media ==
The Brentwood Theatre and The Hermitage are the main cultural buildings in the town, located on the same site in the town centre.

Owned and maintained by an independent charity, Brentwood Theatre is a fully fitted community theatre that serves more than 40 non-professional performing arts groups. The Hermitage is used as the centre for Brentwood Youth Service.

The Hermitage youth service operates its own cafe, youth club and a live music venue called The Hermit, which has had hosted bands such as Motörhead and InMe. InMe were heavily supported in their early years by the venue, whose purpose is to promote and encourage youth bands. It also plays host to private events such as a weekly jazz club that was run by the saxophonist Spike Robinson until his death. Both venues co-host the Brentwood Blues Festival, a music event that has played host to the Blockheads and Bill Wyman.

Local TV coverage is provided by BBC London and ITV London which is received from the Crystal Palace TV transmitter. Some areas of town can also receive BBC East and ITV Anglia from the Sudbury TV transmitter.

Local radio stations are BBC Essex on 95.3 FM, Heart East on 96.3 FM, and Phoenix FM, a community radio station that serves the Brentwood area. The station was formed in August 1996 and broadcast ten trial broadcasts under a restricted service licence, each lasting 28 days, the first starting on 29 December 1996 and the last ending on 25 February 2006. On 23 March 2007, the station started to broadcast permanently on 98.0 FM, featuring popular music, local musicians and acts, local events, and interviews with key local figures.

The Brentwood Art Trail has become a popular annual summer event which was developed to create an arts experience whereby art created by local people can be recognised and appreciated.

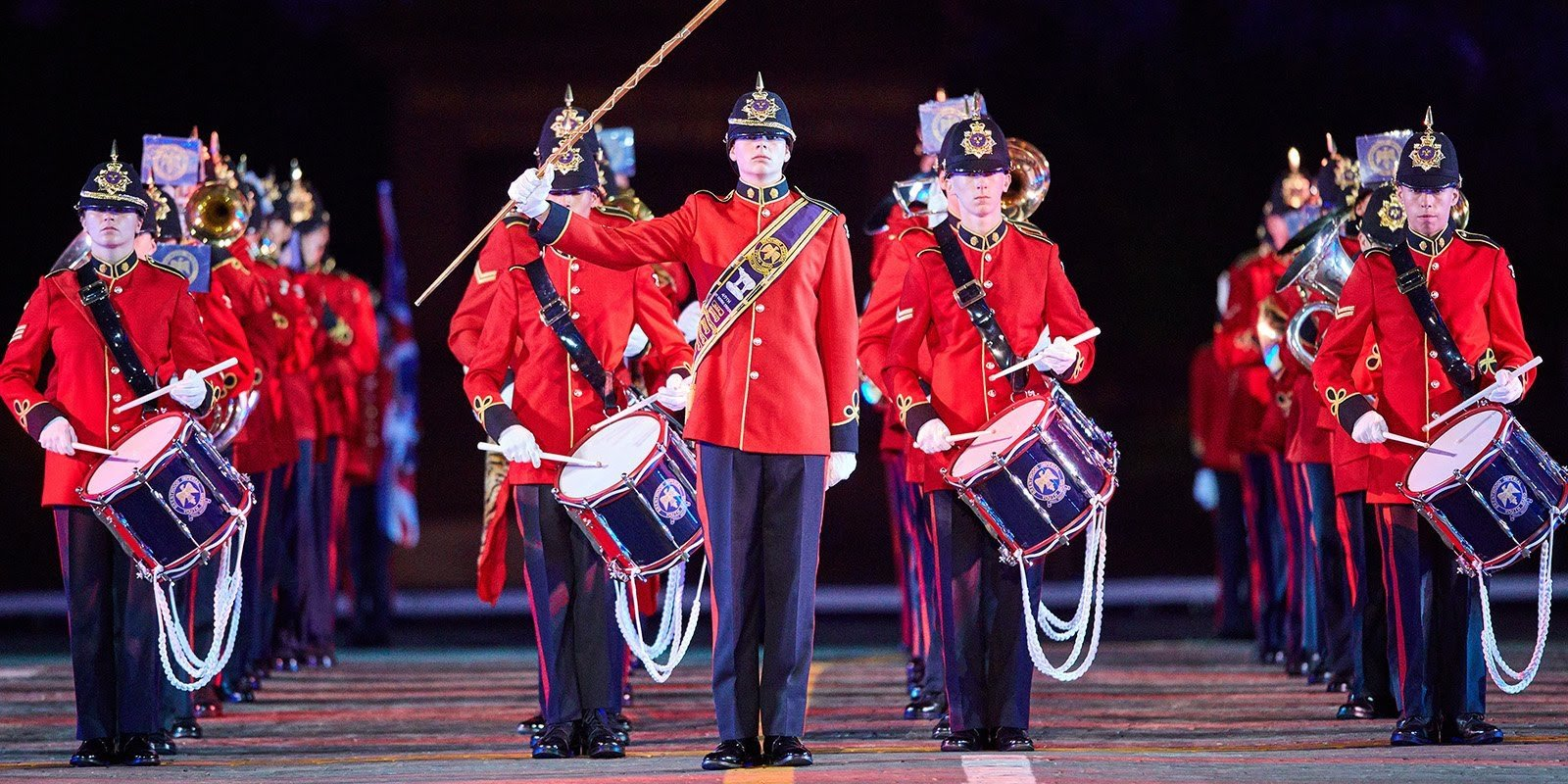
The Brentwood Imperial Youth Marching Band on Red Square in 2018.

Brentwood is also home to the Brentwood Imperial Youth Band, which perform at many events throughout the year. It is a successful band and attracts youngsters from the age of 10 from Brentwood and surrounding areas. It was the first British band to ever take part in the Tournament of Roses Parade in Pasadena, California and the first youth band to play the Spasskaya Tower Military Music Festival and Tattoo on Moscow's Red Square. It meets twice a week in Warley.

Among the many theatre companies in the region, Brentwood Operatic Society and Shenfield Operatic Society are two that represent the many groups providing excellent theatrical productions for the community. Brentwood Operatic Society also trains young actors with its BOSSY Youth acting program, headed by Gaynor Wilson, who formerly directed actor Stephen Moyer. David Pickthall was a significant presence in Brentwood's musical output, until his conviction for sexual offences between 1979 and 2021.

Brentwood's Orchestras for Young People was founded in 1990 and grew to include five ensembles for orchestral instrumentalists of school age, who perform regularly in and around the town. Regular rehearsals and workshops introduce the musicians to a wide variety of music, from well-known classical pieces to modern music.

The Brentwood Performing Arts Festival has now been accepted into membership by the British and International Federation of Festivals of which Queen Elizabeth II was patron. With this, the Festival has achieved recognition as the Festival of Performing Arts for Brentwood.

The town is the venue of the Brentwood International Chess Congress which was set up in 2006 and first ran 17–18 February 2007. The congress attracted 235 competitors who included three Grandmasters and five International Masters. The prize fund is relatively generous in comparison to many other similar congresses, being around £4,000. In 2007 it was the largest chess competition to be held in Essex and was organised by Brentwood Chess Club.

The Only Way Is Essex is a British reality television series based in Brentwood.

== Twinning ==
Since 1978, Brentwood has been twinned with Roth in Germany and with Montbazon in France since 1994. It also has a relationship with Brentwood, Tennessee in the United States.

== Sport, parks and open spaces ==
Although close to the extremities of Greater London, Brentwood is surrounded by open countryside and woodland. This has been cited as showing the success of the Metropolitan Green Belt in halting the outward spread of London's built-up area.

Brentwood has a number of public open spaces including King George V Playing Field, Shenfield Common, and two country parks at South Weald and Thorndon. Weald Country Park was first chosen to hold the 2012 Olympics mountain biking but was declared to be "too easy" a course. Brentwood does however host a number of Criterium Cycle Races that attract many of Britain's greatest cyclists. In 2024, work was started on Hole Farm Community Woodland, a 100 acre woodland and visitor centre developed by National Highways and Forestry England due to open in 2025.

The town has two large sports centres providing access to a range of sports including badminton, squash, swimming and football. There are a number of golf courses, including a 70-par municipal course very close to the town centre at Hartswood as well as others in the surrounding countryside. A number of cricket clubs exist in and around the town although the County Ground, closest to the town centre, no longer hosts Essex matches. Brentwood is also home to non-league football club Brentwood Town F.C. and basketball team London Leopards, who both play at the Brentwood Centre Arena. The town is also home to National Conference Southern League club Brentwood Eels RLFC, the only rugby league club in west Essex. Brentwood Hockey Club is also based in the town at the Old County Ground and fielded 6 men's and 5 ladies' league teams for the 2014–15 season.

Brentwood Running Club, established in 1987 as Thrift Green Trotters, aims to encourage local runners to improve their fitness whilst having fun and meeting like-minded runners. The club night is on Wednesdays, meeting at 7:30PM at the Brentwood Centre. A Beginners' group following the 13-week 'Couch to 5k' programme is run twice a year.

In 2022, a new track and field athletics club was established using the track located at Brentwood School. With more than 250 active members, Brentwood Beagles Athletics Club takes athletes from the age of five through to all masters aged athletes across all track and field, road running and cross country disciplines and event groups. In their first year of operation they have already had athletes competing nationally and also representing the county in a range of events. First year wins and trophies include the U13G 2022/23 Essex XC Relay Champions, six county championship medals, a number of Essex Schools Vests, County vests and national medals. In September 2022, the Beagles appointed former Chief Executive of Brentwood Borough Council, Bob McLintock, as their inaugural President.

Although no longer manufactured here, Brentwood became the centre of trampolining in the United Kingdom between 1965 and 1981 after George Nissen brought the new sport to the town in 1949 and eventually manufactured trampolines in the town, continuing to do so for many years after they ceased production in the US for fear of litigation. Ted Blake, a long-term Brentwood resident, was managing director of Nissen UK from its inception until shortly before it closed and became a leading figure worldwide in the development of modern trampolining. Brentwood still has a thriving trampolining community but no longer a local factory.

The town also has a large volleyball club and the only handball club in Essex.

== Notable people ==
- Frank Bruno — boxer
- Leddra Chapman — singer
- Flynn Downes — footballer
- Jonathan Firth — actor
- Eddie Hearn — sports promoter
- Jonty Hearnden — television presenter
- Johnny Herbert — three-time Formula One race winner and winner of 1991 Le Mans 24 hours
- John Jervis — admiral of the fleet and patron of Nelson
- Sarah Kane — playwright
- Laurence King — architect
- Sonja Kristina — singer
- Jodie Marsh — glamour model
- Dave McPherson — musician
- William Merrifield — Canadian soldier, recipient of the Victoria Cross
- Noel Moore — civil servant
- Stephen Moyer — actor
- Jeff Randall — journalist
- Logan Sama — grime DJ
- Thomas Skinner — businessman and contestant on The Apprentice
- Ellie Taylor — comedian
- Paul Wickens — musician

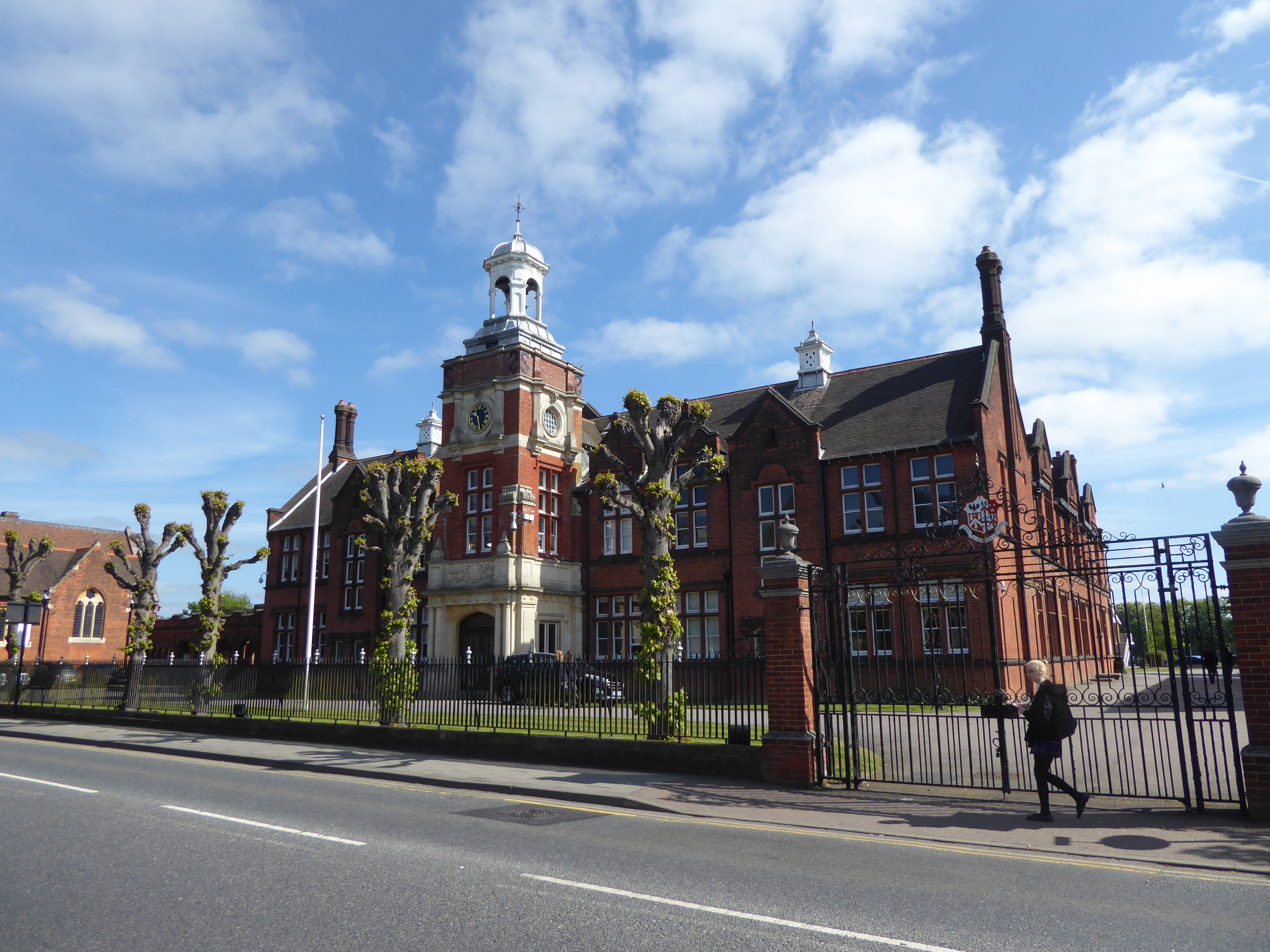
Brentwood School, established in 1558, has been attended by a number of famous pupils

Brentwood School pupils:

- Douglas Adams — writer
- Robin Day — British political broadcaster and commentator
- Noel Edmonds — television presenter
- Frank Lampard — footballer
- Eddie Hearn — sports promoter
- Griff Rhys Jones — actor
- Jack Straw — politician who served as Home Secretary and Foreign Secetary
