= Coxtie Green =

Settlement in Essex, England

Coordinates: 51.641°N 0.256°E

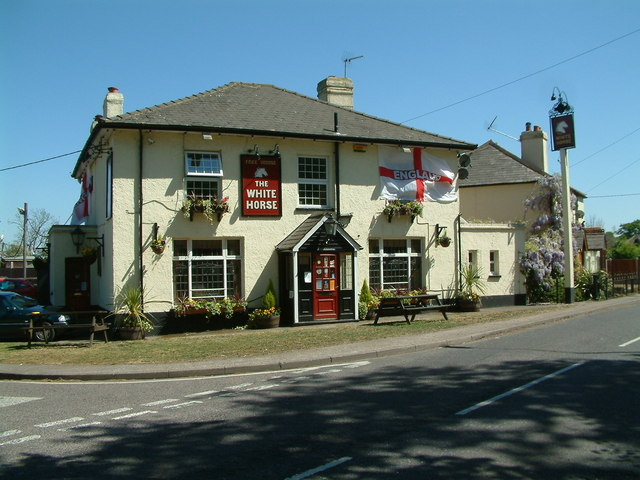
The White Horse public house, Coxtie Green

Coxtie Green is a small settlement in the Borough of Brentwood in Essex, England.

It was a settlement in the parish of South Weald.
