= Trampolining =

Acrobatic sport

Trampoline gymnastics
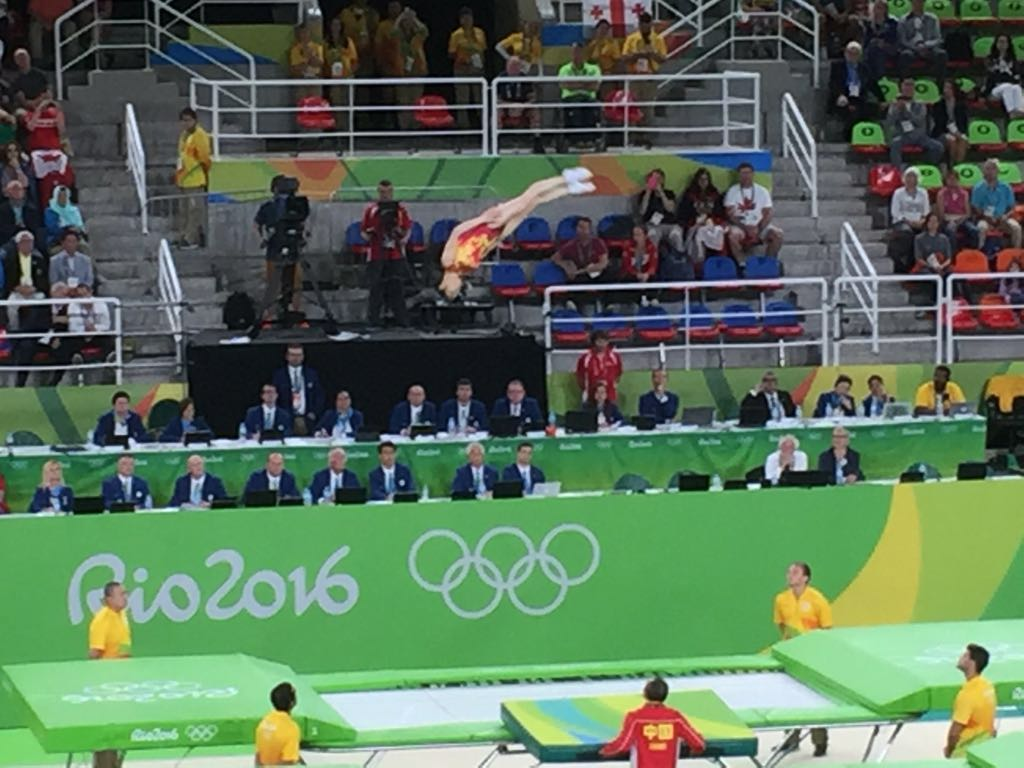
- Jumping on a competition trampoline at the 2016 Summer Olympics
- Highest governing body: World Gymnastics
- First contested: United States, 1930s

Characteristics
- Contact: No
- Mixed-sex: No
- Type: Gymnastic sport

Presence
- Country or region: Worldwide
- Olympic: Since 2000
- World Games: 1981 – 2025

Trampolining, or trampoline gymnastics, is a competitive Olympic sport in which athletes perform acrobatics while bouncing on a trampoline. In competition, these can include simple jumps in the straight, pike, tuck, or straddle positions to more complex combinations of forward and/or backward somersaults and twists. Scoring is based on the difficulty and on the total time spent in the air; points are deducted for poor execution and horizontal displacement (landing away from the center of the trampoline bed).

Trampoline gymnastics can be classified into a sub-category of gymnastics known as Trampoline and Tumbling, or TNT, which includes the events of individual trampoline, synchronised trampoline, double mini trampoline, and tumbling. Of these, only individual trampoline is represented at the Olympics.

== Origins ==
In the early 1930s, George Nissen observed trapeze artistes performing tricks when bouncing off a safety net. He made the first modern trampoline in his garage to reproduce this on a smaller scale and used it to help with his diving and tumbling activities. He formed a company to build trampolines for sale and used a variant of the Spanish word trampolín (diving board) as a trademark. He used the trampoline to entertain audiences and also let them participate in his demonstrations as part of his marketing strategy. This was the beginning of a new sport.

In the United States, trampolining was quickly introduced into school physical education programs and was also used in private entertainment centers. Elsewhere in the world the sport was most strongly adopted in Europe and the former Soviet Union. Since trampolining became an Olympic sport in 2000, many more countries have started developing programs.

== Basic landing positions ==
Competitive trampolining routines consist of combinations of 10 contacts with the trampoline bed combining varying rotations, twists and shapes with take-off and landing in one of four positions:

- Feet
- Seat (with legs outstretched and hands down beside the hips)
- Front
- Back

A routine must always start and finish on feet. In addition to the 10 contacts with the bed in a routine, competitors must start their routine within 60 seconds after receiving a signal from the judges to avoid incurring a penalty. They are also permitted up to one "out bounce", a straight jump to remain controlled at the end of a routine, before sticking the landing. The trampolinist must stop completely—this means that the bed must stop moving as well—and they have to hold still for a count of 3 seconds before moving.

== Basic shapes ==
In competitions, moves must be performed in one of the following 3 basic shapes:

Shape	Method
Tucked	with knees pulled into to the chest by hands
Piked	folded at the hip joint with legs straight and hands holding the ankles or legs
Straight	body in a straight position with legs together and arms by the sides

Tucked is considered the least difficult shape in which to perform a skill, and straight the most difficult.

A fourth 'shape', known as 'puck' because it appears to be a hybrid of pike and tuck, is often used in multiple twisting somersaults—it is typically used in place of a 'tuck' and in the competition would normally be judged as an open tuck shape.

A straddle or straddled pike is a variant of a pike with arms and legs spread wide. It is only recognized as a move as a shaped jump, and not in any somersault moves.

Rotation is performed about the body's longitudinal and lateral axes, producing twists and somersaults respectively. Twists are done in multiples of a half and somersaults in multiples of a quarter. For example, a barani ball out move consists of a take-off from the back followed by a tucked 1¼ front somersault combined with a ½ twist, to land on feet. Rotation around the dorso-ventral axis is also possible (producing side-somersaults and "turntables"), but these are not generally considered to be valid moves within competitions and carry no difficulty value.

Trampoline skills can be written in FIG (Federation Internationale de Gymnastique) shorthand notation. FIG shorthand consists of one digit signifying the number of quarter rotations, followed by digits representing the number of half twists in each somersault, and a symbol representing the position of the skill. "/" represents a straight position, "<" represents a piked position, and "ο" represents a tucked position. For example, 41/ is a front somersault with a half twist in the straight position, 800ο is a double back somersault in the tucked position with no twists, and 821/ is a double front somersault with a full twist in the first somersault and a half twist in the second somersault, performed in a straight position.

== Competition ==
=== Individual ===
Programme cover from first World Championships showing Rob Walker outside Houses of Parliament

The first individual trampolining competitions were held in colleges and schools in the US and then in Europe. In the early years of competition there was no defined format with performers often completing lengthy routines and even remounting if falling off partway through. Gradually competitions became more codified such that by the 1950s the 10-bounce routine was the norm thereby paving the way for the first World Championships which were organised by Ted Blake of Nissen and held in London in 1964. The first World Champions were both American, Dan Millman and Judy Wills Cline. Kurt Baechler of Switzerland and Ted Blake of England were the European pioneers and the first ever televised National Championships were held in England in 1958.

Soon after the first World Championships, an inaugural meeting of prominent trampolinists was held in Frankfurt to explore the formation of an International Trampoline Federation. In 1965 in Twickenham, the Federation was formally recognised as the International Governing Body for the sport. In 1969, the first European Championship was held in Paris and Paul Luxon of London was the winner at the age of 18. The ladies winner was Ute Czech from Germany. From that time until 2010, European and World Championships have taken place in alternate years—the European in the odd and the World in the even. Now the World Championships are held annually.

In 1973, Ted Blake organised the first World Age Group Competition (WAG) in the newly opened Picketts Lock Sports Centre; these now run alongside the World Championships. Blake also used the first WAG as an opportunity to organise a World Trampoline Safety Conference which was held in the Bloomsbury Hotel, London, in order to codify safety concerns. There is also a World Cup circuit of international competitions which involves a number of competitions every year. There are also international matches between teams from several countries.

At first the Americans were successful at World Championship level, but soon European competitors began to dominate the sport and for a number of years, athletes from countries that made up the former Soviet Union have often dominated the sport. Germany and France have been the other strong nations in trampolining and the first four ranking places in World Trampolining used to go to USSR, France, Britain and Germany. In recent years, Canada has also produced Olympic medalists and World champions due in large part to contributions made to the sport by Dave Ross. Ross pioneered the sport in Canada almost 30 years ago and has consistently produced Olympic and World Cup athletes and champions. Since trampolining became an Olympic sport, China has also made a very successful effort to develop world-class trampoline gymnasts, with their first major success being a gold medal in the 2007 Men's World Championship. The next year, at the 2008 Olympic Games held in Beijing, they won gold in both the men's and women's competitions, and also won bronze in the men's. Since then, they have won multiple world and Olympic medals, including winning gold in every men's World Championships since 2007, other than 2022, which was won by Dylan Schmidt of New Zealand.

=== Synchronized ===
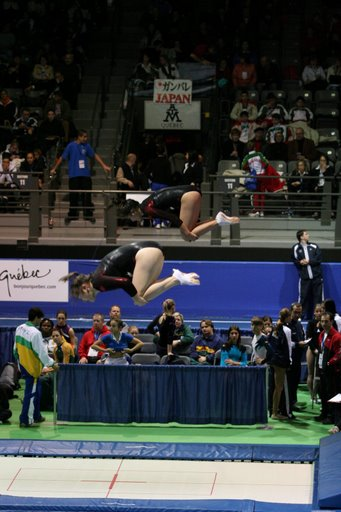
Female synchronized trampoline performance

In synchronized trampolining, two athletes perform exactly the same routine of ten skills at the same time on two adjacent trampolines. Each athlete is scored separately by a pair of judges for their execution in the same manner as for individual competitions, except that execution scores in synchronised competitions are taken as the average of the two median judges' scores, rather than summing the two median scores as in individual competitions. Scores for synchronicity and horizontal displacement are determined by a computer system using HDTS (Horizontal Displacement, Time of flight, and Synchronicity) plates under the corners of the trampoline, which contain pressure sensors. The same HDTS system is used to determine scores for time of flight and horizontal displacement in individual competitions. Fewer points are deducted for synchronicity if the pair are bouncing at the same height at the same time. The degree of difficulty of the routine is determined in the same way as for individual trampoline routines and the points added to the score to determine the winner.

=== Double mini ===
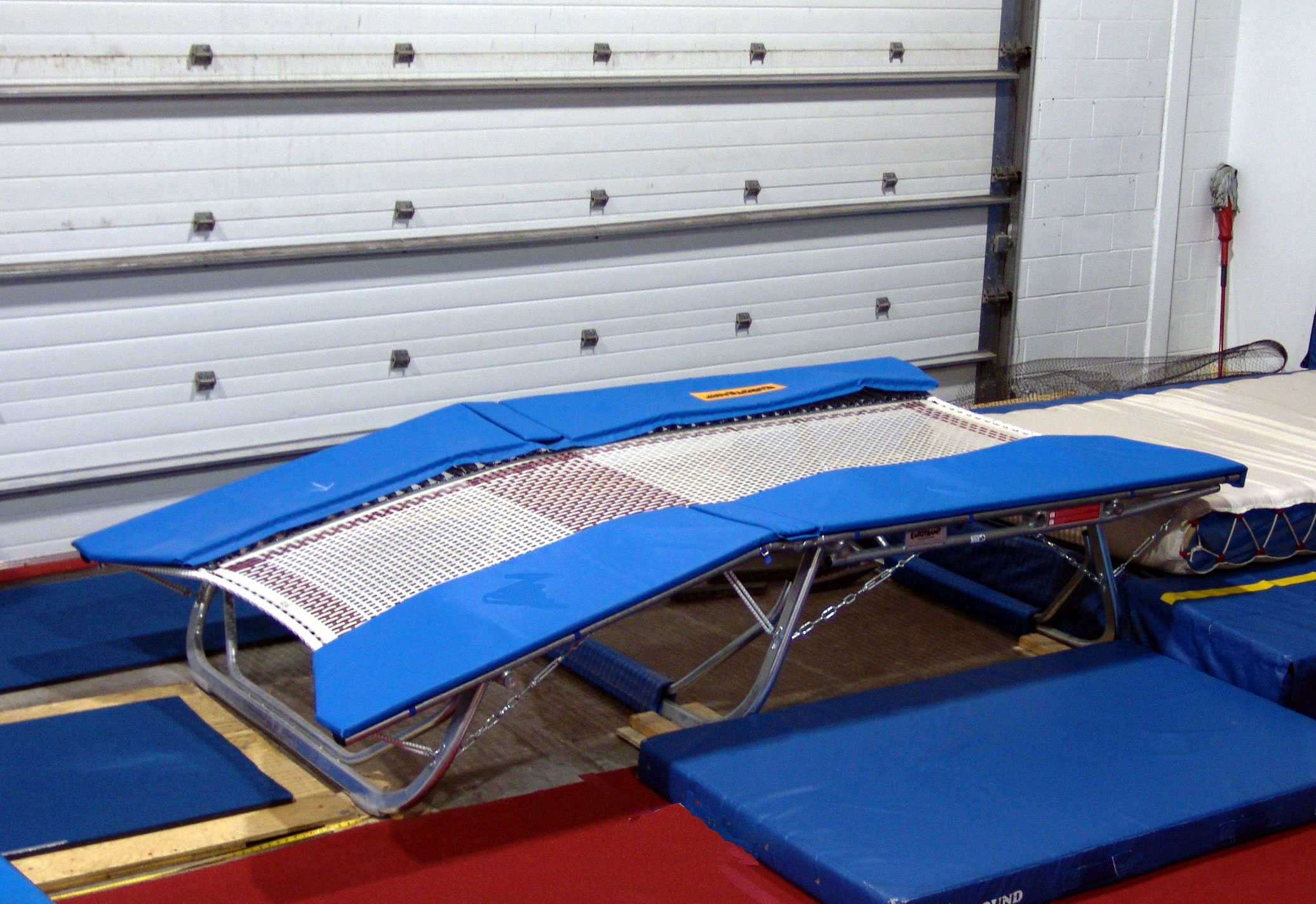
Double mini trampoline in a training gym

A double mini trampoline is smaller than a regulation competition trampoline. It has a sloped mount section and a flat top section. The gymnasts run up, jump onto the mount section and then jump from the mount section onto the flat part, before dismounting onto a mat.

A double mini trampoline pass (or routine) consists of two skills. The first skill is performed either from the mount to the flat section or, if a straight jump was performed from the mount, a skill is then performed on the flat section, landing back on the trampoline, before dismounting. The second skill is performed as a dismount from the top of the equipment onto the landing area. These skills are the same as those performed from feet to feet on a regular trampoline, except that there is forward movement along the double mini trampoline.

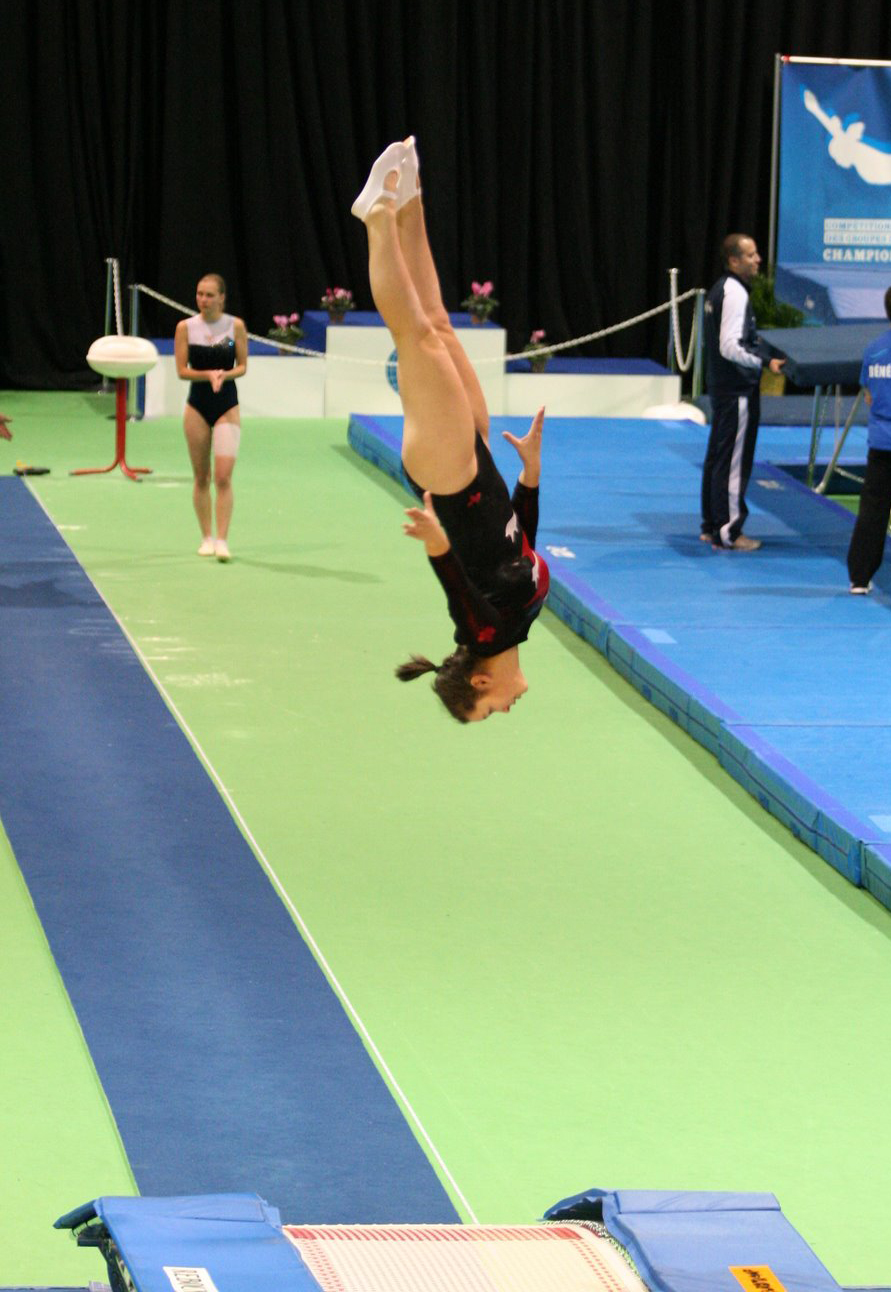
A double mini-trampoline competitor

Execution and difficulty are judged in a similar manner as for trampolining, but there are additional deductions for failing to land cleanly (without stepping) or landing outside a designated area on the mat. There are no scores for horizontal displacement or time of flight in double mini trampoline.

=== Tumbling ===
Tumbling gymnastics is another discipline of gymnastics competed at national and international events, usually alongside trampoline events. Instead of a sprung trampoline, competitors do a single, long complex tumbling and somersaulting combination along a straight, sprung runway, leading to a high final somersault onto a landing mat. The skills involved are very similar to those used in floor exercise or vault routines in artistic gymnastics, but with an extra emphasis on continuity and directional accuracy than in either of those events.

Tumbling is not an Olympic Games event but has been held as part of the European Games, as well as individual World and Continental Championships.

=== Format ===
The International Trampoline Federation became part of the Fédération Internationale de Gymnastique in 1999. FIG is now the international governing body for the sport which is paired with tumbling as the skill sets overlap. International competitions are run under the rules of FIG. Individual national gymnastics organizations can make local variations to the rules in matters such as the compulsory and optional routines and number of rounds for national and local competitions.

As part of the agreement to merge FIT with FIG, individual trampolining was accepted into the Summer Olympic Games for 2000 as an additional gymnastic sport.

The currently accepted basic format for individual trampoline competitions usually consists of two routines in qualification, one of which may involve a compulsory set of skills (most commonly found in junior or age group competitions), and one routine in each subsequent round of competition. In senior competitions, gymnasts have the opportunity to perform two routines in the first qualification round, from which only their highest-scoring routine is counted.

The routines are performed on a standard 14-foot-by-7-foot regulation-sized trampoline with a central marking. Each routine consists of the athlete performing ten different skills starting and finishing on the feet.

=== Scoring ===
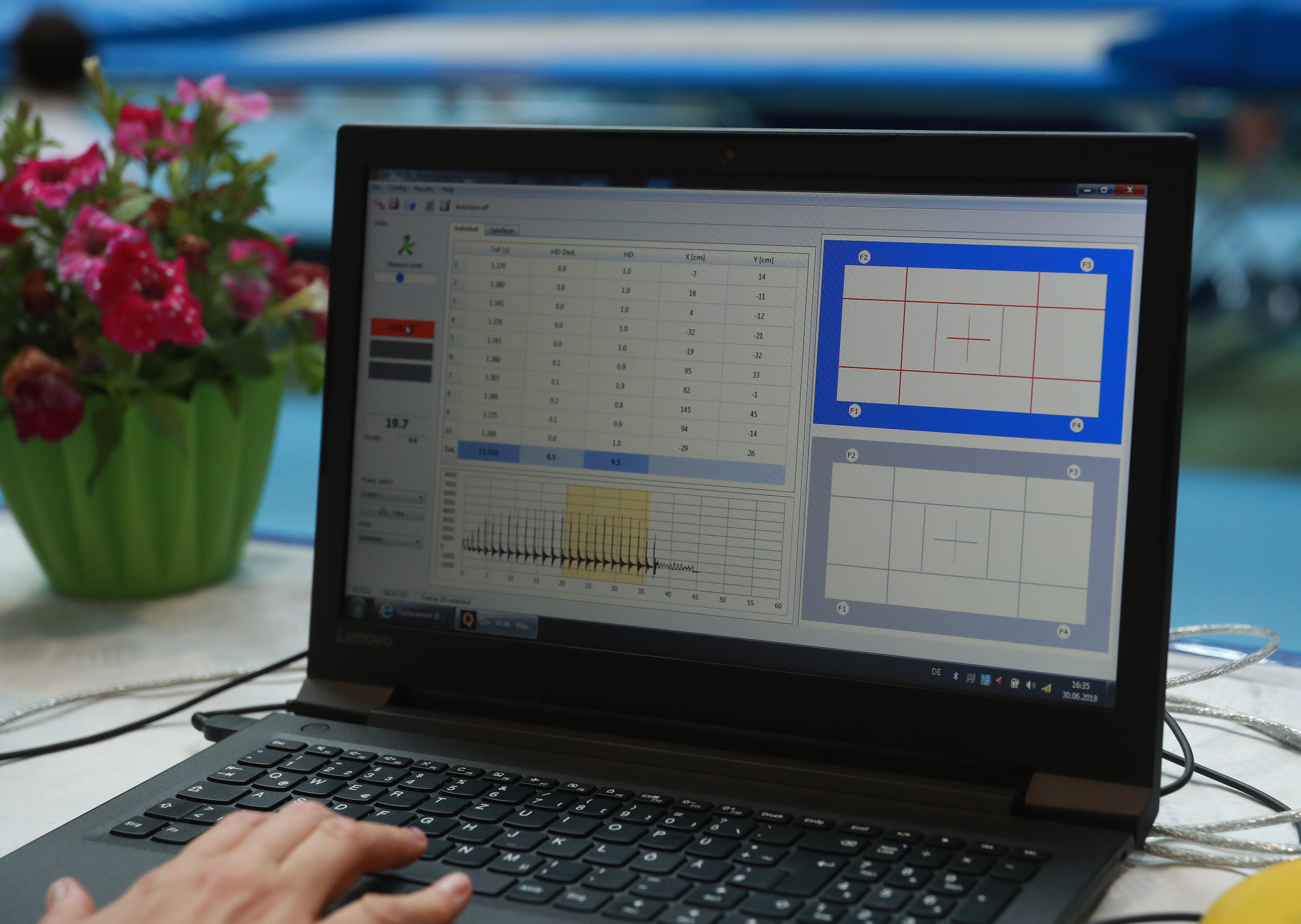
Computer-assisted scoring

The routine is marked out of 10 by five judges with deductions for incomplete moves or poor form. Usually, the highest and lowest scores are discarded. Additional points can be added depending on the difficulty of the skills being performed. The degree of difficulty (DD or tariff) is calculated by adding a factor for each half turn (or twist) or quarter somersault. Difficulty is important in a routine, however, there are differences in opinion between various coaches whether it is better to focus on increasing the difficulty of routines given that this usually results in a reduced form score or to focus on improving execution scores by displaying better form in an easier routine.

A "Time of Flight" (ToF) score was added to the overall score from 2010. This benefits athletes who can maintain greater height during their routines. "Time of Flight" is the time spent in the air from the moment the athlete leaves the trampoline bed until the time they make contact again, and is measured with electronic timing equipment. The score given is the sum the time in seconds of all completed jumps in the routine. This is now mainly in all competitions, including Club, County, and Regional, as it is a key factor in judging.

In 2017, the method of determining the horizontal displacement from the centre was changed, new markings were added to the bed and zones set up with deductions based on the distance from the centre of the trampoline bed. The score is determined by a deduction which is the sum of all the landing zone deductions subtracted from 10. The displacement is measured electronically where the equipment is available, or else by two judges observing the landing zones.

The total score is a combination of the degree of difficulty (DD) performed plus the total Time of Flight (ToF) minus standardized deductions for poor form and mistakes and the horizontal displacement.

=== Score records ===
The official world record for the highest degree of difficulty (DD) for men at a World Gymnastics sanctioned event is 24.3, achieved by Gabriel Albuquerque on 5th November 2026 in the first qualification round of the 39th Trampoline & Tumbling World Championships in Nanjing, China. This broke the previous record of 23.4, achieved by Hayato Miyano of Japan on 4th October 2026 in the men's final of the 6th AERE World Cup in Riccione, Italy, which was the first routine containing 10 triple somersaults to be competed by any gymnast. This, in turn, broke the previous record of 22.8 by Gabriel Albuquerque from the 7th WGYM Trampoline World Cup in Coimbra, Portugal, on 4th July 2026.

Previous records include 22.6 by Ruben Padilla at the FIG World Cup in Antibes, France, on 3rd October 2025, 18.9 (21.3 under the current difficulty rules, which commenced in 2025) by Ryusei Nishioka at the 35th FIG Trampoline World Championships in Baku, Azerbaijan on 21st November 2021, and 18.8 (20.9 under the current rules), achieved by Jason Burnett at the Nissen Cup in Arosa, Switzerland, on 12th June 2010. Burnett beat his own record of 18.0 (under the pre-2025 rules), set on 30th April 2010 at the Pacific Rim Championships in Melbourne, Australia. This, in turn, beat his previous world record of 17.5 that he had achieved on 2nd April 2007 at the Lake Placid, New York, Trampoline World Cup. Burnett beat the twenty-year-old record of 17.0 by Igor Gelimbatovsky (USSR, 1986) and Daniel Neale (GBR, 1999). The top men's competitors usually perform routines with at least 5 triple somersaults. In 2009 Jason Burnett completed a training routine with a DD of 20.6 at Skyriders Trampoline Place in Canada.

The women's world record DD is 16.20 by Samantha Smith (CAN). The top women's competitors usually perform routines with at least one, and usually two, triple somersaults. The women's synchronised trampoline pair of Karen Cockburn and Rosannagh Maclennan also of Canada completed a new world record DD of 14.20 at the same World Cup on 2nd April 2007 in Lake Placid.

The highest overall single-exercise score ever achieved in international competition is 67.29, achieved by Ivan Litvinovich at the 2025 Trampoline World Championships in Pamplona, Spain. The highest women's score in international competition is 59.35, achieved by Iana Lebedeva in the first qualification round of the 39th Trampoline & Tumbling World Championships in Nanjing, China on 5th November 2026. With this, Lebedeva broke her own record of 58.96 from the 2025 Trampoline World Championships in Pamplona, Spain.

==== Men's difficulty records ====
Athlete	National Federation	Date	Location	Difficulty (2025-present)	Difficulty (pre-2025 rules)
Gabriel Albuquerque	Portugal	5th November 2026	Nanjing, China	24.3	20.8
Hayato Miyano	Japan	4th October 2026	Riccione, Italy	23.4	20.7
Gabriel Albuquerque	Portugal	4th July 2026	Coimbra, Portugal	22.8	19.5
Ruben Padilla	USA	3rd October 2025	Antibes, France	22.6	19.3
Ryusei Nishioka	Japan	21st November 2021	Baku, Azerbaijan	21.3	18.9
Jason Burnett	Canada	12th June 2010	Arosa, Switzerland	20.9	18.8

==== Women's difficulty records ====
Athlete	National Federation	Date	Location	Difficulty (2025-present)	Difficulty (pre-2025 rules)
Samantha Smith	Canada	9th July 2016	Coimbra, Portugal	17.2	16.2

==== Men's score records (2025-present) ====
Score	Athlete	National Federation	Date	Location
67.290	Ivan Litvinovich	AIN	6th November 2025	Pamplona, Spain
66.390	Ivan Litvinovich	AIN	6th April 2025	Riccione, Italy
66.230	Ivan Litvinovich	AIN	23rd February 2025	Baku, Azerbaijan

==== Men's score records (pre-2025) ====
Score	Athlete	National Federation	Date	Location
63.420	Ivan Litvinovich	AIN	2nd August 2024	Pamplona, Spain
63.295	Gao Lei	China	2017	Loule, Portugal
62.990	Dong Dong	China	2012	London, UK

=== Safety ===
Although trampoline competitors are highly trained, they are also attempting to perform complex manoeuvres which could lead to accidents and falls. Trampolines used in competitions have their springs covered in pads to reduce the chance of injury when landing off the bed. They also have padded end decks, which are the locations that athletes are most likely to fall off the trampoline. The rules for international competitions (updated by FIG in 2006) also require 200mm thick mats on the floor for 2 metres around each trampoline and for there to be four spotters whose task it is to attempt to catch or reduce the impact of an athlete falling off the side of the trampoline bed. The floor matting rules are typically adopted by national bodies but not always in full; for example, in the UK the requirement for National & Regional competition is still 2m but only of 20–25mm matting.

Teenage trampoline athletes are at higher risk of injury with higher training loads.

Among Olympic athletes at the 2008, 2012, and 2016 games, the injury rate for trampoline gymnasts was about half that for artistic gymnasts.
