= South Weald Camp =

Univallate hillfort in Essex, England

Coordinates: 51.6284°N 0.2798°E

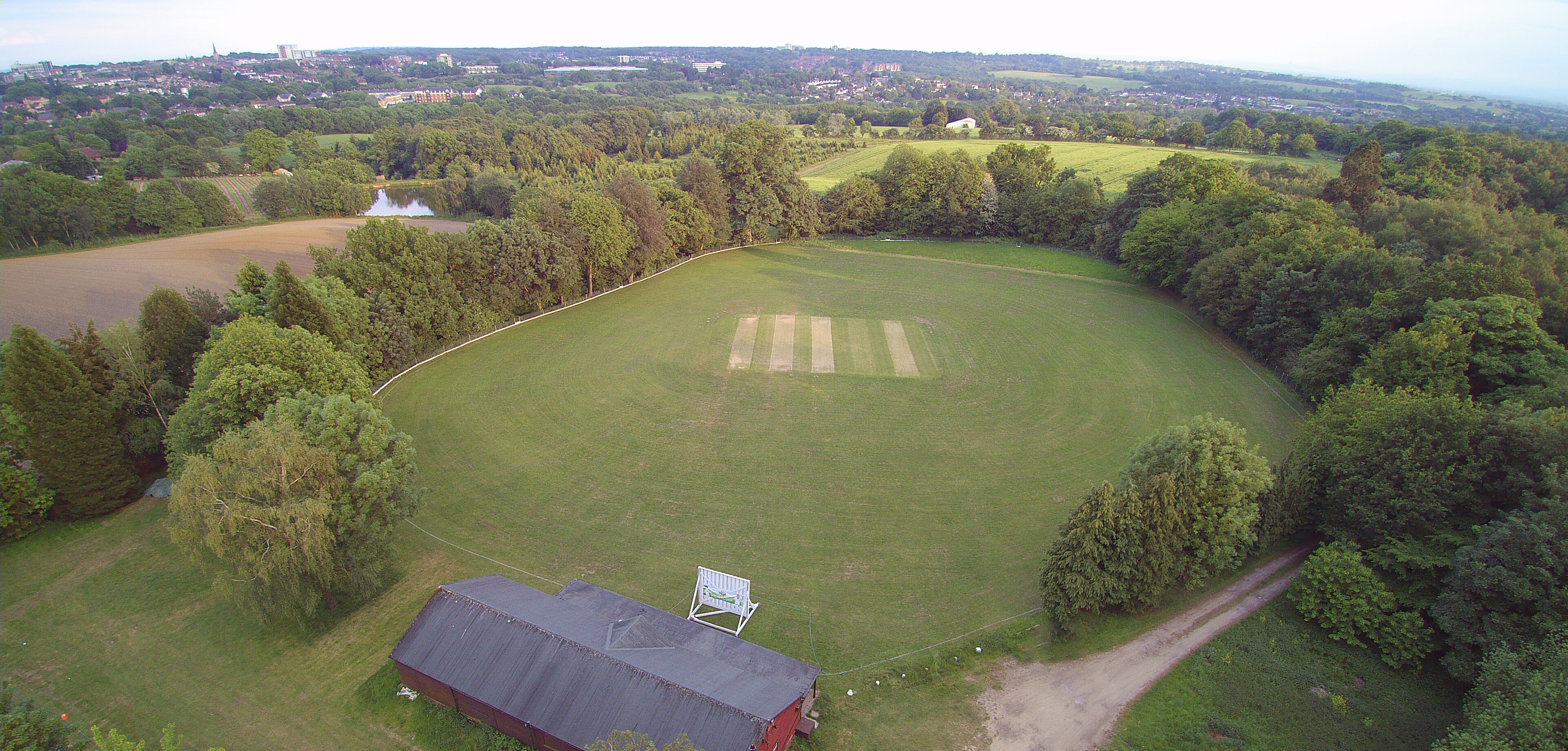
Site of South Weald Camp, much of the eastern part now occupied by a cricket pitch. The hillfort extends to the right of this south-facing image, covered by woodland.

South Weald Camp was a hillfort based in South Weald, Brentwood, Essex, England. Roughly circular in plan, the fort covered 2.8 hectares (6.9 acres), with a suggested construction date in the late Iron Age, from the 1st century BC to the 1st century AD. The location is associated in this period with the Catuvellauni and the Trinovantes.

The camp's defences consisted of a rampart and steep banked slope, with traces of an external ditch. Although for a long time after the Iron Age, the Camp didn't have much use, in the medieval period the fort was used as part of a deer-park and then later used as a WWII training ground. Nowadays, a road (Sandpit Lane) runs roughly north-south through the fort dividing it somewhat unequally with roughly a third to the west falling into Weald Country Park and two-thirds to the east occupied by South Weald Cricket Club.

== Archaeology ==
Two studies of the hillfort were reported in 1995; Isserlin 1995 is an analytical field survey of South Weald and another hillfort, and Medlycott et al. 1995 reports the results of two trenches excavated in 1990 at points to the north-west and south-west across the rampart and ditches. Their findings inform contemporary understanding of the Camp, and identify four main periods of activity at the site.

=== Iron Age hillfort ===
Lock and Ralston, in their Atlas of Hillforts of Britain and Ireland, describe South Weald Camp as a slight univallate hillfort lying 300 metres (980 ft) to the west of Calcott Hall Farm within South Weald Country Park. The camp occupies a slight hillslope at approximately 98 metres (322 ft) to 102 metres (335 ft) above sea level. A road running S-NNW cuts the ramparts, beyond which the western side lies within woodland. Almost circular in plan it comprises a single bank and external ditch enclosing approximately 2.8 hectares (6.9 acres). It survives as a slight earthwork in the west. Between the internal bank and external ditch the scarp slope has been modified and is up to 3m high. Elsewhere the levelled bank is indicated only as a slight break in slope. The ditch is now partially in-filled in places, but elsewhere it survives as a buried feature. Two trenches excavated in 1990 (Medlycott et al. 1995) showed it to be 3.4 metres (11 ft) wide and 1.4 metres (4 ft 7 in) deep with steep sides which tapered to an approximately 1.5 metres (4 ft 11 in) wide flattened bottom. Silts at the bottom of the ditch were considered to have formed under waterlogged conditions shortly after the ditch was dug. A limited number of pottery sherds recovered from near the base of the ditch were dated 1st century BC-1st century AD, suggesting it was constructed in the late Iron Age. The ditch was recut between the 10th and 12th centuries AD. One entrance survives in the south with a slightly in-turned terminal in the east (Isserlin 1995, 44). Behind the rampart a linear slot from which charcoal, burnt clay and burnt stones were recovered, was interpreted as a possible revetment slot. An oval posthole and further postholes running at right angles and parallel to the rampart were also recorded. A cricket ground and pavilion now lies inside in the north-east.

=== Medieval period ===
There is evidence that during the medieval period much of the ditch was 'reformed' to fit another purpose. Isserlin suggests that the plan of the iron age earthwork was used as hedging forming the boundary of a deerpark, with additional earthworks added to the west to incorporate a pond within the park complex.

=== 16th–20th century ===
The deer park at South Weald continued in use up to 1939; but sites to the north-west have been quarried for sand and gravel, very possibly to provide metalling construction materials for turnpikes or later roads. The park became part of the land of Weald Hall, and there is evidence of widespread landscape gardening including, presumably, removal or flattening of some of the fort's ramparts.

=== 20th–21st century ===
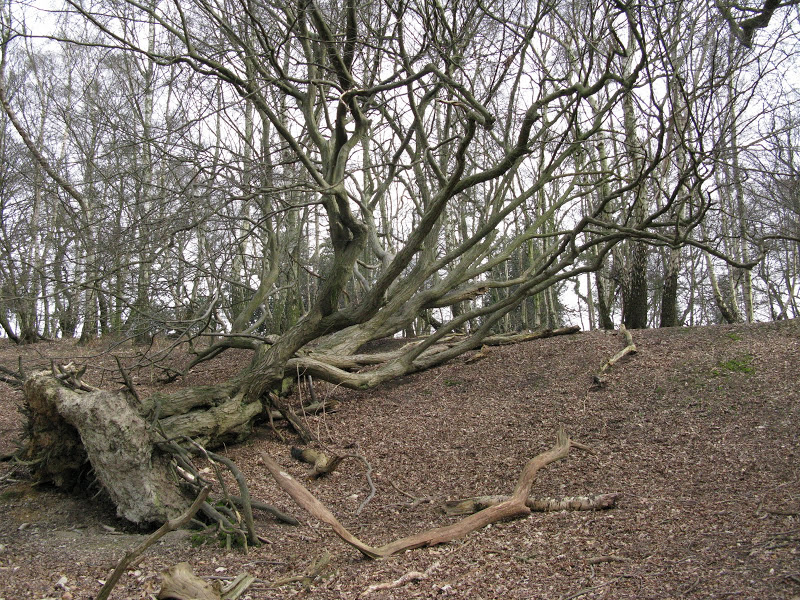
Part of the western remains of the hill-fort located in South Weald Country Park. The hillfort extends out from this image covering some of the cricket ground nearby.

During the Second World War the area was used as both a military training ground as well as allotment fields. This had a severe impact causing extensive damage on both the archaeology of the site and the surviving earthwork. In 1975, a gas main was installed across the section owned by the cricket ground, but no structures or finds were reported. In 1990, Essex County Council gave permission for a small research excavation to be undertaken on the western portion of the earthwork (Weald Country Park) under the general direction of Owen Bedwin, with day-to-day supervision by Steve Godbold and the writing of the report (and much of this article) Maria Medlycott. During which, several objects were found including burnt clay, worked flint and pottery.

Post-war, the east of the site has been levelled to provide for a cricket pitch, and only slight landforms are still evident in the west.

== Scheduling ==
South Weald Camp was listed as a Scheduled Monument in January 1955, on the basis of the general rarity in the UK of slight univallate hillforts, as well as their specific rarity in the east of England. The listing conjectures that (despite the ditch-infilling and general state of the site) South Weald holds the potential for the recovery of further archeological remains, and specifies that the site is of national importance.
