= Brook Street, Essex =

Suburb of Brentwood, Essex, England

Coordinates: 51.6114°N 0.2732°E

Brook Street
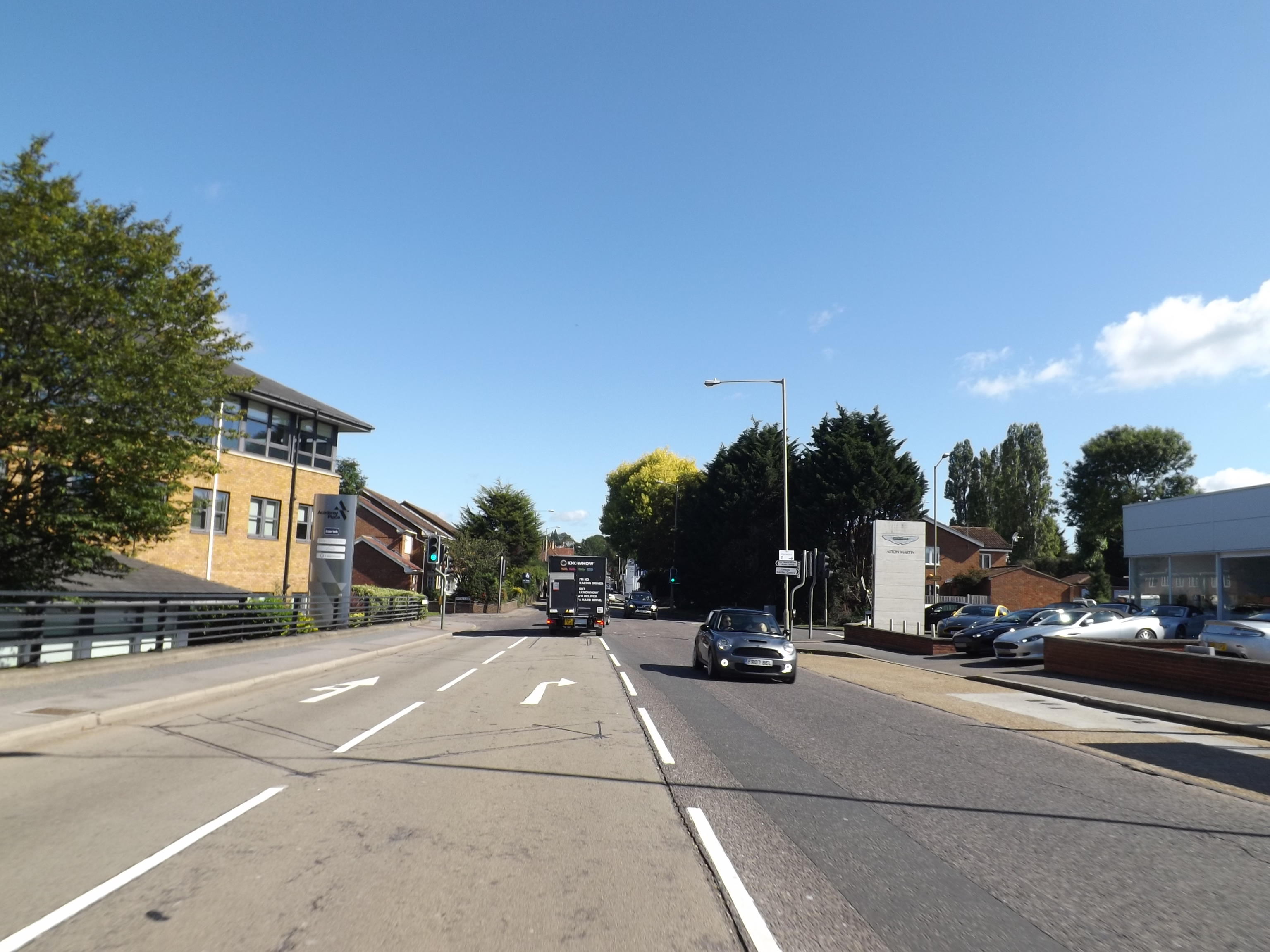

- Location within Essex
- District: Brentwood
- Shire county: Essex
- Region: East
- Country: England
- Sovereign state: United Kingdom
- Police: Essex
- Fire: Essex
- Ambulance: East of England

Brook Street is a residential suburb of Brentwood in the English county of Essex. Historically it was a hamlet in the civil parish of South Weald.

It constitutes the A1023 from the end of London Road, which leads down from Brentwood town centre to the Brook Street Interchange, a junction of the A12 & M25.

The public house known as the Nags Head dates from the 18th century and gave its name to Nags Head Lane. Other buildings from that period are the Bull and the Golden Fleece. The later has an original hammerbeam hall roof still visible in the vestibule of the dining room. The site of a lepers' hospital was on the corner with Spital Lane. The Stone House – built from brick, stone and flint – is of a more recent date, but there is a row of 18th-century cottages close by.
