= Warley Hospital =

- South Essex Partnership University NHS Foundation Trust
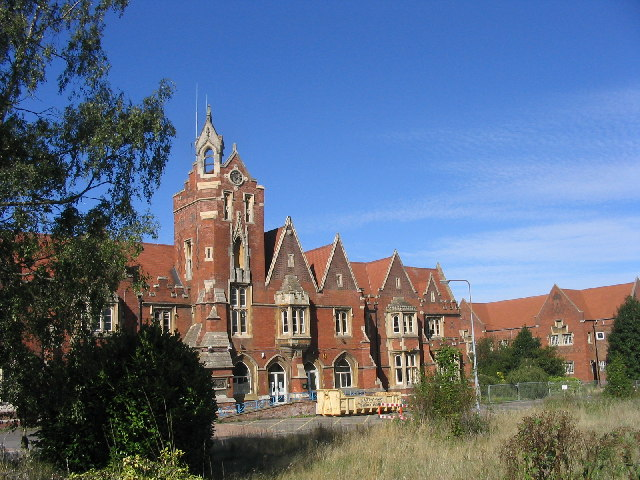
- Warley Hospital

- Shown in Essex

Geography
- Location: Brentwood, Essex, England
- Coordinates: 51.6073°N 0.2930°E

Organisation
- Care system: NHS
- Type: Specialist

Services
- Emergency department: No
- Speciality: Psychiatric

History
- Founded: 1853
- Closed: 2001

Links
- Lists: Hospitals in England

Warley Hospital was a psychiatric hospital located in Brentwood, Essex, England. The site has since been redeveloped as private residences.

== History ==
A site was identified within the Brentwood Hall Estate for the construction of an asylum. The asylum was designed by Kendall & Pope in the High Victorian Gothic style to a corridor plan layout. The foundation stone was laid on in October 1851 and the hospital was officially opened as the Essex County Lunatic Asylum in September 1853. Extensions included three country style homes in 1863, a new block for female patients in 1870 and another large block for male patients in 1888. A new chapel was added in 1889 and a new nurses' block in 1900.

The facility became the Brentwood Mental Hospital in 1920. Brentwood Hall, which had been declared unsafe, was rebuilt and reassigned as an occupational therapy department. Following these further enlargements, the hospital had 2,000 beds by 1937. Several minor buildings were damaged in bombing by the German Luftwaffe in 1940 during the Second World War. The facility joined the National Health Service in 1948 and became Warley Hospital in 1953.

After the introduction of Care in the Community in the early 1980s, the hospital went into a period of decline and eventually closed in 2001. A medium secure unit known as Mascalls Park Hospital remained on the site until 2011. This site has since been developed for residential use by Bellway as Mascalls Park. Meanwhile the asylum buildings have been converted to luxury homes by City and Country, known as The Galleries, and the surrounding grounds of the original hospital building were developed for residential use known as Clements Park.
