= Ted Blake =

British trampoline gymnast

- Full name: Terence Michael Blake
- Nickname: Ted Blake
- Born: 19 October 1921 London, England
- Died: 6 March 1998 (aged 76) Brentwood, England

Gymnastics career
- Discipline: Trampoline gymnastics
- Country represented: United Kingdom

Terence Michael Blake (19 October 1921 – 6 March 1998) was an early British trampoline pioneer.

Following the development of modern trampolines in the USA by George Nissen, Ted Blake was a major contributor to their continued development in the United Kingdom and in developing international competition for trampolining.

In his early years Blake went to the Latymer School in London and on leaving there held a variety of jobs before joining the army in 1939. During war years he trained as a Physical Training Instructor, transferring from the Essex Regiment to the Army Physical Training Corps in 1941 and rose to the rank of Company Sergeant Major Instructor (CSMI) by the time of his discharge in 1946. For most of his army life Blake was based at the Essex Regiment's depot at Brentwood.

Having left the army, Blake spent the next 3 years attending courses to become a teacher. Starting out at the Loxford School in Ilford, Essex in 1949 he soon introduced a single second-hand Nissen trampoline. Whilst at the Loxford School, Blake developed a trampoline squad of sufficient skill that they were invited to do a demonstration at the Festival of Britain in 1951. Blake remained at Loxford School until 1956 when he left to establish the UK operation of Nissen.

Blake subsequently became managing director for the Nissen UK business based at their factory in Hutton Industrial Estate, Brentwood, Essex. Together with Kurt Baechler of Switzerland, Blake was credited with the introduction of trampolining to Europe.

Being passionate about trampolining, he was involved in their commercial development and heavily involved in developing the modern competitive trampolining framework.

In 1964 Blake organised the first World Championships (financed by George Nissen) which were held in the Royal Albert Hall, London. That same year, following these first World Championships, he attended an inaugural meeting of prominent trampolinists in Frankfurt to discuss the formation of an International Trampoline Federation. This was launched as the (FIT) in Twickenham in 1965 and Blake became its first vice-president, a position he held until 1967. So influential was Blake at the time that three of the first four World Championships were organised by him and held in London - at this time they took place every year.

Having delivered at the Senior level, Blake continued to be heavily involved in promoting competition, and in 1973 working with Bob Bollinger and George Nissen created the World Age Group Competition, which now runs alongside the World Championships every two years.

Blake appeared, however, to not always be comfortable with authority and in 1972 was scathing about the FIT he had originally developed, questioning why it was so bureaucratic and gymnastics oriented in an international publication of that time.

One of few Britons so honoured, in 1976 he was recognised by the United States Trampoline & Tumbling Association for his major influence on developing modern trampolining by being added to their Hall of Fame.

Blake left Nissen in mid-1980 having spent many years staving off the pressure from Nissen's then-owners to cease manufacturing trampolines because of fears of litigation. They had previously ceased manufacture in USA many years before for this very reason. Blake continued to give talks and lectures, however and soon became a leading light in the UK Leisure Management Industry.
