= South Weald =

Area of Brentwood, Essex, England

Coordinates: 51.626°N 0.267°E

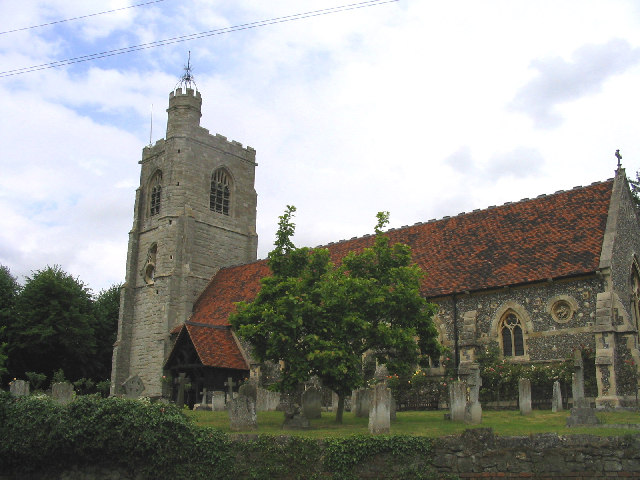
- St Peter's Church

- Location within Essex
- District: Brentwood
- Shire county: Essex
- Region: East
- Country: England
- Sovereign state: United Kingdom

South Weald is a village in the Borough of Brentwood in Essex, England. It lies 1.5 miles (2 km) west of the centre of Brentwood. The village is on the edge of the Weald Country Park. South Weald was formerly a parish, which included extensive surrounding rural areas and the settlements of Brentwood, Brook Street, Coxtie Green, and Pilgrims Hatch. Brentwood became a separate civil parish in 1866. The civil parish of South Weald was abolished in 1934 and its area absorbed into Brentwood.

== History ==
There is evidence of ancient settlement in the area. A hillfort, now known as South Weald Camp, stood to the north-east of the modern village. It appears to have been occupied around the 1st century BC and 1st century AD, during the Iron Age. The site is now a Scheduled Ancient Monument, part of which is occupied by South Weald Cricket Club.

The name 'Weald' comes from the Anglian dialect of Old English and means a forest, particularly one on higher ground. The 'South' distinguishes this one from North Weald, which lies 8 miles (13 km) to the north-west.

The Domesday Book of 1086 lists two estates or manors at the vill of Welda in the Hundred of Chafford in Essex. The larger manor was owned by Waltham Abbey. This manor had been granted to Waltham Abbey in 1062, and remained in its ownership until the abbey's dissolution in 1540.

No church or priest was recorded at South Weald in the Domesday Book, but it subsequently became a parish. The parish church, dedicated to St Peter, is known to have been built by the mid-12th century.

Although only two manors were recorded in Domesday Book, ownership of the area fragmented into several smaller manors in medieval times. The largest manor was also called South Weald, covering the village itself and the north-west of the larger parish of South Weald. This was the manor owned by Waltham Abbey. It was claimed by the crown on the dissolution of the abbey, and was subsequently sold into private ownership in the early 1540s. A new mansion called Weald Hall was built there shortly afterwards.

Weald Hall was extended and remodelled on several occasions, and its parkland was also gradually extended. The estate was broken and up into parcels and sold in 1946, and the house was demolished in 1951. Its former parkland of Weald Park is now a Registered Historic Park and Garden, covering some 212 hectares (524 acres). Some of the historic parkland remains in private ownership, but the main part was bought by Essex County Council in 1953 and converted a country park open to the public.

The village of South Weald lies 0.7 miles (1 km) north of the old Roman road from London to Colchester, which later became the A12. At the eastern end of the parish was Brentwood, at a crossroads on that main road. Brentwood had its own chapel of ease from 1221 and was granted a market charter in 1227. It subsequently grew to overtake South Weald village in size, becoming the largest settlement in the parish. From the 17th century onwards, parishes were given various civil functions under the poor laws. Such civil functions were administered separately for the chapelry of Brentwood and the rest of South Weald parish. Brentwood therefore became a separate civil parish from South Weald in 1866 when the legal definition of 'parish' was changed to be the areas used for administering the poor laws.

Other hamlets in the parish included Brook Street on the main road to the south of South Weald village, Pilgrims Hatch to the north-east of Weald Park, and Coxtie Green to the north of Weald Park. The area initially ceded from South Weald to the chapelry of Brentwood was modest; the whole ancient parish of South Weald comprised 5,088 acres (2,059 ha), of which just 459 acres (186 ha) comprised the chapelry and subsequent civil parish of Brentwood.

When elected parish and district councils were established in 1894, both the civil parishes of South Weald and Brentwood were included in the Billericay Rural District. Brentwood was removed from the rural district to become its own urban district in 1899. In 1934, the civil parish of South Weald was abolished and its area absorbed into the urban district of Brentwood. At the 1931 census (the last before the abolition of the civil parish), South Weald had a population of 6,370.

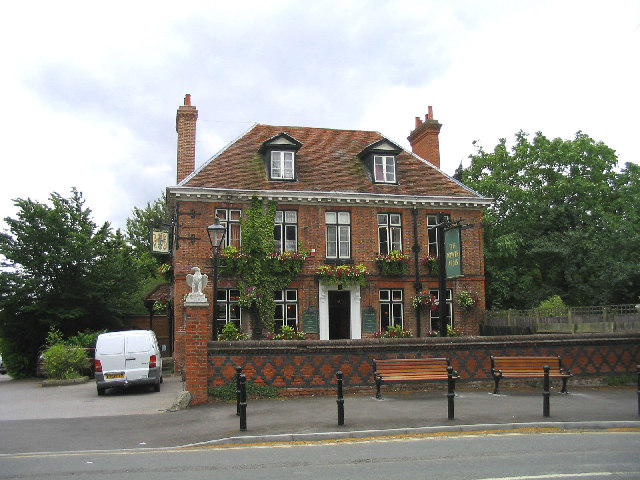
The Tower Arms

In South Weald village, the Tower Arms, with the date 1704 and the initials A.L.L.A. above the entrance, was called Jewells according to a map of 1788, when the Spread Eagle, an earlier name of the Tower Arms, was on the other side of the road, west of the church; in 1684 it was called the Eagle and Crown and said to adjoin the churchyard. On the curve opposite the church and down Vicarage Lane there is a variety of architecture, ranging from the sixteenth century house called Wealdcote to the Regency buildings of the old post office and its neighbour. Further down the lane the Old Vicarage, with the coat of arms of the Bishop of London at its entrance.
