= Hole Farm Community Woodland =

Community woodland and visitor centre

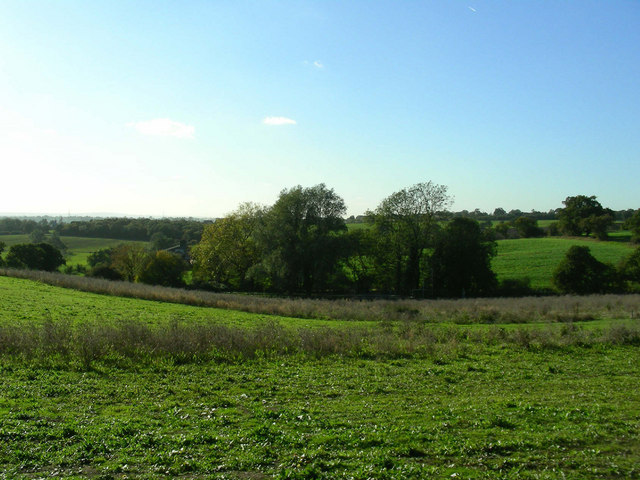
- Hole Farm taken in 2006
- Interactive map of Hole Farm Community Woodland

Geography
- Location: near Great Warley, Brentwood, Essex
- Coordinates: 51°35′05″N 0°17′13″E
- Area: 100 acres (40.5 ha)

Administration
- Established: 2024
- Authority: Forestry England

Hole Farm Community Woodland near Great Warley, Brentwood, Essex, is a 100-acre woodland and visitor centre developed by National Highways, in conjunction with Forestry England, as part of the environmental mitigations for the planned Lower Thames Crossing. The woodland was planned to open to the public in 2025, but National Highways announced it would open in Spring 2026.

== History ==
In June 2021, Highways England announced that they would develop the largest community woodland in the East of England as part of the Lower Thames Crossing, on the former Hole Farm that Highways England had purchased. The new 100 acre woodland was to be developed in partnership with Forestry England, with around 150,000 new native species trees planned to be planted to attract wildlife. This is an addition to an existing copse, Parker's Shaw. Hole Farm was planned to be connected to other nearby woodlands, such as Thorndon Park and Folkes Lane woodland via paths and cycleways. Forestry England would run a public consultation on the plans in August 2022. However, campaigners against the Lower Thames Crossing stated that the project, along with further tree planting schemes were greenwashing, and that the planned route would destroy irreplaceable ancient woodland. In late 2021, National Highways confirmed that the new woodland was not part of the Lower Thames Crossing, and it would go ahead regardless of the road project receiving permission or not.

Planning permission was submitted to Brentwood Borough Council for Hole Farm in 2023, with permission being granted in December 2023. Work on the site started in September 2024, with main contractor Balfour Beatty leading a team of local small and medium size business to build the infrastructure for the woodland visitor attractions including the access road, car park, walking paths, electric vehicle charging stations, ecological ponds and a café. These were to be built using carbon neutral construction methods with machinery and equipment powered by hydrogen, electric, and other low-carbon fuels. At the time of the construction work, 80,000 of the trees had already been planted, which had been started in November 2022 by Forestry England, with assistance from local schools and volunteers. The mix of trees was selected by Forest Research, the principal organisation for forestry and tree-related research in the United Kingdom, and includes species such as black poplar, oak, hazel and hornbeam. As part of the construction, the old grain store and barn at Hole Farm were demolished. In December 2024, National Highways announced the shortlisted designs to build a green footbridge across the A127 to help connect Hole Farm to the nearby Folkes Lane wood.

In January 2026, National Highways announced that the woodland would officially open in Spring 2026.

== Hole Farmhouse ==
Hole Farmhouse has been Grade II listed since 1979, and is 16th century or earlier hall house altered during the 17th century. The timber frame building is gabled and has a centre stack rising through front roof slope between eastern bays. Inside, some of the original framing can be seen, with clear evidence of the original hall and the insertion of the stack. On the 1838 tithe map, Hole Farm was shown as Holy Farm, which was owned by Edward Thomas and occupied by John Parker, and was part of the Coombe Lodge estate. John Parker died in 1847 and in the census of 1851, the property was recorded as being split into three cottages. However, by the 1871 census the property had been converted to two cottages. The farm remained part of the estate until it was broken up in 1971. Next to the Farmhouse is two brick cottages, with all properties remaining as residential within the new woodland.
