= Trampolining terms =

Terms used to describe trampolining

Trampolining terms are used to describe various positions and types of skill performed in the sport of trampolining.

== Basic skills ==
- Straight Jump – A vertical jump with the body held straight and arms in a straight line above the body at take-off.
- Tuck Jump – From a straight jump start, the knees are pulled up to the chest and the hands must at least briefly grasp the legs between the knees and ankle.
- Pike Jump – Again from a straight jump start, the legs are straight, held together and lifted parallel to the trampoline and the arms and body reach forwards towards the pointed toes.
- Straddle Jump – Similar to the pike jump except that the legs are spread sideways approximately 90° apart and the arms reach forward towards the pointed toes.
- Seat Drop or Seat Landing – Landing in a seated position with the legs straight. The hands support the body one either side and very slightly behind the posterior, palms down with fingers pointed towards the pointed toes.
- Seat Landing Half Twist to Seat Landing or Swivel Hips – Performing a seat landing, bounce up to a straight position (without landing) and then perform a half twist and land in the second seat landing facing in the opposite direction.
- Half Twist and Full Twist – While in a straight jump position rotating the body until facing the opposite direction for a half twist or a complete 360° rotation for a full twist.
- Stomach Drop, Front Drop or Front Landing – Landing horizontally on the bed, face down, with the arms bent to form a diamond shape with the hands overlapping slightly in front of the face. The legs should be bent slightly at the knee keeping the feet off the trampoline bed. But otherwise held in tension for a good landing.
- Back Drop or Back Landing – Landing on the bed on the back. The legs are bent up at about 90° on landing with legs held straight and the head is held in line with the body flat on the bed (to avoid whiplash injury).
- Hands and Knees 3/4 turnover – Bouncing on hands and knees then making a forward rotation to land in either Back Drop, to your feet or Seat Drop.
- Turntable – from front drop, bouncing, staying horizontal, performing a half twist around, then landing in front drop.
- Back drop half twist to back drop or Cradle – From back drop, bouncing up and rotating forwards, then performing a half twist, landing in back drop.

== Intermediate skills ==
- Front Somersault – One complete forward rotation; the body can be in any of the tucked, piked or straight (rarely seen other than to develop straight barani) positions.
- Back Somersault – One complete backward rotation; the body can be in any of the tucked, piked or straight positions.
- Side Somersault – One complete left or right rotation; this is usually performed tucked, but advanced variations include piked: straight legs (bent body). The straight position is impossible as the asymmetry will develop severe twisting and transform the side somersault into a back somersault.

== Advanced skills ==
- Barani – A front somersault with a half twist before landing; also known as a front-half.
- 3/4 front (Crash Dive) – Three-quarter straight front somersault that lands in the back drop position.
- 1 and 3/4 front (1 and 3, 217) – One and three quarter front somersault (performed in tucked or pike shape) that lands in the back drop position.
- 2 and 3/4 front (2 and 3, 317) – Two and three quarter front somersault that lands in the back drop position.
- 1 and 1/4 front – One and one quarter front somersault (performed in tucked or pike shape) that lands in the front drop position.
- 2 and 1/4 front – Two and one quarter front somersault that lands in the front drop position.
- 3/4 back (Lazy Back, Easy Back) – Three quarter straight back somersault that lands in front drop position.
- 1 and 3/4 back (Suicide) – One and three quarter back somersault that lands in front drop position.
- 1 and 1/4 back – One and one quarter back somersault (performed in tucked or pike shape) that lands in the back drop position.
- 2 and 1/4 back – Two and one quarter back somersault that lands in the back drop position.
- Pullover or backover – Three quarter back somersault from back drop position that lands on feet.
- Rebound – One full front somersault rotation from back drop position that lands on back drop position
- Ballout – One and one quarter front somersault from back drop position that lands on feet. Usually performed after Crash Dive.
- Cody – One and one quarter back somersault from front drop position that lands on feet. Usually performed after Lazy Back.
- Kaboom – Three quarter back somersault from back drop position that lands on feet following the heels being bounced off the canvas.
- Zack – Three quarter front somersault from front drop position that lands on feet following a 'kaboom'.
- Arabian – Early half twist into front somersault with initial take-off being consistent with backward rotation.
- Front Full – A full-twisting straight front somersault
- Rudolph (or Rudy) – A single straight front somersault with one and a half twists.
- Back Full (or Full) – A full-twisting straight back somersault.
- Full in or Full out – A double back somersault with a full twist in the first or second somersault respectively.
- Full in triff – A triple back somersault with a full twist in the first somersault.
- Full in quadriff – A quadruple back somersault with a full twist in the first somersault.
- Full out in – A triple back somersault with a full twist in the second somersault.
- Dub back full out – A triple back somersault with a full twist in the third somersault.
- Front Full in – A double front somersault with a full twist in the first somersault.
- Full in full out – A double back somersault with a full twist in each somersault. also called a full full
- Full in half out – A double front somersault with a full twist in the first and a half twist in the second.
- Full in Rudy out – A double Front somersault with a full twist in the first and a Rudy in the second.
- Miller – A double back somersault with three full twists in any somersault.
- Miller Plus/ Killer – A double back somersault with four full twists in any somersault.
- Miller Plus Plus/ Killer Plus/ Thriller – A double back somersault with five full twists in any somersault.
- Double Front – A double front somersault (may be performed in tuck or pike position).
- Double Back – A double back somersault (may be performed in tuck, pike, or straight position).
- Triple Front – A triple Front somersault.
- Triple Back – A triple back somersault.
- Quad Front – A quadruple front somersault.
- Quad Back – A quadruple back somersault.
- Quint Front – A quintuple front somersault.
- Quint Back – A quintuple back somersault
- Half In (Tsukahara) – A barani followed by a back somersault.
- Rudy In – A Rudy followed by a back somersault.
- Rudy Out – A double front somersault with one and a half twists in the second somersault.
- Fliffus – Double front somersault with at least one half twist.
- Triffus – Triple front somersault with at least one half twist.
- Quadriffus – Quadruple front somersault with at least one half twist.
- Randolph (or Randy) – A single front somersault with two and a half twists.
- Double Full – A single back somersault with two twists.
- Triple Full – A single back somersault with three twists.
- Quad Full – A single back somersault with four twists.
- Quint Full – A single back somersault with five twists.
- Sextuple Full – A single back somersault with six twists.
- Septuple Full – A single back somersault with seven twists.
- Octuple Full – A single back somersault with eight twists.
- Barani ballout (BBO) – the same as a Ball out, but with one half twist. May also be performed with varying degrees of twist: e.g. rudolph/randolph/adolph ballout.
- Adolph – A single front somersault with three and a half twists.
- Full Half – A double front somersault with one twist in the first and a half twist in the second.
- Full Rudy – A double front somersault with one twist in the first and one and a half twists in the second.
- Frydolph – A single front somersault with four and a half twists.
- Frydolph Plus/ wydolph – A single front somersault with five and a half twists.
- A note about twisting somersaults – although it is not impossible to associate different amount of twist with either front or back somersaults it is universal practice that front twisting somersaults will always have an odd half twist while back twisting somersaults will always have a round number of twists. This is to make it easier for the performer to 'spot' the bed prior to landing.
- Somersaults may be performed in one of four positions: tuck, pike, straight (or layout), and puck. The tuck position is considered the least difficult. Somersaults done in pike or straight position are more difficult, and each complete rotation is awarded a 0.1 bonus to Degree of Difficulty. Puck position is a body position intermediate between tuck and pike, and is used in multiple twisting somersaults.
- A note about drop tricks – Although they are not mentioned on the list there are many possible tricks from drop tricks (Cody, Ballout, Zach, Kaboom). A common example of these tricks is a Cody full in full out which is a Cody with a full rotation into a backflip with a full rotation. There are also some tricks that are possible with a drop trick but not a normal bounce. For example a nunuple backflip has never been done before but a nunuple kaboom has. These tricks are more commonly found in freestyle trampoline where competitors are also judged on there creativity rather than only their skills.
- Skiing tricks - these next tricks are usually done off axis, not allowed in traditional trampoline competitions and usually performed with a special tuck - a grab. They have a simple naming rule: first the trick and then how many degrees you’re rotating. For example, let’s say you’re doing a cork 720. Since it is a single flip (it would otherwise be a double or triple cork), 360 degrees are used for the flip rotation. Now there’s 360 degrees left for a twist. That means that a cork 720 is an off axis back full. Let’s say the trick is a double cork 1080. 720 degrees are used for the two flip rotations, since it is a double, and the remaining 360 are used for a twist. You are allowed to put the twist anywhere you want in the double flip, which means in trampoline terms a double cork 1080 could be an off axis full in, full out or half half. Now for the tricks.
- Cork - an off axis backflip/ twist. It does not need to be rotated over the head. When you add a lot of twists the cork tends to look like it isn’t a flip, but that’s not true
- Misty - an off axis frontflip/twist. This is the same as a cork but forward.
- Flatspin - an off axis combined sideflip/backflip. This is more of a flip than a cork 360.
- Shant - another name for the cork 360. This is more of a twist than a flatspin.
- Rodéo -
- Pistol flip - a double sideflip with a full twist in the middle. You have to let go of the tuck to do the twist and then you tuck again to do another sideflip.

== Competition Terms ==
- Degree of Difficulty (DD) or Tariff – A score added to the execution score which reflects the difficulty of the skills included in the routine.
- Voluntary or Optional Routine (Vol) – A routine comprising skills chosen by the athlete or coach to reflect their best performance. Usually the routine must have a minimum (and sometimes at lower skill levels, a maximum) degree of difficulty.
- Compulsory Routine (Set) – A routine which has a set list of skills and a set order which must be followed by all athletes in a competition. No degree of difficulty marks are given for this routine; the marks are purely for execution.
- Time of flight (ToF) – A score added to the execution score which reflects the time the gymnast spends in the air when performing the routine.
- Horizontal Displacement (HD score) – A score added to the total score. The score is calculated by how much the athlete is out of the "box" during the routine.
