= Thong, Kent =

Hamlet in Kent, England

Coordinates: 51.41°N 0.4041°E

Thong
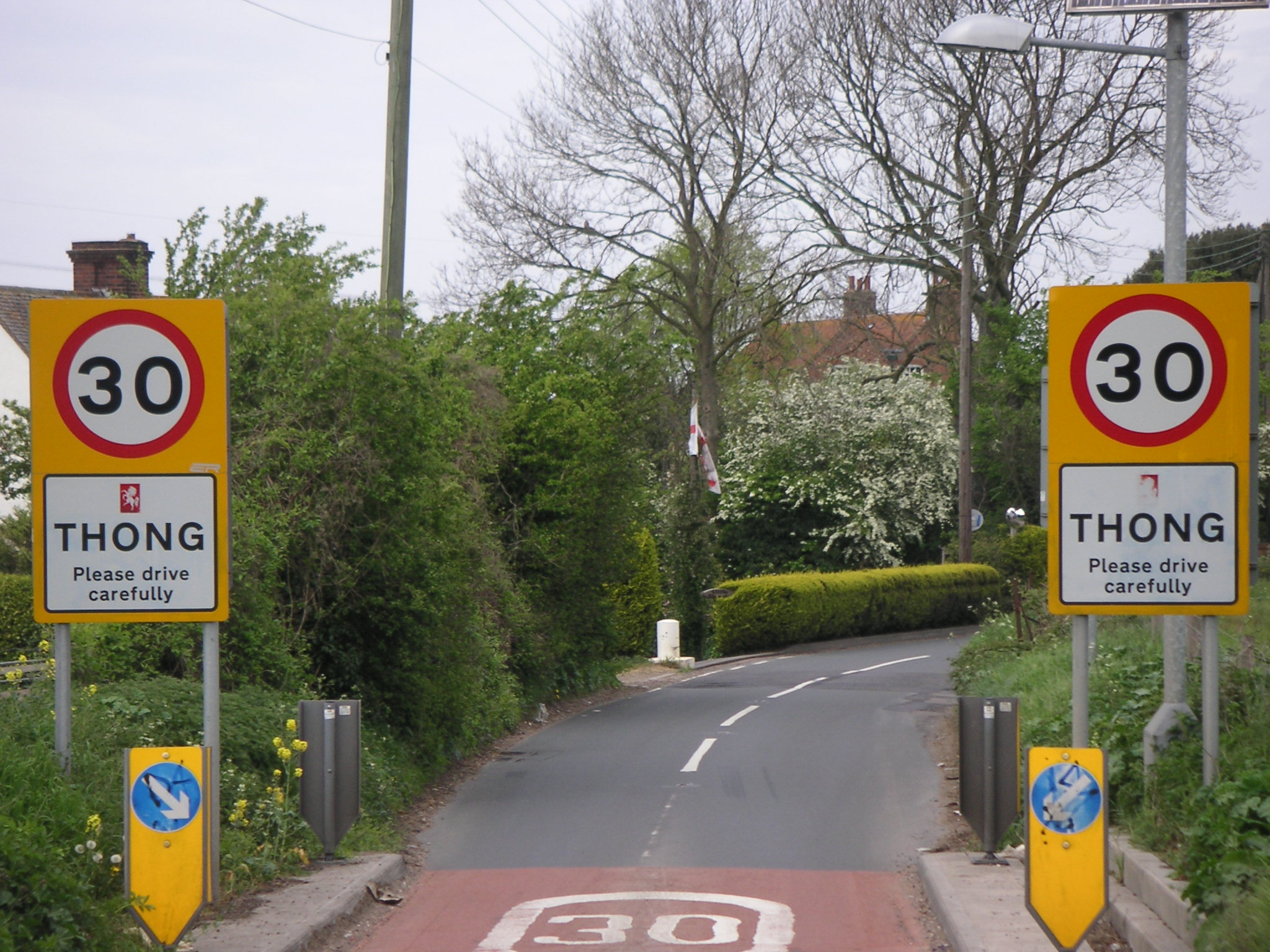
- Thong village boundary signs

- Location within Kent
- OS grid reference: TQ673707
- District: Gravesham
- Shire county: Kent
- Region: South East
- Country: England
- Sovereign state: United Kingdom
- Post town: Gravesend
- Postcode district: DA12
- Police: Kent
- Fire: Kent
- Ambulance: South East Coast
- UK Parliament: Gravesham

Thong is a hamlet southeast of Gravesend in Kent, England. The population of the hamlet is included in the civil parish of Shorne.

It has frequently been noted on lists of unusual place names and appeared as a question answer for Round Britain Quiz on BBC Radio 4.

The name 'Thong' is first attested in the Registrum Roffense of circa 1200, where it appears as Thuange. The name may correspond with the Middle Low German dwenge meaning 'trap', but this cannot be confirmed.
