= Weald Country Park =

Country park in South Weald, Essex, England

Coordinates: 51.62744°N 0.26539°E

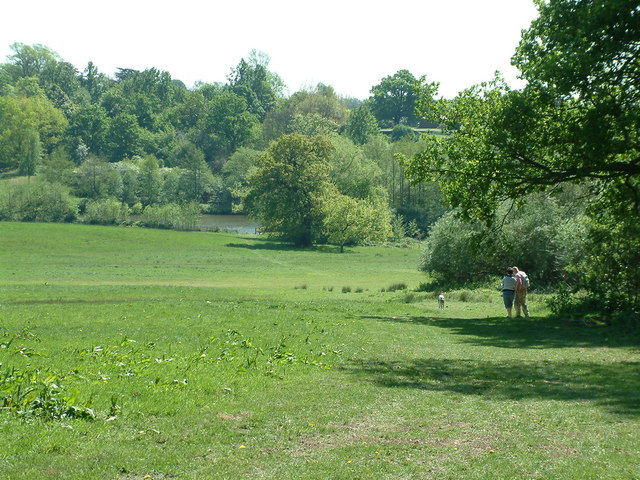
- A meadow in Weald Country Park
- Interactive map of Weald Country Park
- Location: Brentwood, Essex
- Area: 500 acres (200 ha; 0.78 mi^{2}; 2.0 km^{2})
- Operator: Essex County Council

Weald Country Park is a 700-year-old, 500 acre (2 km²) country park in South Weald in the borough of Brentwood in the English county of Essex. It is on the north-east fringe of Greater London.

Weald manor, parts of which dated to the 16th century, was bought by Sir Anthony Browne in 1547 and he died at Weald Hall in 1567. In 1685, Erasmus Smith bought it from Sir William Scroggs. The current layout is largely the result of landscaping carried out in the naturalistic manner of Capability Brown for Hugh Smith, lord of the manor from 1732 to 1745. In 1752, the estate was sold to Thomas Tower of Iver in Buckinghamshire, a lawyer and MP for Wareham in Dorset. Christopher Tower succeeded as the owner in 1778 and immediately commissioned Robert Adam to design a new dining room. On his death in 1810, his son, Christopher Thomas Tower, succeeded until 1867; he enlarged the estate and enclosed some commons as "waste".

The park is now managed by Essex County Council.

== Weald Hall ==
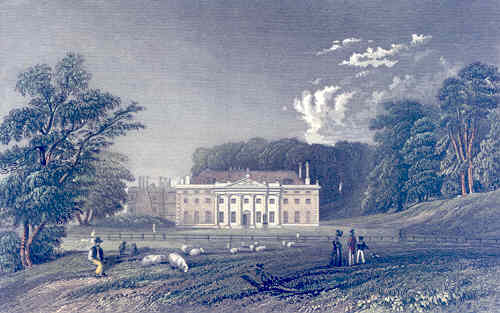
Engraving by William Henry Bartlett of Weald Hall from "The Picturesque Beauties of Great Britain, Essex", 1834

Weald Hall, with 800 acres (3.2 km^{2}) in 1841, was let to farmers in the 19th century sold by another C. T. Tower in 1946, when the estate was broken up though part of the park was retained for the Green Belt of London. Some remnants remain of the Hall, which was demolished in 1950–51 due to war damage, in particular some steps leading to what used to be a folly in the park. The 16th-century lodge miscalled "Queen Mary's Chapel" because it was locally rumoured to have been used by Queen Mary for quiet prayer and contemplation, which used to be enclosed within Weald Hall's walled kitchen garden, still remains at the edge of the park.

A very large (2.8 by 4.8 metres) painting of Weald Hall hung in a dining room at nearby Brentwood School. Depicting the house and park before 18th Century alterations it is attributed to Dutch painter Jan Griffier the Elder (1652-1718). The school, which was founded by a former owner of the Hall, Sir Anthony Browne, sold the painting to a private collector at Sotheby's in November 1985.

== 2012 Olympic Games ==
The park was due to be the venue for the mountain biking events at the 2012 Summer Olympics. However, following a visit by inspectors from the Union Cycliste Internationale, the site was considered insufficiently challenging for international competition and a new venue was sought. Hadleigh Country Park was chosen as the replacement venue.

== Iron Age Hill Fort ==
South Weald Camp was a hillfort based in South Weald, Brentwood, Essex, England. Roughly circular in plan, the fort covered 2.8 hectares (6.9 acres), with a suggested late Iron Age construction date in the period 1st-century BC to 1st-century AD. The location is associated in this period with the Catuvellauni and the Trinovantes.

The camp's defences consisted of a rampart and steep banked slope, with traces of an external ditch. Although for a long time after the Iron Age, the Camp didn't have much use, in the medieval period the fort was used as part of a deer-park and then later used as a WWII training ground. Nowadays, a road (Sandpit Lane) runs roughly north-south through the fort dividing it somewhat unequally with roughly a third to the west (now known as Weald Country Park) and two-thirds to the east (owned by South Weald Cricket Club).
