= Listed buildings in the Borough of Basildon =

There are around 125 listed buildings in the Borough of Basildon, which are buildings of architectural or historic interest.

- Grade I buildings are of exceptional interest.
- Grade II* buildings are particularly important buildings of more than special interest.
- Grade II buildings are of special interest.

The lists follow Historic England’s geographical organisation, with entries grouped by county, local authority, and parish (civil and non-civil). The following lists are arranged by parish.

Parish	List of listed buildings	Grade I	Grade II*	Grade II	Total
Basildon (non-civil parish)	Listed buildings in Basildon	1	3	25	29
Billericay	Listed buildings in Billericay		3	43	46
Bowers Gifford and North Benfleet	Bowers Gifford and North Benfleet#Listed buildings		2	5	7
Great Burstead and South Green	Great Burstead and South Green#Listed buildings	1		14	15
Little Burstead	Listed buildings in Little Burstead		2	9	11
Noak Bridge	Noak Bridge#Listed buildings			2	2
Ramsden Crays	Ramsden Crays#Listed buildings		1	1	2
Shotgate	Shotgate#Listed buildings			2	2
Wickford	Listed buildings in Wickford			9	9

== See also ==
- Grade I listed buildings in Essex
- Grade II* listed buildings in Essex

== Sources ==
- Bettley, James; Pevsner, Nikolaus (2007) [1954], Essex, The Buildings of England, New Haven and London: Yale University Press, ISBN 978-0-300-11614-4
