= Battlesbridge =

Village in Essex, England

Coordinates: 51.622893°N 0.570345°E

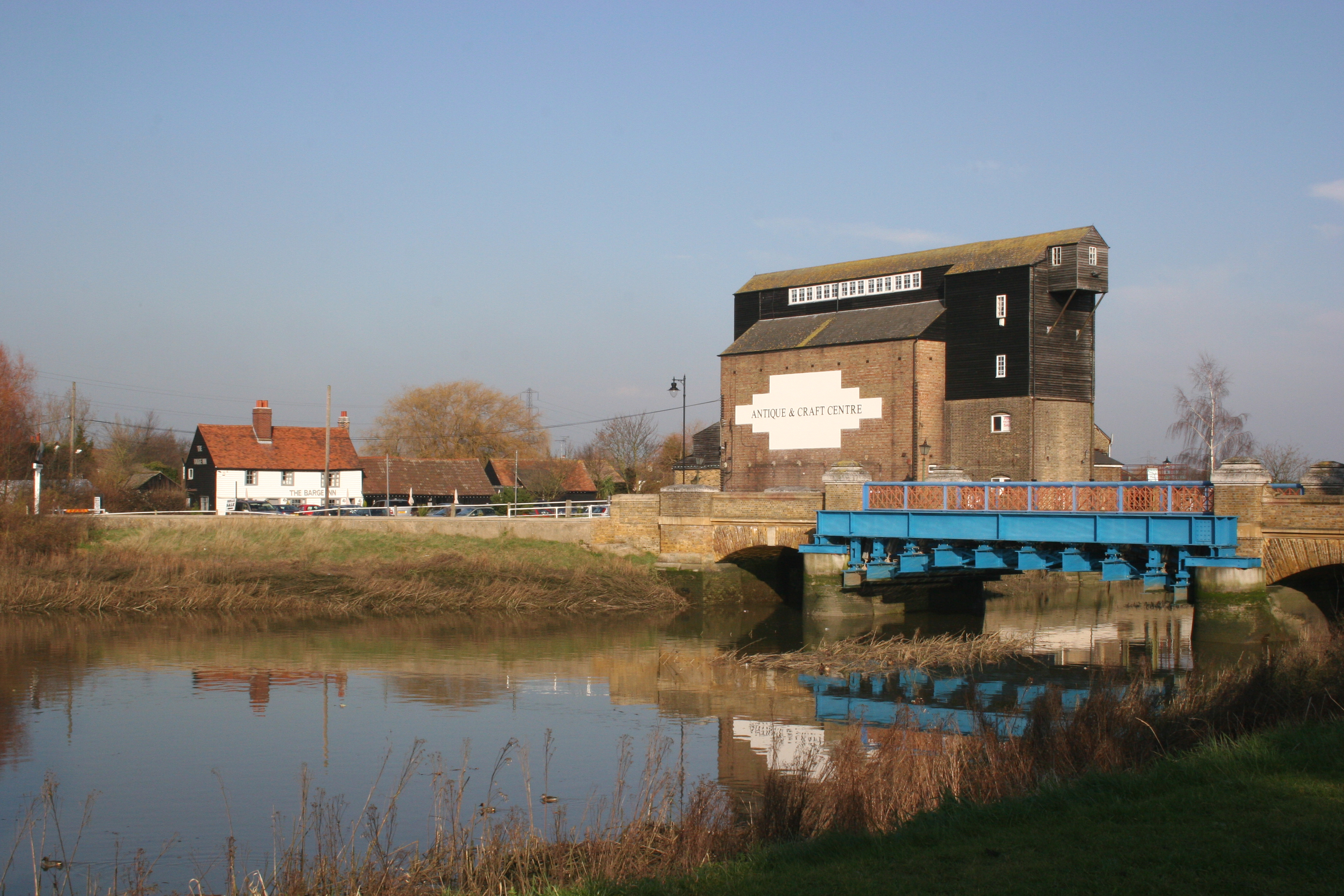
- The bridge and antiques centre

- Location within Essex
- OS grid reference: TQ775945
- Civil parish: Rettendon
- District: Chelmsford
- Shire county: Essex
- Region: East
- Country: England
- Sovereign state: United Kingdom
- Post town: Wickford
- Postcode district: SS11
- Dialling code: 01268
- Police: Essex
- Fire: Essex
- Ambulance: East of England
- UK Parliament: Rayleigh and Wickford

Battlesbridge is a village in Essex, England. It straddles the River Crouch which is tidal and navigable up to this point. It is approximately 14 miles (23 km) south-southeast of Chelmsford and 4 miles (6.4 km) north of Rayleigh. The north bank of the river is in the civil parish of Rettendon, while the south bank is in Rawreth. It is a suburb of the town of Wickford and falls under the postal codes used in Wickford.

Today it is home to a number of antiques centres, one of which is in a former mill.

Battlesbridge is a conservation area which was jointly designated by Chelmsford Borough Council (north side of the river) and Rochford District Council (south side of the river) in February 1992 and March 1992 respectively.

The village is served by Battlesbridge railway station on the Crouch Valley Line.

Classic Car and Motorbike shows are held here each year.

For some years, the Battlesbridge Rural Theatre staged outdoor shows with proceeds going to local charities.

== History ==
There are several suggestions as to how Battlesbridge got its name, but none are definitive. Philip Benton, writing in the 1860s, suggested that it could have been linked to the Battle of Assandune, fought in 1016 between the Saxons and the Danes, or possibly some other battle. There is a reference to Batailesbregge in 1351, in connection with the family of Reginald Battaille, and this seems to be the most likely explanation, although Newton suggests that it cannot be completely ruled out that it derives from Botuluesbrige, linking it to St Botolph, the seventh-century patron saint of wayfarers.

There has been a bridge at Battlesbridge since at least 1372, and possibly a little earlier, since the Batailesbregge mentioned in 1351 suggests the presence of a bridge there. In 1571, the bridge was described as 'ruinous and in great decay' at the Quarter Sessions. A new timber bridge was constructed in 1769 and the roadway was managed by a Turnpike Trust between 1794 and 1820. Another new bridge was erected in 1845, but collapsed when a steam traction engine attempted to cross it. A replacement bridge was erected around 1872, at a cost of £3,500, to the designs of Henry Stock. This carried all traffic for over 100 years, until it was widened on the upstream side to accommodate two lanes of traffic. The road that it carries was once the A130 road, but was declassified when the Battlesbridge Bypass was built a little further to the west. The road over the bypass bridge has since been reclassified as the A1245, when it was superseded by the Mayrose Bridge, 1,066 feet (325 m) further upstream, which was built as part of a project to construct a replacement A130 road between Chelmsford and the A127 Southend Arterial Road. The bridge has a span of 119 feet (36.4 m) with two intermediate piers, and provides 10 feet (3 m) of headroom above normal high tide levels in the river.

Battlesbridge was a small port by the late medieval period, and continued to expand subsequently. By 1777, there were a number of farmstead scattered along the north bank of the river, while the area to the south was unenclosed marshland. A tide mill was built around 1771, although it is not known whether there was an earlier mill at the site. Marshes to the south of the river were protected from flooding around 1812, so that they could be used for grazing sheep, and the river had been embanked by 1876. The 1838 tithe maps show that cottages and shops had been built on the north bank, with many of the cottages having gardens. There were also kilns, a second mill on the south bank, and more cottages to the east. By the late 19th century, there were mills, farms, coal yards, lime kilns and maltings. Wharves on both sides of the river enabled boats to be loaded with flour and hay for animal bedding, with incoming cargoes of coal. Malt, lime and chalk were also traded, while the river provided good catches of fish.

Communication was improved by the opening of the Crouch Valley line by the Great Eastern Railway, with Battlesbridge railway station opening for passengers on 1 July 1889. Trains ran to Wickford to the west, where the line joined the Shenfield–Southend line, and to Burnham-on-Crouch and Southminster to the east. The line was electrified in 1986.

A significant feature of the village is the dam across the river which was part of a tide mill. In 1765, local people from the parish of Rettendon petitioned the Lord of the Manor, Thomas Fitch of Danbury, for permission to build a mill on the north bank of the river. When it was built, the mill was situated on the south bank, and was therefore in the parish of Rawreth, where St John’s College, Cambridge acted as Lord of the Manor. The college issued a licence to Edward Building of Moulsham on 3 March 1766 to allow its construction, but because it was necessary to place stakes, piles and boards on the north bank of the river as part of the dam, some negotiation was required with Thomas Finch, and the miller had to pay Finch £5 four times a year. The land on which the building stood was purchased from the college, while the mill building was complete by February 1767, or possibly earlier. It had four storeys and was powered by two water wheels, driving four pairs of French stones. The complex also included a house for the miller and an outhouse.

John Deely the miller became bankrupt in 1837, and the mill was sold. The sale documents described it as a tide mill with a house, a stabling coach house and a granary together with an extensive coal wharf and brick yard with dry kilns. Water from the incoming tide flowed through a set of pointed gates, which closed as the tide began to fall. The impounded water drove a breastshot wheel which was 18 feet (5.5 m) in diameter and 10 feet (3.0 m) wide. Lighters could enter the mill leat through a set of gates at every tide. There was a granary below the bridge, which could be accessed more easily, without the need for boats to lower their masts. Under the ownership of William Meeson, the business prospered, and he built a new mill house in 1857. Around 1896, a steam mill was built on the north bank of the river just below the bridge, and a second mill on the south bank was constructed soon afterwards. A leat was partially constructed from the old mill to the new, but power was provided by oil engines. Despite this, records stated that water and steam power were in use in 1886 and 1926. Much of the tide mill complex was demolished in 1902–03, but some remains, as does the drying kiln and granary. The grade II listed building that remains is built of bricks and dates from the late 18th century. It has a red tiled roof with a weatherboarded lucam and gable, and contains three storeys and a loft. It is used as a warehouse with attached offices. The dam is built of red bricks with stone copings. The granary and drying kiln is located slightly further upstream, and was built of red brick in the early 19th century. The single-storey west range has a red pantiled roof, the two storey central range has a grey slate roof, and the kiln is at the east end, with its tall pyramidal roof and timber wind cowl. This building has been converted into a house, and is also grade II listed.

The owner of the mill restored the tide gates in 1989 and used a new water wheel to drive an electrical generator. The tidal gates were replaced again in 2008. The new gates, weighing 19 tonnes, were constructed using pine beams and metal sluices. The design and working drawings for the project were prepared by Roy Hart, the owner of the site, and the work was carried out by Hart and his son Justin. Keeble Brothers of Woodham Ferrers assisted with some of the more specialised milling of the timber.

== Facilities ==
For a number of years, the Battlesbridge Rural Theatre put on shows, with proceeds going to local charities. The first production was in 2001, when Roy Hart, owner of the tide mill, asked Simon Richards, an actor and director based in Thorpe Bay, to stage an outdoor production. He selected the cast, organised the production, and usually played a role himself. Shows that have been staged include A Midsummer Night's Dream, Lark Rise to Candleford, The Wind in the Willows, Treasure Island and The Importance of Being Earnest. Richards departed in 2007, to tour the world, but the eccentric productions continued for some years, with the last advertised production being Opera & Proms by the Lake in June 2012.

From the 1960s onwards, Battlesbridge became a centre for antiques and collectibles. Around a dozen buildings on the north bank of the river are used for this purpose, with the largest being the former mill. The village has two pubs. The Barge Inn is near to the bridge, and occupies a grade II listed timber-framed and weatherboarded building dating from the 17th and 18th centuries. The Hawk is a large country pub, located on Hawk Hill opposite the entrance to the railway station. There is a place of worship on Hawk Hill, within the conservation area, known as Battlesbridge Free Church. It was formed around 1846, and is a member of the Congregational Federation. The adjacent church hall provides a meeting space within the village, but it is a temporary building of poor quality. There is a small motorcycle museum, housing a collection of vintage and classic motorbikes, as well as assorted memorabilia. It acts as a meeting place for motorcyclists.

== Images ==
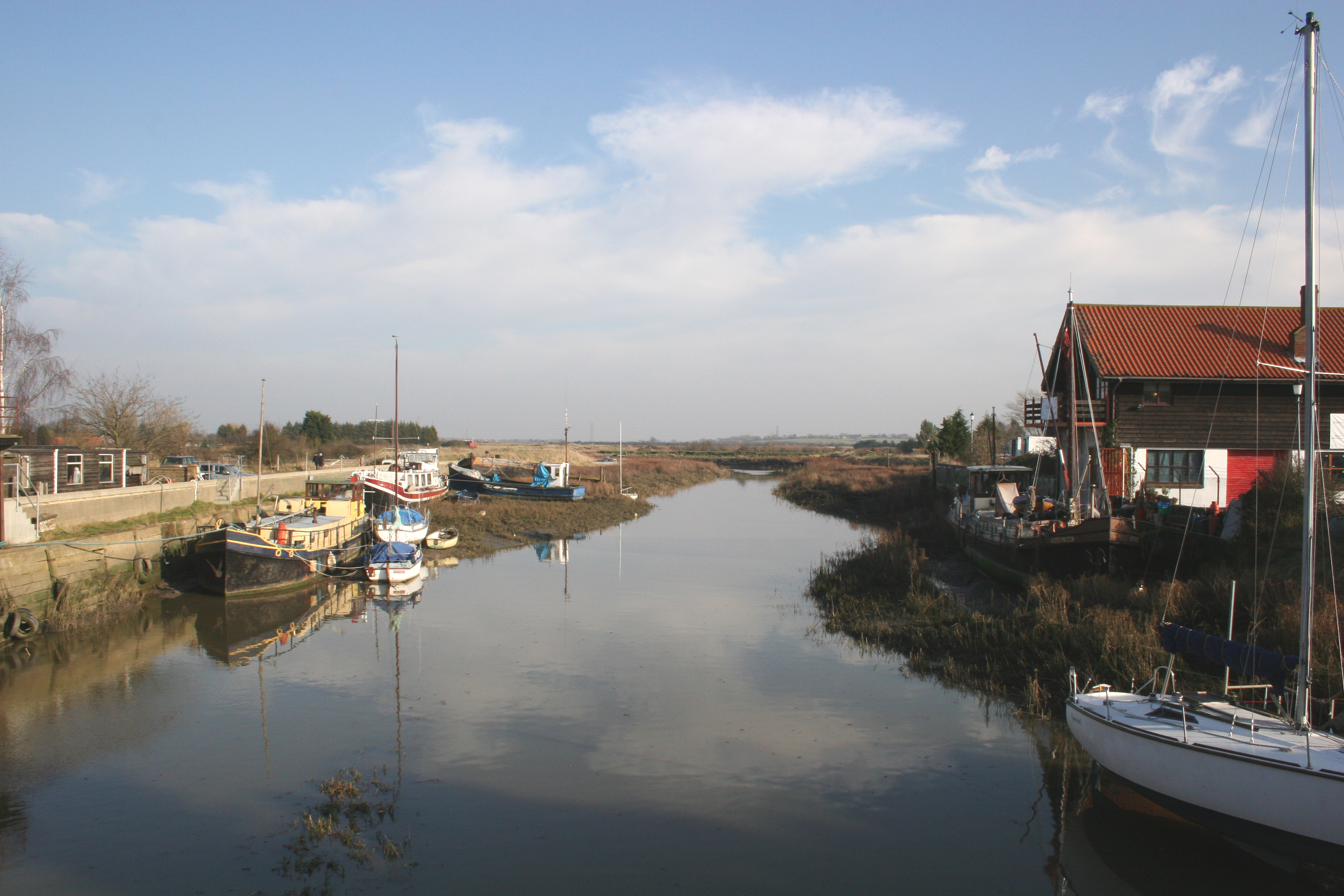
The Crouch

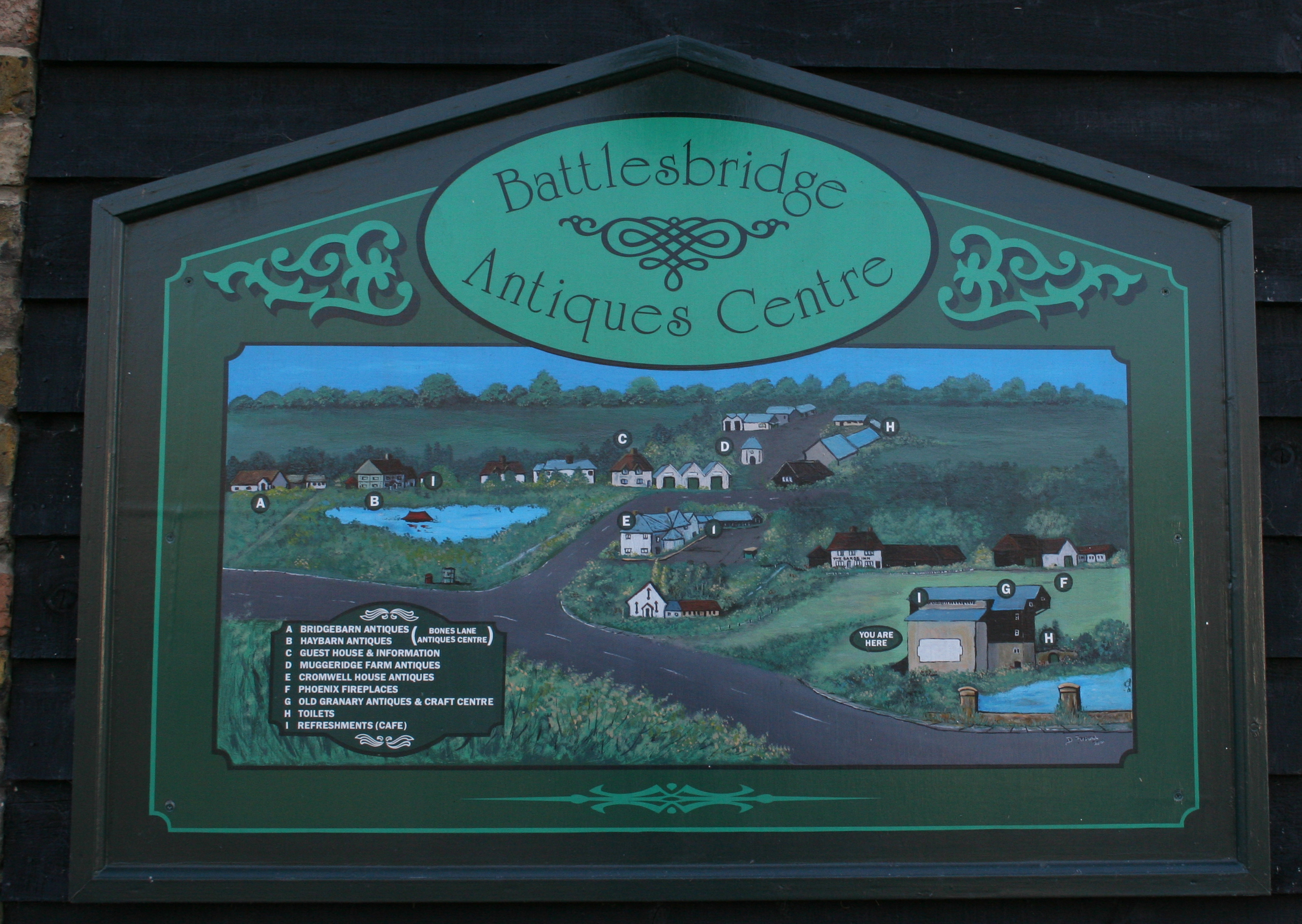
Local information sign

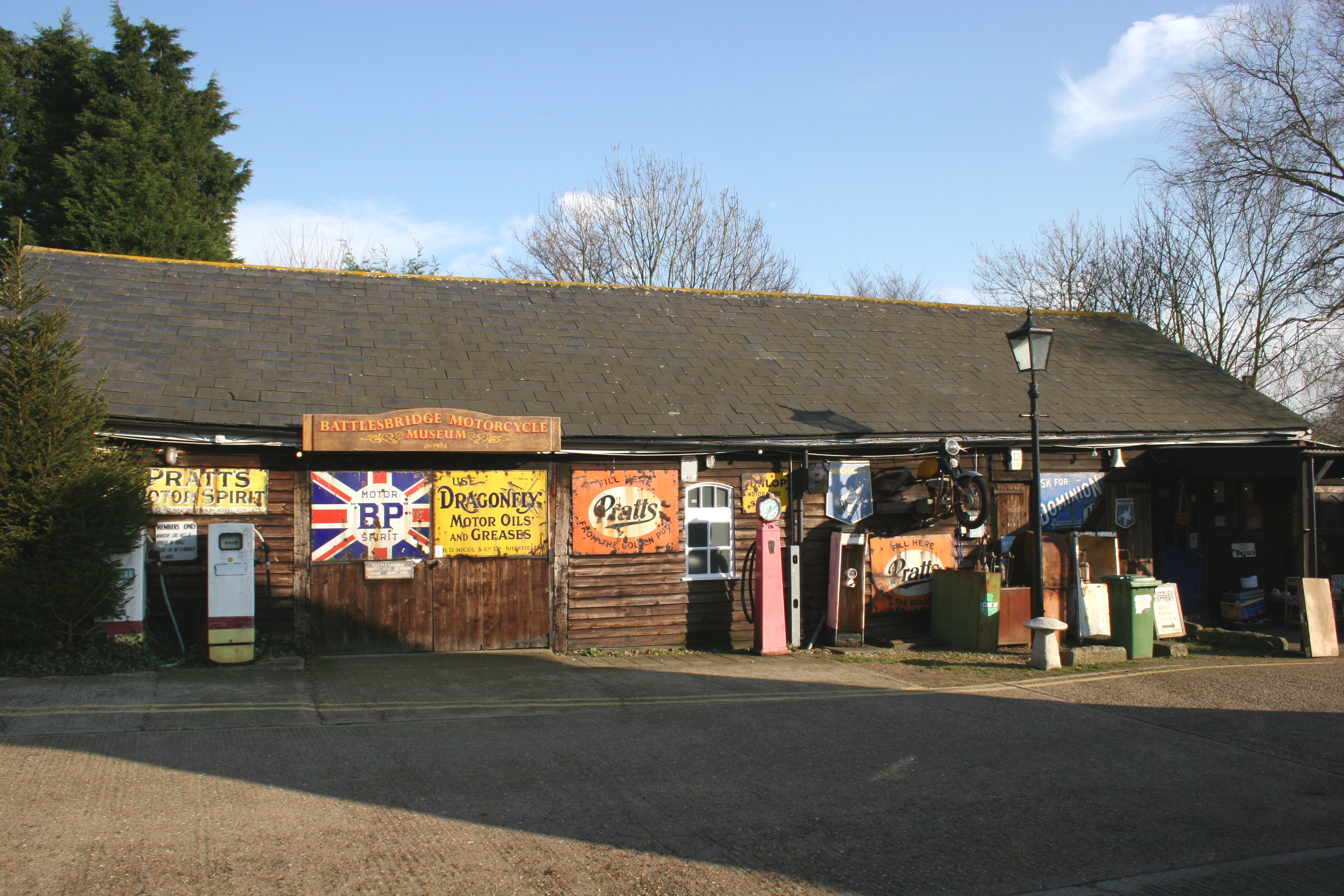
Motorcycle Museum

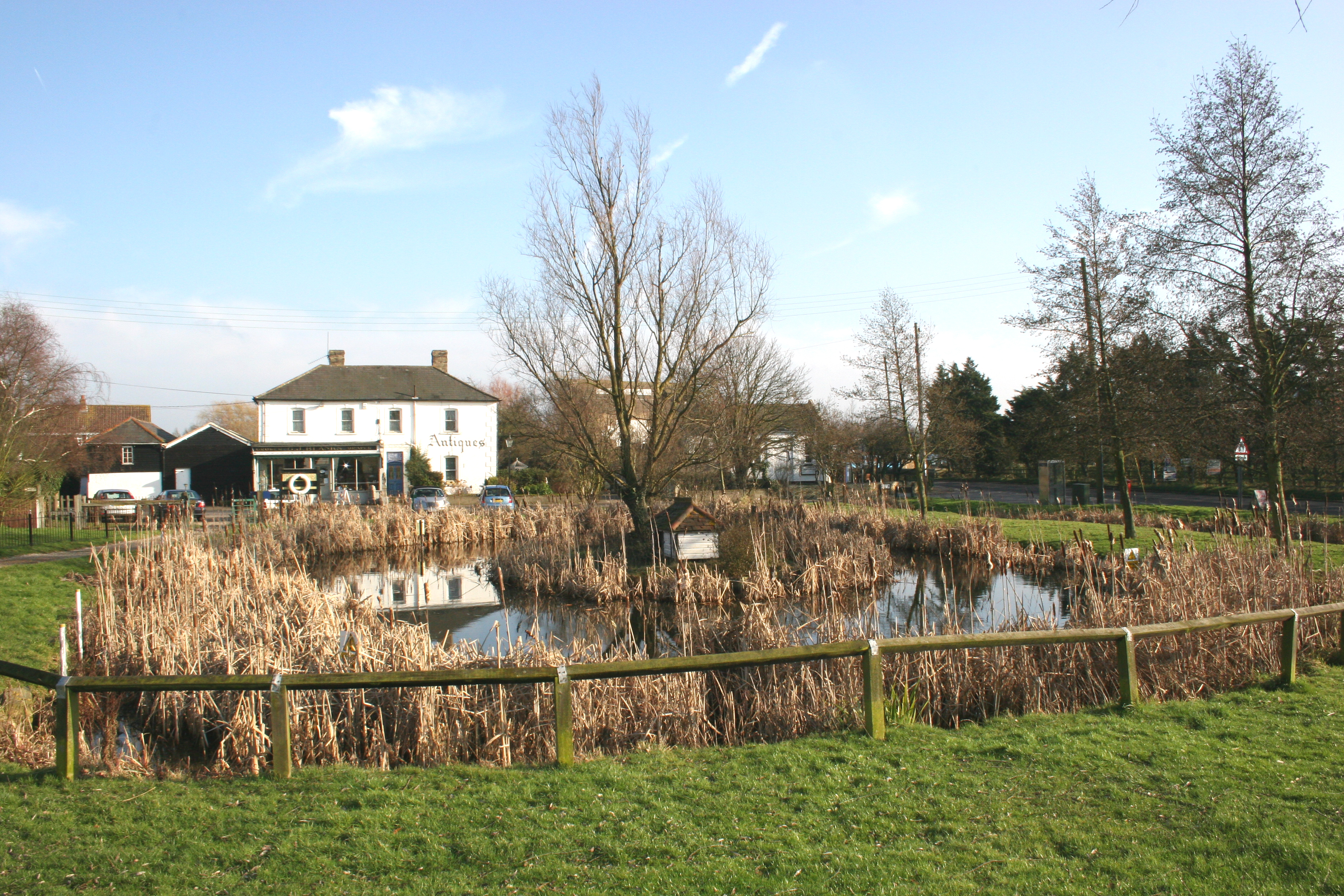
The Village Pond

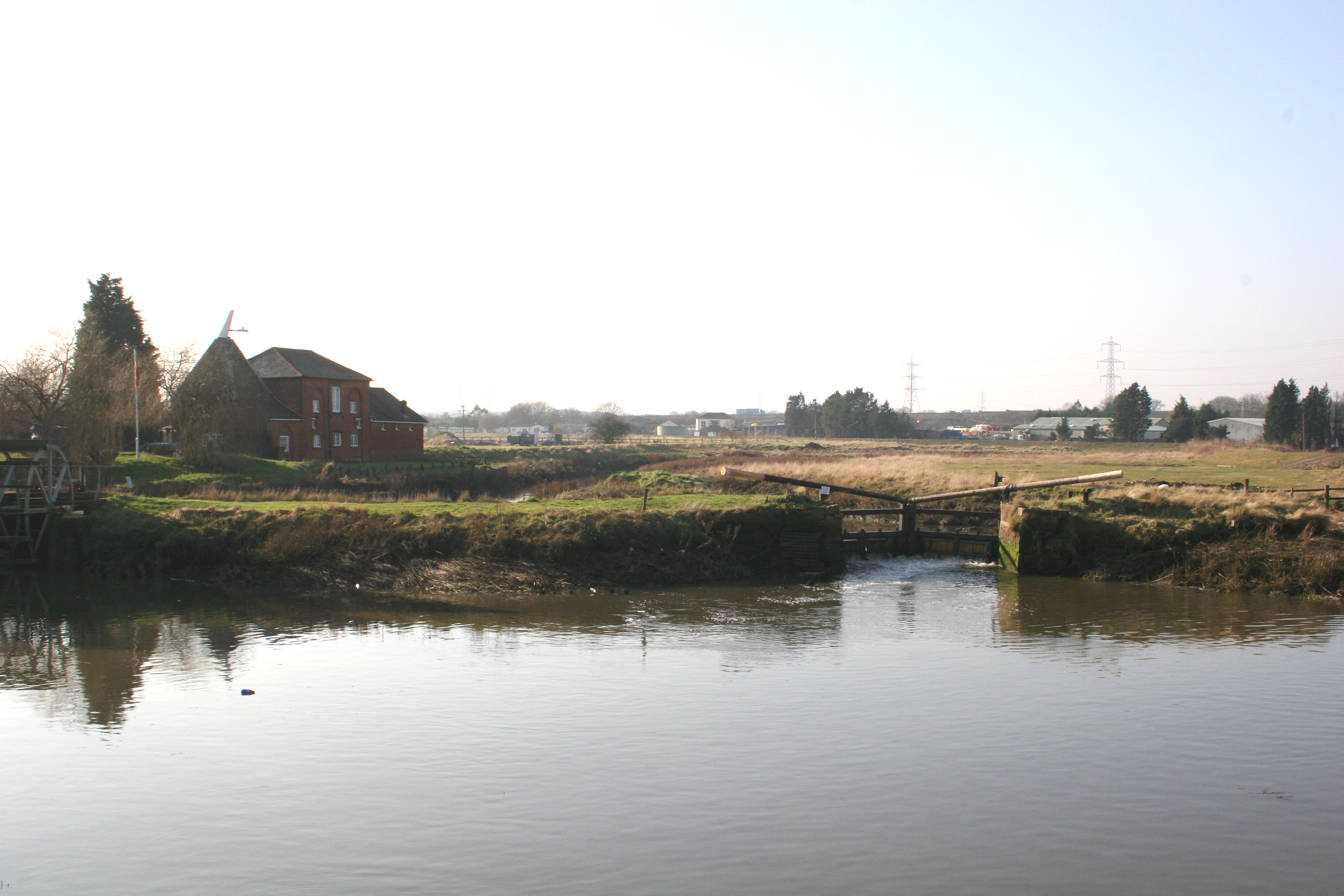
The Tidal Gates

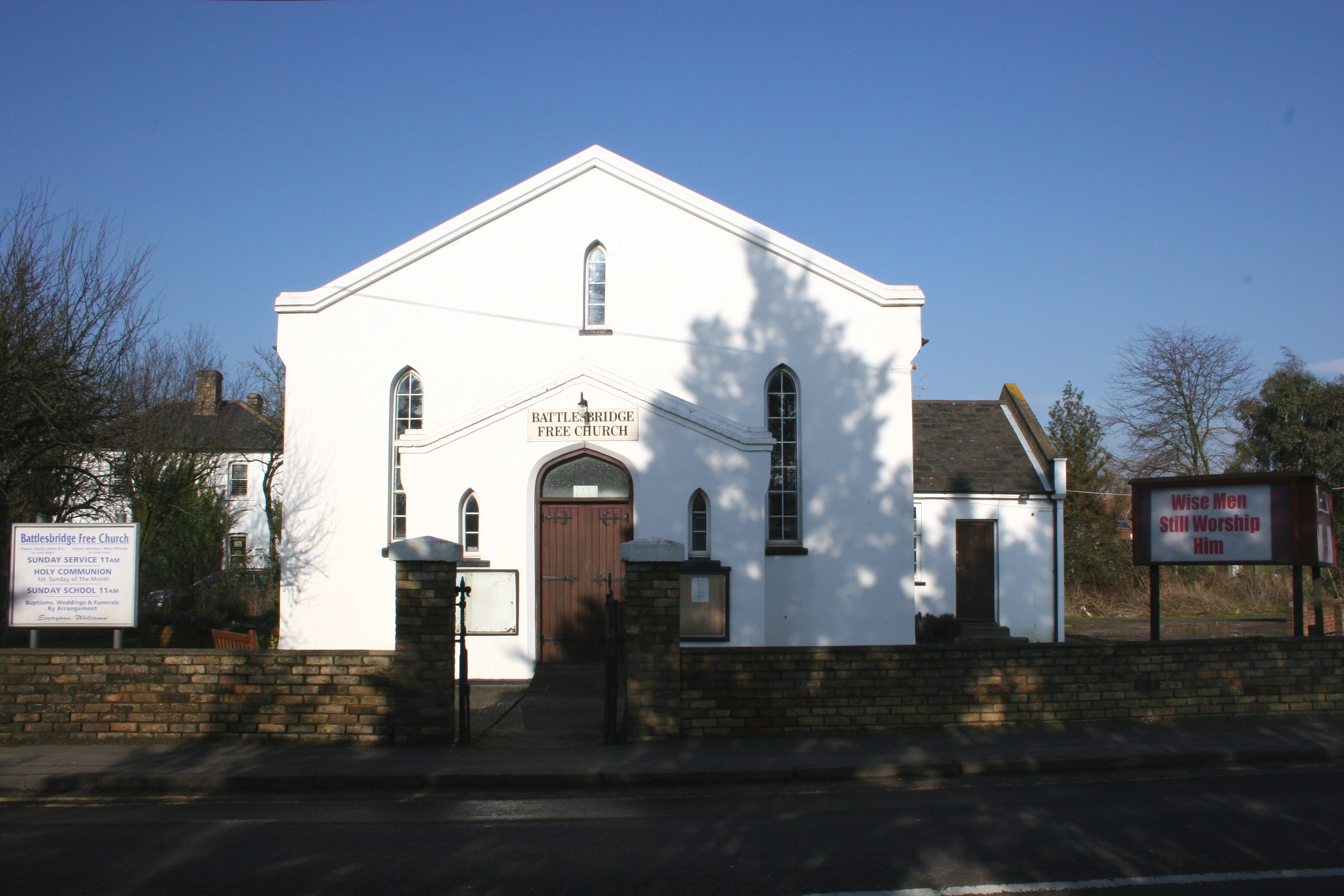
Battlesbridge Free Church

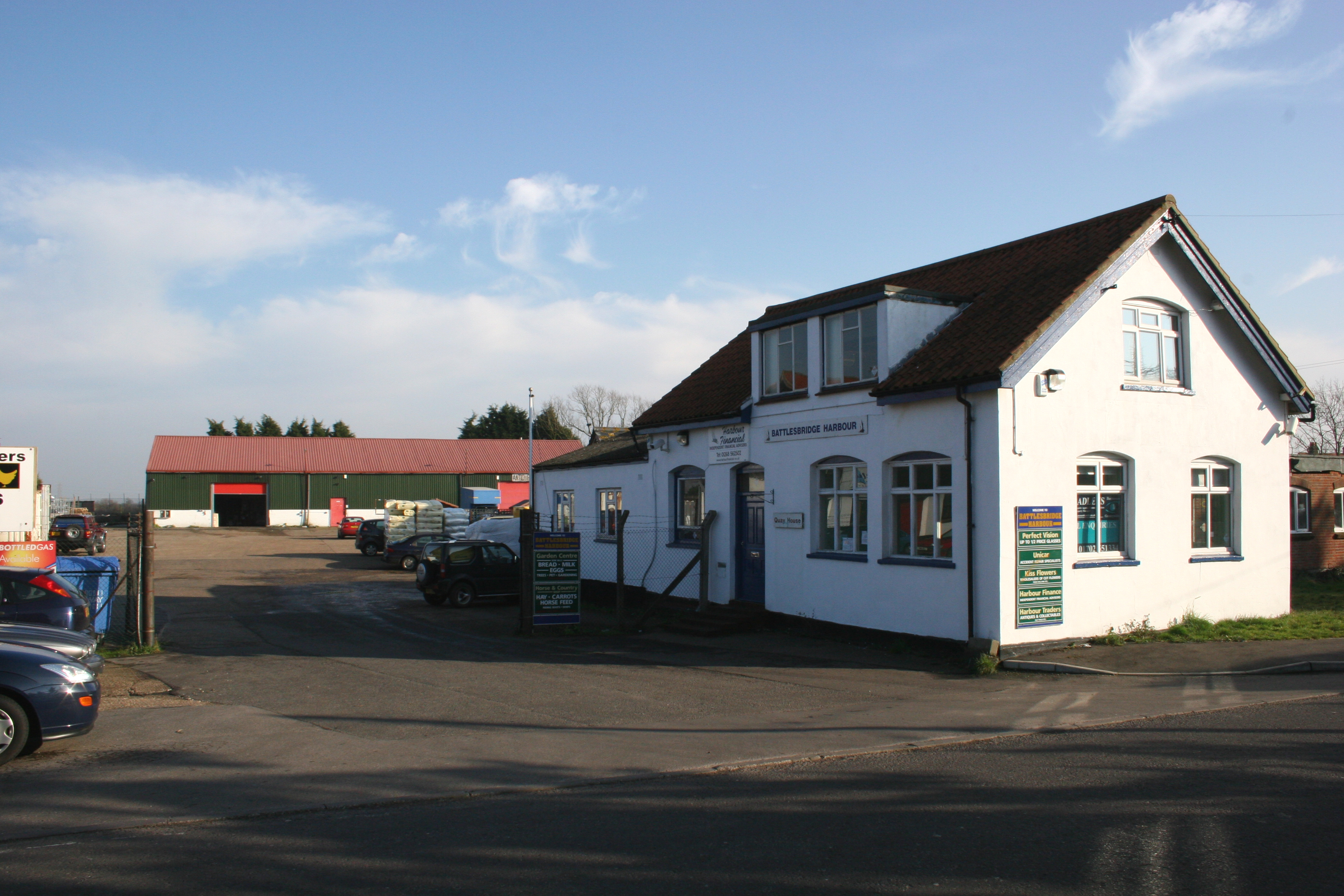
Battlesbridge Harbour

=== Public Houses ===
The Barge Inn	The Hawk
