= Katharine Montagu =

British neuroscientist

- Born: 21 February 1925
- Died: 21 June 2023 (aged 98)
- Known for: Dopamine
- Scientific career
- Workplaces: Runwell Hospital

Katharine Anne Montagu (21 February 1925 - 21 June 2023) was the first researcher to identify dopamine in human brains. Working in Hans Weil-Malherbe's laboratory at the Runwell Hospital outside London the presence of dopamine was identified by paper chromatography in the brain of several species, including a human brain. Her research was published in August 1957, followed and confirmed by Hans Weil-Malherbe in November 1957.

Nobel Prize-rewarded Arvid Carlsson is often claimed to be the first researcher to identify dopamine in human brain, however his research was published in November 1957, along with colleagues Margit Linsqvist and Tor Magnusson.

== Early life ==
Katharine Anne Montagu was born at Territet in Switzerland, the only daughter of Captain Henry Bernard Montagu RN Retd and his American wife Rosamond née Fay. She was sent to America in 1940 to stay with her American relatives in Boston, leaving Glasgow on the SS Cameronia on 26 July 1940.

== Research employment ==
Montagu was first employed as a laboratory assistant at the Wellcome Physiological Research Laboratories. During this time, she gained a BSc in General Science as an external student of the University of London in 1950. She continued her studies as an internal student at King’s College and was awarded an MSc in physiology in July 1952. Remaining a member of the department, she studied the depressant effect of adrenaline on the rat diaphragm, and subsequently the effect of adrenaline in skeletal nerve muscles.

Montagu moved to Runwell Hospital in 1954 where she joined the Research Department under Dr Hans Weil-Malherbe. Her initial research focused on adrenaline and noradrenaline in rat tissues, publishing a number of related papers. It preceded her work on catechol compounds in rat tissues and in the brains of other species.

Montagu joined the Department of Zoology at King's College, London in 1957 where she researched the effects of anti-tumour drugs on eggs of Xenopus laevis. She next moved to the Obstetrics Research Unit at University College Hospital Medical School, London to study a method of estimating urinary excretion of oestrogens for therapeutic use in pregnancy. Subsequent work researched pepsin in gastric juices and peptic ulceration as well as biochemical research and clinical estimations involving cortisol. She was awarded an MSc in biology by Chelsea College of Science and Technology in 1971. Her research continued for a further nine years, mostly in radiation health at London University.
