= Runwell Hospital =

- South Essex Partnership University NHS Foundation Trust
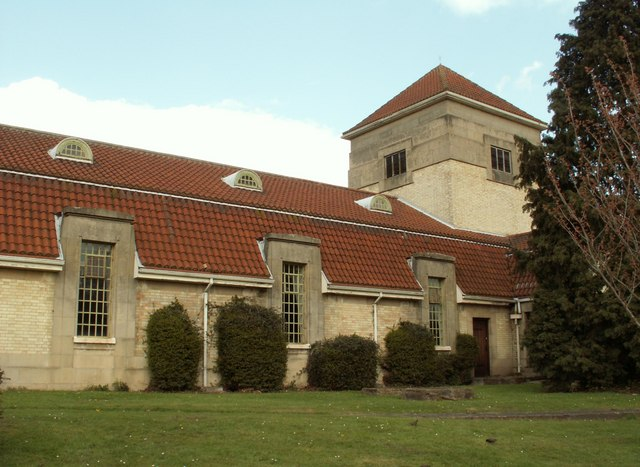
- St. Luke's church at Runwell Hospital

- Shown in Essex

Geography
- Location: Wickford, Essex, England
- Coordinates: 51.6352°N 0.5418°E

Organisation
- Care system: NHS
- Type: Specialist
- Affiliated university: Anglia Ruskin University

Services
- Emergency department: No
- Speciality: Psychiatric

History
- Founded: 1937
- Closed: 2010

Links
- Website: www.sept.nhs.uk
- Lists: Hospitals in England

Runwell Hospital was a hospital in the Chelmsford district of Essex. It was managed by the South Essex Partnership University NHS Foundation Trust.

== History ==
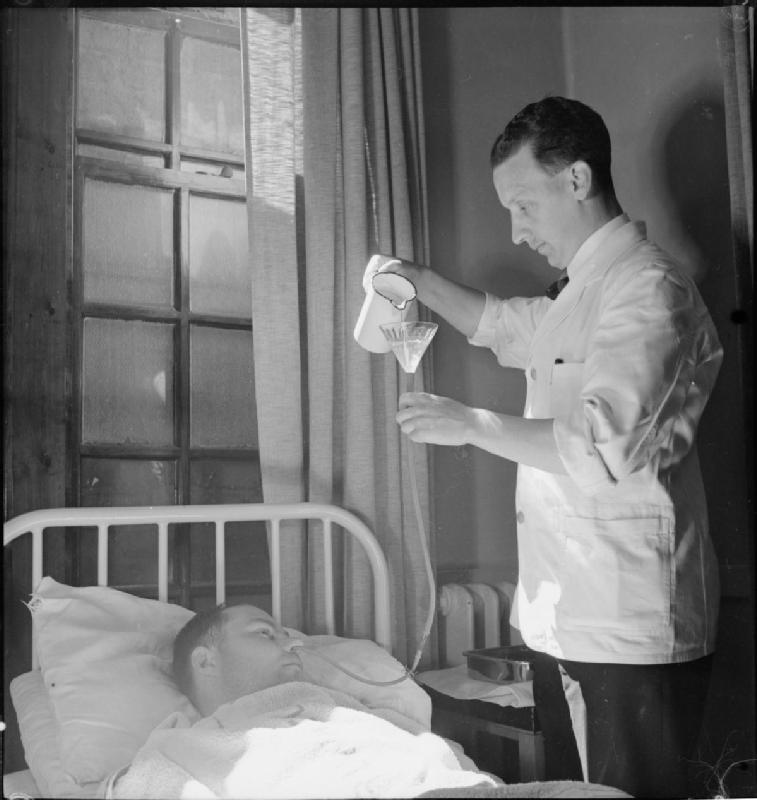
Nasogastric intubation is performed at Runwell Hospital in 1943

Following the ending of contracts accommodating patients at the Essex County Council's Brentwood Mental Hospital, joint facilities were developed between East Ham and Southend-on-Sea boroughs. A site was chosen in Runwell at Runwell Hall Farm, to the north of the town of Wickford and the firm of Elcock and Sutcliffe were chosen as architects to the site, the former having previously designed the new Bethlem Royal Hospital at Monks Orchard.

The foundation stone was laid by Laurence Brock in June 1934 and the hospital was officially opened by Sir Kingsley Wood, Minister of Health, as Runwell Mental Hospital in June 1937. The chapel, dedicated to St. Luke, was placed in a prominent position.

The hospital was bombed by the German Luftwaffe during the Second World War; there was extensive damage including a number of large craters but no injuries to staff.

The hospital joined the National Health Service in 1948 and Professor John Corsellis led the development of a "brain bank", using samples taken from patients not just from the hospital but from elsewhere in the United Kingdom. It became Runwell Hospital in 1955. Following the introduction of Care in the Community in the early 1980s, the hospital went into a period of decline and eventually closed in August 2010.

Proposals to develop the site initially included provision for a large prison but this proposal was withdrawn following strong local opposition. The site has since been developed for residential use by Countryside Properties and the area is now known as St Luke's Park.
