= SS postcode area =

Postcode area within the United Kingdom

Southend-on-Sea
- Postcode area
- Coordinates: 51.563°N 0.598°E
- Country: United Kingdom
- Postcode area: SS
- Postcode area name: Southend-on-Sea
- Post towns: 11
- Postcode districts: 19
- Postcode sectors: 81
- Postcodes (live): 11,891
- Postcodes (total): 17,265
- Statistics as at May 2020

The SS postcode area, also known as the Southend-on-Sea postcode area, is a group of seventeen postcode districts in England, within eleven post towns. These cover south-east Essex, including Southend-on-Sea, Basildon, Benfleet, Canvey Island, Hockley, Leigh-on-Sea, Rayleigh, Rochford, Stanford-le-Hope, Westcliff-on-Sea and Wickford.

== Coverage ==
The approximate coverage of the postcode districts:

Postcode district	Post town	Coverage	Local authority area(s)
SS0	WESTCLIFF-ON-SEA	Westcliff-on-Sea, Chalkwell	Southend-on-Sea
SS1	WESTCLIFF-ON-SEA	PO Boxes	non-geographic
SS1	SOUTHEND-ON-SEA	Southend-on-Sea, Thorpe Bay	Southend-on-Sea
SS2	SOUTHEND-ON-SEA	Southend-on-Sea, Prittlewell, Southchurch, Southend Airport	Southend-on-Sea, Rochford
SS3	SOUTHEND-ON-SEA	Shoeburyness, Great Wakering, Little Wakering, Barling, Foulness Island	Rochford, Southend-on-Sea
SS4	ROCHFORD	Rochford, Ashingdon, Canewdon, Stambridge, Paglesham	Rochford
SS5	HOCKLEY	Hockley, Hullbridge, Hawkwell	Rochford
SS6	RAYLEIGH	Rayleigh	Rochford, Castle Point
SS7	BENFLEET	Hadleigh, South Benfleet, Thundersley	Castle Point, Basildon
SS8	CANVEY ISLAND	Canvey Island	Castle Point
SS9	LEIGH-ON-SEA	Leigh-on-Sea, Eastwood	Southend-on-Sea, Rochford
SS11	WICKFORD	Wickford (north and east), Shotgate, Runwell, Battlesbridge, Rawreth	Basildon, Chelmsford, Rochford
SS12	WICKFORD	Wickford (south and west), North Benfleet	Basildon
SS13	BASILDON	Pitsea	Basildon
SS14	BASILDON	Basildon	Basildon
SS15	BASILDON	Laindon	Basildon
SS16	BASILDON	Langdon Hills, Vange	Basildon, Thurrock
SS17	STANFORD-LE-HOPE	Stanford-le-Hope, Corringham, Horndon-on-the-Hill, Fobbing	Thurrock, Basildon
SS22	SOUTHEND-ON-SEA	International Masters Publishers	non-geographic
SS99	SOUTHEND-ON-SEA	HM Revenue and Customs (VAT), First Data	non-geographic

== Map ==
SS postcode area map, showing postcode districts in red and post towns in grey text, with links to nearby CM, ME and RM postcode areas.

== See also ==
- Postcode Address File
- List of postcode areas in the United Kingdom
