= Runwell =

Village in Essex, England

Coordinates: 51.624°N 0.540°E

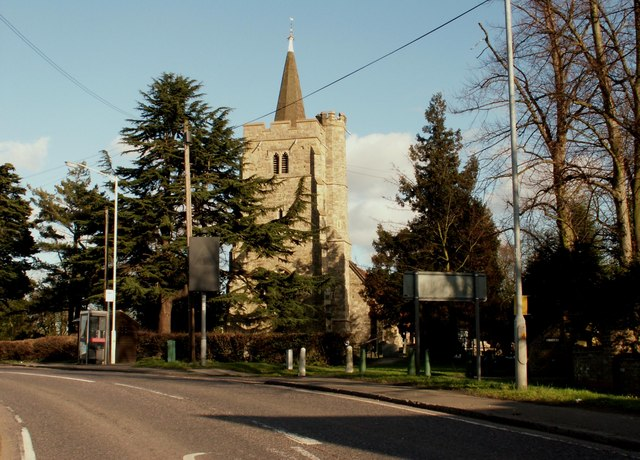
- St Mary's church in Runwell

- Location within Essex
- Population: 4,540 (Parish, 2021)
- Civil parish: Runwell
- Shire county: Essex
- Region: East
- Country: England
- Sovereign state: United Kingdom
- Post town: Wickford
- Postcode district: SS11
- Dialling code: 01268
- Police: Essex
- Fire: Essex
- Ambulance: East of England

Runwell is a village and civil parish in the Chelmsford district of Essex, England. The village immediately adjoins the northern edge of the town of Wickford. The parish also includes rural areas, particularly to the north and east of the village, and includes the St Luke's Park development at the former Runwell Hospital site. At the 2021 census the parish had a population of 4,450.

== Amenities ==
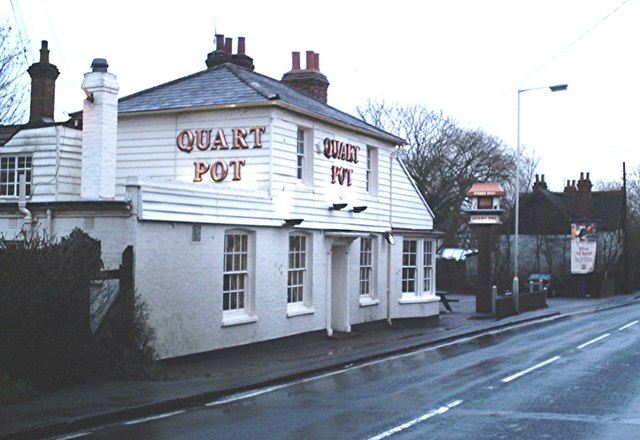
The Quart pot pub, Runwell

Runwell Community Primary School and St Mary's Church are located in Runwell. Runwell Hospital was closed in 2010 and partially demolished in 2012. The site is being transformed into a housing estate to be called St Luke's Park (the hospital chapel had been dedicated to St Luke), consisting of around 580 new homes as well as non-residential space. The village also has a Pre-school and two pubs; the Quart pot and Toby Carvery Runwell. The closest train station to Runwell is Wickford railway station and the number 15 bus runs from Runwell to Basildon.

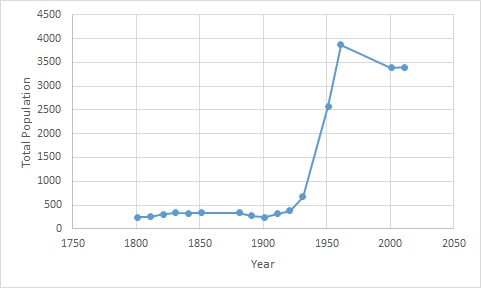
Runwell population from census data 1801-2011

== History ==
Runwell has had inhabitants dating back to the 1200s when the church (st Mary's) was built and the village was included in the 1801 census that reported that it had 243 people living in it. The parish grew steadily in every census after that. The village has always been a majority agricultural intensive area in terms of its employment of its inhabitants with a huge amount of the population working in agriculture in the 1831 census.

In 1870-72 the imperial Gazetteer described Runwell like this:

RUNWELL, a parish in Chelmsford district, Essex; on the river Crouch, 5 miles N by E of Pitsea r.station. Post-town, Chelmsford. Acres, 2,059. Real property, £2, 641. Pop., 366. Houses, 70. The manor, with R. Hall, belongs to T. Kemble, Esq. The living is a rectory in the diocese of Rochester. Value, £570.* Patron, the Rev. T. Knox. The church is later English and was recently restored. There is a day school. According to the 2011 Census the total population was 3,394 with 1,658 males and 1,736 females living in the parish.

=== 1824 robbery ===
In 1824 Runwell was subject to a robbery headed by a man with the name of John Turner who knew of a farmer in Runwell by the name of Samuel Robinson who kept large amounts of cash on the premises. "After the heist over £15 in cash was stolen which they divided among them, and nine bottles of gin and brandy which they quickly began to consume". It is not clear how Turner was arrested, but on 21 December 1827, he was executed at Springfield Prison.

=== World War II ===
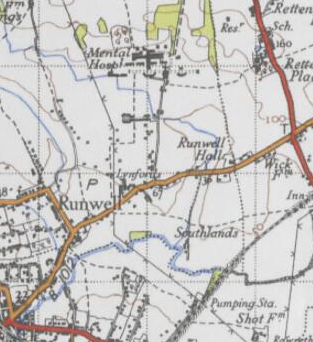
Map of Runwell from 1945

During the war Runwell was used as an evacuation point for children from major cities for their protection. The area, like all of Britain, was heavily bombed due to the air raids. one account of growing up in Runwell was from a 12-year-old boy who described the time as such "As we had no air raid shelter, our beds were raised up on bricks, with another mattress on the floor. When the raids got bad, we went under our beds, hoping the upper mattress etc. would protect us from any debris" showing the extent to which Runwell was bombed during this period. When the war ended, like everywhere else in the UK, Runwell celebrated. One account of the festivities was as such "There was great rejoicing when the War eventually ended, with bonfires, fireworks and street parties. I don’t know where the fireworks came from because once the war had started there was no more Guy Fawkes Bonfire Night, and as for the street parties, I think the mums had been saving food for just that event."

In the 1940s Runwell was without a lot of local amenities such as a school and doctors surgery, therefore residents had to travel to neighbouring Wickford for such services. In fact most of the essential amenities were located there and still are, however, there was a library within the parish.

=== Fetes and fayres ===
Throughout the 1970s and 1980s Runwell held annual village fetes during summer time. They were largely successful with residents from neighbouring Wickford also joining in the festivities. They were held in the Runwell hall gardens, but due to the popularity of these events, they moved location to the larger St. Mary's Vicarage Gardens in Church End Lane. They usually had a theme such as "Ye Olde Runwell Fayre" (1976) and the "Cockney Fete" (1981). Profits from the Fayres were donated to local charities e.g. Runwell Hospital (which has now since closed), Runwell School and St. Mary's Church, Runwell.

== Sport in Runwell ==
Runwell's local football team is Runwell sports FC, formally known as Runwell Hospital, and was established in 1946 by two former staff members of the hospital. The team currently resides in the Prokit UK Essex Olympian League division 1 and has youth teams operating at under 8 level upward. The parish also contains the Runwell sports and social club which "was established over 70 years ago to provide sports and recreation facilities to the staff of Runwell Hospital". The sports club hosts a range of activities from football, rugby, archery, bowls, snooker and a model flying club. It has also recently installed a state of the art 3G floodlit all weather sports pitch.

== Occupations of residents ==
1881 Occupation Structure chart of Runwell

As shown from the 1881 Occupation Structure chart of Runwell, Agriculture was the main employment in Runwell back then. This was mainly due to the high volume of farmland surrounding the area and also the lack of opportunity and education available at that time. However, according to the 2011 census, this has now changed, as most of the 1,521 residents in employment now work in professional occupations or as managers, directors and senior officials. This is possibly due to the fact that education and advancement in transportation has meant people can find better more high paying jobs than they could in 1881.

== St Mary's church ==
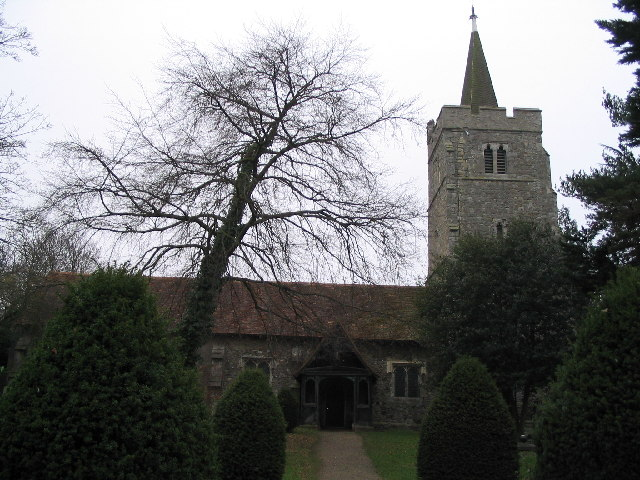
St Mary's church in Runwell

The local parish church in Runwell is St Mary's, which is located in the centre of the parish on Runwell Road. The building is a medieval structure and is a grade I listed building. The church is maintained by members of the congregation, and over the last decade the interior of the building has undergone significant repair and restoration. The church is also used as a "resource for local schools and colleges and has hosted retreats from other Parishes".
