= Rawreth =

Village in Essex, England

Coordinates: 51.610833°N 0.572500°E

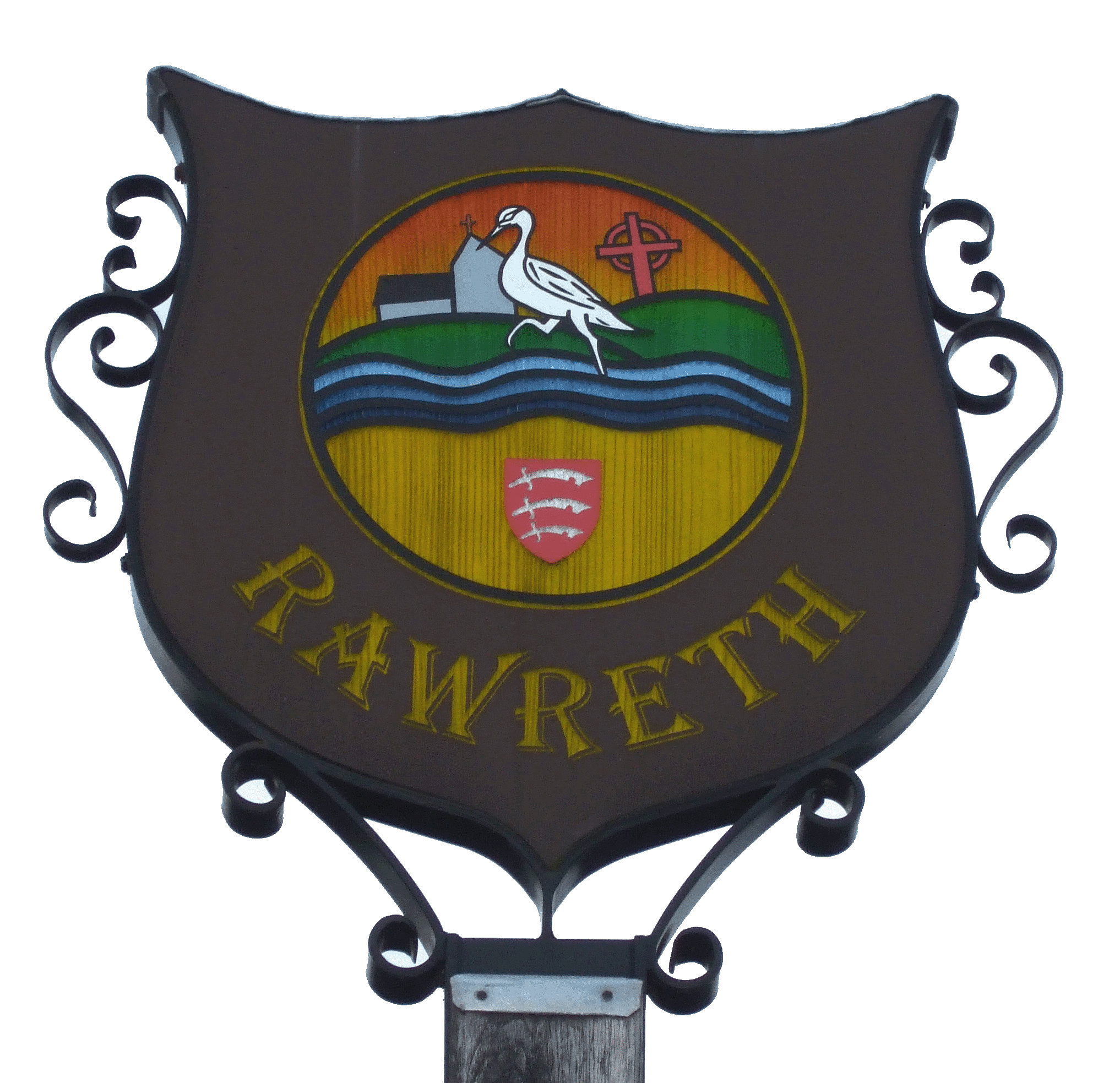
- Rawreth Village Sign, showing a heron and a stream

- Location within Essex
- Population: 1,245 (Parish, 2021)
- OS grid reference: TQ781934
- District: Rochford
- Shire county: Essex
- Region: East
- Country: England
- Sovereign state: United Kingdom
- Post town: Wickford
- Postcode district: SS11
- Dialling code: 01268
- Police: Essex
- Fire: Essex
- Ambulance: East of England
- UK Parliament: Rayleigh and Wickford

Rawreth is a village and civil parish in the District of Rochford, Essex, England. It is situated between Wickford and Rayleigh.

The place-name 'Rawreth' is first attested in the Pipe Rolls for 1177, where it appears as Raggerea. It appears as Ragherethe in the Feet of Fines for 1240, and as Raureth in the Charter Rolls of 1267. The name means 'herons' stream', as seen on the Village Sign (at right).

The area is mainly agricultural, sparsely populated, and with a small amount of industry.

Historically most of the farmhouses in Rawreth were moated manors, many of which survive today.

== Geography ==
A stream linked to the River Crouch passes under Church Road near to Rawreth Equestrian Centre. It joins the river near to the A1245 (old A130).

The milestone in the photo is marked on the Ordnance Survey map, grid reference TQ773930. It is located at the south end of Church Road very close to the bypassing new A130. There are a number of other map symbols in the Rawreth area. One is a blue horseshoe, which indicates horse riding or equitation.	Milestone

== Church ==
St Nicholas, Church Road. Medieval in design, only the tower is an original of that era, the majority of the building rebuilt in late Victorian times.

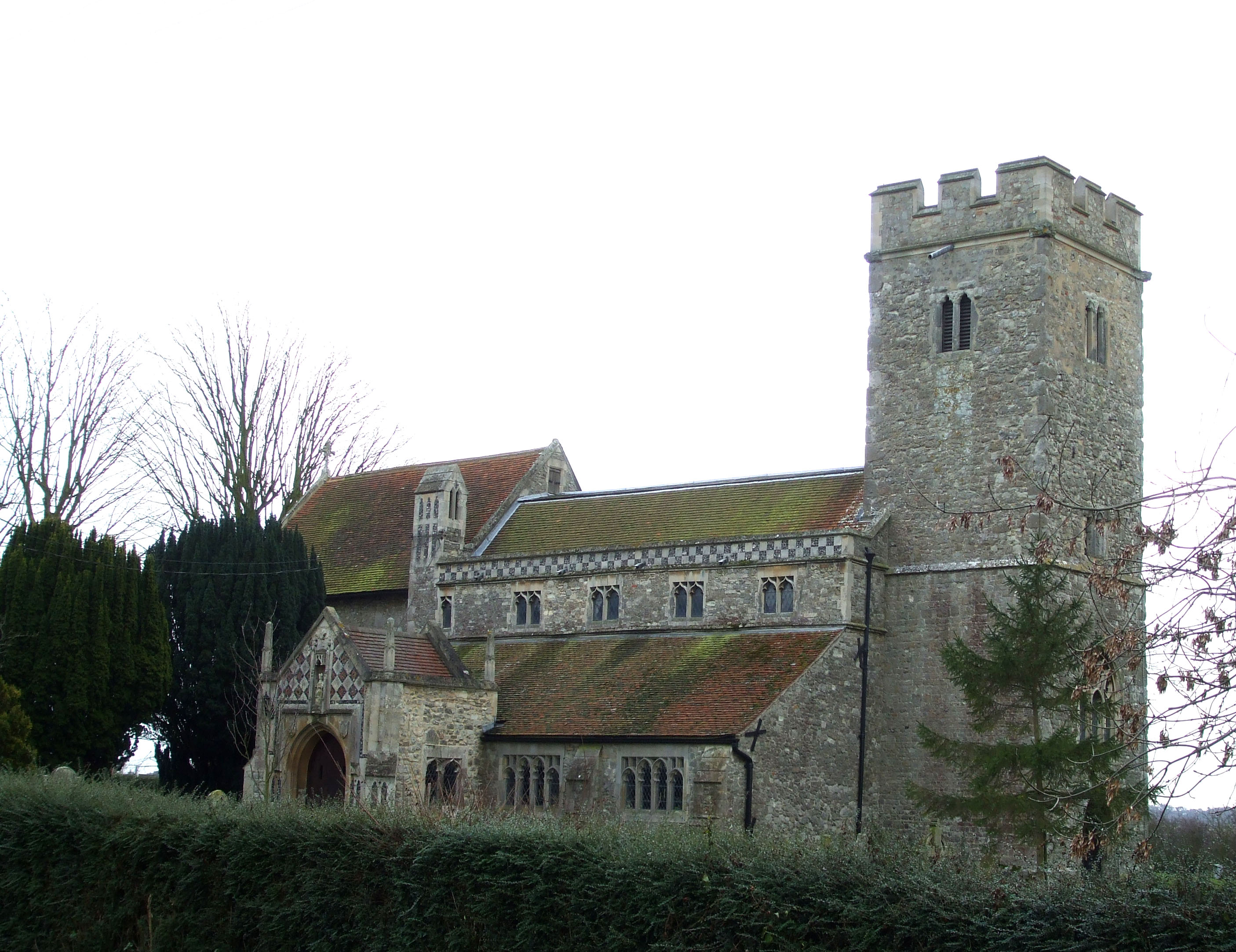
St Nicholas's Church Rawreth

== School ==
St Nicholas Church of England Primary School closed at its original location and has relocated to a new building just a few metres over the civil parish boundary into Rayleigh.

== Chichester Hotel ==
The Chichester Hotel is supposed to have derived its name from the Norman Knight, Sir John de Chichester, rumoured to have been the first occupant of Chichester Hall, a 13th-century moated farmhouse which still survives. However, during the 16th century the hall was the home of the Andrewes family, one of whom, Lancelot, became Bishop of Chichester (1605 - 1609), and it is more likely the hall was named by him for the eponymous city. In the early 18th century, the hall was home to Thomas Holt White FRS, brother of the celebrated naturalist Gilbert White. White raised the famous Chichester Elm cultivar from a tree which stood in the grounds.

== Governance ==
There are three tiers of local government covering Rawreth, at parish, district, and county level: Rawreth Parish Council, Rochford District Council, and Essex County Council. The parish council meets at the Free Church on Hawk Hill in Battlesbridge (Battlesbridge village straddles the parishes of Rawreth and Rettendon).

Rawreth was an ancient parish in the Rochford Hundred of Essex. When elected parish and district councils were established in 1894, the parish of Rawreth was included in the Rochford Rural District. In 1929, Rawreth and neighbouring Rayleigh were removed from the rural district to become the Rayleigh urban district. Rawreth remained a civil parish after 1929, but classed as an urban parish making it ineligible to have a parish council; Rayleigh Urban District Council was the lowest elected tier of local government between 1929 and 1974.

Rayleigh Urban District was abolished in 1974, when the area became part of the new Rochford district. As part of the 1974 reforms, the former urban district became unparished. A new parish of Rawreth was subsequently created in 1994.
