= Shotgate =

Suburb of Wickford in Essex, England

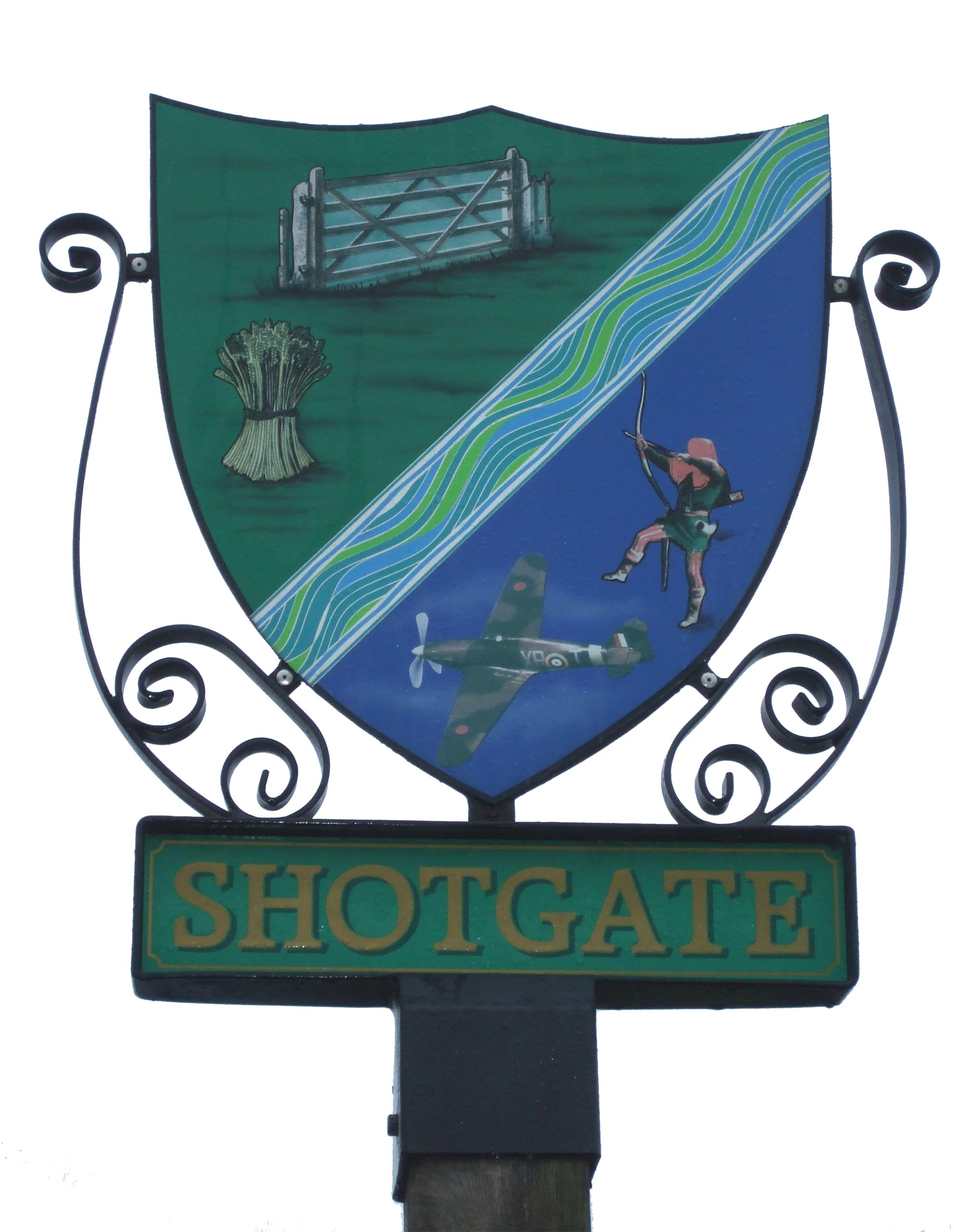
- Shotgate Sign

- Location within Essex
- Population: 3,632 (Parish, 2021)
- OS grid reference: TQ765925
- Civil parish: Shotgate
- District: Basildon
- Shire county: Essex
- Region: East
- Country: England
- Sovereign state: United Kingdom
- Post town: Wickford
- Postcode district: SS11
- Dialling code: 01268
- Police: Essex
- Fire: Essex
- Ambulance: East of England
- UK Parliament: Billericay

Shotgate is a suburb of the town of Wickford and a civil parish in the Basildon borough of Essex, England. At the 2021 census the parish had a population of 3,632.

== History ==
Mid-Iron Age pottery found at Shotgate Farm shows that the area was inhabited around 300 BC. In Roman times, a road ran from Ilford to Latchingdon through here. In the Saxon period commonhold land was often sliced into parallel strips known as 'Sceats'. This is the origin of the 'Shot' part of Shotgate, which has nothing to do with shooting or hunting. The Domesday Book of 1086 lists four farmsteads in Wickford, one of which was probably on the site of Shotgate. By 1300 this is listed as Ames or Aimes Farm. By 1540 the Rede family owned the farm, and one of its members, Elizabeth, emigrated to America to marry the son of the governor of Massachusetts, and is an ancestor of both former US president George W. Bush and presidential contender John Kerry.

In 1663, turnpike (toll) roads appeared in England, and one ran from Shenfield to Rayleigh until 1866 along the Old Southend Road, after which it was turned over to the Rochford Highway Board. During this period (1747), the Sharpe family renamed the Ames Farm as Shotgate Farm. Perhaps this indicated the existence of a tollgate at the Wickford / Rawreth boundary. During this period an inn, the King's Head, stood near present-day Oak Avenue. In 1907, houses were built as part of the plotlands initiative on Enfield Road and Oak Avenue. In 1921, the Archer family bought Shot Farm, and in 1927 sold land for development. This led to the foundation of modern-day Shotgate, consisting of Bruce Grove, 1st to 5th avenues and the shopping parades. In 1989, the village was greatly expanded by the Hodgsons Way Industrial Estate and housing estates, so named after the WW2 RAF Pilot Officer William Henry Hodgson, who was shot down but managed to ditch his Hurricane aircraft, avoiding the houses of the Shotgate estate.

== Shotgate sign ==
The sign is located next to the Southend Road (A129), it is made up of various symbols; Gate, Wheatsheaf, Archer, River, Hurricane.

- The gate is the way into and out of a SHOT of land.
- The wheatsheaf derives from the Wickford coat of arms.
- The archer represents the fact that land previously owned by the Archer family, sold in 1927, became known as the Shotgate Estate.
- The River Crouch was once much wider and deeper than today and its salt marshes covered what is now Shotgate.
- The Hurricane fighter recalls the incident on 31 May 1940, when RAF Pilot Officer William Henry Hodgson, a New Zealander, engaged hostile bombers and fighters over the River Thames in his Hawker Hurricane, but it was hit and caught fire. In attempting to return to his base at RAF Debden, he resisted bailing out, which would have left the aircraft to crash on a populated area and instead, crash landed in fields just outside Shotgate to avoid damage and injury to local people. He was awarded the Distinguished Flying Cross.

== Community Hall ==
Before the idea for a community hall had been conceived, many different groups were meeting on a regular basis in Shotgate. These included:

- Allotment Holders and Gardeners Association; This was formed in response to governments Dig for Victory appeal in 1942.
- Shotgate No. 1 Branch O.A.P. Club; Meetings were held at the Merly Club in Southend Road, which was located opposite where Fred's (F.H. Ives) Timber Yard now stands.
- Women's Institute; Meetings were held in the Baptist Church Hall. From this, the ‘Young Wives Group’ was formed ( which is now the ‘Shotgate Wives’).

Amongst the groups it was decided that a communal building would be needed for the village. A committee was formed and started to raise funds. This included a weekly collection of 6d (2½p) from each household, as well as from fetes and waste paper collections.

A plot of land in Bruce Grove was to be auctioned in 1952 and a request was made to the Urban District Council to reserve it for the committees. The land was purchased for £325.00 in 1955. A building sub-committee was formed to facilitate the building works. The hall was opened, free of debt, on Saturday 8 November 1958 by councillor Tanswell, the then Chairman of Basildon Council.

Some of the materials used in the construction of the building were reclaimed such as the wooden wall panelling which was from a public house in the East End of London and the flooring was from American pre-fabricated buildings. The doors came from Fred's Scrap Yard (now known as Fred's (F.H. Ives) Timber Yard).

The committee raised £1200, and with further grants from the Ministry of Education (United Kingdom) for £1218 a grand total of £2418 was reached. The hall would have cost more than this to construct had it not been for the free labour given by local volunteers.

The hall has been extended and refurbished several times since being built originally with the most recent being in 2007 when a disabled toilet was added.

The hall is, to this day, still free from debt. It is run by the Shotgate Community Association and funded by the monies raised from hiring out the hall, membership fees and donations. It is not subsidised by the council or any other organisation.

== Nature reserves ==
There are two adjoining nature reserves. Shotgate Thickets form the northern part of this reserve, which is owned by the Essex Wildlife Trust. The southern part of the reserve is owned by Basildon Borough Council and is named Giddings Copse, in memory of the co-founder and ex-Chairman of the Wickford Wildlife Society - Phil Giddings. The reserve is situated on both sides of the tidal River Crouch which is narrow at this point. It consists of a remnant of old oak woodland on the south side, and thorn thickets, rough grassland and large ponds on the north side. With the adjoining river banks and railway embankment this small area has a surprising diversity of habitats and, consequently, of wildlife.

== Governance ==
There are three tiers of local government covering Shotgate, at parish, district, and county level: Shotgate Parish Council, Basildon Borough Council, and Essex County Council. The parish council meets at the church hall of Shotgate Baptist Church on Bruce Grove.

The Shotgate area historically stood at the boundary of the parishes of Rawreth and Wickford. The buildings of Shotgate Farm are in Rawreth parish, but the area to the west of the farm buildings where the modern suburb was developed during the 20th century was in Wickford parish.

When elected parish and district councils were established in 1894, Wickford was included in the Billericay Rural District. Most of that rural district, including the parish of Wickford, was converted into the Billericay Urban District in 1934. The parish of Wickford was abolished in 1937 when all the parishes in the urban district were merged into a single parish called Billericay. The urban district was renamed Basildon in 1955 and was reformed to become the modern Basildon district in 1974, at which point the district also became an unparished area.

The civil parish of Shotgate was created in 2007 from part of the unparished area.

Although a separate parish since 2007, Shotgate is still classed as part of the Wickford built up area by the Office for National Statistics.

== Listed buildings ==
There are two grade II listed buildings recorded in the National Heritage List for England for Shotgate.

Name	Grade	Location	Type	Completed (Note: The date given is the date used by Historic England as significant for the initial building or that of an important part in the structure's description.)	Date designated	Grid ref. (Note: The grid reference is based on the British national grid reference system, sometimes known as OSGB36, used by the Ordnance Survey.) Geo-coordinates	Notes	Entry number (Note: The "List Entry Number" is a unique number assigned to each listed building and scheduled monument by Historic England.)	Image	Wikidata
Barn at Shot Farm to South West	II	Southend Road			4 July 1955	TQ7701593450; 51°36′43″N 0°33′19″E		1170786	Upload Photo	Q26464451
Shot Farmhouse	II	Southend Road			4 July 1955	TQ7706393487; 51°36′45″N 0°33′21″E		1338410	Upload Photo	Q26622731
