= Arvid Carlsson =

Swedish neuroscientist (1923–2018)

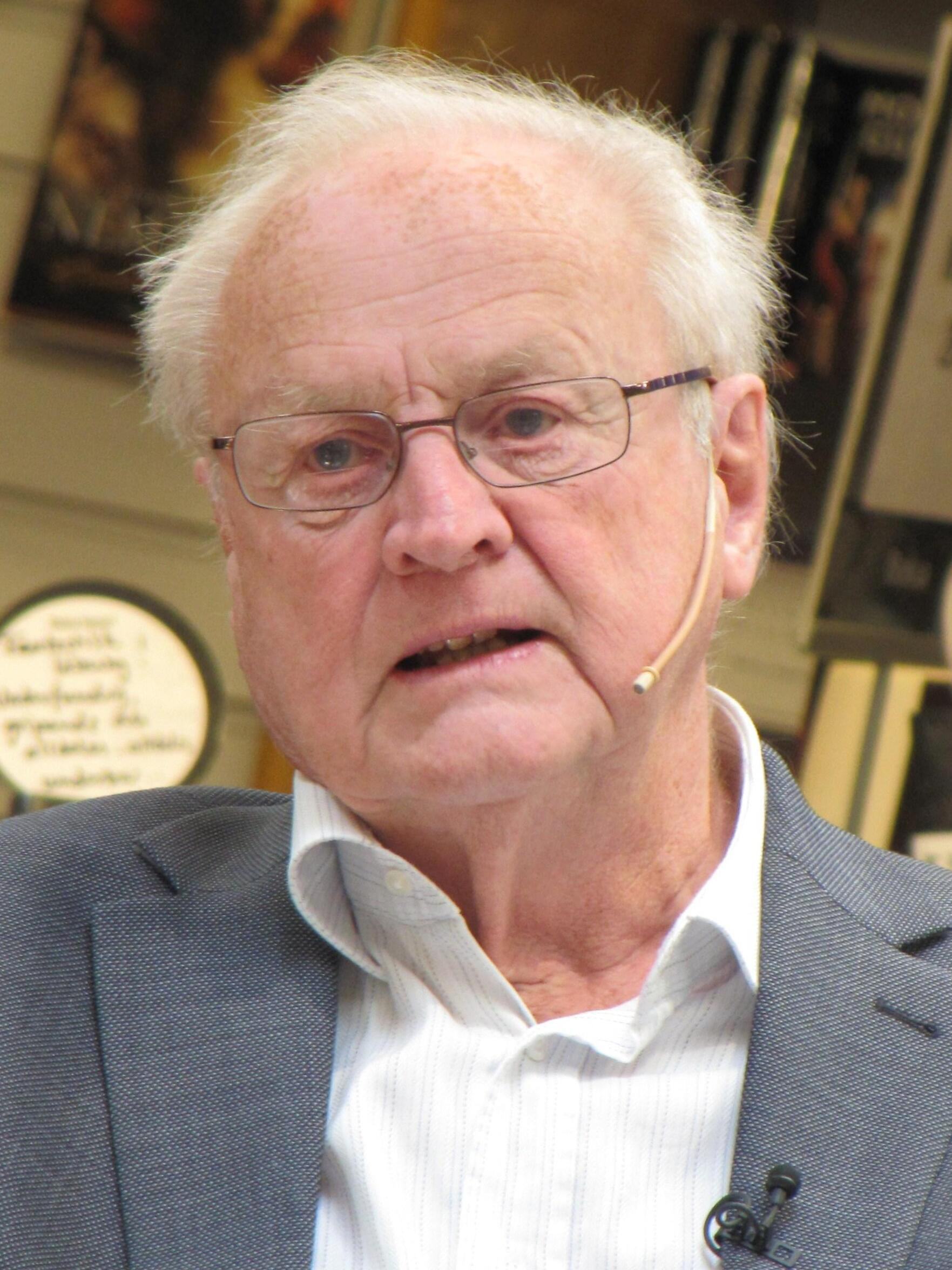
- Carlsson in 2011
- Born: 25 January 1923; Uppsala, Sweden
- Died: 29 June 2018 (aged 95); Gothenburg, Sweden
- Education: Lund University
- Known for: Dopamine
- Awards: Wolf Prize in Medicine (1979); Japan Prize (1994); Feltrinelli International Award (1999); Nobel Prize in Physiology or Medicine (2000)
- Scientific career
- Workplaces: University of Gothenburg

Arvid Carlsson (25 January 1923 – 29 June 2018) was a Swedish neuropharmacologist who is best known for his work with the neurotransmitter dopamine and its effects in Parkinson's disease. For his work on dopamine, Carlsson was awarded the Nobel Prize in Physiology or Medicine in 2000, together with Eric Kandel and Paul Greengard.

== Early life and education ==
Carlsson was born on 25 January 1923 in Uppsala, Sweden, one of four siblings. His family moved to Lund after his father became a history professor at Lund University. Although his two older siblings followed their father's career path, he instead chose to study medicine at Lund, beginning in 1941.

In 1944, he participated in the task of examining prisoners of Nazi concentration camps, whom Swedish aristocrat Folke Bernadotte had managed to bring to Sweden, which was neutral during World War II. He received his MD and PhD in pharmacology in 1951.

== Career ==
In 1951, Carlsson became an associate professor at Lund University. He spent five months as a research fellow for the pharmacologist Bernard Beryl Brodie at the National Heart Institute in Bethesda, Maryland, United States, and the change in his research focus to psychopharmacology eventually led to his Nobel Prize. In 1959 he became a professor at the University of Gothenburg.

In 1957 Katharine Montagu demonstrated the presence of dopamine in the human brain; later that same year Carlsson also demonstrated that dopamine was a neurotransmitter in the brain and not just a precursor for norepinephrine. Carlsson went on to develop a method for measuring the amount of dopamine in brain tissues. He found that dopamine levels in the basal ganglia, a brain area important for movement, were particularly high. He then showed that giving animals the drug reserpine caused a decrease in dopamine levels and a loss of movement control. These effects were similar to the symptoms of Parkinson's disease. By administering to these animals L-Dopa, which is the precursor of dopamine, he could alleviate the symptoms. These findings led other doctors to try using L-Dopa in patients with Parkinson's disease, and it was found to alleviate some of the symptoms in the early stages of the disease. L-Dopa is still the basis for most commonly used means of treating Parkinson's disease.

Carlson collaborated with the drug company Astra AB (now AstraZeneca) during the 1970s and the 1980s. He and his colleagues were able to derive the first marketed selective serotonin reuptake inhibitor (SSRI), zimelidine, from brompheniramine. Zimelidine was later withdrawn from the market due to rare cases of Guillain–Barré syndrome, but Carlson's research paved the way for fluoxetine (Prozac), one of the most widely used prescription medicines in the world.

Carlsson was still an active researcher and speaker when he was over 90 years old and, together with his daughter Lena, he worked on OSU6162, a dopamine stabilizer which alleviates symptoms of post-stroke fatigue.

== Honours and awards ==
Carlsson's research on the brain's chemical signals and the resulting treatment for Parkinson's disease earned him the 2000 Nobel Prize in Physiology or Medicine, which he shared with Paul Greengard and Eric R. Kandel. He won many other awards including Israel's Wolf Prize in Medicine (1979), the Japan Prize (1994), and Italy's Feltrinelli Prize (1999). He was elected as a member of the Royal Swedish Academy of Sciences in 1975. He was awarded an honorary Doctor of Medicine from the University of Catania, and an honorary Doctor of Science from the University of Southern California in 2007.

== Personal life ==
Carlsson married Ulla-Lisa Christoffersson in 1945 and they had three sons and two daughters. His daughter Maria was his lab manager and his daughter Lena was one of his collaborators.

He opposed the fluoridation of drinking water in Sweden. He was a vocal opponent of homeopathy and worked to prevent homeopathic preparations from being classified as medication in Sweden.

Carlsson died on 29 June 2018, at the age of 95.

== Drugs ==
1. 7-OH-DPAT
2. 8-OH-DPAT
3. Coprine & Benzcoprine
4. DS-121
5. HW-165
6. FLA-57
7. Preclamol
8. Rotigotine
9. UH-232
10. Zimelidine & Nomelidine
