= Listed buildings in Wickford =

Civil Parish in Essex, England

Wickford is a town in the Borough of Basildon of Essex, England. It contains nine grade II listed buildings that are recorded in the National Heritage List for England.

This list is based on the information retrieved online from Historic England.

== Key ==
| Grade | Criteria |
|---|---|
| I | Buildings that are of exceptional interest |
| II* | Particularly important buildings of more than special interest |
| II | Buildings that are of special interest |

== Listing ==
| Name | Grade | Location | Type | Completed (Note: The date given is the date used by Historic England as significant for the initial building or that of an important part in the structure's description.) | Date designated | Grid ref. (Note: The grid reference is based on the British national grid reference system, sometimes known as OSGB36, used by the Ordnance Survey.) Geo-coordinates | Notes | Entry number (Note: The "List Entry Number" is a unique number assigned to each listed building and scheduled monument by Historic England.) | Image | Wikidata |
|---|---|---|---|---|---|---|---|---|---|---|
| Great Broomfields | II | Cranfield Park Road | | | 6 January 1975 | TQ7482291873; 51°35′55″N 0°31′22″E | | 1122257 | Upload Photo | Q26415398 |
| War Memorials at Dollyman's Farm | II | Doublegate Lane, Rawreth, SS11 8UD | | | 2 March 2018 | TQ7753891450; 51°35′38″N 0°33′42″E | | 1453844 | Upload Photo | Q66479426 |
| 34, London Road | II | 34, London Road | | | 7 September 1981 | TQ7437493313; 51°36′42″N 0°31′01″E | | 1338397 | Upload Photo | Q26622722 |
| Milestone at Junction of London Road and Nevendon Road | II | London Road | | | 6 June 1990 | TQ7455893276; 51°36′41″N 0°31′11″E | | 1122214 | Upload Photo | Q26415356 |
| Nevendon Manor | II | Nevendon Road | | | 4 July 1955 | TQ7390491911; 51°35′57″N 0°30′34″E | | 1170808 | Upload Photo | Q26464485 |
| Fore Riders | II | Old Nevendon Road, SS12 0QD | house | | 6 January 1975 | TQ7365191189; 51°35′34″N 0°30′20″E | | 1170829 | Fore Riders More images | Q26464510 |
| Guinea Pig Hall | II | 61, Runwell Road | | | 6 January 1975 | TQ7511393999; 51°37′03″N 0°31′41″E | | 1122244 | Upload Photo | Q26415389 |
| 65 and 67, Runwell Road | II | 65 and 67, Runwell Road | building | | 6 January 1975 | TQ7511894024; 51°37′04″N 0°31′41″E | | 1338413 | 65 and 67, Runwell Road More images | Q26622734 |
| Church of St Catherine | II | Southend Road | church building | | 4 July 1955 | TQ7548793508; 51°36′47″N 0°31′59″E | | 1338415 | Church of St Catherine More images | Q26622736 |

== See also ==
- Grade I listed buildings in Essex
- Grade II* listed buildings in Essex

== Sources ==
- Bettley, James; Pevsner, Nikolaus (2007) [1954], Essex, The Buildings of England, New Haven and London: Yale University Press, ISBN 978-0-300-11614-4
