= Listed buildings in Basildon =

Non-Civil Parish in Essex, England

Basildon is a town in the Borough of Basildon of Essex, England. It contains 29 listed buildings that are recorded in the National Heritage List for England. Of these one is grade I, three are grade II* and 25 are grade II.

This list is based on the information retrieved online from Historic England.

== Key ==
| Grade | Criteria |
|---|---|
| I | Buildings that are of exceptional interest |
| II* | Particularly important buildings of more than special interest |
| II | Buildings that are of special interest |

== Listing ==
| Name | Grade | Location | Type | Completed (Note: The date given is the date used by Historic England as significant for the initial building or that of an important part in the structure's description.) | Date designated | Grid ref. (Note: The grid reference is based on the British national grid reference system, sometimes known as OSGB36, used by the Ordnance Survey.) Geo-coordinates | Notes | Entry number (Note: The "List Entry Number" is a unique number assigned to each listed building and scheduled monument by Historic England.) | Image | Wikidata |
|---|---|---|---|---|---|---|---|---|---|---|
| Hawkesbury Manor | II | Bells Hill Road, Vange | | | 24 March 1950 | TQ7033286795; 51°33′16″N 0°27′20″E | | 1338396 | Upload Photo | Q26622721 |
| Wayletts | II | Brentwood Road, Dunton | | | 4 July 1955 | TQ6564490009; 51°35′05″N 0°23′22″E | | 1121459 | Upload Photo | Q26270175 |
| Church of St Nicholas | I | Church Hill, Laindon, Billericay | church building | | 24 March 1950 | TQ6879289515; 51°34′45″N 0°26′05″E | | 1338377 | Church of St Nicholas More images | Q17535738 |
| Church of St Peter | II* | Church Lane, Nevendon, Wickford | church building | | 24 March 1950 | TQ7343990778; 51°35′21″N 0°30′08″E | | 1122250 | Church of St Peter More images | Q17557049 |
| Church of St Michael | II | Church Path, Pitsea, SS13 3JX | church building | | 24 March 1950 | TQ7385287780; 51°33′44″N 0°30′24″E | | 1338378 | Church of St Michael More images | Q26622707 |
| Church of Holy Cross | II* | Church Road | church building | | 24 March 1950 | TQ7139289819; 51°34′52″N 0°28′20″E | | 1122252 | Church of Holy Cross More images | Q17557058 |
| Church of St Mary | II | Church Road, Dunton | church building | | 4 July 1955 | TQ6534388324; 51°34′10″N 0°23′04″E | | 1122253 | Church of St Mary More images | Q26415396 |
| Dunton Hall | II | Church Road, Dunton | | | 6 January 1975 | TQ6535488264; 51°34′08″N 0°23′04″E | | 1338380 | Upload Photo | Q26622708 |
| Dry Street Farmhouse | II | Dry Street | farmhouse | | 24 March 1950 | TQ6973886708; 51°33′13″N 0°26′49″E | | 1170033 | Dry Street Farmhouse More images | Q26463289 |
| Rose Cottage | II | Dry Street | | | 6 January 1975 | TQ6862686419; 51°33′05″N 0°25′51″E | | 1170028 | Upload Photo | Q26463281 |
| Thatched Cottage | II | Dry Street | | | 6 January 1975 | TQ6923886522; 51°33′08″N 0°26′23″E | | 1122258 | Upload Photo | Q26415400 |
| Westley Hall | II | Homestead Drive, Langdon Hills | | | 6 January 1975 | TQ6847486878; 51°33′20″N 0°25′44″E | | 1338408 | Upload Photo | Q26622729 |
| War Memorial | II | Howard Crescent | statue | | 26 September 2005 | TQ7417888249; 51°33′58″N 0°30′42″E | | 1392754 | War Memorial More images | Q26671962 |
| Rose Cottage, Ivy Cottage | II | Ivy Cottage, Dunton Road, Dunton | | | 6 January 1975 | TQ6643090295; 51°35′13″N 0°24′03″E | | 1122259 | Upload Photo | Q26415401 |
| Bell Farmhouse | II | London Road, Ramsden Bellhouse, Wickford | | | 6 January 1975 | TQ7315393099; 51°36′36″N 0°29′57″E | | 1305927 | Upload Photo | Q26592751 |
| Church of All Saints | II* | London Road, Vange | church building | | 4 July 1955 | TQ7150386723; 51°33′12″N 0°28′21″E | | 1122235 | Church of All Saints More images | Q4729535 |
| The Five Bell Inn | II | London Road, Vange | inn | | 24 March 1950 | TQ7094286533; 51°33′06″N 0°27′51″E | | 1338411 | The Five Bell Inn More images | Q26622732 |
| Woolshots' Farmhouse | II | London Road, Ramsden Bellhouse, Wickford | farmhouse | | 6 January 1975 | TQ7234192895; 51°36′31″N 0°29′15″E | | 1122234 | Woolshots' Farmhouse More images | Q26415378 |
| Nevendon Hall | II | Nevendon Road, Nevendon, Wickford | | | 24 March 1950 | TQ7344190839; 51°35′23″N 0°30′08″E | | 1170802 | Upload Photo | Q26464476 |
| 1 and 2, Paynters Hill | II | 1 and 2, Paynters Hill, SS16 4RG, Vange | | | 24 March 1950 | TQ7217487317; 51°33′30″N 0°28′56″E | | 1122261 | Upload Photo | Q26415403 |
| Cromwell Manor | II | Pitsea Hall Lane, Pitsea, SS16 4UH | building | | 24 March 1950 | TQ7368087523; 51°33′35″N 0°30′15″E | | 1122236 | Cromwell Manor More images | Q26415379 |
| Doves Farmhouse | II | Pound Lane, Laindon, Billericay | | | 24 March 1950 | TQ6862989937; 51°34′59″N 0°25′57″E | | 1122208 | Upload Photo | Q26415349 |
| Retaining Walls, Ramp, Steps, Staircases, Bench and Raised Paving | II | Ramp, Steps, Staircases, Bench And Raised Paving, East Square | | | 22 December 1998 | TQ7054688609; 51°34′14″N 0°27′34″E | | 1271498 | Upload Photo | Q26561442 |
| Great Chalvedon Hall | II | Rectory Road, Pitsea | house | | 24 March 1950 | TQ7424489255; 51°34′31″N 0°30′47″E | | 1305868 | Great Chalvedon Hall More images | Q26592695 |
| Church of St Mary | II | South Hill, Langdon Hills | church building | | 20 July 1995 | TQ6784786464; 51°33′08″N 0°25′10″E | | 1235020 | Church of St Mary More images | Q26528384 |
| Barstable School | II | Timberlog Lane | | | 30 March 1993 | TQ7261088956; 51°34′23″N 0°29′22″E | | 1235004 | Upload Photo | Q4865017 |
| Brooke House | II | 1-84, Town Square | | | 22 December 1998 | TQ7053888617; 51°34′14″N 0°27′34″E | | 1271497 | Upload Photo | Q26561441 |
| Raised Pool and Sculpture | II | Town Square | | | 22 December 1998 | TQ7051588589; 51°34′13″N 0°27′33″E | | 1271562 | Upload Photo | Q26561504 |
| Little Cooper's Cottage | II | Wat Tyler Park, Pitsea Hall Lane, Pitsea, SS16 4UH | thatched cottage | | 20 June 1980 | TQ7374687145; 51°33′23″N 0°30′18″E | | 1122213 | Little Cooper's Cottage More images | Q26415355 |

|}

== See also ==
- Grade I listed buildings in Essex
- Grade II* listed buildings in Essex

== Sources ==
- Bettley, James; Pevsner, Nikolaus (2007) [1954], Essex, The Buildings of England, New Haven and London: Yale University Press, ISBN 978-0-300-11614-4
