= Listed buildings in Little Burstead =

Civil Parish in Essex, England

Little Burstead is a village and civil parish in the Borough of Basildon of Essex, England. It contains eleven listed buildings that are recorded in the National Heritage List for England. Of these two are grade II* and nine are grade II.

This list is based on the information retrieved online from Historic England.

== Key ==
| Grade | Criteria |
|---|---|
| I | Buildings that are of exceptional interest |
| II* | Particularly important buildings of more than special interest |
| II | Buildings that are of special interest |

== Listing ==
| Name | Grade | Location | Type | Completed (Note: The date given is the date used by Historic England as significant for the initial building or that of an important part in the structure's description.) | Date designated | Grid ref. (Note: The grid reference is based on the British national grid reference system, sometimes known as OSGB36, used by the Ordnance Survey.) Geo-coordinates | Notes | Entry number (Note: The "List Entry Number" is a unique number assigned to each listed building and scheduled monument by Historic England.) | Image | Wikidata |
|---|---|---|---|---|---|---|---|---|---|---|
| Botney Hill Farmhouse | II | Botney Hill Road | | | 6 January 1975 | TQ6528091731; 51°36′01″N 0°23′06″E | | 1322862 | Upload Photo | Q26608641 |
| Hope House | II | Clock House Road | | | 6 January 1975 | TQ6667992150; 51°36′13″N 0°24′20″E | | 1306258 | Upload Photo | Q26593056 |
| Hatches Farmhouse | II | Hatches Farm Road | | | 4 July 1955 | TQ6603892269; 51°36′17″N 0°23′46″E | | 1170037 | Upload Photo | Q26463298 |
| Coopers Cottage | II | Laindon Common Road | cottage | | 28 April 2006 | TQ6672292142; 51°36′12″N 0°24′22″E | | 1391665 | Coopers Cottage More images | Q26671018 |
| The Elms | II | Laindon Common Road | | | 6 January 1975 | TQ6670792225; 51°36′15″N 0°24′21″E | | 1122232 | Upload Photo | Q26415376 |
| Church of St Mary | II* | Rectory Road | church building | | 4 July 1955 | TQ6684891546; 51°35′53″N 0°24′27″E | | 1170867 | Church of St Mary More images | Q17557075 |
| K6 Telephone Kiosk (to South East of War Memorial) | II | Rectory Road | K6 telephone box | | 17 February 1989 | TQ6670792102; 51°36′11″N 0°24′21″E | | 1275858 | K6 Telephone Kiosk (to South East of War Memorial) More images | Q26565414 |
| Raybourne Cottage | II | Rectory Road | | | 6 January 1975 | TQ6705490872; 51°35′31″N 0°24′37″E | | 1122243 | Upload Photo | Q26415388 |
| Sudbury's Farmhouse | II | Sudbury's Farm Road | | | 6 January 1975 | TQ6526592864; 51°36′37″N 0°23′07″E | | 1170946 | Upload Photo | Q26464653 |
| Salmons Farmhouse | II | Tye Common Road | | | 6 January 1975 | TQ6582492968; 51°36′40″N 0°23′37″E | | 1338435 | Upload Photo | Q26622755 |
| Stockwell Hall | II* | Tye Common Road | | | 4 July 1955 | TQ6643092313; 51°36′18″N 0°24′07″E | | 1122207 | Upload Photo | Q17557041 |

== See also ==
- Grade I listed buildings in Essex
- Grade II* listed buildings in Essex

== Sources ==
- Bettley, James; Pevsner, Nikolaus (2007) [1954], Essex, The Buildings of England, New Haven and London: Yale University Press, ISBN 978-0-300-11614-4
