= Wickford =

Town and civil parish in Essex, England

Coordinates: 51.6114°N 0.5207°E

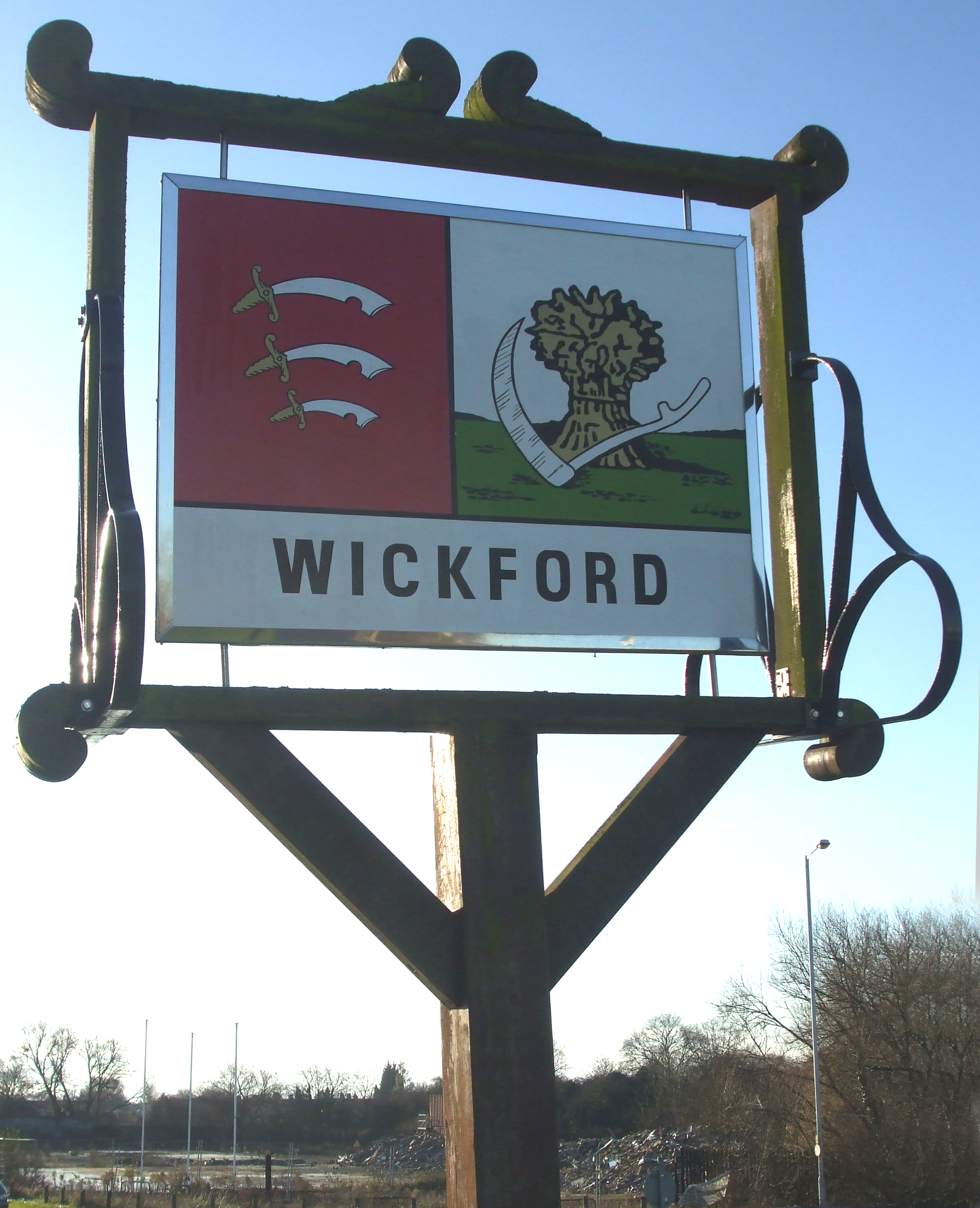
- The town's sign

- Location within Essex
- Population: 27,601 (Parish, 2021); (Note: To obtain individual parish data, use the query function on table PP002.) (Note: The civil parish of Wickford did not exist at the time of the 2021 census, formally coming into being in 2022. The ONS uses the parish boundaries, as they existed in 2022, to report the populations on census night in 2021; it therefore reports a population for the Wickford parish.); 27,535 (Built-up area, 2021)
- OS grid reference: TQ746932
- Civil parish: Wickford
- District: Basildon
- Shire county: Essex
- Region: East
- Country: England
- Sovereign state: United Kingdom
- Post town: WICKFORD
- Postcode district: SS11, SS12
- Dialling code: 01268
- Police: Essex
- Fire: Essex
- Ambulance: East of England
- UK Parliament: Rayleigh and Wickford

Wickford is a town and civil parish in the Borough of Basildon of Essex, England. It is located approximately 30 miles (48 km) east of London and 4 miles (6 km) north-east of Basildon. At the 2021 census, the parish had a population of 27,601 and the built-up area, as defined by the Office for National Statistics, was 27,535.

Wickford has a main high street which includes a wide range of shops; it also has a swimming pool, library, open-air market and a community centre within the vicinity of the town centre.

== History ==
There is evidence that the area was inhabited in prehistoric times. The tribe of ancient Britons called the Trinovantes also lived in the area. There was a Roman military marching camp on the Beauchamps Farm site, which was succeeded by a Roman villa. This is now the site of Beauchamps High School.

The name Wickford is first attested in a Saxon charter of 995, where it appears as Wicford. The "-ford" indicates a crossing of the river Crouch, but there are a number of theories as to the meaning of the "Wick-" element; it may refer to wych elm, a dairy or other specialised farm, or sheep.

In the Domesday Book of 1086, there were nine estates or manors at the vill of Wicfort or Wincfort in the Barstable Hundred of Essex. The two main estates were the manor of Wickford Hall and the manor of Stilemans. Robert Wikeford or de Wickford (c.1320–90), Archbishop of Dublin, was born in the town and his family are thought to have been Lords of the Manor of Wickford Hall.

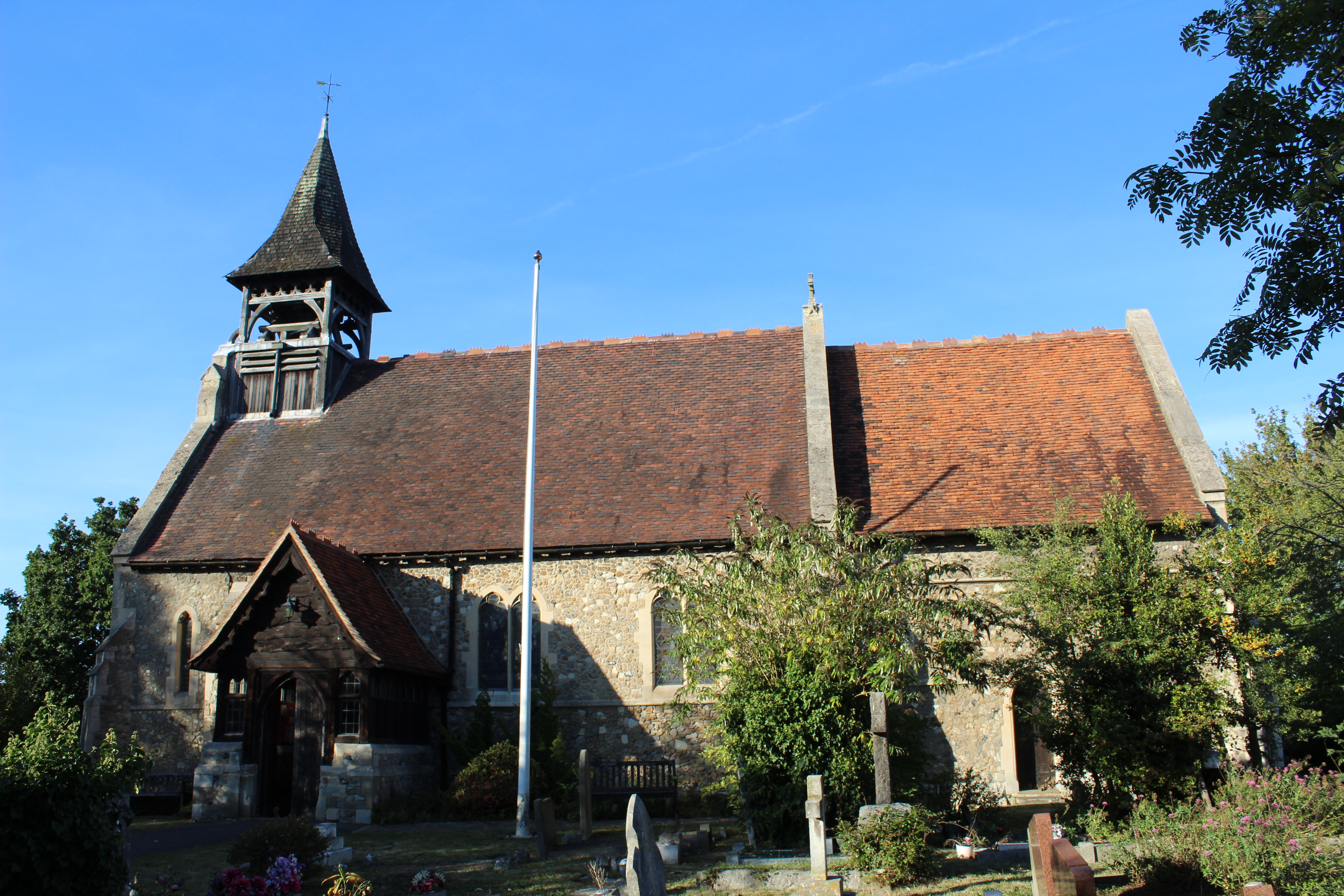
St Catherine's Church

No priest or church is mentioned in any of the Wickford entries in the Domesday Book, but Wickford became a parish. Its parish church, dedicated to St Catherine, stands on high ground along Southend Road, to the east of the Crouch. The church was rebuilt in 1875–1876, replacing a medieval building on the same site.

Before the 20th century, Wickford was an agricultural village. Its original core was centred around the church; the manor house of Wickford Hall formerly stood immediately to its east. Over time, the commercial centre of Wickford has migrated westwards towards the modern High Street on the western side of the river Crouch.

Wickford railway station opened to passengers in 1889 on the Shenfield–Southend line of the Great Eastern Railway; later that year, it became a junction station when the Crouch Valley line to Southminster was opened. The arrival of the railway encouraged the growth of the town.

=== Second World War ===
During the Second World War, the edge of the town was hit by a German doodlebug and, on 6 December 1944, a V-2 rocket fell in Branksome Avenue, about 1 mile (1.6 km) west of the town centre. Around the town, in amongst the hedgerows and fields, there are numerous pillboxes which were constructed as a part of British anti-invasion preparations.

=== 1958 flood ===
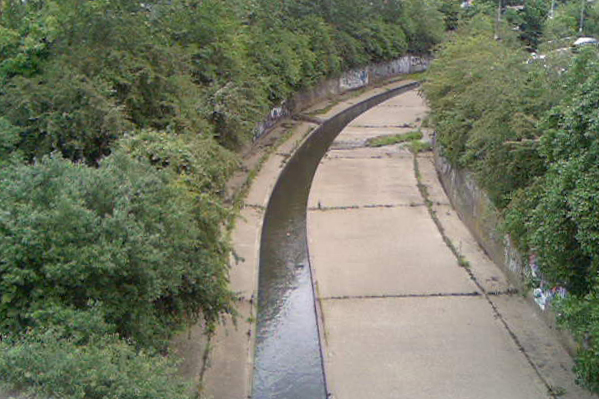
The river Crouch flows through Wickford in a concrete channel, which is designed to protect the town from flooding

In 1958, Wickford town centre was hit by a flood that made the national news headlines. The most striking image of the flood was that of a double-decker bus, left stranded at Halls Corner overnight, partly submerged by the floodwater. A second flood, in 1960, meant that changes were made to the course of the river Crouch; this included running it in a concrete channel through the centre of the town.

=== Regeneration ===
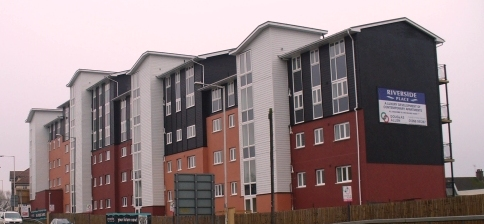
Riverside Place Phase 1 complete

There have been a number of proposals to regenerate the town centre in recent years. A town centre masterplan was adopted by Basildon Council in 2006, followed by a town centre regeneration strategy in 2013. Some of the proposals in these plans have been delivered and further plans for the regeneration of the town centre continue to be considered.

=== Naturism ===
Wickford became the birthplace of Naturism in the United Kingdom; in 1924, the English Gymnosophist Society was formed and had its home in the town.

== Geography ==
For the most part, Wickford is flat and lies 10 metres (33 ft) above sea level; the highest point is 74 metres (243 ft), on the outskirts of the town. The river Crouch flows through the town, from the west to the east; the river Wick flows into it from the south.

The Office for National Statistics defines a Wickford built-up area, which also covers Shotgate, forming its own parish separate from the town; it had a population of 27,535 at the 2021 census. Immediately adjoining it to the north is the Runwell built-up area, which is includes the parts of the Wickford parish north of the railway line and the river Crouch; its population was 8,085 in 2021.

Wick Country Park comprises 50 acres (20 ha) of former agricultural land, with around 1 1/4 miles (2.0 km) of easy access trails around the site. The trails leads visitors past old hedgerows, the 5-acre (2.0 ha) lake, ponds, World War II pillboxes and recent woodland plantings; bridges and boardwalks allow the trails to continue over the North Benfleet brook.

== Governance ==
There are three tiers of local government covering Wickford at parish (town), district and county level: Wickford Town Council, Basildon Borough Council and Essex County Council. The town council generally meets at the Wick Community Centre and has an office at Wych Elm House on Nevendon Road.

=== Administrative history ===
Wickford was an ancient parish in the Barstable Hundred of Essex. When elected parish and district councils were established in 1894, Wickford was given a parish council and included in the Billericay Rural District.

In 1934, most of the rural district, including the parish of Wickford, was converted into the Billericay Urban District. The parishes within it were then classed as urban parishes and so became ineligible to have their own parish councils. All the civil parishes within the urban district were merged into a single parish called Billericay in 1937. The urban district was renamed Basildon in 1955 and was reformed to become the modern Basildon district in 1974, at which point the district also became an unparished area.

In 2007, part of the area of the pre-1937 parish of Wickford was made the new parish of Shotgate.

In 2022, a new civil parish was created, with its parish council taking the name Wickford Town Council.

== Transport ==
=== Railway ===
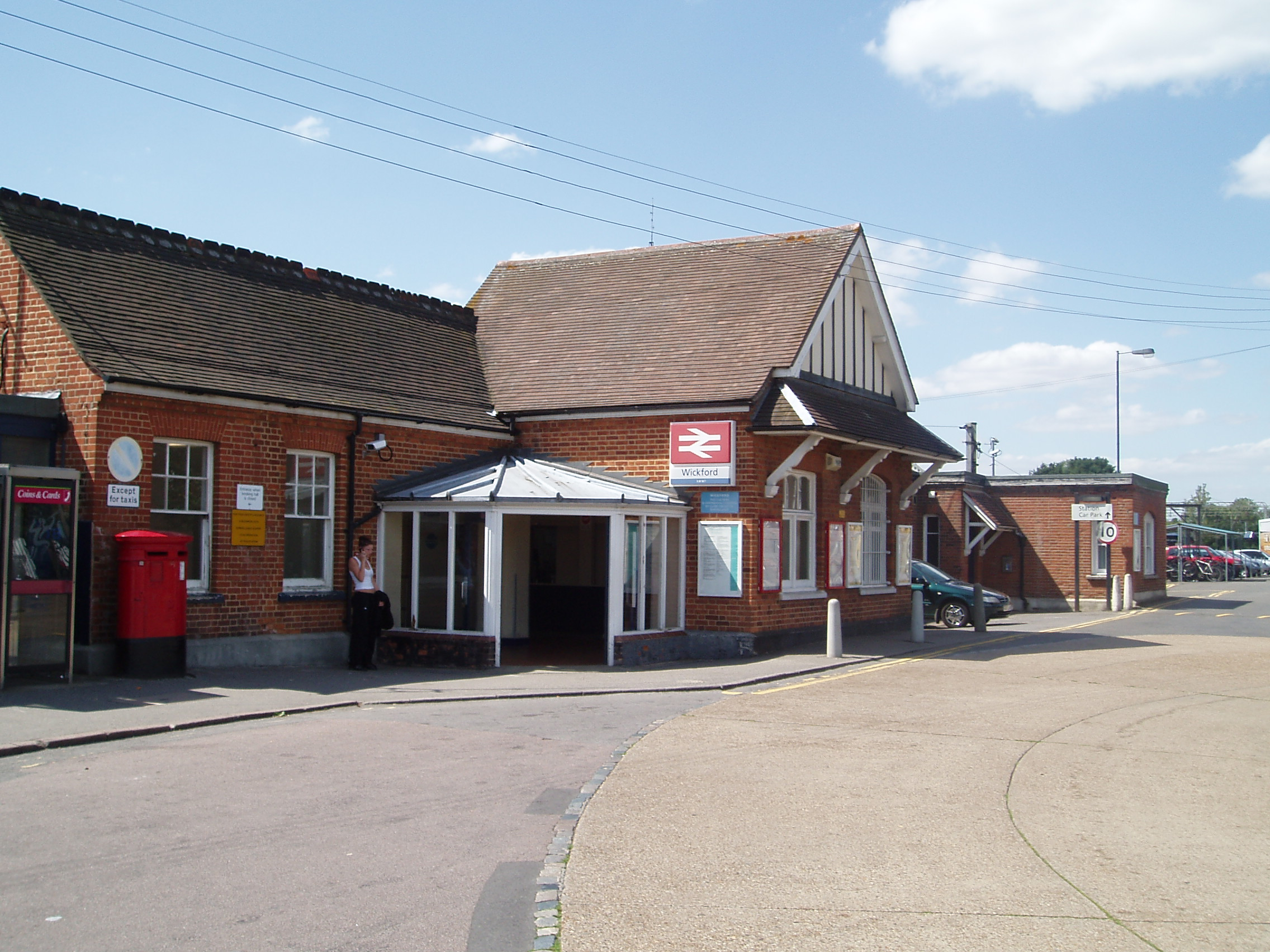
The former station entrance, before it was demolished in 2021

Wickford railway station is managed by Greater Anglia, which also operates its passenger services on two lines:

- Shenfield to Southend Line for trains between London Liverpool Street and Southend Victoria; a journey to London takes approximately 40 minutes
- Crouch Valley line to Southminster.

=== Buses ===
Bus services in Wickford are operated primarily by First Essex, but also by Stephensons of Essex and NIBS Buses. Routes include:

- X10 Basildon - Wickford - Chelmsford - Stansted Airport
- 13 Wickford - West Hanningfield - Chelmsford
- 25 Basildon - Wickford - Rayleigh - Southend-on-Sea
- 251 Warley - Brentwood - Billericay - Wickford.

=== Roads ===
The town can be reached easily via the A127, which connects east London and Southend-on-Sea, and by the A130 from Chelmsford.

== Media ==
Local TV coverage is provided by BBC London and ITV London, which is received from the Crystal Palace TV transmitter. BBC East and ITV Anglia can also be received from the Sudbury TV transmitter.

Local radio stations are BBC Essex on 95.3 FM, Heart East on 96.3 FM and Gateway 97.8, a community-based radio station that broadcasts from Basildon on 97.8 FM.

The town is served by the local newspaper, the Southend Echo.

== Notable people ==
- Jordan Banjo, member of dance troupe Diversity
- Chris Brooks, Capital Radio DJ, lives in Wickford
- Julian Dicks, former footballer who played for West Ham United and Liverpool, lives in Wickford
- Jon Morter, notable for the Rage Against the Machine and The Justice Collective UK Christmas number one singles, used to run a rock music night in Wickford
- Rhys Thomas and Tony Way, comedy actors and writers, are both from Wickford
- Steve Tilson, former Southend United manager
- Robert Wikeford or de Wickford (1330–1390), Archbishop of Dublin, was born in Wickford where his family are said to have been Lords of the Manor of Wickford Hall.

== See also ==
- Listed buildings in Wickford
