= The Broomway =

Public pathway in Essex, England

Coordinates: 51.54775°N 0.8422°E

The Broomway, as shown in OpenStreetMap.

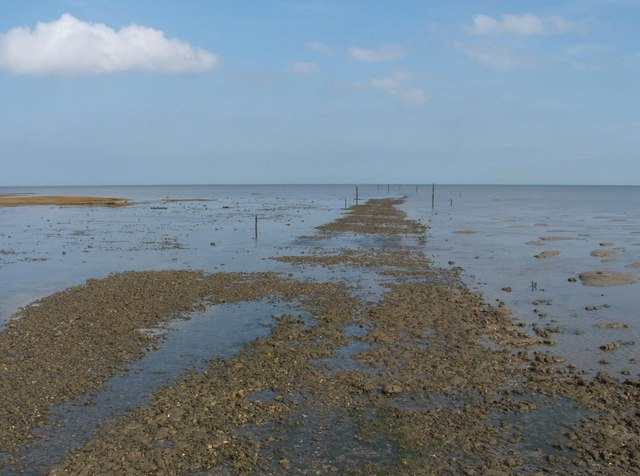
The headway at Wakering Stairs, the current southerly starting point of the Broomway

The Broomway, also formerly called the Broom Road, is a public right of way over the foreshore at the Maplin Sands off the coast of Essex, England. Most of the route is classed as a byway open to all traffic, with a shorter section of bridleway. When the tide is out, it provides access to Foulness Island, and was the only access to Foulness on foot, and the only access at low tide, until a road bridge was built over Havengore Creek in 1922.

At over 600 years old, recorded as early as 1419, the Broomway runs for 6 miles (9.7 km) along the Maplin Sands, approximately 440 yards (400 m) from the present shoreline. It was named for the "brooms", bundles of twigs attached to short poles, with which the route was once marked. A number of headways or hards ran from the track to the shore, giving access to local farms.

The Broomway is extremely dangerous in misty weather, as the incoming tide floods across the sands at high speed and the water forms whirlpools from flows of the River Crouch and River Roach. Under such conditions, the direction of the shore cannot be determined. After the road bridge was opened in 1922, the track ceased to be used, except by the armed forces.

== History ==
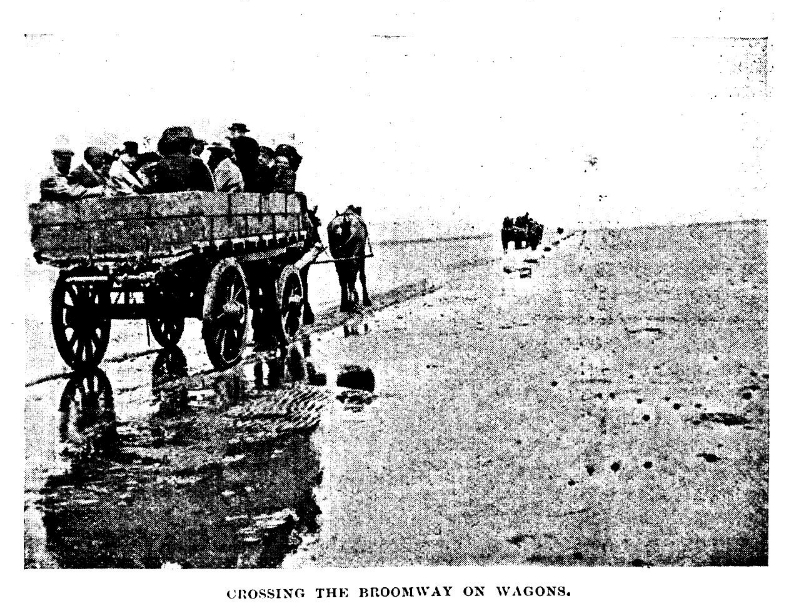
A pre-1922 trip by the Essex Field Club across The Broomway by farm wagon

There is some disagreement over whether the main route is natural, simply following a ridge of firmer sand, or originated partly or wholly as a human-made track. Traces of Roman settlement on Foulness have been taken as evidence of a Roman origin, and it has been suggested that the track and its feeders were originally a road serving an agricultural area that was subsequently flooded. It has also been surmised to be an Anglo-Saxon era drove route, again subsequently inundated due to coastal erosion or 14th century storm surges but maintained using local knowledge and temporary waymarks. An archaeological survey toward the southern end of the Broomway revealed that it had, at least on that section, been reinforced with wooden hurdle work at some point.

Noted in 1419, the route was mentioned in the following century by William Harrison in the Chronicles of Holinshed, who said that a man could ride to Foulness "if he be skilful of the causie [causeway]". The Broomway was shown in some detail, along a route very similar to the present-day one, by the surveyor John Norden in a 1595 map.

During the 18th century, various efforts were made to improve the track, which was the main route from the island for farmers taking produce to market. In 1769, a guidebook stated that "the passage into [Foulness] is at low water, and on horseback, insomuch that many, either in negligence, or being in liquor, have been overtaken by the tide and drowned". In the mid-19th century, subscriptions were raised to reinstate Wakering Stairs, which provided a better southern point of access.

The Broomway was formerly marked by a series of markers resembling short-handled besoms or brooms, hence its name. The "brooms" were driven 2 ft (0.6 m) into the sands, protruded about a foot above them, were positioned around 30 yards apart, and were stayed with wire shrouds. The author Herbert W. Tompkins, who walked the Broomway in the early 1900s, described how as the tide ebbed the brooms would "lift their heads and appear as a line of black dots", providing an indication of when the traveller might start their journey. The "brooms" required regular maintenance and replacement due to the effects of tides and storms: since at least the 18th century, this had been funded by a regular payment split between the parish and the island's major landowner. The headways, at least in later years, were marked with fingerposts of the type then found on conventional roads, also driven into the sand. At night, when the "brooms" could be harder to spot, locals were accustomed to using the lights of the Nore, Mouse, and Swin lightvessels and the Maplin lighthouse to help judge their position.

The Broomway remained a vital link to the island until the 20th century. Writing in 1901, the Essex author Reginald A. Beckett described "one of the most curious sights [he] ever beheld" as "when reaching the Stairs just before dark, there appeared a procession of market-carts coming from Foulness and rapidly driven across the sands, through water about a foot deep, with two or three fishing-smacks beyond and a distant steamer on the horizon".

== Notoriety ==
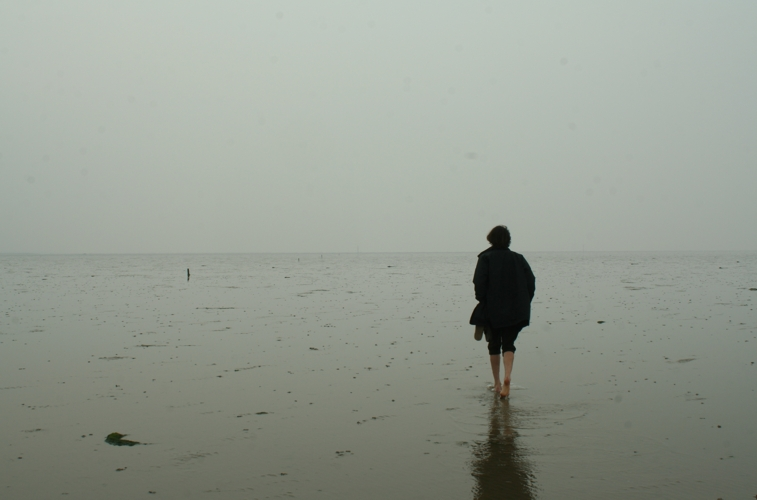
A walker on The Broomway

Often compared to the similarly dangerous path across Morecambe Bay, the Broomway has long been notorious as "the most perilous byway in England". It has earned this reputation by virtue of the disorientating nature of its environment in poor visibility, and near inevitability of death by drowning for anyone still out on the sands when the tide comes in. Many people have died on it over the years. Writing in 1867, the Rochford historian Philip Benton described the risks for those without a guide, and said that others succumbed to the "pleasurable excitement" of the dangers: "some farmers would stay [on the mainland] to the last, and then race the tide, and swim the creeks. Some of those who have been used to the sands all their lives have there yielded up their breath, and many hair-breadth escapes are recorded". Benton recorded the deaths of, amongst others, Thomas Jackson, a Rochford apothecary, in 1711; Thomas Miller, a surgeon, thrown from his horse in 1805; William Harvey, a shepherd who was thought to have drowned in 1857 after being led astray by a navigation light; and Mr. Gardner of Havengore, who became lost at night while returning along his own headway. Benton had himself become lost on the sands in fog while shooting, and only escaped with "timely assistance". In addition to the tide, fog and the risk of being swept away crossing the creeks, there were many "holes" in the mud away from the main path, particularly near the creeks, in which unwary travellers might become trapped.

Despite it being used daily by the district's postmen, even experienced locals remained at risk on the Broomway: in March 1917, one of the "leading farmer[s] on the island" was drowned one evening returning along the Broomway from Rochford Market. The Foulness Burial Register records 66 bodies recovered from the sands since 1600, with perhaps over 100 people having been drowned in total. The area Public Right of Way Officer's advice is that the Broomway should only be walked with a local guide.

In 2026, an Amazon delivery van became stranded on the Broomway after following automated GPS navigation instructions towards Foulness island.

== Navigation and access ==
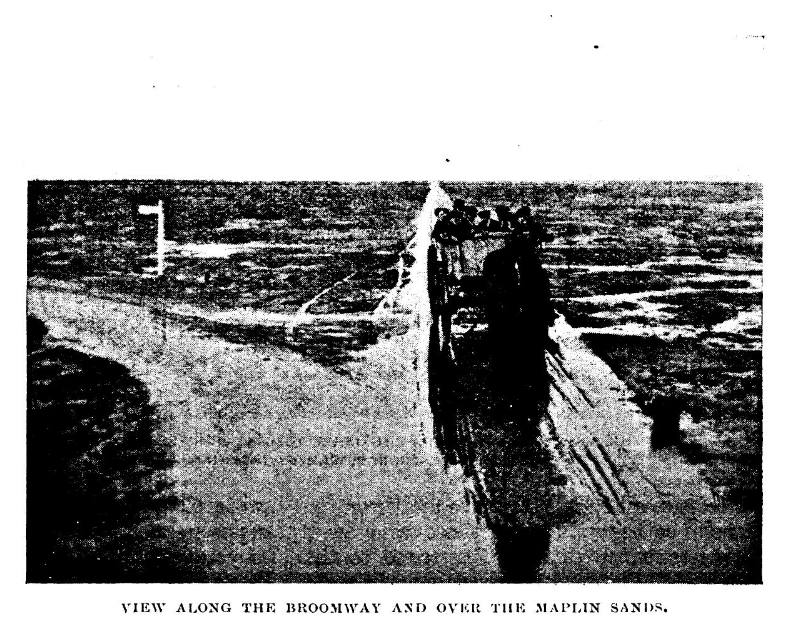
A view along the Broomway during a pre-1922 trip by the Essex Field Club, showing a fingerpost at a "headway" and one of the 400 "brooms" visible to the right of the carriage.

The Broomway leaves the mainland at Wakering Stairs, where there is a causeway over the band of soft mud (known as the Black Grounds or blackgrounds) which separates the mainland from the firmer ground of the Maplin Sands. Once upon the Maplin Sands, the Broomway heads approximately 60 degrees (magnetic) toward a navigation beacon known as "the Maypole". This beacon marks the entrance to Havengore Creek. Beyond this point, travellers once had to also wade across the mouths of New England Creek and then Shelford Creek, until both were dammed in the 1920s. From the Maypole, the road takes a more northerly route of approximately 50 degrees (magnetic) to the causeway leading to Asplins Head, the first of the surviving highways onto Foulness Island. From Wakering Stairs to Asplins Head is a walk of about one hour.

Since the opening of the bridge to the island, and the loss of the "brooms", the Broomway is now largely unmarked. There is no actual track, and for the majority of its 6 miles (9.7 km) route the Broomway is nothing more than a compass bearing over Maplin Sands.

The "headways", or access points leading from the Broomway to farms on the shoreline, were mostly constructed of Kentish ragstone or gravel. Although a number are still marked on maps, the majority are currently impassable. From south to north, the main headways are or were:

- Suttons Head or Kennets Head, near Shoeburyness East Beach, which fell into disuse in 1867 after the reopening of Wakering Stairs
- King's Head, near Pig's Bay, also lost
- Wakering Stairs, the current access point
- Havengore Island; three former headways including Havengore Head and Sharpsness Head
- New England Island, now lost
- Shelford Head, now lost
- New Burwood Head, now lost
- Asplins Head
- Rugwood Head, now impassable
- Eastwick or Pattisons Head
- Fisherman's Head, still periodically used by the MOD: its concreted surface remains the only way of getting heavy loads onto the island

From Rugwood Head to Fisherman's Head, the Broomway is technically classed as a bridleway rather than a byway.

== See also ==
- Lindisfarne, access to which is cut off by high tide and similarly dangerous
- Passage du Gois, a similar road in France
- Cross Bay Walk, a sandy path across Morecambe Bay
