= Rochford Rural District =

Former rural district in Essex, England

Coordinates: 51.58°N 0.70°E

Rochford
- Rural district
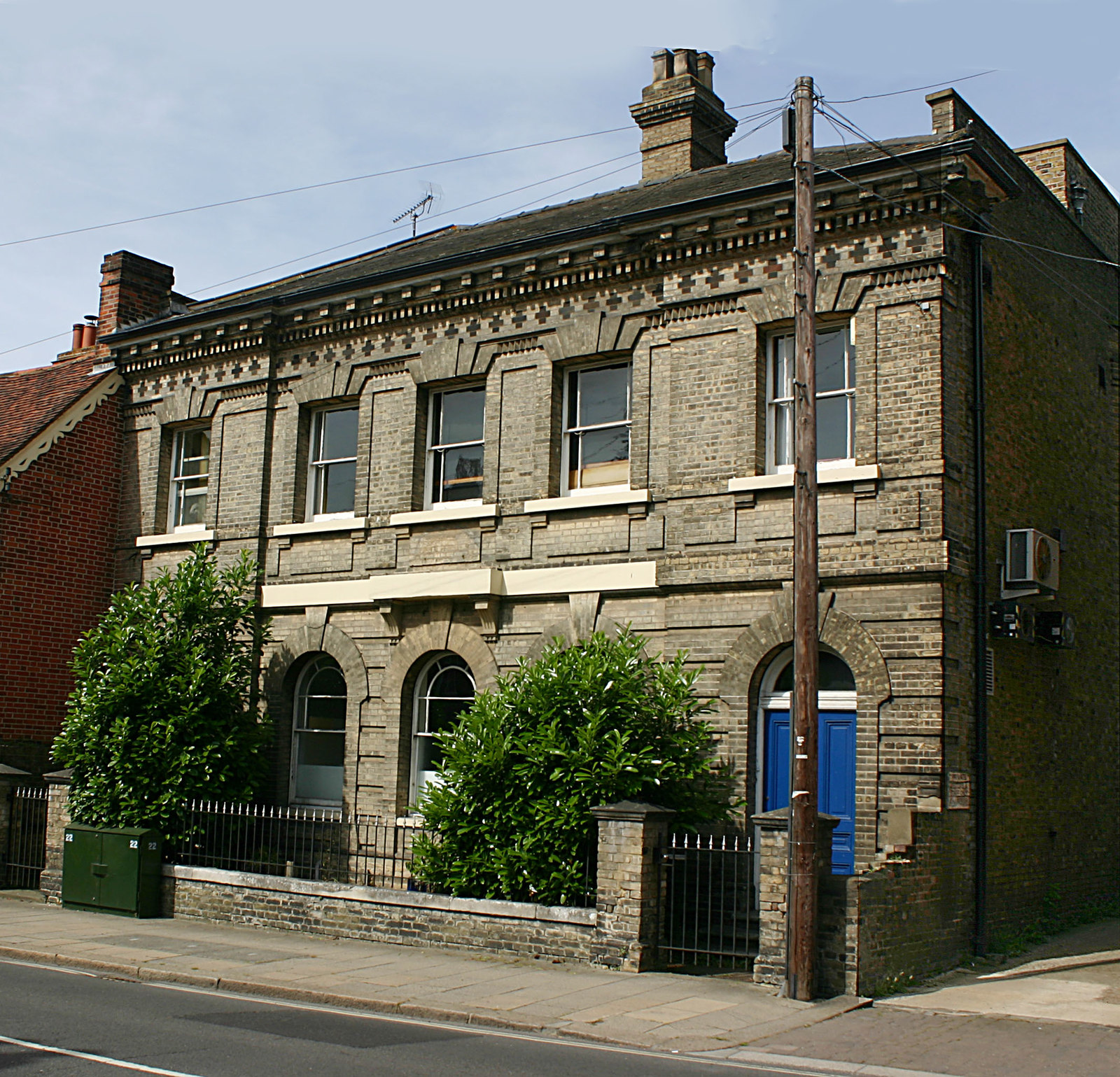
- Old Courthouse, South Street, Rochford: Council's offices in mid-20th century
- Area
  - 1911: 22,414 hectares (55,386 acres)
  - 1971: 14,609 hectares (36,100 acres)
- Population
  - 1901: 14,565
  - 1971: 42,170
- History
  - Created: 28 December 1894
  - Abolished: 31 March 1974
  - Succeeded by: Rochford District
- Status: Rural district
  - HQ: Rochford

Rochford Rural District was a rural district in Essex, England, from 1894 to 1974, covering Rochford and surrounding parishes. It was abolished in 1974 to become part of the new Rochford District.

== History ==
The district had its origins in the Rochford Poor Law Union, which had been created in 1835 for a group of parishes to collectively deliver their responsibilities under the poor laws. A workhouse to serve the union was built in 1837 on a site to the north of West Street in Rochford.

In 1872, sanitary districts were established. In rural areas, public health and local government responsibilities were given to the existing boards of guardians of poor law unions. The Rochford Rural Sanitary District therefore covered the poor law union with the exception of Southend-on-Sea. Southend formed its own urban sanitary district, having been constituted a local government district in 1866 covering part of the parish of Prittlewell. The rural sanitary district subsequently ceded the rest of Prittlewell parish to Southend in 1877.

Rural sanitary districts were reconstituted as rural districts with their own elected councils with effect from 28 December 1894, under the Local Government Act 1894. The parish of South Shoebury was removed from the rural sanitary district to become a separate urban district to coincide with the 1894 reforms; that urban district was renamed Shoeburyness the following year.

The link with the poor law union continued in that all the rural district councillors were thereafter ex officio members of the board of guardians. Rochford Rural District Council held its first official meeting on 1 January 1895.

In 1897, the parish of Southchurch was removed from the district to become part of Southend, and Leigh-on-Sea was removed to become its own urban district (Leigh was subsequently absorbed into Southend in 1913).

In 1926 the parish of Canvey Island was removed to create the Canvey Island Urban District. In 1929 the parishes of Hadleigh, South Benfleet and Thundersley were removed to create the Benfleet Urban District, and at the same time the parishes of Rayleigh and Rawreth were removed to create the Rayleigh Urban District. North Shoebury and Eastwood were absorbed into Southend in 1933.

In the early years, the council met at the boardroom at the workhouse, and its staff were based at various offices both in the district and in nearby towns. The old workhouse later became Rochford Hospital. The council subsequently took over the old courthouse (built in 1859) at 24 South Street in Rochford to serve as its headquarters after the courts relocated to Southend in the 1920s. The council continued to use the old courthouse as its offices until its abolition, but later acquired additional offices at a converted 18th century house called Roche House at 7 South Street.

The rural district was abolished in 1974. The area merged with Rayleigh Urban District to become the new non-metropolitan district of Rochford.

== Parishes ==
The district contained the following civil parishes:

- Ashingdon
- Barling Magna (Note: The civil parish was just called Barling until 1946 when it was changed to Barling Magna to match the name of the ecclesiastical parish.)
- Canewdon
- Canvey Island (until 1926)
- Eastwood (until 1946) (Note: The main part of Eastwood was absorbed into Southend in 1933, leaving a small residual detached part of the parish on Wallasea Island, which was abolished in 1946 and absorbed into Canewdon.)
- Foulness
- Great Stambridge (merged with Little Stambridge in 1934 to form Stambridge)
- Great Wakering
- Hadleigh (became part of Benfleet Urban District in 1929)
- Havengore (absorbed into Foulness in 1946)
- Hawkwell
- Hockley
- Hullbridge (created 1964 from part of Hockley)
- Leigh (became Leigh-on-Sea Urban District in 1897)
- Little Stambridge (merged with Great Stambridge in 1934 to form Stambridge)
- Little Wakering (absorbed into Barling Magna in 1946)
- North Shoebury (absorbed into Southend in 1933)
- Paglesham
- Rawreth (became part of Rayleigh Urban District in 1929)
- Rayleigh (became part of Rayleigh Urban District in 1929)
- Rochford
- Shopland (absorbed into Sutton in 1946)
- Southchurch (absorbed into Southend in 1897)
- South Benfleet (became part of Benfleet Urban District in 1929)
- South Fambridge (absorbed into Ashingdon in 1946)
- Stambridge (created 1934 from Great Stambridge and Little Stambridge)
- Sutton
- Thundersley (became part of Benfleet Urban District in 1929)
