= Swin (Thames) =

Passage in the Thames estuary

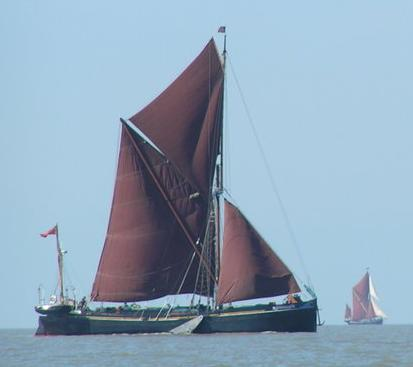
- Thames sailing barge, with typical red-brown sails, in the East Swin.

- Coordinates: 51°39′N 01°10′E
- Part of: Thames Estuary

The Swin is a passage in the Thames estuary between Maplin Sands, Foulness Sand and Gunfleet Sand northwest and the Barrow and Sunk sand ridges (shoals), southeast. The Swin was used by barges and leisure craft from the Essex rivers, and coasters and colliers from Hull, Great Grimsby, North East England, Edinburgh and other similar sets of trading ports.

In 1874 R.M. Ballantyne wrote:

The channel ... was the Swin, which, though not used by first-class ships, is perhaps the most frequented by the greater portion of the coasting and colliery vessels, and all the east country craft. The traffic is so great as to be almost continuous; innumerable vessels being seen in fine weather passing to and fro as far as the eye can reach.

The channel is formed of a series of deep water passages through sandbanks. Approaching from the northeast craft enter the East Swin between NE Gunfleet and Sunk Head Tower buoys. This part is also known as the King's Channel centred on 51°45′N 1°25′E. From here is a choice of the Middle Deep or continuing with the East Swin centred on 51°41′N 01°11′E. Craft may also pass down the parallel Wallet channel and cross into the East Swin at the Spitway. Halfway along this part, at the Maplin Approach buoy, deeper draught vessels need to pass through to the Middle Deep centred on 51°39′N 01°10′E. Shallower draught craft, such as the traditional Thames sailing barges, may continue on down the East Swin and cross the Middle Sands directly into the West Swin at Maplin Edge. Both other Swins lead to the West Swin centred on 51°33′N 01°01′E. The southeastern end of the West Swin joins the main Thames channels.

== Etymology, pronunciation and orthography ==
It is an Old English word swin: a creek a channel. It was recorded in contemporary orthography of local writers as Swyn in 1365; a related toponym 'Zwin' occurs in Dutch. It was thus not a sound liable to the Great Vowel Shift.

== Scope and soundings ==
Excerpt of a chart of 1934. Here, the more shallow (dangerous) the darker-shaded. Click for broader map and to enable varied magnification.

To explain the numbers on the inset map a depth of 1_{1} is a formula of six feet (i.e. one fathom) and 1 foot. It is 1 1/6 fathoms. This excerpt shows clearly the detailed shallows which affect vessels of greater draught such as ships most severely.
