= North Shoebury =

Village in Essex, England

Coordinates: 51.53989°N 0.78167°E

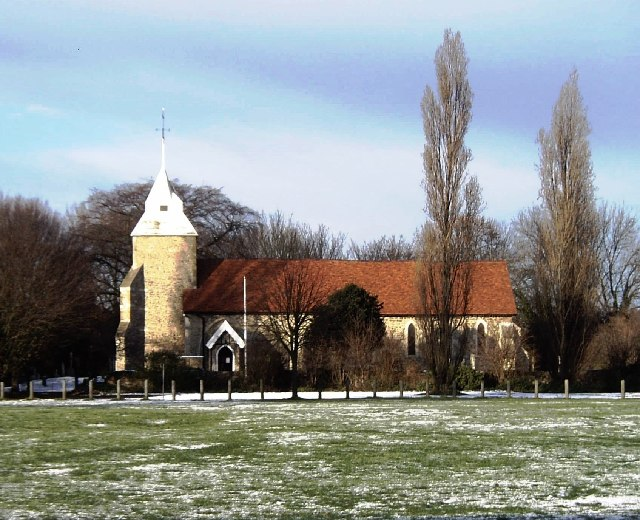
- St Mary's Church, North Shoebury

- Location within Essex
- Unitary authority: Southend-on-Sea
- Shire county: Essex
- Region: East
- Country: England
- Sovereign state: United Kingdom
- Post town: SOUTHEND-ON-SEA
- Postcode district: SS3

North Shoebury is part of Shoeburyness, a suburb of the city of Southend-on-Sea in Essex, England. North Shoebury was historically a separate village and parish. The civil parish was abolished in 1933, when the western part of the parish, including the village itself, was absorbed into Southend-on-Sea, and the eastern part of the parish was added to Great Wakering. Although abolished as a civil parish, North Shoebury remains an ecclesiastical parish. The area around the small village of North Shoebury saw extensive development during the 20th century, and it and Shoeburyness have become part of the built up area of Southend.

== History ==
The name Shoebury means "shelter fortification" or "shoe fortification".

In Saxon times, Shoebury formed a vill. By the time of the Domesday Book of 1086, the vill was divided into three estates or manors, listed as Essobiam or Sobiam within the Rochford Hundred of Essex.

No church or priest is mentioned at Shoebury in the Domesday Book. A church dedicated to St Andrew was built in the early 12th century at South Shoebury, originally as a chapel of ease to Prittlewell Priory. By 1170 there was also a church at North Shoebury, also owned by Prittlewell Priory. The earliest surviving part of the current church at North Shoebury, dedicated to St Mary the Virgin, was built around 1230. Much of the building was rebuilt in the 14th and 15th centuries, with the porch added in the 18th century. It is now a Grade II* listed building.

North Shoebury and South Shoebury became separate parishes. North Shoebury was known as Little Shoebury, or Shoebury Parva (in Latin Parva Shoberi).

In manorial terms, North Shoebury was split into two: North Shoebury Hall (also known as West Hall), and Kents (also known as Soberia).

John Marius Wilson's Imperial Gazetteer of England and Wales 1870–72 entry reads:

SHOEBURY (North), a parish in Rochford district, Essex; on the coast, 3½ miles E of Southend r. station. Post town, Southchurch, under Southend. Acres, 2,131; of which 1,045 are water. Real property, £2,518. Pop., 193. Houses, 40. The manor belongs to G. A. W. Welch, Esq. The living is a vicarage in the Diocese of Rochester. Value, £185.* Patron, the Lord Chancellor. The church is ancient but good.

When elected parish and district councils were established in 1894, North Shoebury was included in the Rochford Rural District. In 1933 the civil parish of North Shoebury was abolished. The western part of the parish, including the village, was absorbed into the County Borough of Southend. The eastern part of the parish was transferred to the neighbouring parish of Great Wakering. The neighbouring urban district of Shoeburyness, corresponding to the parish of South Shoebury, was abolished at the same time and also absorbed into Southend. At the 1931 census (the last before the abolition of the civil parish), North Shoebury had a population of 403.

North Shoebury and Shoeburyness have administratively been part of Southend since 1933. With significant urban development in the area around the old village of North Shoebury and adjoining Shoeburyness, both are now classed as part of the Southend-on-Sea built up area as defined by the Office for National Statistics. North Shoebury is described as part of Shoeburyness in the city council's local plan.

Although the civil parish of North Shoebury was abolished in 1933, it remains an ecclesiastical parish.
