= Barling, Essex =

Village in Essex, England

Coordinates: 51.5722°N 0.7849°E

Barling Magna
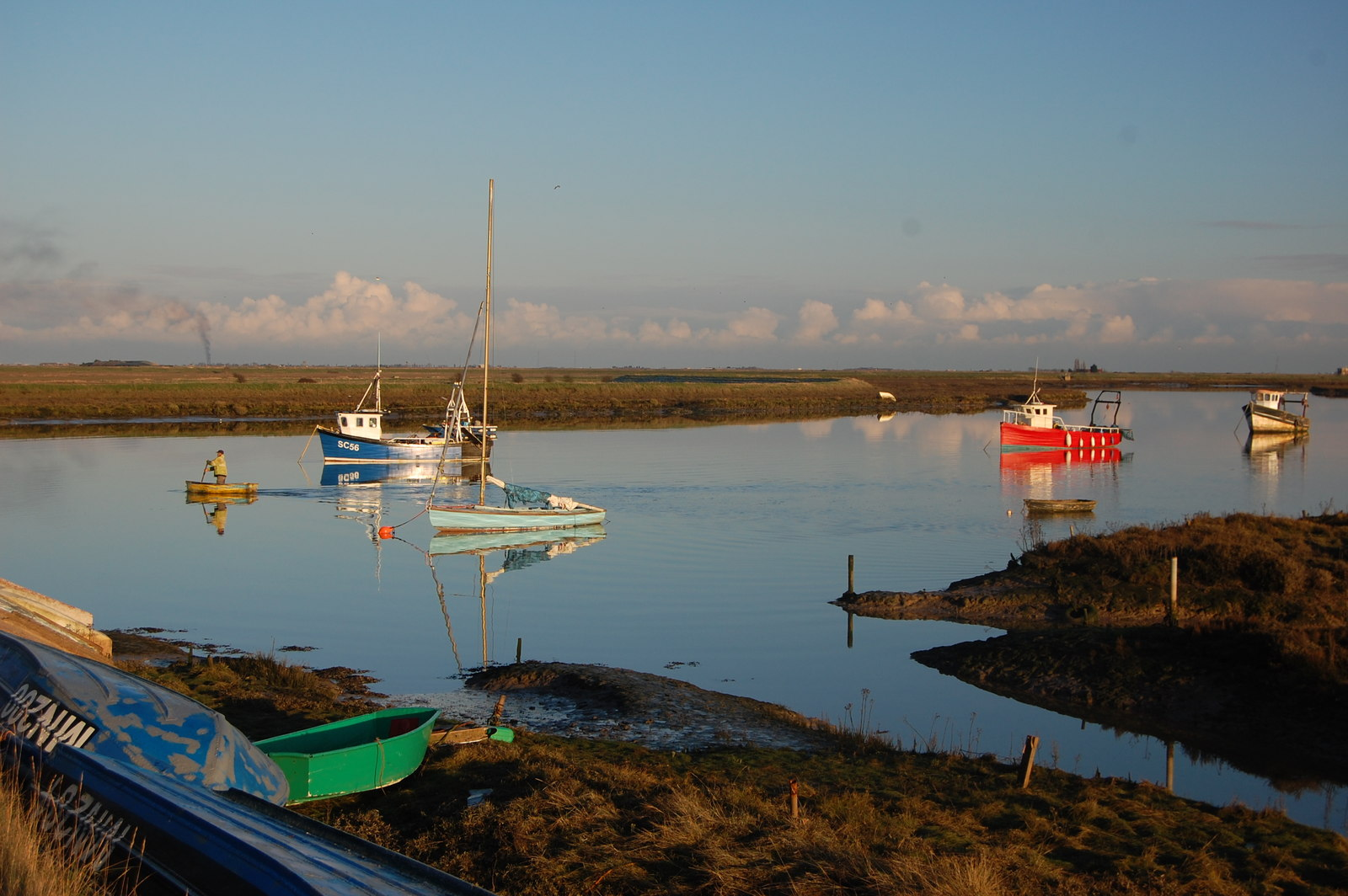
- Boats moored in the creek near Barling Hall

- Location within Essex
- Population: 1,604 (Parish, 2021)
- OS grid reference: TQ930895
- Civil parish: Barling Magna
- District: Rochford
- Shire county: Essex
- Region: East
- Country: England
- Sovereign state: United Kingdom
- Post town: SOUTHEND-ON-SEA
- Postcode district: SS3
- Dialling code: 01702
- Police: Essex
- Fire: Essex
- Ambulance: East of England
- UK Parliament: Rochford & Southend East

Barling or Barling Magna is a village and civil parish in the Rochford District of Essex, England. It lies 4 miles (6 km) north-east of Southend-on-Sea, its post town, and 17 miles (27 km) south-east of the county town of Chelmsford. "Barling Magna" is the legal name of the parish and is also used in official postal addresses both in the village itself and its hinterland. "Barling" is used on modern Ordnance Survey maps to label the village. As well as the village itself, the parish also includes surrounding rural areas, including the village of Little Wakering, Stonebridge and Little Barling. The northern boundary of the parish is the tidal River Roach, and at its eastern end the parish includes Potton Island. At the 2021 census the parish had a population of 1,604.

== Toponymy ==
The name Barling is Old English and means the place of the people of someone called Baerla.

On Ordnance Survey maps the village is labelled simply as Barling. In official postal addresses, the Royal Mail uses the name Barling Magna.

The parish was historically known under both versions of the name. The name Barling Magna (meaning "Great Barling") was recorded from at least the Valor Ecclesiasticus of 1535. The "Magna" suggests there may have been another Barling to distinguish this one from. Some sources maintain that despite the name implying the existence of another Barling, there was no "Little Barling" or "Barling Parva".

Others have theorised that there may have been a long-lost settlement of Little Barling, possibly with a church, in the north-west of the modern parish. In the Domesday Book of 1086 there were two manors at Barling. The smaller manor had its manor house at Mucking Hall. There is evidence of the stone foundations of a long-demolished building in a field to the north-east of Bolts Farm, which lies a short distance from Mucking Hall. These have been claimed by some to be the remains of Little Barling church, but this has not been confirmed, and Essex Record Office has no records for there being a church or parish of Little Barling.

The name Barling Magna came to be usually used for the parish in ecclesiastical contexts, whilst the shorter form Barling came to be usually used in civil contexts. As part of boundary changes in 1946 the civil parish was renamed Barling Magna to match the ecclesiastical form of the name.

== History ==
Barling appears in the Domesday Book of 1086 as Berlinga in the Rochford Hundred of Essex. It was split between two estates or manors at that time.

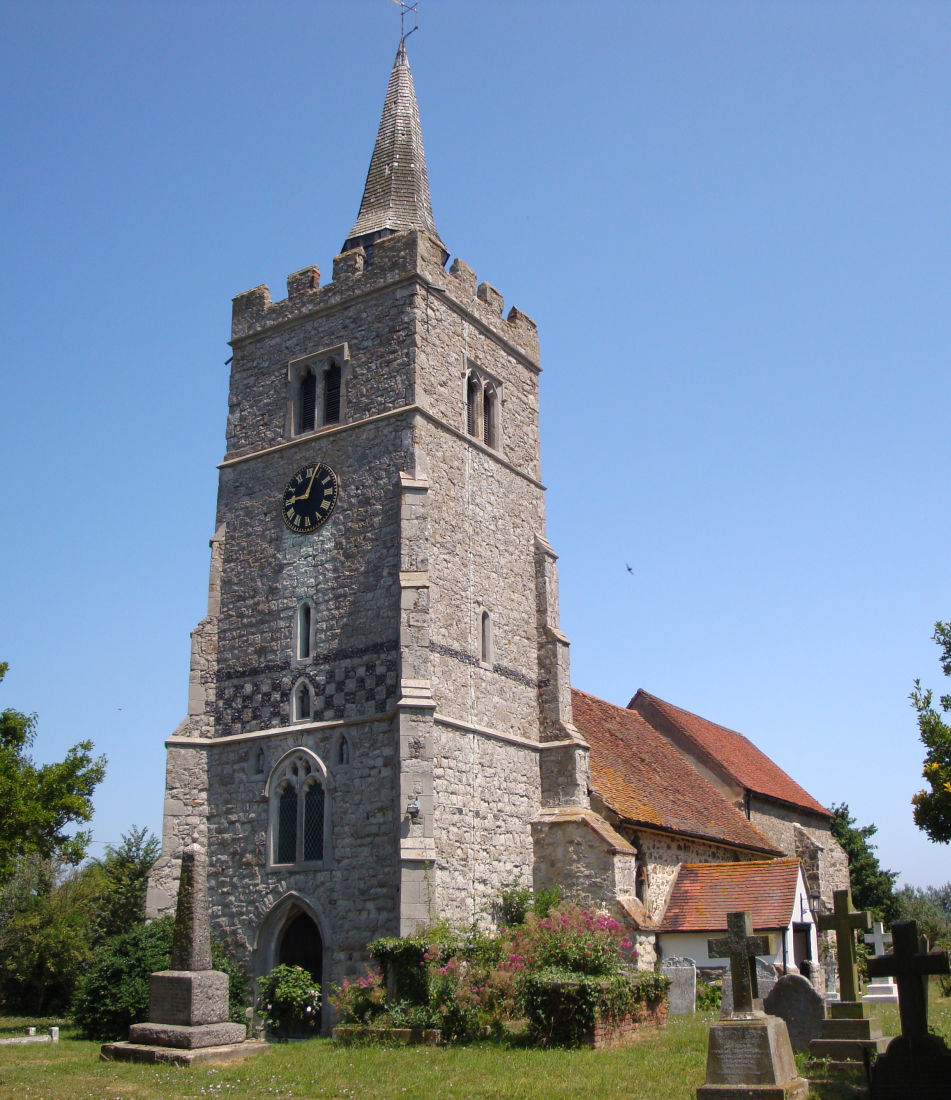
All Saints' Church

No church or priest was mentioned at Barling in the Domesday Book, but it came to be a parish. Barling's parish church, dedicated to All Saints, dates back to the 12th century.

In 1946 the civil parish was enlarged to take in the area of the neighbouring parish of Little Wakering, which was abolished, and two detached parcels of the parish of Great Wakering. As part of the 1946 boundary changes the civil parish was renamed Barling Magna to match the version of the name which had long been used for the parish in ecclesiastical contexts. At the 1931 census (the last before the rename and the Little Wakering merger), Barling had a population of 380.

== Geography ==
The village is served by one primary school, Barling Magna Primary Academy.

Barling is by Barlinghall Creek, a tributary of the River Roach. In its agricultural setting, Barling village is mainly situated along Little Wakering Road, Church Road and Barling Road. Where these roads meet is the village duck pond.

The parish also includes rural areas, including the hamlet of Stonebridge in the south-western corner of the parish and a number of farms. To the east the parish includes within its boundaries Potton Island, which is connected to the mainland by a bridge over Potton Creek. Mucking Hall is in the north-west corner of the parish close to the River Roach; it was the manor house for one of Barling's two manors mentioned in Domesday Book. The current house dates from at least the 16th century and stands within a moat.

Little Wakering lies immediately south of Barling village. Little Wakering village is now contiguous with both Barling to the north and Great Wakering to the south. The Office for National Statistics identifies Little Wakering and Barling as both forming part of the Great Wakering built up area.

== Governance ==
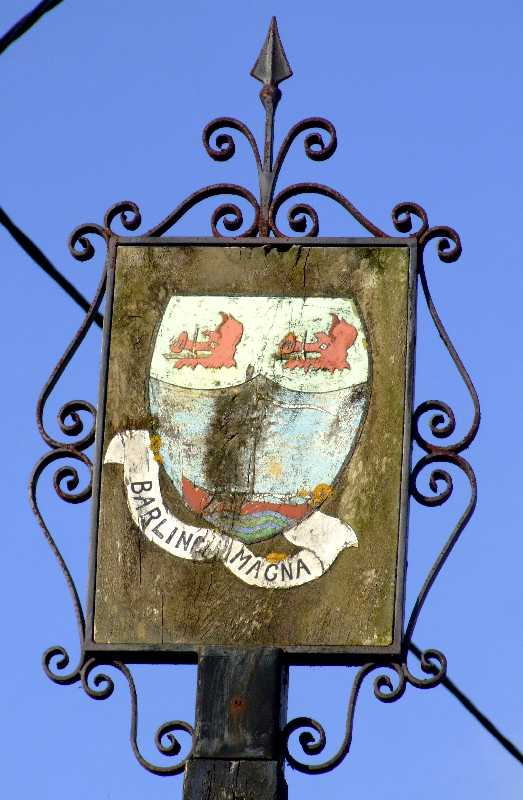
Village sign

There are three tiers of local government covering Barling Magna, at parish, district, and county level: Barling Magna Parish Council, Rochford District Council, and Essex County Council. The parish council meets at the Village Hall at 423 Little Wakering Road in Barling.

For national elections, the parish forms part of the Southend East and Rochford constituency.
