= Little Wakering =

Village in Essex, England

Coordinates: 51.5606°N 0.7889°E

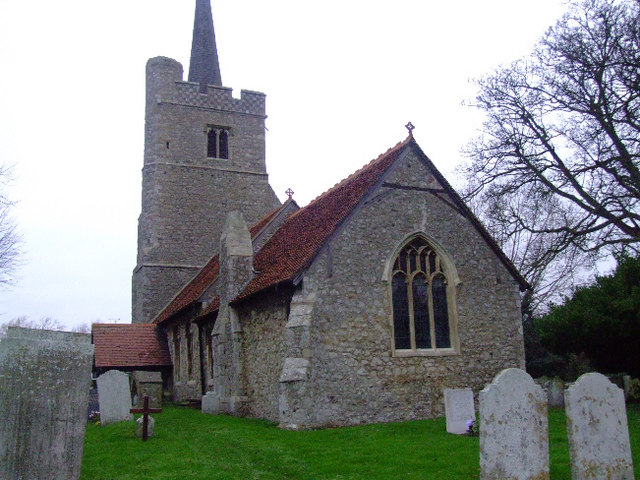
- St Mary's Church

- Location within Essex
- Civil parish: Barling Magna
- District: Rochford
- Shire county: Essex
- Region: East
- Country: England
- Sovereign state: United Kingdom
- Police: Essex
- Fire: Essex
- Ambulance: East of England

Little Wakering is a village in the civil parish of Barling Magna, in the Rochford district, in the county of Essex, England. It is about 4 miles from Southend-on-Sea. It has an Anglican church called St Mary's Church which is a Grade II* listed building.

== Geography ==
Little Wakering lies immediately south of Barling village. Little Wakering village is now contiguous with both Barling to the north and Great Wakering to the south. The Office for National Statistics identifies Little Wakering and Barling as both forming part of the Great Wakering built up area.

== Notable buildings ==
St Mary's Church at Little Wakering is a listed building and dates back to the 12th century. Its tower was added around 1425 by John Wakering, who was Bishop of Norwich from 1416 to 1425. The tower was partially funded by Anne, Countess of Stafford, and was built to commemorate John Wakering's safe return from the Battle of Agincourt in 1415.

Opposite St Mary's Church is a house called Brays, dated 1634. The rest of the village is modern. To the east of the village stands Little Wakering Hall, parts of which date back to at least the 15th century.

== History ==
The name "Wakering" means 'Waecer's/Wacor's people' or 'watching place'. Little Wakering was recorded in the Domesday Book as Wachelinga. Little Wakering was in Rochford hundred. In 1894 Little Wakering became part of Rochford Rural District, on 1 April 1946 the parish was abolished to form Barling Magna, parts also went to Foulness, Canewdon and Great Wakering. At the 1931 census (the last before the abolition of the parish), Little Wakering had a population of 420. In 1974 Little Wakering became part of Rochford non-metropolitan district in the non-metropolitan county of Essex.
