= Potton Island =

Island in Essex, England

Coordinates: 51°35′N 0°49′E

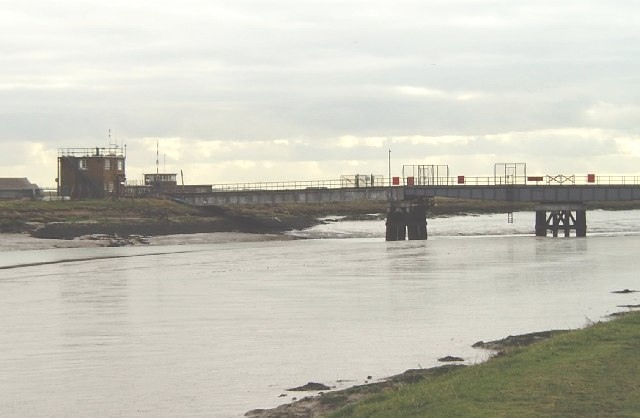
Potton Island swing bridge

Potton Island is a sparsely populated island west of Foulness in Essex, England. It is connected to the mainland by a swing bridge with a traffic light system, and the road leads to Great Wakering.

== Geography ==
Potton Island is bounded by the River Roach on its northern side. It is separated from Foulness Island by The Middleway which forms its eastern edge, and splits into two to pass either side of Rushley Island. Its western edge is defined by The Violet, which flows southwards from the Roach near Pagglesham Reach. This becomes Potton Creek, which continues along the western side to join The Middleway at the island's southern tip. There is a ford at the northern end of Potton Creek, and the swing bridge near the southern end. Because the creeks become little more than muddy ditches at low tide, the bridge is opened on request during a window of two hours either side of high tide. Such requests can be made for every high tide, whether during the day or the night.

== History ==
Unlike some of the other nearby islands which were formerly marshland, Potton Island has been inhabited at least since the Neolithic era. It was home to several arable farms until it flooded in 1884, leading to its temporary abandonment and longer-term use as pasture. The island was reclaimed in the 1940s by Harold Philpott, who grew crops and kept livestock on it. This included 350 cattle, 200 sheep and some 1000 pigs. During the Second World War, Potton had its own Home Guard, and around 250 bombs were dropped on it. Eleven people were trapped on the island during the East Coast Flood of 1953, but all were safely rescued. The Ministry of Defence acquired the island in 1955, although they leased around 80 per cent of it back to farmers, who used it for pasture.

There were only three houses on the island, which were inhabited by three families. Rene and John Ford lived there from 1960 to 1991. She cared for sheep, pigs and dairy cows, as well as assisting with cultivation of wheat and vegetables. Her son Graham was still living on the island in 2018, when the farm provided secure stabling for up to 60 horses. Residents could not access the north end of the island at that date.

In June 2005, it was disclosed that Potton Island was considered by John Major's Conservative government in the 1980s or 1990s as a potential long-term storage site for high-level nuclear waste. Local government (Rochford District Council) subsequently expressed their surprise and concern that they had not been party to any consultation on the matter. Also in 2005, the MP for Leyton and Wanstead Harry Cohen described Potton as a former defence base, and asked a parliamentary question about whether it could be released for non-military purposes. The Parliamentary Under-Secretary of State Don Touhig replied that the island was part of a buffer zone for the testing of weapons at Shoeburyness Ranges, but that a significant part of it was leased for farming. At the time a land quality assessment was being undertaken for all of the local Ministry of Defence land, and Potton's future would be considered once that was completed.

Potton, Rushley and Foulness islands have been used by the Ministry of Defence for testing of weapons and undisclosed activities in the national interest. In 2024, they announced that Potton and Rushley were no longer needed for these purposes, and would be sold. They had previously been offered for sale around ten years earlier, but were not sold on that occasion.
