= Peter Sampson =

English footballer

Personal information
- Full name: Peter Stanley Sampson
- Date of birth: 9 July 1927
- Place of birth: Great Wakering, England
- Date of death: 16 May 2009 (aged 81)
- Place of death: Congresbury, England
- Position: Right half

Youth career
- Oldland

Senior career*
Years	Team	Apps	(Gls)
1948–1961	Bristol Rovers	340	(4)
1961–1963	Trowbridge Town		
- * Club domestic league appearances and goals

Peter Stanley Sampson (9 July 1927 – 16 May 2009) was a professional footballer, who spent his entire Football League career with Bristol Rovers, and who also went on to play for Trowbridge Town after retiring from the professional game.

Sampson was born in Great Wakering, in Essex, and attended Great Wakering School, for whom he once scored 72 goals in a single season. He initially trained as a butcher, before being called up to the army and stationed in West Africa during World War II. He bought himself out of the army for £65, and returned to England to sign as an amateur for Bristol Rovers. He turned professional with the club in 1948, and had a thirteen-year-long career with them, making 340 league appearances and scoring four goals during that spell. He moved to Trowbridge Town in 1961, where he stayed for two years before taking over as assistant manager of his former youth club, Oldland.

Away from football, Sampson had run a poultry business with his Bristol Rovers teammate Vic Lambden while playing in Bristol, and after his retirement from the sport he worked as a gardener and a milkman in his adopted home town of Cadbury Heath.

Towards the end of his life he was diagnosed with Alzheimer's disease, and spent his last few years living at a nursing home in Congresbury near Bristol. He died on 16 May 2009, aged 81.

He was the cousin of former Chelsea player Les Stubbs.
