= Saint Mary the Virgin, Foulness Island =

Church in Foulness, Essex, England

Coordinates: 51.602°N 0.8922°E

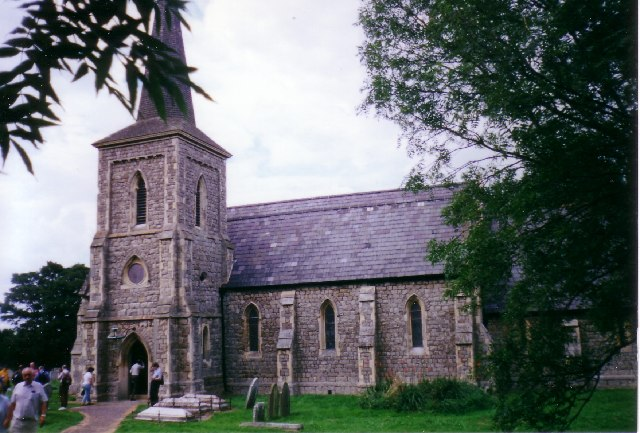
Foulness Parish Church of St Mary the Virgin, now redundant

Saint Mary the Virgin is a parish of the Church of England on Foulness Island, in Essex, England.

Before the 15th century, the island of Foulness was divided among several neighbouring parishes. The inhabitants were expected to attend church services in their respective mainland parish churches but in practice this must have been difficult and at times impossible, as in those days there was no bridge linking Foulness to the mainland.

In 1407, Lady Joan de Bohun, Countess of Essex, obtained a licence from the Bishop of London to found a chantry of a chaplain to celebrate Mass on a daily basis in a chapel on Foulness. She also managed to secure the payment of church dues towards the upkeep of the chapel, rather than having the islanders’ payments going towards the various mainland parishes among which the island had been split.

Some 150 years later, the Chantry was dissolved under the massive religious upheaval resulting from Henry VIII's Dissolution of the Monasteries. The chapel's land and possessions were confiscated. However, the desire for local services remained and within three years Foulness became a separate ecclesiastical parish.

The old chantry chapel was demolished and a new timber-framed church was erected on the site, this church being dedicated to St Mary the Virgin. By the middle the 19th century this old church was in a poor state of repair and the size of the population of the parish had outgrown the small building. In 1848 the parishioners decided to pull the old church down and build a new one in its place.

The present church, which is now Grade II listed, was erected a little to the west of the original site. The parishioners themselves provided some forty per cent of the cost of building, and George Finch, the then Lord of the manor, twenty per cent. The rest came from two ecclesiastical building societies and from private subscription, including £50 from the Elder Brethren of Trinity House so that the spire might be built of a sufficient height to be of value as a seamark for sailors.

The church was built in the Early English style, to a design by William Hambley, with a spire, a nave with two aisles, and a chancel. The churchyard was expanded, using ground given by George Finch. The new church was consecrated in 1853 and dedicated to "Saint Mary the Virgin, Saint Thomas and All Saints".

The church is quite plain inside, with almost no stained glass. The organ was built in 1866 and gained “a gold medal at an exhibition” but the brass plaque attached to it does not tell us which exhibition; it was purchased from North Ockendon and dedicated in 1908. A swell was added to commemorate the Silver Jubilee of George VI and was dedicated in October 1936.

Although no obvious evidence remains of the earlier church buildings, there are several gravestones which clearly predate the present building, including one for Jonas Allen who died on 27 April 1698, which carries a skull and crossbones motif. There are also three War Graves from the First World War containing the remains of unidentified Royal Navy sailors whose bodies were found on the coast of the island.

Inside the main gate of the churchyard is the island's War Memorial. On one face are listed the names of seven Islanders who gave their lives in the “Great War”, and on an adjoining face the names of the three who died in the Second World War.

The church was permanently closed in May 2010, and the building was later put up for sale. In 2019 there were plans for it to become a five-bedroom home.
