= Havengore Island =

Island in Essex, England

Coordinates: 51°34′N 0°51′E

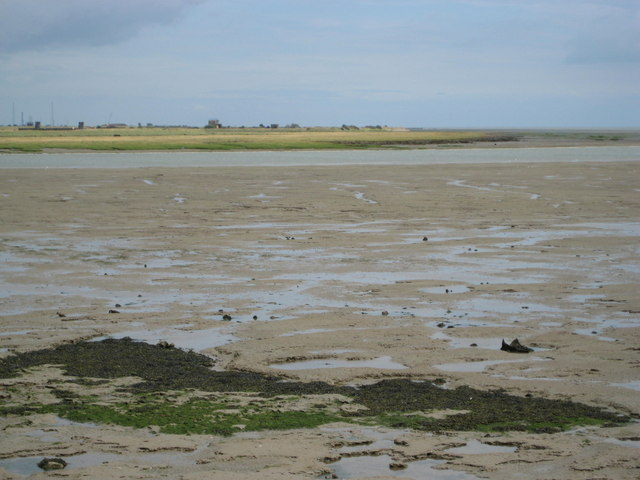
The south-east corner of Havengore Island viewed looking across Havengore Creek from the public footpath near Haven Point

Havengore Island is a low-lying, marshy island in the civil parish of Foulness, in the Rochford district of the county of Essex, England. It is bounded by New England Creek to the north, Havengore Creek to the south west, the Middleway to the north west, with the North Sea to the south and east. Access to the island is restricted by the Ministry of Defence.

An Ordnance Survey map of 1880 shows a private ferry across Havengore Creek, linking the island to the mainland near to where Havengore Bridge now stands. Two farms are also shown. The War Office acquired the island in 1902 and later authorised the construction of a Scherzer rolling lift bridge across the Creek, which was completed in 1919. Two petitions urging the Ministry of Defence (MOD) to replace the bridge owing to its poor condition were presented in the House of Commons by Rochford MP Dr Michael Clark on 21 February 1986. The MOD obliged and the current Havengore Bridge was opened in 1988. The bridge roadway can be lifted to allow the passage of marine traffic using the Creek to reach the River Roach from the North Sea and vice versa. The bridge is operated by defence contractor, QinetiQ as part of MOD Shoeburyness. Another bridge spans New England Creek to New England Island, from which the road continues to Foulness. The island's south east coast and south west shore is protected by dykes.

The island has never been heavily populated and now has a few buildings along its single road. Its southern end is Ministry of Defence land.

HMS Beagle is said to have been used to block one of the channels around the island in its last days.

== Administrative history ==
Historically, the eastern and western parts of the island, covering 385 acres (156 hectares) in total, formed part of Little Wakering parish. The remaining 300 acres (121 hectares) in the centre of the island formed an extra-parochial area, a sixth of which was salt marsh.

Extra-parochial areas were converted into civil parishes in 1858, and so the part of Havengore Island which had not been in any parish became a civil parish called Havengore. On 1 April 1946 the parish was abolished and its area became part of Foulness parish, as did the parts of the island in Little Wakering parish. The national census of 1931 (the last carried out before the parish was dissolved), showed Havengore parish had a population of 12.
