= River Roach =

River in Essex, England

Roach
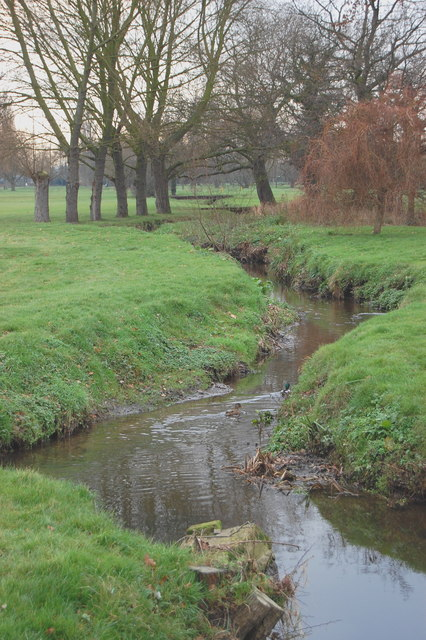
- River Roach flowing through Rochford Hundred Golf Course

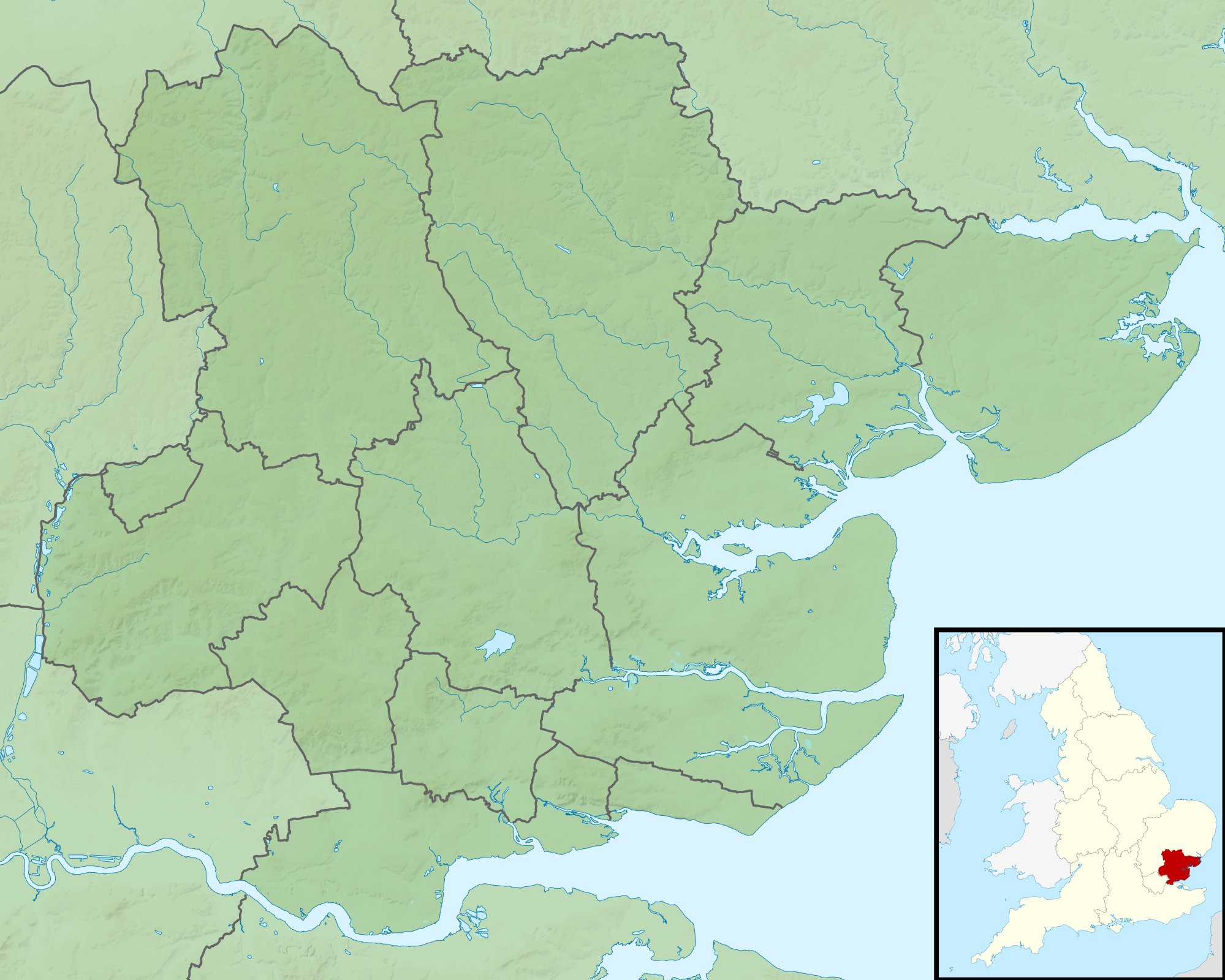
- Location of the river mouth within Essex

Location
- Country: England
- County: Essex

Physical characteristics
- Source
  - location: Rayleigh
  - coordinates: 51.5973°N 0.6322°E
  - elevation: 58 m (190 ft)
- Mouth: River Crouch
  - location: east of Wallasea Island
  - coordinates: 51.6166°N 0.8718°E
  - elevation: 0 m (0 ft)
- Length: 22 km (14 mi)

Basin features
- River system: River Crouch
- Designation

Ramsar Wetland
- Official name: Crouch & Roach Estuaries
- Designated: 24 March 1995
- Reference no.: 721

The River Roach is a river that flows entirely through the English county of Essex. It is one of four main streams that originate in the Rayleigh Hills to the west, and flow east. They then flow towards the centre of the Rochford Basin, a circular feature which may have been caused by an asteroid impact in the Late Oligocene or Early Miocene periods. To the east of Rochford, the river becomes tidal, and is governed by the Crouch Harbour Authority. It joins the River Crouch between Wallasea Island and Foulness Island. To the west of Rochford, there is some doubt as to which of the four streams is officially the Roach.

At Stambridge, there was a tidal mill from at least the 1500s, although few details are known until it was rebuilt in 1809. A pound was filled by the incoming tide, and was released to drive a water wheel as the tide fell. On spring tides, this gave around 7 hours of operation, which gradually decreased as the tides reduced, and at neap tides, the operation of the mill was entirely dependent on the flow from the upper river. Rankins, the millers, objected to plans by the Great Eastern Railway to build a dam and reservoirs in Rochford, as it would damage their operation, but a single reservoir was authorised in 1904.

The river channels are designated as "heavily modified" from their natural state by the Environment Agency, who measure the water quality. This is moderate for most of the tributaries, and the chemical status has improved since 2013. Charles Darwin's HMS Beagle was moored on the river from 1850 as a Coast Guard watch ship. It was sold for breaking, but an archaeological survey concluded in 2008 that much of it still remains buried beneath the mud near Paglesham. The Paglesham Reach is also significant for its native oysters.

== Geology ==
The River Roach flows across the Rochford Basin, a nearly circular topographical basin, with Rochford near its centre. To the south is the River Thames, and to the north, the River Crouch, but the basin is surrounded on three sides by the low hills of Canewdon, Ashingdon, Hockley, Eastwood, Westcliff-on-Sea, Prittlewell and Southend-on-Sea. These continue in a westerly and south-westerly direction to become the Rayleigh Hills, in Rayleigh and Thundersley. The basin is approximately 3.7 to 4.3 miles (6.0 to 6.9 km) in diameter, and its base consists of London Clay covered by a layer of sands, gravels, and river brick-earths, dating from the Upper Pleistocene period. The hills also consist of London Clay in their lower levels, but are covered by Claygate Beds, between 56 and 75 feet (17 and 23 m) thick, and where they are highest, by Bagshot Beds.

Four main streams drain from the Rayleigh Hills, and flow in a generally easterly direction until they reach the Rochford Basin. The southernmost is the Prittle Brook. Next comes the Eastwood Brook, and then the Noblesgreen Ditch. The fourth stream originates in Hockley Woods, and is joined by a fifth in Hawkwell, on the edge of the Rochford Basin. Once they enter the basin, they all flow towards its centre, and join up near Rochford. The way in which they are all roughly parallel until they reach the basin, and then change direction, together with the presence of a small chalk inlier near Stambridge Mill, when the chalk layer throughout the area is between 360 and 520 feet (110 and 160 m) below sea level, has led Stratford to suggest that the Rochford Basin may be the result of an impact by an asteroid in the Late Oligocene or Early Miocene periods.

== Names ==
Rochford takes its name from Rochefort, Old English for "Ford of the Hunting Dogs". The River Roach was originally called the "Walfleet" or "Walflete" (Creek of the foreigners). It is believed that it was renamed the Roach in what is known as a back formation. This is where it is assumed that Rochford means ford over the River Roach, so they could have renamed the river to fit the theory. Until the 1900s, Oysters from the River Roach and sometimes from the River Crouch were called Walfleet (or Walflete) Oysters.

Which one of the four main streams draining the Rayleigh Hills and entering the Rochford Basin is the Roach is ambiguous. Modern Ordnance Survey maps, and all historical editions since they were first published, do not name any of the streams to the west of Rochford. Essex County Council, who publish a 16-page walking guide to the Roach Valley Way, a 23-mile (37 km) route around the district, label the third stream as the River Roach. The Environment Agency, who are responsible for measuring the water quality of English rivers, label the third stream as the Noblesgreen Ditch, and the fourth stream, from Hockley and Hawkwell, as the Roach. However, the Strategic Flood Risk Assessment prepared for Rochford District Council includes a map of the tributaries of the Roach, on which the third stream is called Noblesgreen Ditch, and parts of the fourth stream are called the Hawkwell Brook and River Roach. This usage has been followed here.

== Routes ==
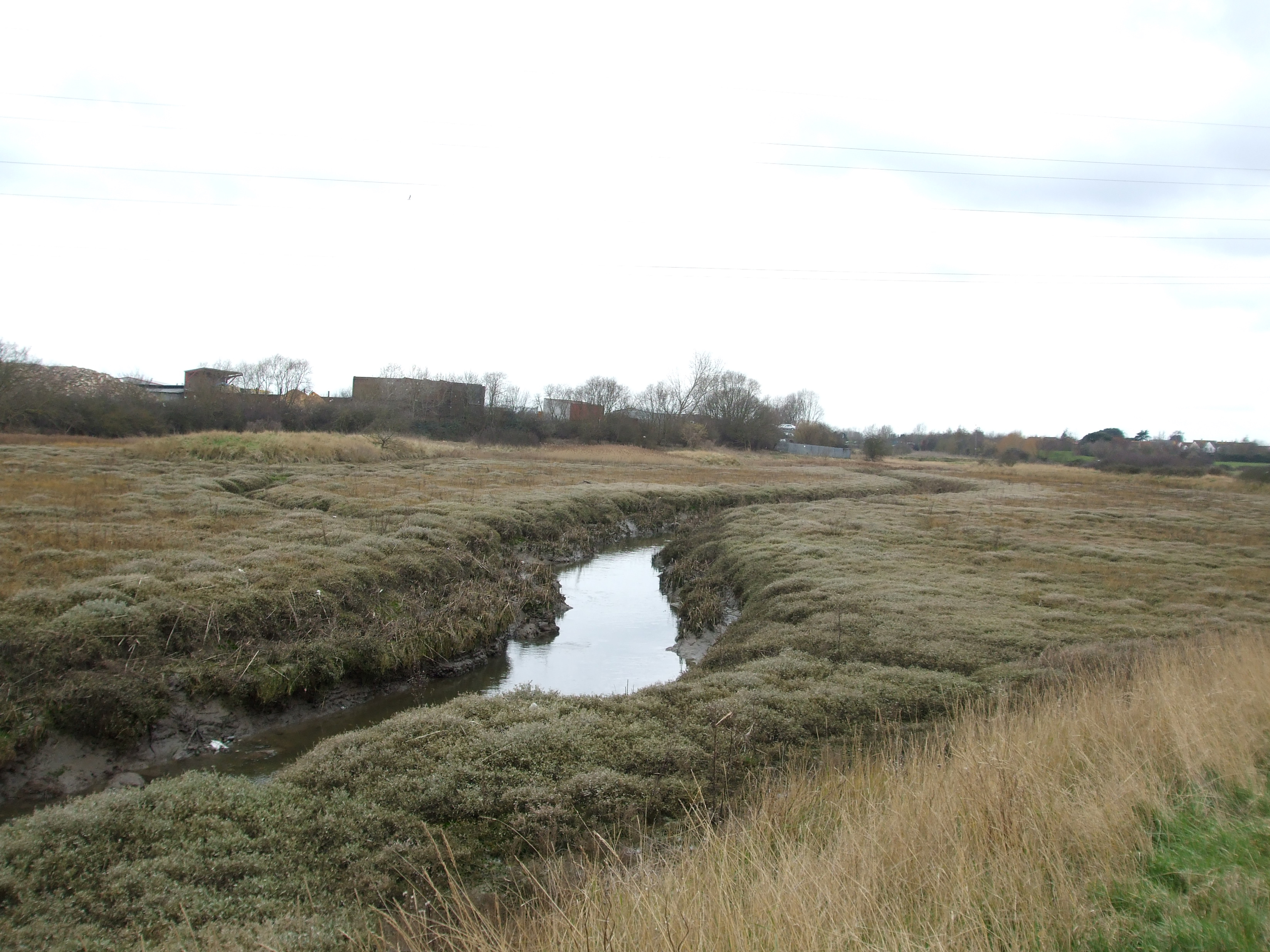
River Roach at Stambridge Mills looking West

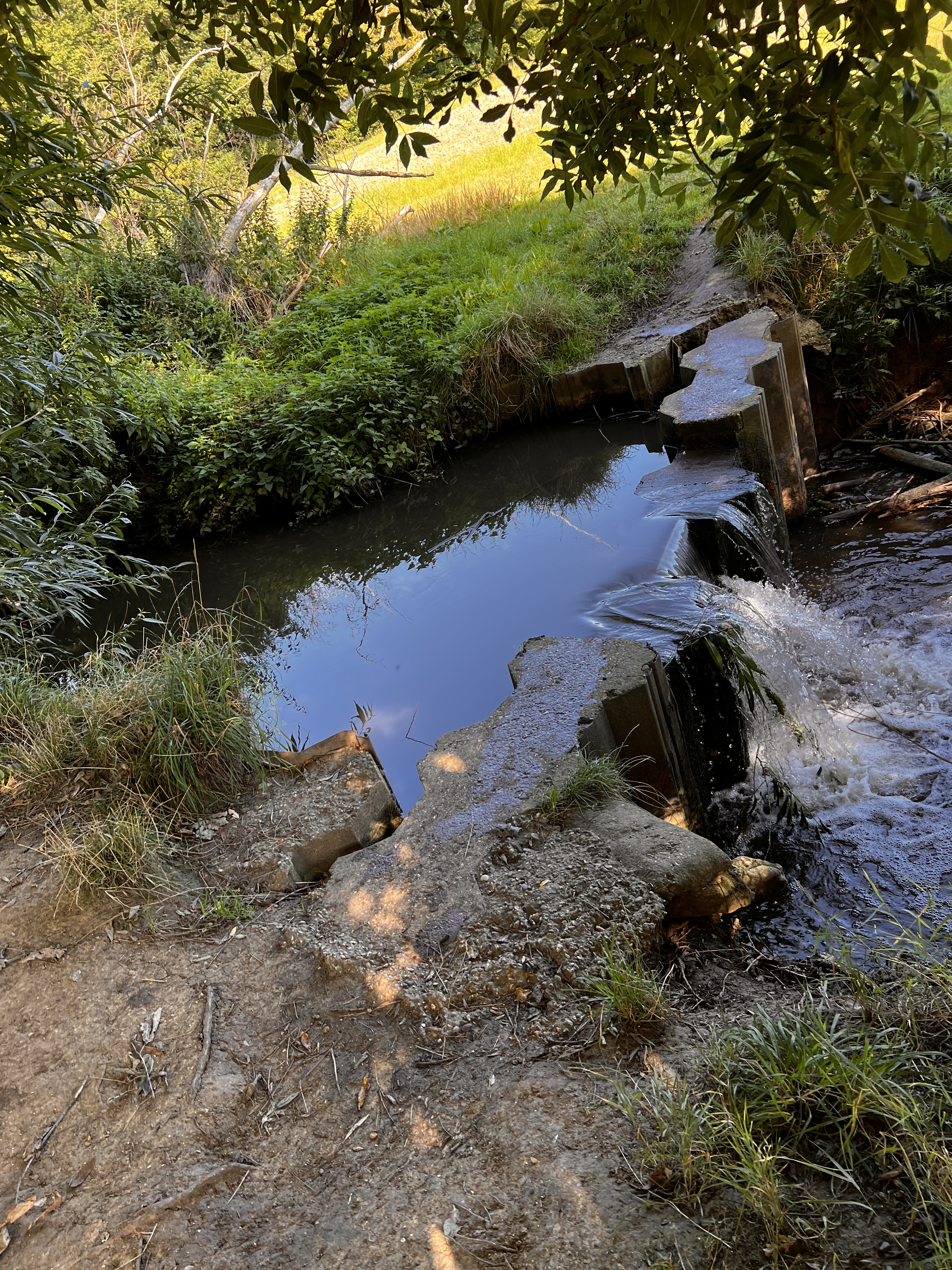
Noblesgreen Ditch Weir

=== Noblesgreen Ditch ===
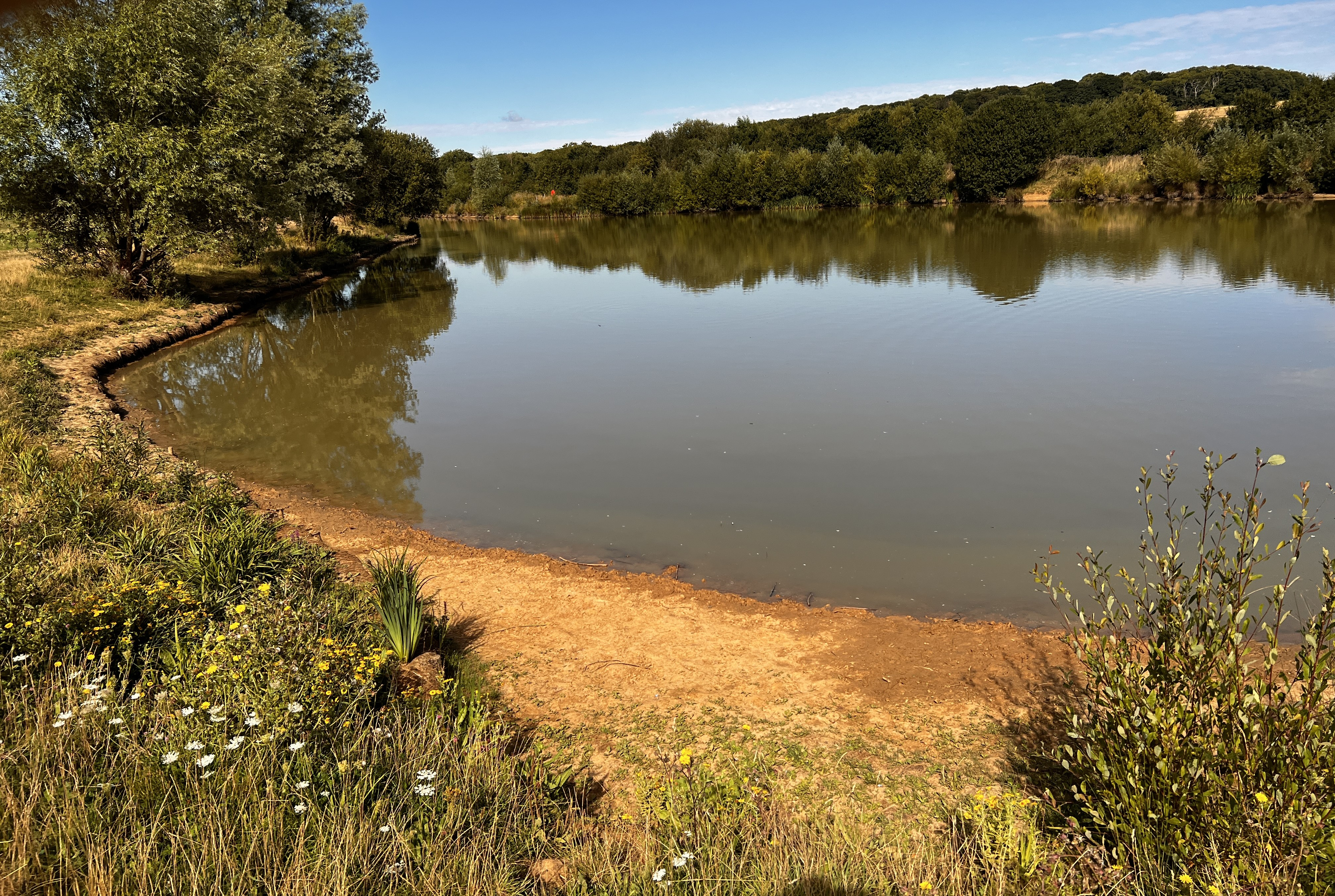
Cherry Orchard Jubilee Country Park Lake

Noblesgreen Ditch rises in the hill near The Gattens and Nelson Road, which are either side of Hockley Road, Rayleigh. The stream is joined by several others, and then runs south, under Bull Lane, beside then under The Chase where it turns to run east behind Milton Close and Bramfield Road East. It then passes north of the Grove Playing Fields, and past Rayleigh Sewage Works where its flow is augmented by the discharge from the reed-bed purification system. With an outflow of 179 litres/second or 15534 m^{3}/day, the sewage works is the largest flow into the ditch. It runs south of Rewreth Hall Wood, north of Grove Woods, and past New England Wood. From there, it flows through the Cherry Orchard Jubilee Country Park, past The Scrubs (wood) where a weir (see image) supplies a feeder channel to the 1.2 ha Cherry Orchard Lake. The stream flows under Cherry Orchard Way (B1013), past Southend Airport and on through Rochford Hundred Golf Course, where it is joined by Eastwood Brook, to reach Rochford. It passes under the Shenfield to Southend Line, and then over a weir, which ensures that water fills Rochford Reservoir, built by the Great Eastern Railway in 1904. Then it is joined by the Roach, and the overflow from the reservoir empties into it soon afterwards.

=== Eastwood Brook ===
The Eastwood Brook is a 7.519 km watercourse comprising one of the tributaries of the River Roach. It has a catchment area of 1133.71 ha. It arises adjacent to the Weir roundabout (51°34'38"N 0°35'58"E), at an elevation of 200 ft above ordnance datum. It flows in an easterly direction to the north of Wyburns school, then south-east to Rayleigh Downs Road. It then runs south of, and parallel to, Rayleigh Road before flowing under Rayleigh Road, Whitehouse Lane, Western Approaches, Cherry Orchard Way and Aviation Way. It then flows in a north-easterly direction along the western boundary of Southend Airport to join the Noblesgreen Ditch at Rochford Golf Course. The Eastwood Brook has an Environment Agency monitoring station at Cherry Orchard Way.

=== Hawkwell Brook ===
The Hawkwell Brook rises on the edge of Hockley Woods, to the north of the former HM Prison Bullwood Hall. It flows eastwards, through the woods and to the south of Great Bull Wood, and runs across the northern end of Belchamps Scout Centre. It is culverted under Elmwood Avenue, and re-emerges to pass under the B1013 Main Road and Thorpe Close in Hawkwell. From this point it is designated as a main river, and is therefore the responsibility of the Environment Agency. It flows to the south of the Clements Hall Sports Complex, to be joined by the Hockley Brook, which rises near Southbourne Grove, Hockley, flows under the Shenfield to Southend Railway and then alongside it, to the junction on the north side of Rectory Road. Now officially the Roach, it turns to the south east, passing under Rectory Road, and continuing to Rochford, running broadly parallel to Ironwell Lane. It then crosses beneath the railway and Hall Road, running beside Bradley Way to reach its junction with Noblesgreen Ditch by Rochford Reservoir.

At Salt Bridge it passes under South Street beside the Horse and Groom public house. The River Roach then continues east, running through flood plain marshes before discharging into the northern arm of the River Roach at Stambridge Mills, 0.6 miles (1 km) downstream from the town. Just after this point, Sutton Wharf with jetties, slipways, a boatyard and moorings, is on the south bank. This is where its main tributary, the Prittle Brook from Leigh-on-Sea and Southend-on-Sea joins as its southern arm.

=== The tidal river ===
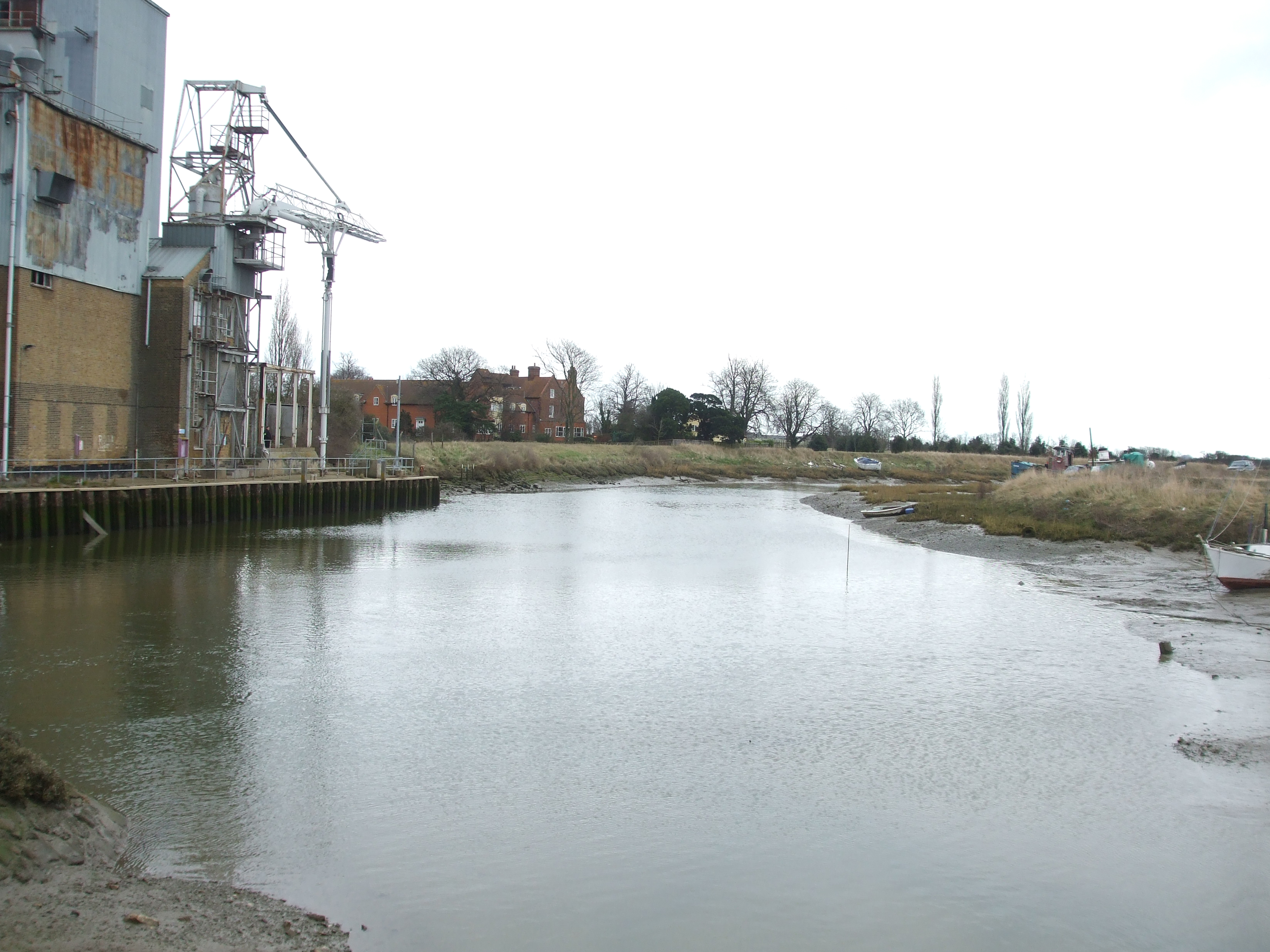
River Roach at Stambridge Mills looking East

From Stambridge Mills eastwards, the River Roach is tidal and becomes a wide river. It passes Great Stambridge Hall, Mucking Hall, Barton Hall and Roper's Farm. Barlinghall Creek joins Potton Creek and is called "The Violet" before it joins the Roach on the right bank. From here the Roach is about 440 yards (400 m) wide. It passes Paglesham, significant for its native oysters and the location of Charles Darwin's HMS Beagle which lies under the mud west of Paglesham's boatyard and slipway. After being retired from the Royal Navy in 1845, the vessel was used by the Coast Guard as a watch ship. It was moved to the centre of the river near Paglesham in 1850, eventually becoming Watch Ship No. 7. Its condition deteriorated, and it was moved to the shore in 1863, to be sold for breaking up in 1870. A six-year archaeological investigation ending in 2008 concluded that much of the vessel still lies beneath 21 feet (6.4 m) of mud near to the Paglesham hard.

Further east, it meets Paglesham Pool on the north bank, a creek which separates Wallasea Island from the mainland, although it is no longer an island, as a causeway has been built across the creek to carry the road onto Wallasea. At Potton Point on Devil's Reach, the Middleway creek, which separates the islands of Potton and Foulness, joins from the south and defines the western edge of Foulness Island. The Middleway creek splits to pass either side of Rushley Island, and becomes Havengore Creek once the two channels rejoin. Shallow-draughted boats can use Havengore Creek to access the river, but the route needs careful preparation, as there is a lifting bridge carrying the road to Foulness Island, which is only opened for a limited period either side of high tide. In addition, Havengore Creek opens out onto Maplin Sands, and boaters must check that the Shoebury Artillery Range is not in operation before crossing the sands. The Roach passes eastwards between Foulness Island and Wallasea Island and then it turns northwards between them, where it widens to almost 660 yards (600 m) until it joins the River Crouch at Wallasea Ness on the Ness Hole. The combined rivers then flow eastwards past Holliwell Point and discharge into the North Sea at Foulness Point.

== Milling ==
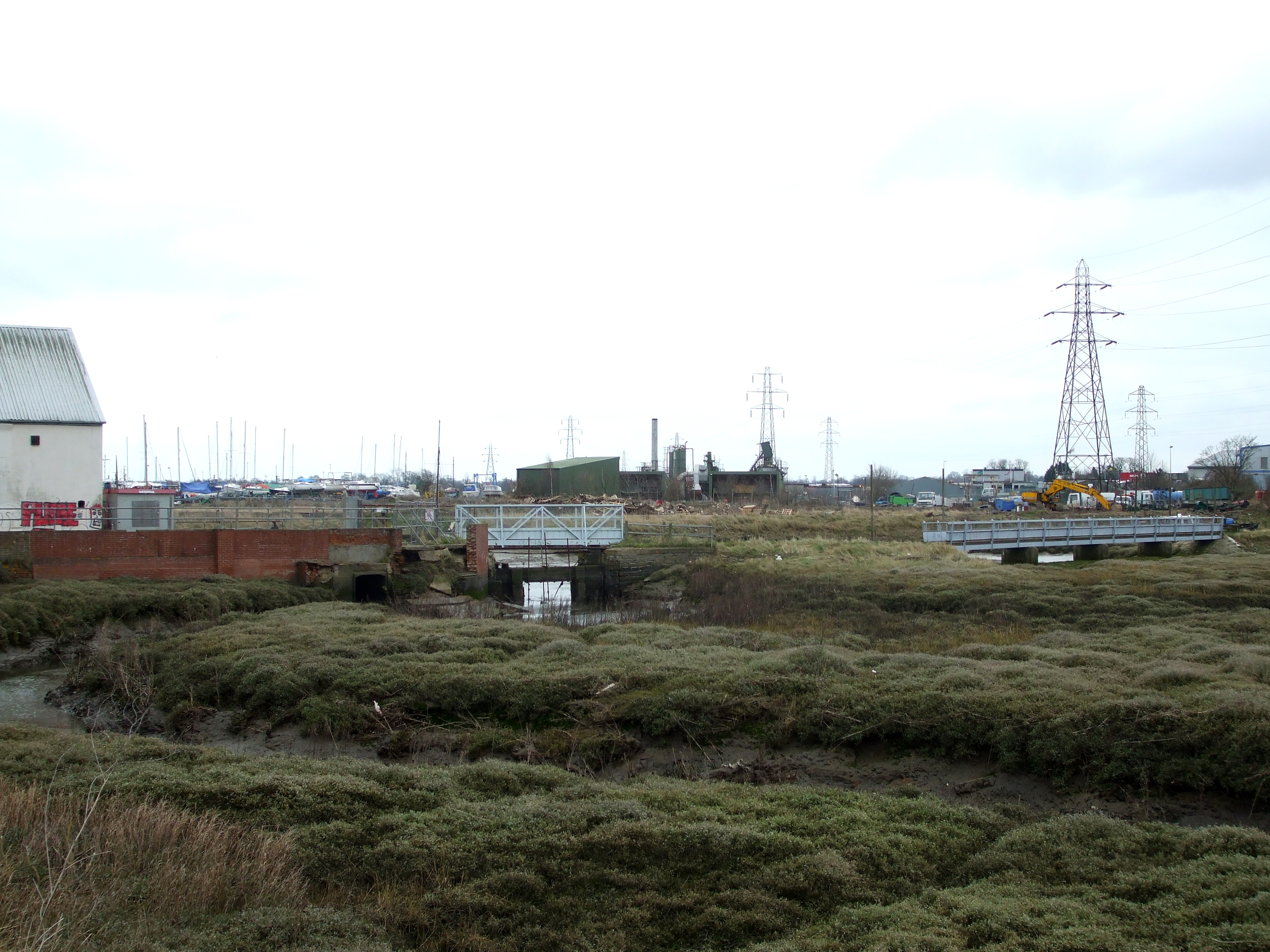
Bridges over the River Roach at Stambridge Mills cross the dam of the mill pound.

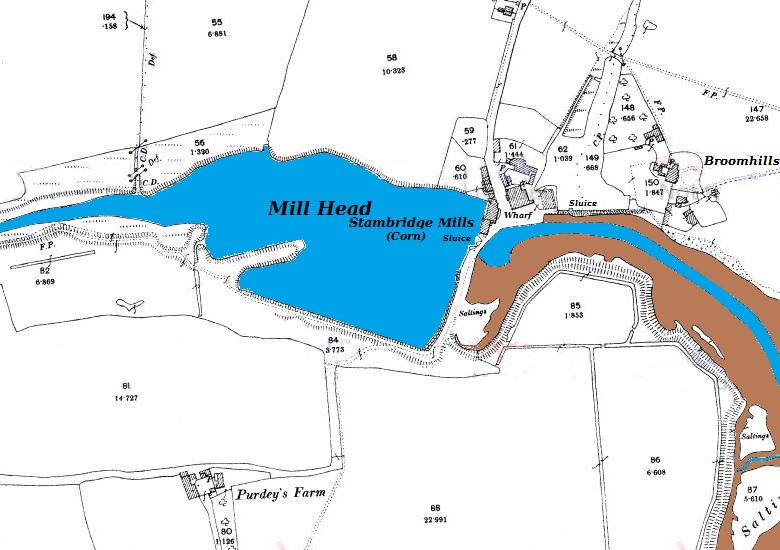
Map showing the tidal pound for Stambridge Tide Mill in 1897

At Stambridge, the modern river transforms from a fairly small channel to a wide tidal estuary. This was once the site of a tide mill. The earliest records for such a mill at Stambridge date from 1500, but apart from the fact that it was rebuilt in 1762, few other details from this period are known. However, in 1809, a new four-storey timber-framed mill was erected on the site. William Hugh Rankin leased the mill in 1824, and after enlarging the mill pond in 1858, bought the mill for £4,500 when it came up for sale in 1867. The Rankin family owned and ran the mill until 1962. A steam-powered mill was built to supplement the tide mill in 1872, but it burnt down in 1878. It was replaced by a five-storey building, constructed of brick, which became the mainstay of the business. The tidal pound gradually silted up, but the tide mill continued to be used until around 1951.

The tidal pound covered around 3 acres (1.2 ha) and was filled by the rising tide through a set of gates similar to those on a lock. As the tide fell, the gates closed. Water from the pound was fed along a short mill-stream, to drive a wheel which was around 18 feet (5.5 m) in diameter. The central shaft was wooden, and was connected to three sets of millstones. Tidal water in the pound was supplemented by the flow from the upper river, particularly at neap tides, when high tide levels were lower. Rankins objected when the Great Eastern Railway wanted to build a reservoir near Rochford railway station, by constructing a weir across the stream. They argued that it damaged their business. At spring tides, the mill pound filled to a depth of 4 feet (1.2 m) above the level of the cill, and this provided enough water to run the mill for 7 hours, but the level and the length of time the mill could be operated dropped off as the tides reduced, and at neap tides, the mill was wholly dependent on water from the upper river.

The water wheel was of the breastshot type, and there was a drop of another 4 feet (1.2 m) between the cill and low water level in the river. The wheel was stated to be 10 feet (3.0 m) wide (which seems more realistic than Charlier and Finkl's 32 feet (9.8 m)), the floats were 12 inches (30 cm) deep, and the wheel was not shrouded. The streams supplied some 950,000 imperial gallons (4,300 m^{3}) of water per day to the pound, based on a catchment area of 7,650 acres (3,100 ha) and an average rainfall of 20 inches (510 mm) per year. The railway would not extract any water if the flow was below 130,000 imperial gallons (590 m^{3}) per day, but could take up to 500,000 imperial gallons (2,300 m^{3}) per day if flows were sufficient. The solicitors acting for Rankins stated, however, that there was considerable leakage through the mill head, and the unshrouded wheel made their case much weaker. The wheel suffered from subsidence in 1951, which prevented further use, and the mill burnt down in 1964, two years after Rankins sold the operation to Associated British Foods.

The Great Eastern Railway initially wanted to construct two reservoirs and a weir, but in addition to opposition from Rankins, who claimed compensation, there was also opposition from Rochford District Council. They drew water from the stream to water the streets, and feared that this supply would be lost. The Railway Company obtained an Act of Parliament in 1904, which allowed them to build the weir and one of the reservoirs. It can still be seen beside the Bradley Way bypass.

== Administration ==
The River Roach is part of the River Crouch and Roach tidal river system which includes all of the creeks around Wallasea Island, Foulness Island, Potton Island, New England Island, Havengore Island and Rushley Island. The tidal flow around the creeks between those latter islands considerably affects the tides in the River Roach. Those creeks and tidal flows also enhance the River Roach's habitat and conditions for oyster cultivation and fish spawning.

The River Roach is part of the Crouch Harbour. It is administered by the Crouch Harbour Authority, which was created by the Crouch Harbour Act 1974. It is a not-for-profit organisation and is based in Burnham-on-Crouch. As well as regulating all aspects of marine activity on the rivers, the Authority owns much of the river bed of the Crouch, and some parts of the Roach. The River Roach benefits from the Burnham inshore lifeboat run by the Royal National Lifeboat Institution and an Essex fire service boat, which is also based at Burnham.

== Water quality ==
The Environment Agency measure the water quality of the river systems in England. Each is given an overall ecological status, which may be one of five levels: high, good, moderate, poor and bad. There are several components that are used to determine this, including biological status, which looks at the quantity and varieties of invertebrates, angiosperms and fish, and chemical status, which compares the concentrations of various chemicals against known safe concentrations. Chemical status is rated good or fail. All of the tributaries above Rochford are designated as "heavily modified", which means that the channels have been altered by human activity, and the criteria for this designation are defined by the Water Framework Directive.

The water quality of the Roach system was as follows in 2019.

Section	Ecological Status	Chemical Status	Length	Catchment	Channel
Roach	Moderate	Fail	3.9 miles (6.3 km)	4.90 square miles (12.7 km^{2})	heavily modified
Noblesgreen Ditch	Moderate	Fail	4.8 miles (7.7 km)	3.80 square miles (9.8 km^{2})	heavily modified
Eastwood Brook	Moderate	Fail	4.7 miles (7.6 km)	4.38 square miles (11.3 km^{2})	heavily modified
Prittle Brook	Moderate	Fail	7.0 miles (11.3 km)	7.79 square miles (20.2 km^{2})	heavily modified
Crouch (inc tidal Roach)	Moderate	Good			heavily modified

The water quality improved after 2014, when all of the streams above Rochford had a chemical status of fail. However, like most rivers in the UK, the chemical status changed from good back to fail in 2019, due to the presence of polybrominated diphenyl ethers (PBDE), perfluorooctane sulphonate (PFOS) and mercury compounds, none of which had previously been included in the assessment.

The Food Standards Agency imposed a ban on the catching of shellfish in March 2015, when extremely high levels of the pathogen E. coli were found in the reach at Barton Hall. The problem was traced to faulty plumbing at a number of homes, which resulted in raw sewage entering the river. Although Anglian Water were not responsible for the faulty workmanship, they rectified the problem, and carried out other work to the sewage system. The fishing ban was lifted in February 2017, when pathogen levels had returned to safe levels.

== Points of interest ==
Point	Coordinates (Links to map resources)	OS Grid Ref	Notes
Source of Hawkwell Brook	51.5973°N 0.6322°E	TQ824919	
Source of Hockley Brook	51.6050°N 0.6729°E	TQ851929	
Hockley Brook joins Hawkwell Brook	51.5946°N 0.6805°E	TQ857918	
Rochford Reservoir	51.5802°N 0.7056°E	TQ875902	
Source of Noblesgreen Ditch	51.5869°N 0.6245°E	TQ819908	
Source of Eastwood Brook	51.5679°N 0.6573°E	TQ842887	
Eastwood Brook joins Noblesgreen Ditch	51.5779°N 0.6978°E	TQ870900	
Stambridge Millpond	51.5798°N 0.7217°E	TQ886902	
Source of Prittlewell Brook	51.5636°N 0.6011°E	TQ803881	
Prittlewell Brook joins tidal Roach	51.5730°N 0.7138°E	TQ881895	
Junction with Paglesham Pool	51.5972°N 0.8215°E	TQ955924	
River Roach joins River Crouch	51.6160°N 0.8709°E	TQ988946	Mouth

== Navigation aid ==
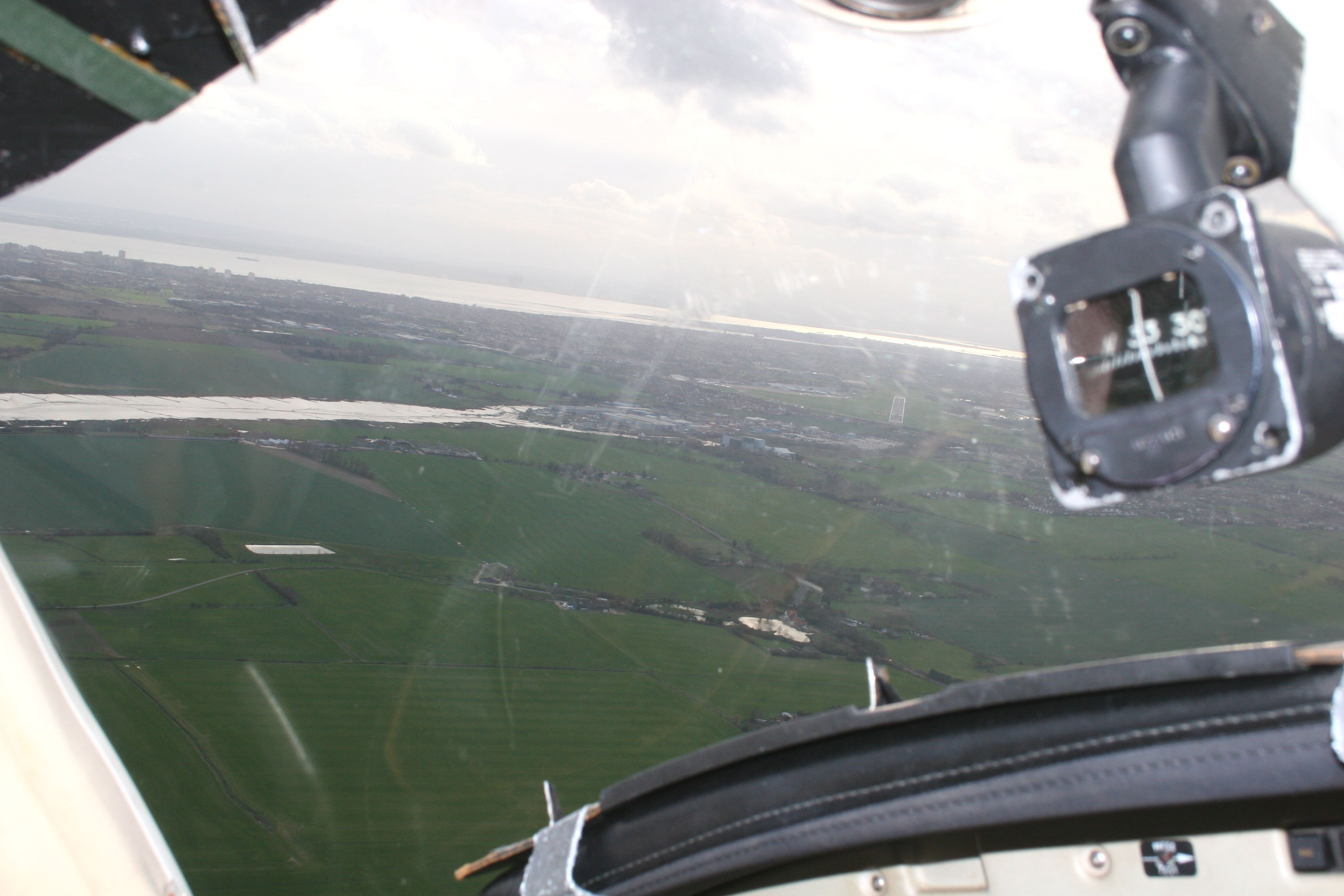
Aircraft on final for runway 24

Light aircraft based at Southend Airport use the Roach as a navigation aid to guide them back to the runway.

When flying visually the visibility is not always good enough to see long distances, so pilots use geographic features to confirm their position with what is shown on their charts. The Roach flows past Purdeys Industrial Estate, Rochford, which is very close to the threshold of Runway 24. Pilots returning from a flight north east of the airport would use the Roach to help align themselves with the runway.

The Roach can be seen in the centre left of the photo. The runway can just be seen to the left of the Compass. The photo was taken 2.25 miles (3.62 km) or 1.96 nautical miles from the runway threshold.

== Bibliography ==
- Charlier, R.H.; Finkl, Charles W. (2009). Ocean Energy: Tide and Tidal Power. Springer. ISBN 978-3-540-77931-5.
- Cole, Eleanor; Littlewood, Sarak (February 2011). Strategic Flood Risk Assessment (PDF). Rochford District Council. Archived (PDF) from the original on 31 December 2020.
- Cumberlidge, Jane (2009). Inland Waterways of Great Britain (8th Ed.). Imray Laurie Norie and Wilson. ISBN 978-1-84623-010-3.
- Fautley, Matthew; Garon, James (2005). Essex Coastline: Then and Now. Potton Publishing. ISBN 978-0-9548010-0-7.
- Sier, Robert (2016). "Water Mills of the Rivers Crouch and Roach" (PDF). Essex Mills. Archived (PDF) from the original on 1 September 2018.
- Stratford, Richard (2004). Bombarded Britain – A Search for British Impact Structures. Imperial College Press. ISBN 978-1-86094-356-0.
