= Maplin Sands =

Mudflats on Thames estuary in Essex, England

Coordinates: 51.56°N 0.90°E

The Maplin Sands are mudflats on the northern bank of the Thames estuary, off Foulness Island, near Southend-on-Sea in Essex, England, though they actually lie within the neighbouring borough of Rochford. They form a part of the Essex Estuaries Special Area of Conservation due to their value for nature conservation, with a large colony of dwarf eelgrass (Zostera noltei) and associated animal communities.

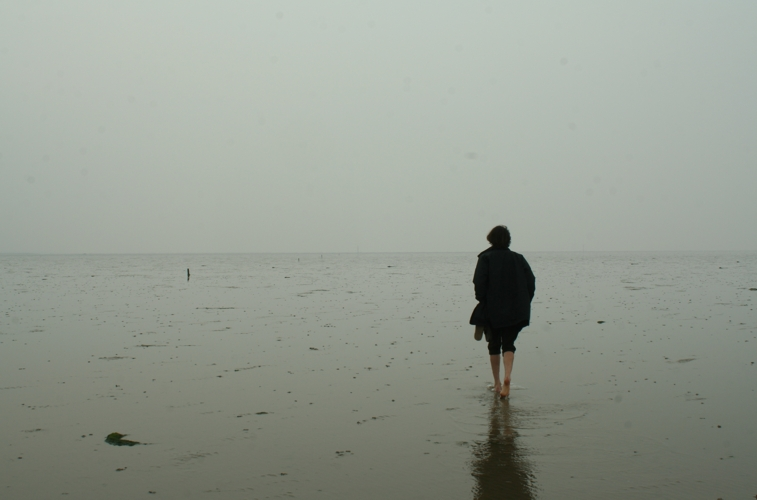
A walker on the Broomway, an ancient trackway which runs along the foreshore of Maplin Sands

To the northeast, the Maplin sands are contiguous with the Foulness sands, which are bordered to the north by the Whitaker Channel; the seaward continuation of the River Crouch. To the south runs the Swin Channel.

== History ==
Maplin Sands is crossed by the ancient trackway known as The Broomway.

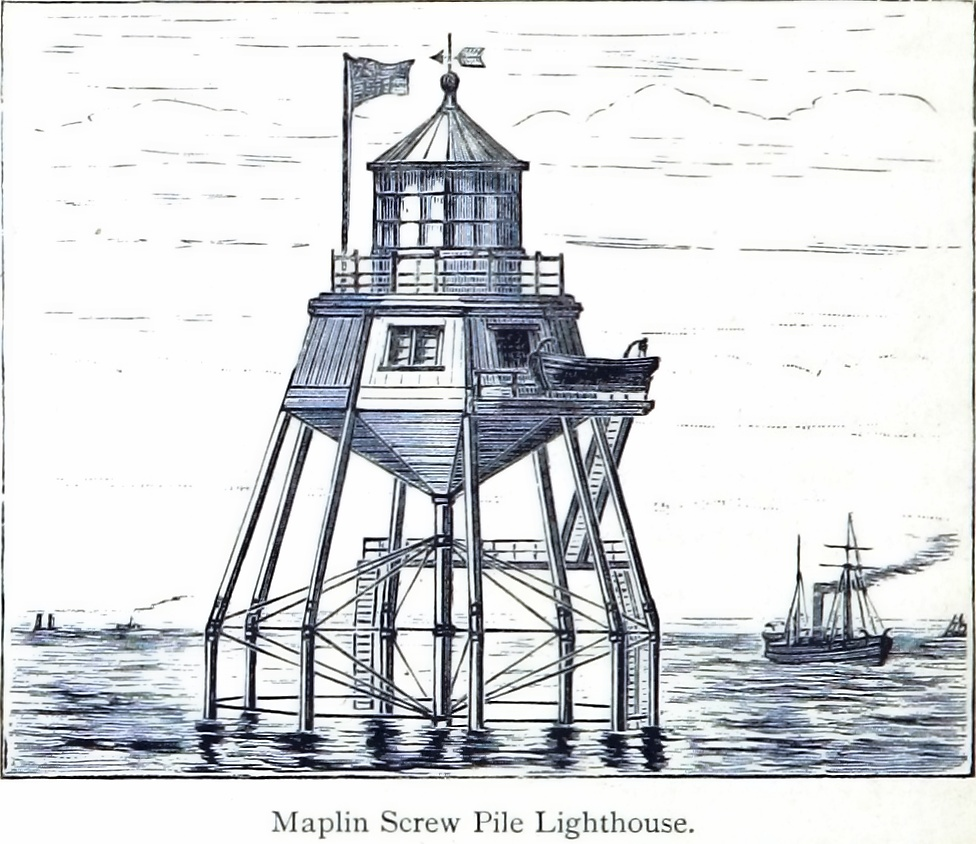
Maplin Screw Pile Lighthouse

A screw-pile lighthouse was built on the sands in 1838 by Messrs. Mitchel and Sons (sic- more often Mitchell and Sons) on the recommendation of James Walker of Trinity House. It was the first screwpile lighthouse ever to be designed. Although construction of the Maplin Sands Light had started before the Wyre Light in Fleetwood, Lancashire, the latter was completed first, as it was built in a much shorter period of time. Excessive scouring of the Thames by the strength and direction of the tidal streams caused the lighthouse to become undermined and it was completely swept away in 1932.

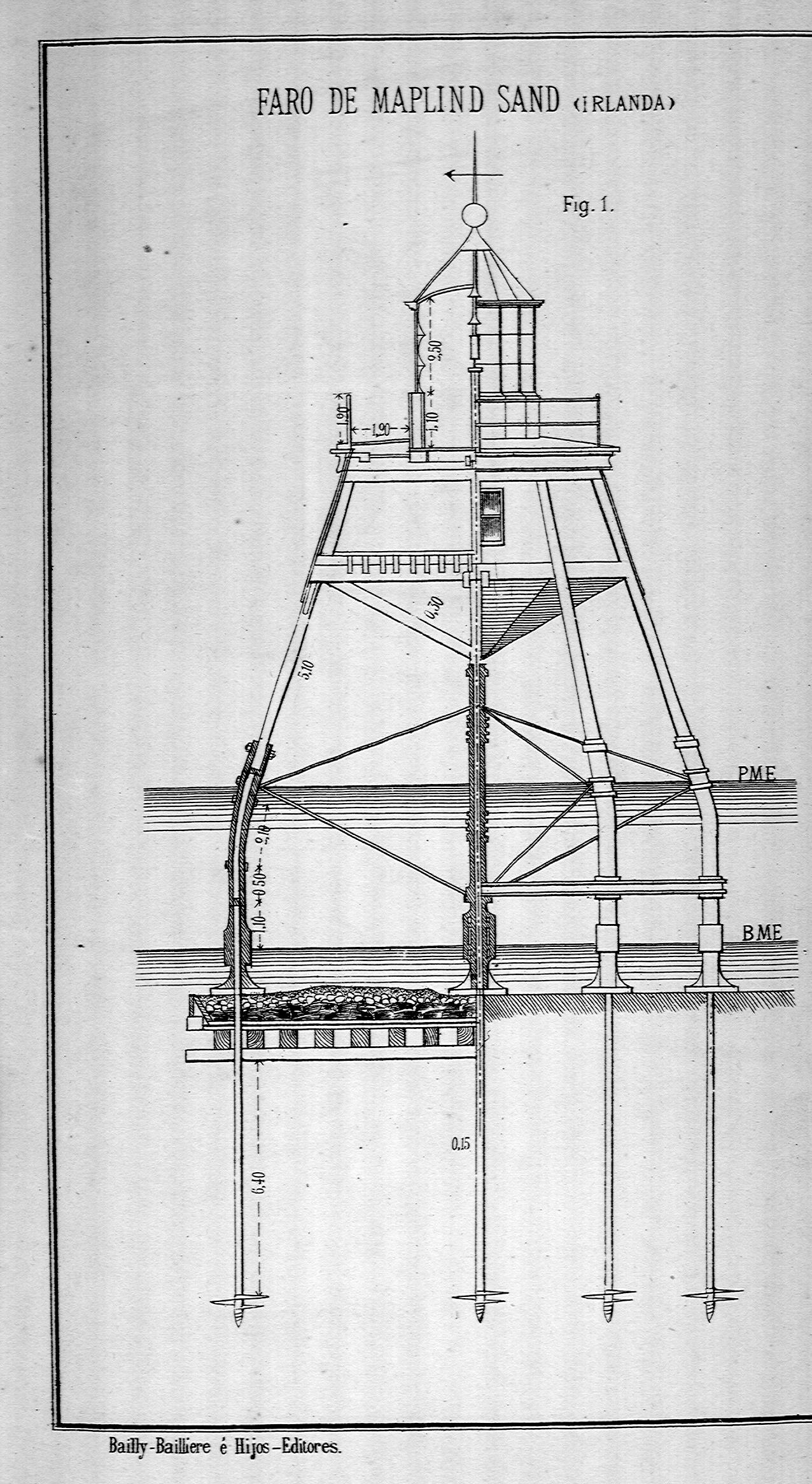
Maplin sand lighthouse as per drawing by José Eugenio Ribera.

In the later part of the 19th century John I. Thornycroft & Company and Yarrow Shipbuilders used the sands for the measured mile speed trials of their destroyers. The shallow waters resulted in a flow of water that could add up to a knot to the ship's speed. When the Admiralty found out, they required that all future trials be carried out in deep water.

Following the report of the 1968 Roskill Commission, in 1973 plans were proposed and approved for a third airport for London, the Thames Estuary Airport, but these plans were abandoned in 1974 in the wake of the 1973 oil crisis. The project would also have included a deep-water harbour suitable for the container ships then coming into use, a high-speed rail link to London, and a new town for the accommodation of the thousands of workers who would be required.

The Maplin Sands were at that time, and remain, a military testing ground belonging to the Ministry of Defence, as is Foulness Island.

== See also ==
- Alexander Mitchell (engineer)
- List of lighthouses in England
- Screw-pile lighthouse
- Wyre Light (Fleetwood)
