= Foulness Island =

Human settlement in Essex, England

Coordinates: 51.5976°N 0.8954°E

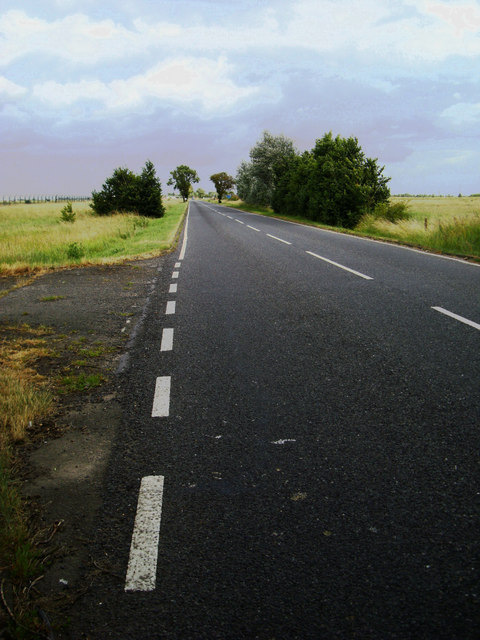

- Location within Essex
- Population: 158 (Parish, 2021)
- Civil parish: Foulness
- District: Rochford
- Shire county: Essex
- Region: East
- Country: England
- Sovereign state: United Kingdom
- Post town: Southend-on-Sea
- Postcode district: SS3
- Dialling code: 01702
- Police: Essex
- Fire: Essex
- Ambulance: East of England

Ramsar Wetland
- Designated: 14 October 1996
- Reference no.: 861

Foulness Island (/faʊlˈnɛs/) is an island in Essex, England, in the Thames estuary. It is separated from the mainland by narrow creeks. The island is usually closed to the general public, having been taken over for military use in 1914. The island forms a civil parish called Foulness, which had a population of 158 at the 2021 census.

The main settlements on the island are Churchend and Courtsend, both at the northern end of the island. By July 2022 the general store and post office in Churchend had been abandoned. The George and Dragon pub in Churchend closed in 2007, while the church of St Mary the Virgin closed in May 2010. In 2019, the Southend Echo reported plans for the church to be converted into a five-bedroom home.

Foulness Island is predominantly farmland and is protected from the sea by a sea wall. The island's unusual name is derived from the Old English fugla næsse ("bird headland"), referring to wildfowl. It is an internationally important site for migrating and breeding birds, including pied avocets. During the North Sea flood of 1953, almost the entire island was flooded and two people died.

Before 1922, when the military road was built, the only access was across the Maplin Sands via the Broomway, a tidal path said to predate the Romans, or by boat. Public rights of way exist, but the island is now run by QinetiQ on behalf of the Ministry of Defence as MoD Shoeburyness with access to the island by non-residents subject to stringent times and restrictions.

== Geography ==
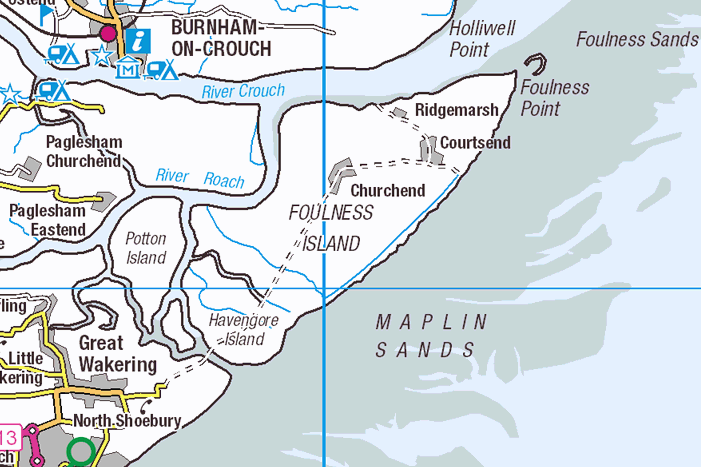
Map of Foulness Island

The island covers 9.195 square miles (23.81 km^{2}) bounded by its sea walls. Before 1847, tithes were payable in kind, but under the terms of the Tithe Act 1836, these were replaced by payments of money. The commutation commission, who were responsible for setting the level of payments, produced a details schedule and map in 1847, which provides a detailed land usage survey. At the time, the island included 425 acres (172 ha) of saltings, outside the sea wall. The 5,885 acres (2,382 ha) inside the wall comprised 4,554 acres (1,843 ha) of arable land, with pasture covering another 783 acres (317 ha). 338 acres (137 ha) were described as inland water, which was made up of ponds and drainage ditches, while buildings, roads, the sea walls, and some waste ground made up the remaining 222 acres (90 ha). The arable land was used to grow cereal crops, namely wheat, oats and barley, and beans, white mustard and clover.

Cheap imports of wheat from America caused widespread depression among agricultural communities in the 1870s, with much arable land reverting to rough pasture. However, a map attached to the report of the Royal Commission on Agriculture (Essex), which reported in 1894, shows that no land on the island reverted to pasture up to 1880, despite some 25% reverting in the neighbouring Rochford hundred. Great Burwood Farm had 47 acres (19 ha) of its 389 acres (157 ha) in use as pasture in 1858, which had dropped to just 12 acres (4.9 ha) in 1899. Land prices in the same period dropped dramatically, as the farm was bought for £11,165 in 1858 and sold for only £1,800 in 1899, losing 84% of its value. By the 1970s, the smaller farms had amalgamated into five large farming businesses.

== Sea defences ==
The surface of the island, and much of South East England, has been sinking relative to normal tide levels since the end of the last Ice Age. There is no evidence for sea defences in the period of Roman occupation, although the area was flooded in AD 31 by an exceptional tide, which forced a withdrawal to Shoeburyness. The Anglo-Saxon Chronicle also records an exceptional tide on 11 November 1099 which flooded the land, but these were rare occurrences. The first defences were probably erected in the late 12th century. By 1210, the "law of the marsh" was in effect: it required that the cost of such defences should be paid for by those who benefited from them, in proportion to the amount of land owned or rented, and this remained the case until the Land Drainage Act 1930. In 1335, 1338 and 1346, commissioners were sent to inspect the state of the banks in the Rochford hundred, which included Foulness.

The earliest record of sea walls is from 1271, and in 1348 there were problems with one of the marshes, which was flooding every day, indicating that it was below the level of normal tides. The sea walls were made of earth, and were thatched with hurdles of brushwood and rushes. The island was divided into 11 or 12 marshes, each with its own wall, rather than one wall around the whole area, and was extended in 1420 by a new wall around New Wick Marsh, and again between 1424 and 1486, when Arundel Marsh was enclosed. Ditches ran between the walls of the marshes, with sluices at the ends where the ditches met the sea. At high water, the island would effectively be divided into a number of smaller islands. A Commission of Sewers was appointed in 1695, whose jurisdiction included Foulness, but the inhabitants were not happy, and engaged the lawyer Sir John Brodrick to put their case. They argued that an exceptional high tide had flooded the island in 1690, but that they had repaired and improved the walls themselves, and therefore should not be taxed by the Commissioners. Eventually, Foulness had its own Commission, from 1800 to the early 1900s.

The size of the island has been increased several times by "innings". Saltings build up along the shore from silt which is carried to the sea by the rivers, and is deposited on the shore by the tide. Salt-loving plants then take root in the mud, and the salting is established. The plants trap sediments, and the surface rises until it remains above the level of most tides. Inning occurs when a sea wall is built around the edge of the salting, after which rain washes the salt downwards. The alluvium which forms the soil is highly fertile once freshwater plants start to grow. The inning of New Wick Marsh added 220 acres (89 ha), and Arundel March covered 385 acres (156 ha). No new innings took place in the 1500s, as there were several exceptional tides, and activity was centred on maintaining the existing defences, but another 170 acres (69 ha) was added between 1620 and 1662, and there was further activity between 1687 and 1688, in 1801, and finally in 1833. In total, 1,632 acres (660 ha) were added to the island.

== Development ==
The Broomway provided the main access to Foulness for centuries. It is an ancient track, which starts at Wakering Stairs, and runs for 6 miles (10 km) along the Maplin Sands, some 440 yards (400 m) from the present shoreline. The seaward side of the track was defined by bunches of twigs and sticks, shaped like upside-down besom brooms or fire-brooms, which are buried in the sands. Six headways run from the track to the shore, giving access to local farms. The track was extremely dangerous in misty weather, as the incoming tide floods across the sands at high speed, and the water forms whirlpools because of flows from the River Crouch and River Roach. Under such conditions, the direction of the shore cannot be determined, and the parish registers record the burials of many people who were drowned.

The island was also served by ferries, which carried fresh water as well as people. The carriage of water is mentioned in the accounts kept by the bailiffs in 1420, 1424 and 1486. By the middle of the 19th century, ferries ran to Burnham-on-Crouch, Potton Island and Wallasea Island. There was initially no source of fresh water on the island apart from any rainwater that could be collected. In 1725, it was thought that there might be water below the island, and a well was constructed on Great Shelford Marsh. It reached a depth of 92 feet (28 m), but no water was found. At the end of the 1700s, Francis Bannester, who owned Rushley Island nearby, attempted to find water by boring, but again failed to do so. However, his son, also called Francis, persisted and found fresh water some 500 feet (150 m) below Rushley in 1828. Just six years later, there were more than 20 such springs scattered through the six islands of which Foulness is one, and fourteen farms on the island had their own wells by 1889.

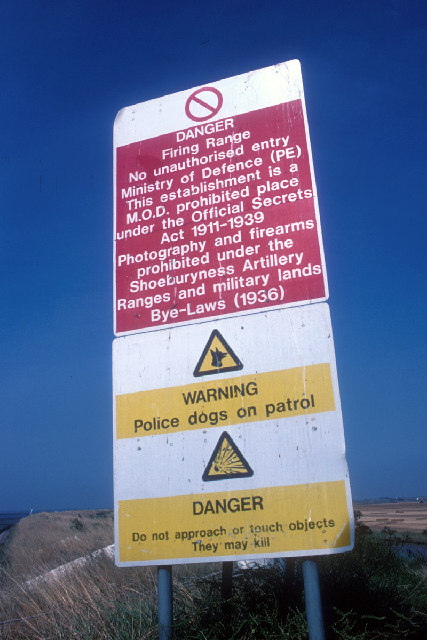
Official Secrets Acts 1911 to 1939 warning sign, in 1988.

Evidence for housing comes from the census returns. In 1801, 396 people lived in 43 houses, which gives an average occupancy of 9.2 people. This had increased to 9.8 in 1811, when 450 people occupied 46 houses. Ownership of the manor was inherited by George Finch in 1826, who took his responsibilities seriously, and set about improving the island by building brick houses for his tenants. Five years later, 630 people lived in 78 houses, and by 1851, 109 dwellings housed 640 people, with average occupancy down to 5.9 people. Population peaked at 754 in the census of 1871, but has steadily declined since.

=== Military use ===
From 1855, the Shoebury Sands, which are a continuation of the Maplin Sands to the south of the island, had been used as an artillery testing site, and the War Office sought to extend this at the end of the 19th century, by buying the island and its offshore sands, to act as a research and development centre for new weapons. They bought some of the sands above Fisherman's Head in 1900, but the rest belonged to Alan Finch, the Lord of the Manor, and he refused to grant shooting rights over them. In 1912, the War Office also discovered that large areas of the sands were leased to tenants, who used them for fishing with kiddles. A kiddle was a large V-shaped or square wicker trap, which formed an enclosure in which fish were trapped as the tide receded.

=== Military takeover ===
Attempts to buy the lordship were also refused by Finch, but he died in 1914, and his half-brother Wilfred Henry Montgomery Finch sold it on 13 July 1915, resulting in the War Office owning around two-thirds of the island. They had also been buying any farms that were not part of the manor, and by the end of the First World War the only buildings which they did not own were the church and rectory, the school, and a mission hall at Courts End. They demolished the post mill towards the beginning of the war, and the parish poor-house and a wooden lock-up which was located near the church were also demolished.

One benefit of the takeover was the construction of the military road in 1922, which crosses New England Island and Havengore Island by a series of bridges, to reach the mainland near Great Wakering. After its opening, the Broomway ceased to be used, except by the military. With the passing of the Ministry of Defence Act 1946 and the subsequent rationalisation of five agencies in 1971, ownership of the island passed from the War Office to the Ministry of Defence. In 2003, a contract to manage the testing of munitions was awarded to the defence contractors QinetiQ, and they also control access to the island.

== Proposals ==
In the 1850s, the South Essex Estuary and Reclamation Company proposed a grand scheme to reclaim around 47.5 square miles (123 km^{2}) of land on the Essex coast, which would have included most of Foulness Sands and Maplin Sands. The civil engineer Sir John Rennie produced the plans, and an Act of Parliament was obtained in 1852. This authorised the construction of a 20-mile (32 km) wall, running from Wakering Stairs to beyond Foulness Point. A small amount of work was carried out on another part of the scheme near Bradwell-on-Sea, but the company was wound up in 1868. Lack of finance and opposition from landowners contributed to its failure.

Another scheme was proposed by William Napier and William Hope in January 1862, in response to requests from the Metropolitan Board for imaginative ways to generate a profit from the large quantities of sewage which had been conveyed away from London by Joseph Bazalgette's sewer system. Hope had experience of reclamation and irrigation works in mainland Spain and Mallorca. Their scheme envisaged a 44-mile (71 km) culvert from the northern outfall to Rawreth, where a northern branch would convey sewage to Dengie Flats, and a southern one to Maplin Sands. Some 20,000 acres (81 km^{2}) would be reclaimed on both sides of the River Crouch, which would become prime agricultural land. Among several schemes, it was the only one which came with detailed plans, and was accepted by the Board, despite opposition from the City of London, who argued that the soil on Maplin Sands was unsuitable for irrigation with sewage.

The estimated cost of the scheme was £2.1 million, with pumping costs of between £10,000 and £13,000 per year. The Metropolitan Sewage and Essex Reclamation Company was set up, and deposited £25,000 with the Board, to be refunded on completion. Construction work began in late 1865, and the Board remained confident that the scheme would be completed, but the collapse of the Overend Gurney bank precipitated a crisis in the City of London, which made it difficult to raise the finance. A report by the Board for 1867-8 stated that no progress had been made for some time, and all reference to the scheme had ceased by 1871. The board kept the £25,000, the only money that the London ratepayers ever received for their sewage, despite claims at the time that it was worth over £4 million.

Around 100 years later, the Roskill Commission investigated potential sites for a third London airport. Four sites were considered, including construction of an off-shore airport on Maplin Sands. The Commission chose a site at Cublington but the incumbent Conservative government rejected the commission's proposal and accepted a dissenting report recommending that a new airport should be developed at Foulness. The Maplin Development Act received royal assent in October 1973. In 1973 a Special Development Order was made under the Town and Country Planning Act granting planning permission for the project, and the Maplin Development Authority was constituted and began its work. The project would have included not just a major airport, but a deep-water harbour suitable for the container ships then starting to revolutionise maritime transport, a high-speed rail link together with the M12 and M13 motorways to London, and a new town for the accommodation of the thousands of workers who would be required. The new town was to cover 82 square miles, with a population of 600,000 people. The cost was to be a then-astronomical £825 million (£8.97 billion in 2025), which many regarded as unacceptable. The Maplin project was abandoned in July 1974 when Labour had come to power in the shadow of the 1973 oil crisis.

== 1953 flood ==
Most of the island was flooded in 1953, as a result of exceptional weather conditions which affected much of the Netherlands and the east coast of England. High water at Southend was expected to be 8.7 feet (2.7 m) above mean sea level at 1:30 am on Sunday 1 February. The actual tide rose to 15.7 feet (4.8 m) above mean sea level, which was 3.5 feet (1.1 m) above the danger level for this part of the Essex coast. This level in itself was not a danger to the island, as the sea walls had been raised and strengthened between 1951 and 1952 by the War Office, and were 16.5 feet (5.0 m) above mean sea level. However, the high water was accompanied by strong winds, creating large waves, which broke over the top of the defences, washing away the earth banks on the inland side of the walls. Two sections of the wall breached, from Rugwood Head to Asplin's Head on the eastern side of the island, and for about 1 mile (1.6 km) to the west of Foulness Point on the northern side of the island. By 6:00 am, most of it was under water, and gas, electricity and telephone links had been severed. Rescue attempts on the Sunday failed to reach Foulness.

Plans were formulated by the army, the Southend lifeboat service and various civilian services for a rescue attempt on the Monday. Great Wakering village hall and the Royal Corinthian Yacht Club at Burnham-on-Crouch were prepared as reception centres, and a flotilla of small boats, the lifeboat, a barge and an army DUKW amphibious truck reached the stranded people and evacuated them to the reception centres. 30 men refused to leave, because of the plight of their livestock, but 24 of them were compulsorily evacuated the following day. Two people died in the disaster. Rescue of the animals was difficult, because the road was not accessible, and all access to the island was across the sands, using the Broomway to Fisherman's Head, which was only possible at low tide. On Wednesday 4 February, a number of DUKWs and four-wheel-drive lorries reached the island with food and water for the stranded animals, which were rounded up and assembled at the churchyard, where the land is slightly higher. The following day, they were moved to Newhouse Farm, near Fisherman's Head, ready for the arrival of 24 cattle lorries, which drove across the sands early on Friday morning. Most of the animals had been rescued by Saturday night, with the final sixteen dairy cows leaving by barge on Sunday morning. 400 cattle, 14 calves, 28 horses, 72 sheep, 6 lambs, 3 pigs, 670 chickens, 100 ducks, 2 dogs, 10 rabbits, 4 budgerigars and the 16 dairy cows were rescued. Around 700 sheep and 249 pigs were drowned.

In order to repair the walls before the next spring tides, which were due on 16 February, 300 soldiers and 70 sailors were drafted in. Three Royal Navy minesweepers, the Cheerful, Cockatrice and Rinaldo, were moored near Foulness Point, and were used as accommodation for the workers. The number of personnel had increased to 400 soldiers and 100 sailors by 11 February. High tide on 14 February was 1.5 feet (0.46 m) higher than expected, and washed away a section of the repaired wall at Shelford Creek, but repairs were again made, and the walls survived the spring tides of the following two days. Re-occupation of the island was delayed until 19 March, to ensure that the new walls would withstand the spring tides due on 14 and 15 March, but many people commuted to their homes each day to begin the task of cleaning up the mess. Of the 114 families who had been evacuated, 80 returned on 19 March.

== Conservation ==
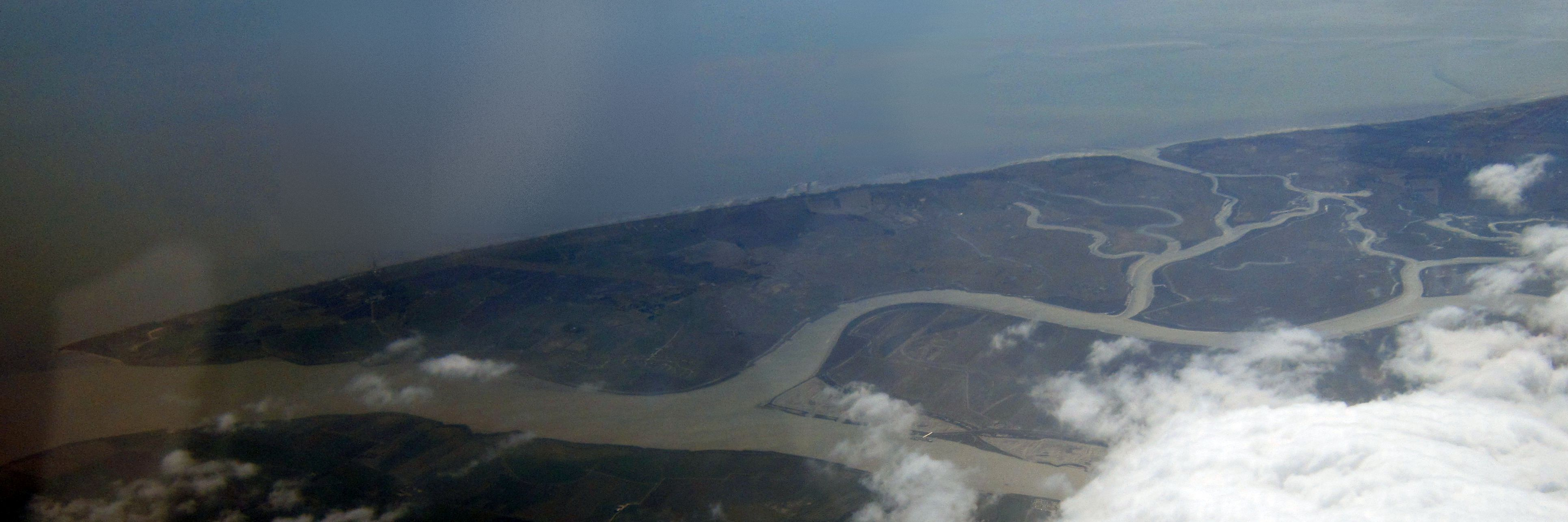
Foulness and Potton Island, as they appear in 2013

The island's name is derived from the Old English fugla-næss, with fugla (modern "fowl") meaning "of birds" and naess being the Germanic word for promontory, and it remains an important centre for birds, with the area around Foulness Point designated as a Site of Special Scientific Interest (SSSI). Habitat is provided by extensive mud flats and sand flats, which are covered twice a day by the tides, together with salt marshes, banks of shingle and shells, grazing marshes, rough grass and scrubland. They are recognised as being internationally important for six species of birds. Thousands of dark-bellied brent geese arrive from Russia to spend the winter on the flats, which are also frequented by bar-tailed godwit, grey plover, red knot, oystercatcher and redshank. For curlew, dunlin and shelduck, the site is of national importance. In winter, hen harriers can be seen foraging, and a wide range of plants and invertebrates thrive there.

Other birds which use the island for breeding include avocet, common tern, little tern, Sandwich tern and ringed plover. During the winter months, in excess of 100,000 waterfowl have been reported. The avocet population is the second largest in the United Kingdom. The Foulness SSSI has been designated as a Special Protection Area for Birds under the EC Birds Directive, and is also a Ramsar site under the Ramsar Convention because of its importance as a wetland.

== Foulness Heritage Centre ==
The island's heritage centre was established in 2002 in the old primary school at Churchend. The conversion was made possible by an "Awards for All" grant, funding from QinetiQ and a donation from the ‘Bishop of Bradwell's Fund. It opened to the public in February 2003. It is run by volunteers from the Foulness Conservation and Archaeological Society and acts as a museum with displays of archaeological artefacts and memorabilia as well as documents and photographs. In 2003 it was a runner up in the annual MOD award for the best conservation projects across the entire defence estate, the Sanctuary Award. It closed to visitors during the winter of 2005/6 for a reorganisation of its displays to include newly donated items. It is open to visitors on the afternoon of the first Sunday of each month from April to October.
