= Great Wakering =

Village in Essex, England

Coordinates: 51.5516°N 0.8165°E

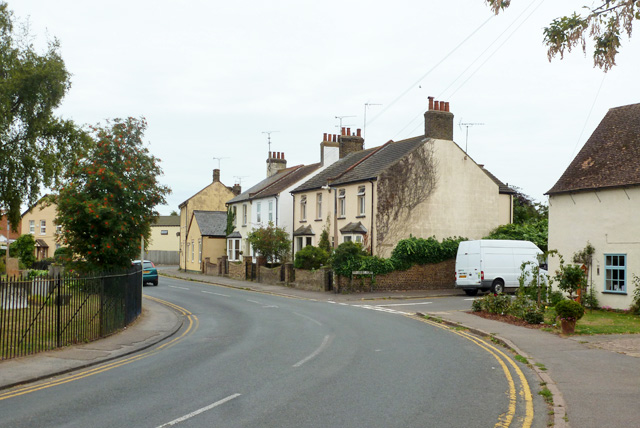
- Houses on New Road, Great Wakering

- Location within Essex
- Population: 6,037 (Parish, 2021); 6,775 (Built up area, 2021)
- OS grid reference: TQ952874
- District: Rochford
- Shire county: Essex
- Region: East
- Country: England
- Sovereign state: United Kingdom
- Post town: Southend-on-Sea
- Postcode district: SS3
- Dialling code: 01702
- Police: Essex
- Fire: Essex
- Ambulance: East of England
- UK Parliament: Rochford and Southend East

Great Wakering is a village and civil parish in the Rochford District of Essex, England. It is approximately 4 miles (6 km) east of Southend-on-Sea, its post town. Great Wakering consists mainly of two roads: the High Street, which runs from the junction of Star Lane, and New Road, which begins outside St Nicholas' Parish Church and runs down to the bridges for Foulness Island. At the 2021 census the parish had a population of 6,037, and the Great Wakering built up area as defined by the Office for National Statistics (which extends beyond the parish boundary to include Little Wakering and Barling) had a population of 6,775.

== History ==
The meaning of the name Wakering is unclear. The most accepted theory as to the name Wakering is that it is the name of an east Saxon tribe called the "Waeccer" as the suffix "-ing" has Saxon origins

According to a medieval tradition, Wakering (probably Great Wakering) was the site of a monastery during the 7th century AD. Two Christian cousins of King Ecgberht of Kent, named Æthelred and Æthelberht, were murdered at Eastry, a royal dwelling in the Kingdom of Kent, during King Ecgberht's reign (664–673). They were prevented by a miracle from being buried at Canterbury, and were taken instead to an existing monastery at Wakering in the Kingdom of Essex and enshrined there as saints. Ecgberht's brother and successor, King Hlothhere of Kent, is said by William of Malmesbury to have ridiculed the idea of their sanctity.

In Saxon times, Wakering appears to have formed a vill. By the time of the Domesday Book in 1086, the vill had fragmented into two manors, listed as Wachering in the Rochford Hundred of Essex. Both manors were held by Swein of Essex in 1086. The book itself does not distinguish between Great Wakering and Little Wakering, but historians have deduced that the manor worth £10 per year was Great Wakering and the manor worth £4 per year was Little Wakering.

No priest or church is mentioned at either of the Wakering manors in the Domesday Book, but each became a parish. The oldest parts of Great Wakering's Church of England parish church, dedicated to St Nicholas, date from around 1100. The board of rectors or vicars inside begins in the year 1200 with simply "Robert", and the next incumbent equally simply named "Peter". This church is one of the three oldest churches in south-east Essex As well as the parish church, the village also has a United Reformed Church in Chapel Lane, a Methodist church, and an Evangelical (formerly Peculiar People) church on Great Wakering High Street.

Great Wakering has many community links to the Ministry of Defence-governed Foulness Island. The village was badly hit during the North Sea flood of 1953 and locals fear a re-occurrence of the devastation now that tidal levels are rising and flood defences eroding. Of architectural interest is an old brickworks site (now partly demolished) at Star Lane, which was once served by an industrial narrow-gauge railway, the remains of which can still be seen in the bushes. Brick-making was once the main industry in Wakering. The factory finally closed in 1991, but the four towers remained a focal point on the horizon until September 2007, when the towers were demolished. In 2016, planning permission was granted to build new housing on the site.

Much of the land area around Great Wakering is closed to the public as it forms part of a Ministry of Defence (MOD) firing range – the "New Ranges". When firing is not taking place, however, the MOD beach at Wakering Stairs can be accessed via a rough road at Landwick security check-in. It is also possible to go over the MOD land and walk across the range from Cupid's Corner to follow a muddy track to the seawall which offers great views over the Maplin Sands. The MOD beach is a great spot for watching Brent geese and waders. There is much military debris around the area such as old firing targets, railway tracks, a lookout tower and several ruined batteries. There is also access here to the tidal path The Broomway, which leads to Fisherman's Head on Foulness Island.

== Sport and leisure ==
The local football team Great Wakering Rovers play in the Isthmian League First Division North. Their home ground is Burroughs Park.

Fairfax Saxons FC is a Great Wakering-based football club set up to raise awareness of men's health and to promote the community and local businesses via the medium of football. They play in the Southend Borough Combination Veterans League. This covers the Southend and surrounding areas. Home games are played at The Wakering Recreation Ground. It is a Sunday League set up. As a club, they train every Thursday and on Sunday when there is no game on. They welcome new players and hope to expand to create more teams within the club.

== Notable people ==
- Les Stubbs - footballer for Southend United F.C. and Chelsea F.C.
- Peter Sampson - footballer for Bristol Rovers F.C.
- Alan McCormack - footballer for Brentford F.C.
- Sir Alan Orr – Lord Justice of Appeal
- Ryan Peniston - professional tennis player
- Robin Trower - English rock guitarist

== Gallery ==
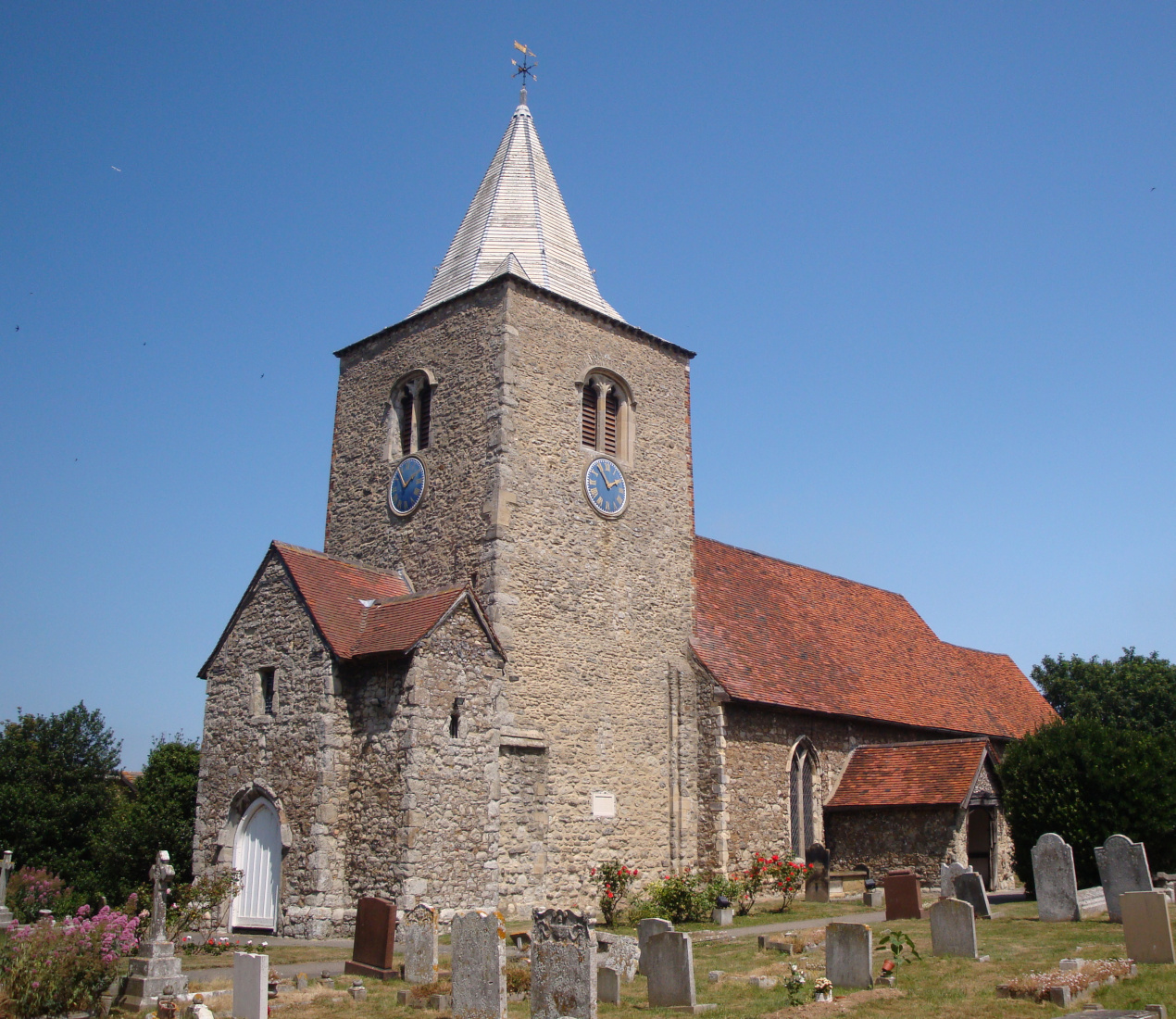
St Nicholas' Church, Great Wakering

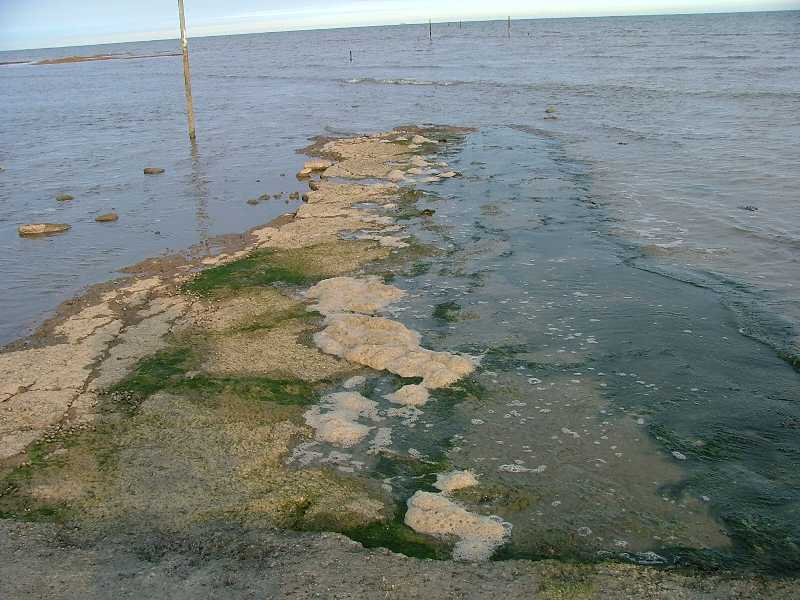
The Broomway, a tidal path said to pre-date the Romans is a treacherous walk between Great Wakering and Foulness and was once the only route between the two places.

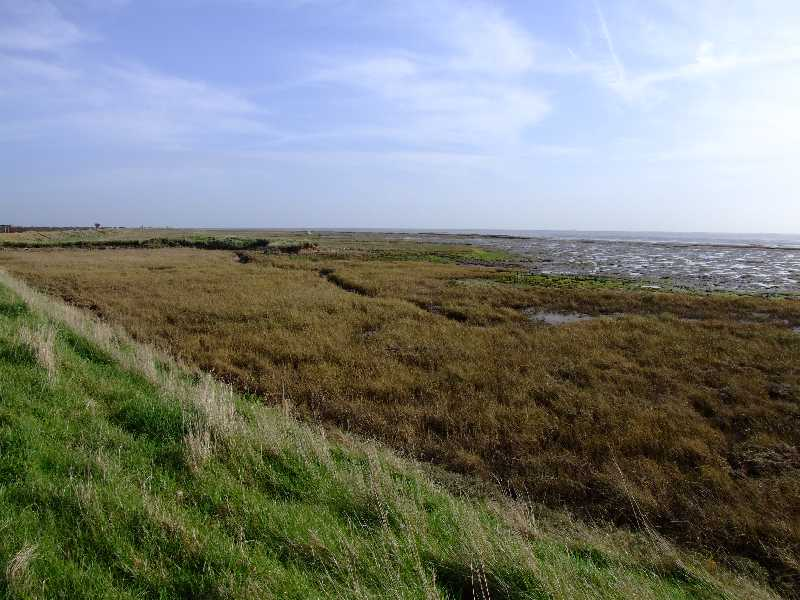
Marshland in front of the coast path behind Great Wakering New Ranges. This area is known locally as the Black Grounds. An old military lookout tower called 'X1' can be seen on the horizon.

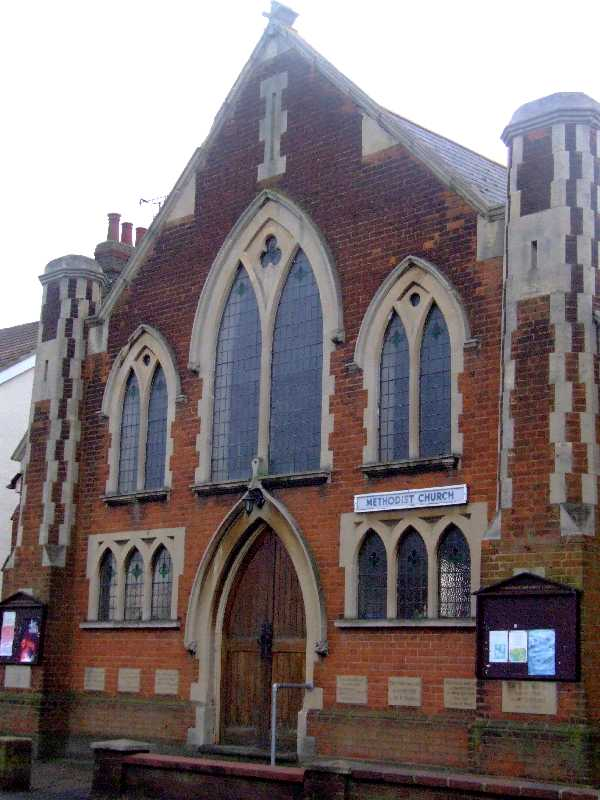
Methodist church on Great Wakering High Street

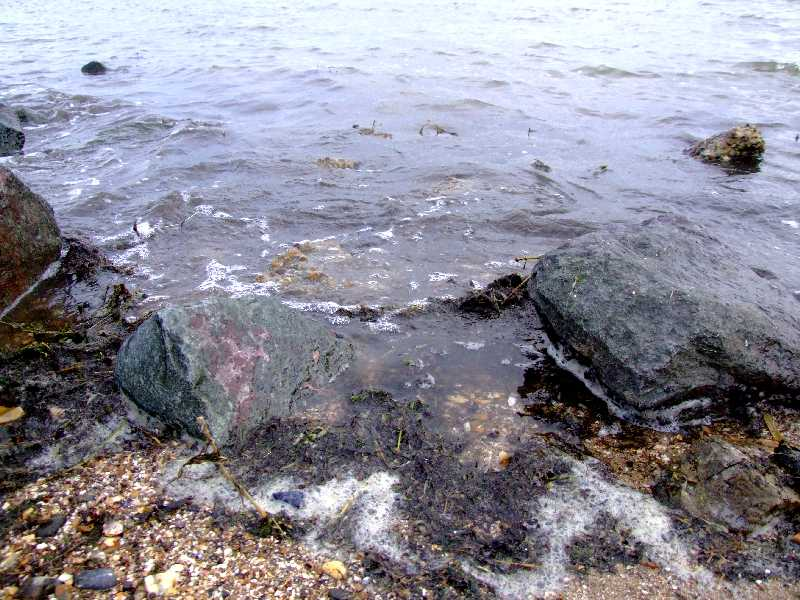
This beach is called the Wakering Stairs and belongs to the Ministry of Defence and can be accessed at their discretion. It is full of rocks and military debris.
