= New England Island =

Island in Essex, England

Coordinates: 51.57426°N 0.84872°E

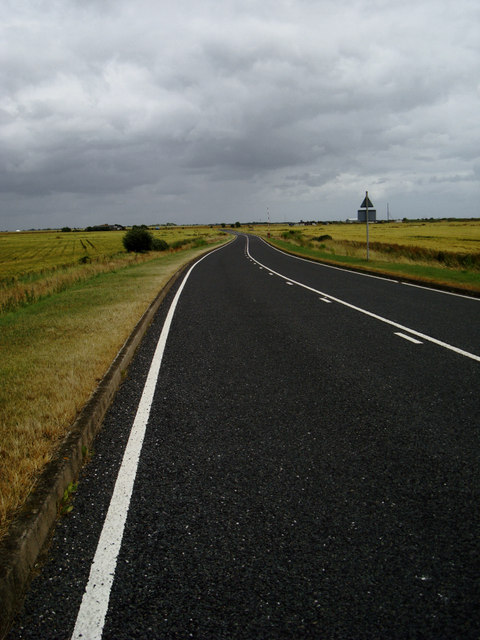
The road over the island

New England Island is an uninhabited island in Essex, England. One road crosses the island, connecting it with bridges to Foulness and to the mainland via Havengore Island.

Formerly used as pasture for livestock, the low-lying island is protected by levees and has been owned by the Ministry of Defence since the early 20th century.
