= Grade II* listed buildings in Rochford (district) =

There are over 20,000 Grade II* listed buildings in England. This page is a list of these buildings in the district of Rochford in Essex.

== Rochford ==
| Name | Location | Type | Completed (Note: The date given is the date used by Historic England as significant for the initial building or that of an important part in the structure's description.) | Date designated | Grid ref. (Note: The grid reference is based on the British national grid reference system, sometimes known as OSGB36, used by the Ordnance Survey.) Geo-coordinates | Entry number (Note: The "List Entry Number" is a unique number assigned to each listed building and scheduled monument by Historic England.) | Image |
|---|---|---|---|---|---|---|---|
| Church of St Andrew | Ashingdon, Rochford | Church | 1020 | 27 July 1959 | TQ8658793601; 51°36′37″N 0°41′36″E | 1112648 | Church of St Andrew More images |
| Church of All Saints | Barling Magna, Rochford | Parish Church | 12th century | 27 July 1959 | TQ9320489713; 51°34′23″N 0°47′12″E | 1365617 | Church of All Saints More images |
| Church of St Mary the Virgin | Little Wakering, Barling Magna, Rochford | Parish Church | 12th century | 27 July 1959 | TQ9345588326; 51°33′38″N 0°47′22″E | 1147397 | Church of St Mary the Virgin More images |
| Little Wakering Hall | Little Wakering, Barling Magna, Rochford | House | 16th century | 27 July 1959 | TQ9412788429; 51°33′41″N 0°47′57″E | 1147384 | Little Wakering Hall More images |
| Church of St Nicholas | Canewdon, Rochford | Parish Church | 14th century | 27 July 1959 | TQ8968894541; 51°37′04″N 0°44′19″E | 1147539 | Church of St Nicholas More images |
| Lambourne Hall | Canewdon, Rochford | Farmhouse | Late 13th century | 4 December 1951 | TQ9130994259; 51°36′53″N 0°45′43″E | 1308456 | Lambourne Hall More images |
| Church of St Nicholas | Great Wakering, Rochford | Parish Church | c. 1100 | 27 July 1959 | TQ9496287562; 51°33′12″N 0°48′39″E | 1322393 | Church of St Nicholas More images |
| Church of St Mary the Virgin | Hawkwell, Rochford | Parish Church | 14th century | 27 July 1959 | TQ8602891862; 51°35′42″N 0°41′04″E | 1322323 | Church of St Mary the Virgin More images |
| Church of St Peter and St Paul | Hockley, Rochford | Parish Church | Pre 12th century | 27 July 1959 | TQ8259593400; 51°36′35″N 0°38′08″E | 1112667 | Church of St Peter and St Paul More images |
| Church of St Peter | Paglesham, Rochford | Parish Church | 12th century | 27 July 1959 | TQ9260593059; 51°36′12″N 0°46′47″E | 1112610 | Church of St Peter More images |
| Church of Holy Trinity | Rayleigh, Rochford | Parish Church | 12th century | 27 August 1957 | TQ8081490925; 51°35′17″N 0°36′31″E | 1112676 | Church of Holy Trinity More images |
| Church of St Andrew | Rochford | Parish Church | Earlier | 27 July 1959 | TQ8718290283; 51°34′49″N 0°42′01″E | 1112585 | Church of St Andrew More images |
| Purpose Built Barn with Horse Engine approx. 60 Metres South West of Doggetts Farmhouse and attached to Barn | Rochford | Horse Engine | EARLY/MID 19th century | 13 January 1988 | TQ8802491884; 51°35′40″N 0°42′47″E | 1322417 | Upload Photo |
| 17 South Street | Rochford | House | 1440 +/- 80 years | 27 July 1959 | TQ8766990410; 51°34′53″N 0°42′26″E | 1112559 | 17 South Street |
| Church of St Mary and All Saints | Great Stambridge, Rochford | Parish Church | Pre-Conquest | 27 July 1959 | TQ8945490736; 51°35′01″N 0°43′59″E | 1168425 | Church of St Mary and All Saints More images |
| Beauchamps | Sutton, Rochford | House | Later | 4 December 1951 | TQ9075288409; 51°33′44″N 0°45′02″E | 1112579 | Beauchamps More images |
| Church of All Saints | Sutton, Rochford | Parish Church | C14/C15 | 27 July 1959 | TQ8878589231; 51°34′13″N 0°43′22″E | 1113355 | Church of All Saints More images |
