= John Harriott =

John Harriott may refer to:

- John Harriott (sailor), English sailor involved in founding the Marine Police Force
- John Edward Harriott, fur trader for the Hudson's Bay Company
- John Staples Harriott, British army officer in the service of the East India Company
