= John Harriott (sailor) =

English seafarer

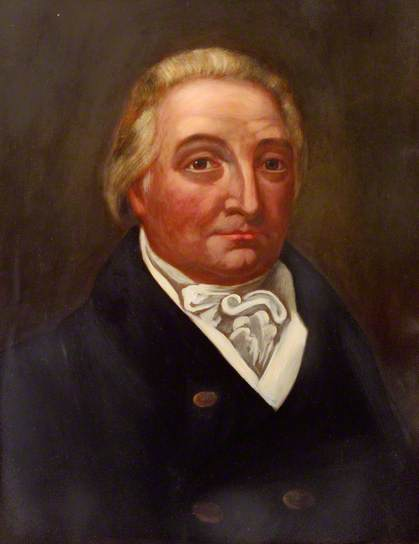
John Harriott in 1815

John Harriott (1745–1817) was an English seafarer, now known for his part in founding the Marine Police Force. He was resident magistrate at the Thames police-court from 1798 to 1816.

== Life ==
Harriott was born at Great Stambridge, near Rochford, Essex, where his father, who had been in the Royal Navy and merchant marine, had settled a couple of years earlier. After a little schooling he was placed in the navy, served in the West Indies and the Levant, and was shipwrecked on the Mewstone Rock.

Harriott served in the Seven Years' War, under Admiral George Pocock at the Battle of Havana (1762), and during the recapture of Newfoundland. After the peace of 1763 he entered the merchant service, went up the Baltic Sea, and, as mate, made voyages in the American and West Indian trade. He spent several months among Native Americans in 1766; and then returned home.

== In the service of the East India Company ==
In 1768 Harriott received a military appointment in the East Indies. He states that he arrived at Madras in time to take part in the conclusion of General Smith's operations against Hyder Ali. Subsequently he was posted to a sepoy battalion in the Northern Circars, where he also did duty as deputy judge-advocate and acting chaplain for some time. A matchlock wound in the leg, received when in command of four companies of sepoys sent against a rajah in the Golconda district, unfitted him for further active service. After visits to Sumatra and the Cape of Good Hope, he returned home.

== Projector in England ==
Harriott married, and after trying his hand at underwriting and the wine trade, settled down as a farmer at his native place in Essex. In 1781–2 he reclaimed from the sea Rushley Island of two hundred acres, between Great Wakering and Foulness, which had several feet of water on it at spring-tides, by enclosing it with an embankment three miles in length. He then erected farm-buildings and sank wells on it. For this project the Society of Arts awarded him a gold medal; also a prize for an improved road harrow for levelling ruts. Harriott at this time was a surveyor of roads and an Essex magistrate as well as a farmer.

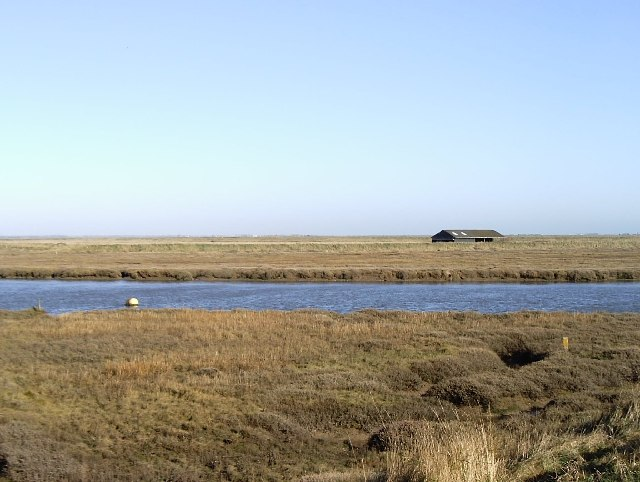
Rushley Island

In 1790 the destruction of his farm by fire brought Harriott to the verge of ruin. He called a meeting of his creditors, who behaved well; emigrated with his family to the United States, where he remained in an unsettled position for some years, and then returned home again in 1795.

On 31 October 1797 Harriott, then described as of Prescott Street, Goodman's Fields, in the county of Middlesex, patented an improvement in ships' pumps, which was adopted in the navy, and set up a small factory. He subscribed to William Pitt's loyalty loan, and suggested improvements in the organisation of volunteer corps and sea and river fencibles.

== Law enforcement in the Port of London ==
Around 1797 Harriott prepared a scheme for the establishment of a river police force for the Port of London. On 30 October 1797 he addressed a letter on the subject to the Duke of Portland, but, with no support from the Lord Mayor of London, it was an introduction to Patrick Colquhoun that helped the push the scheme through. At midsummer 1798 the Marine Police Force was established. Colquhoun was appointed receiver, with an office at Westminster, with three special justices, one of whom, Harriott, was to reside at the police office in Wapping.

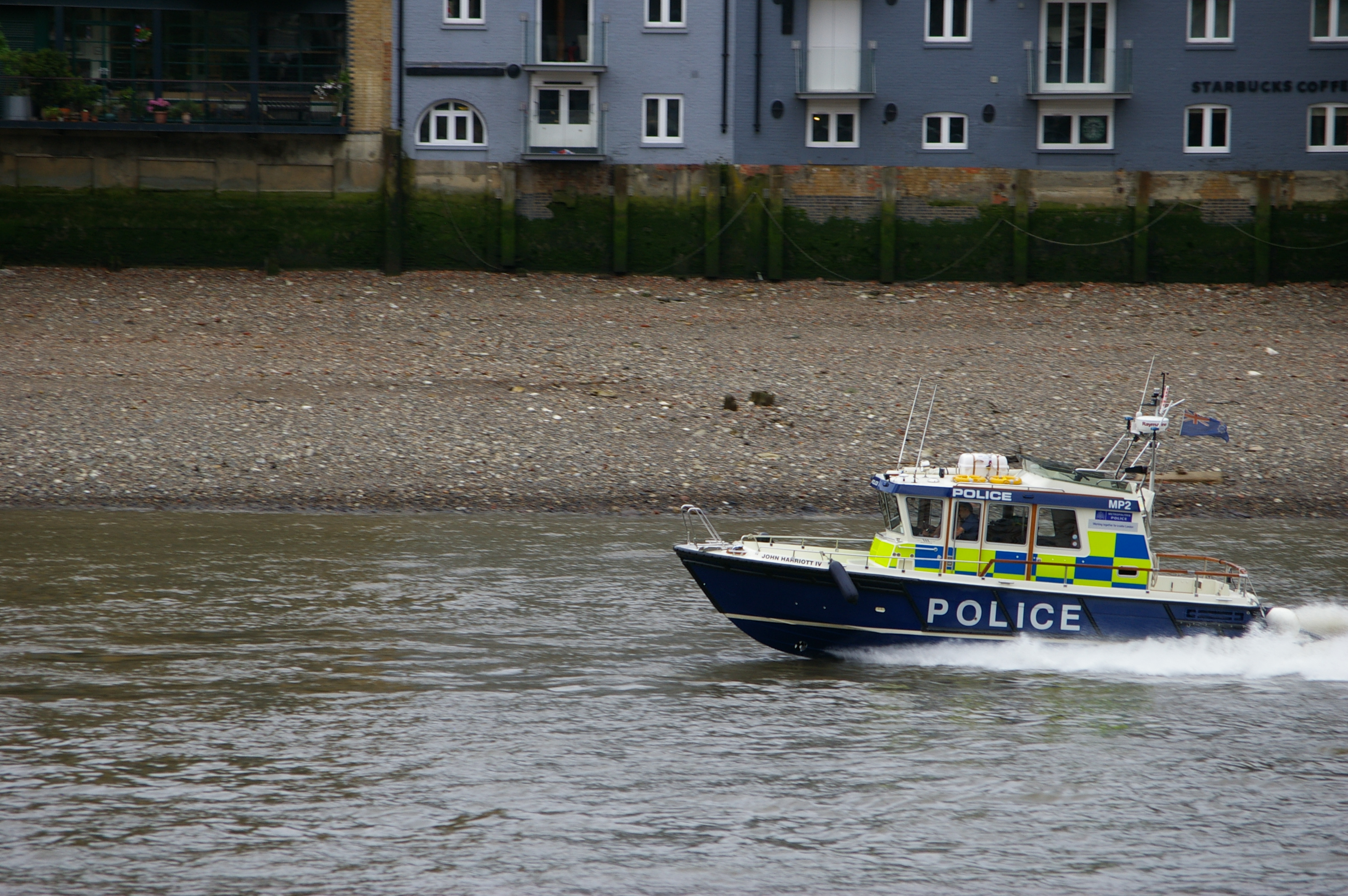
Police boat John Harriott IV, 2012 photo

Police cutters patrolled the River Thames. Crime was reduced but the force was initially unpopular. Violence was used, and later in 1809 charges of malversation were brought against Harriott by clerks in his office. The case was thrown out by the King's Bench in 1810.

== Last years ==
Harriott continued his duties until his health broke down some nine months before his death. He died at Burr Street, Spitalfields, on 22 April 1817 and was buried at St Mary and All Saints Church, Stambridge, in Rochford, Essex.

== Works ==
Harriott published:

- Tables for the Improvement of Landed Estates, and for Increasing the Growth of Timber thereon;
- An Address at a Parish Meeting at St. John's, Wapping, on the formation of an Armed Association, London, 1803;
- The Religion of Philosophy as contradistinguished from Modern French Philosophy, and as an Antidote to its pernicious effects lately so evident in the prevalence of Assassination and Suicide, pp. xvii, 152, London, 1812.

Struggles through Life, London, 3 vols., his autobiography, went through several editions, the last containing a chapter on the Abuses of Private Madhouses.

Harriott was also a patentee of the following inventions:

- Patent 2197, 31 Oct. 1797, cog-wheel, crab, or capstan, with gear, to work ships' pumps, and for propelling;
- 2610, 13 April 1802 (with Thomas Strode, smith, of Wapping), engine for raising weights and working mills;
- 2713, 13 June 1803 (with Hurry & Crispin of Gosport), improved method of making and working windlasses;
- 3130, 10 May 1808, fire-escapes.

== Family ==
Harriott was three times married, and left a widow and several children and grandchildren. In 1797 the East India Company gave appointments to two of his sons: John Staples Harriott, afterwards a colonel of Bengal infantry, who lost a leg at the battle of Delhi in 1803, when serving under Lord Lake, and Thomas Harriott, lieutenant in the Indian navy, who commanded the Psyche gun-brig at the taking of Java.
