= St Mary and All Saints, Great Stambridge =

Parish church of Great Sambridge, United Kingdom

Coordinates: 51.5836°N 0.7332°E

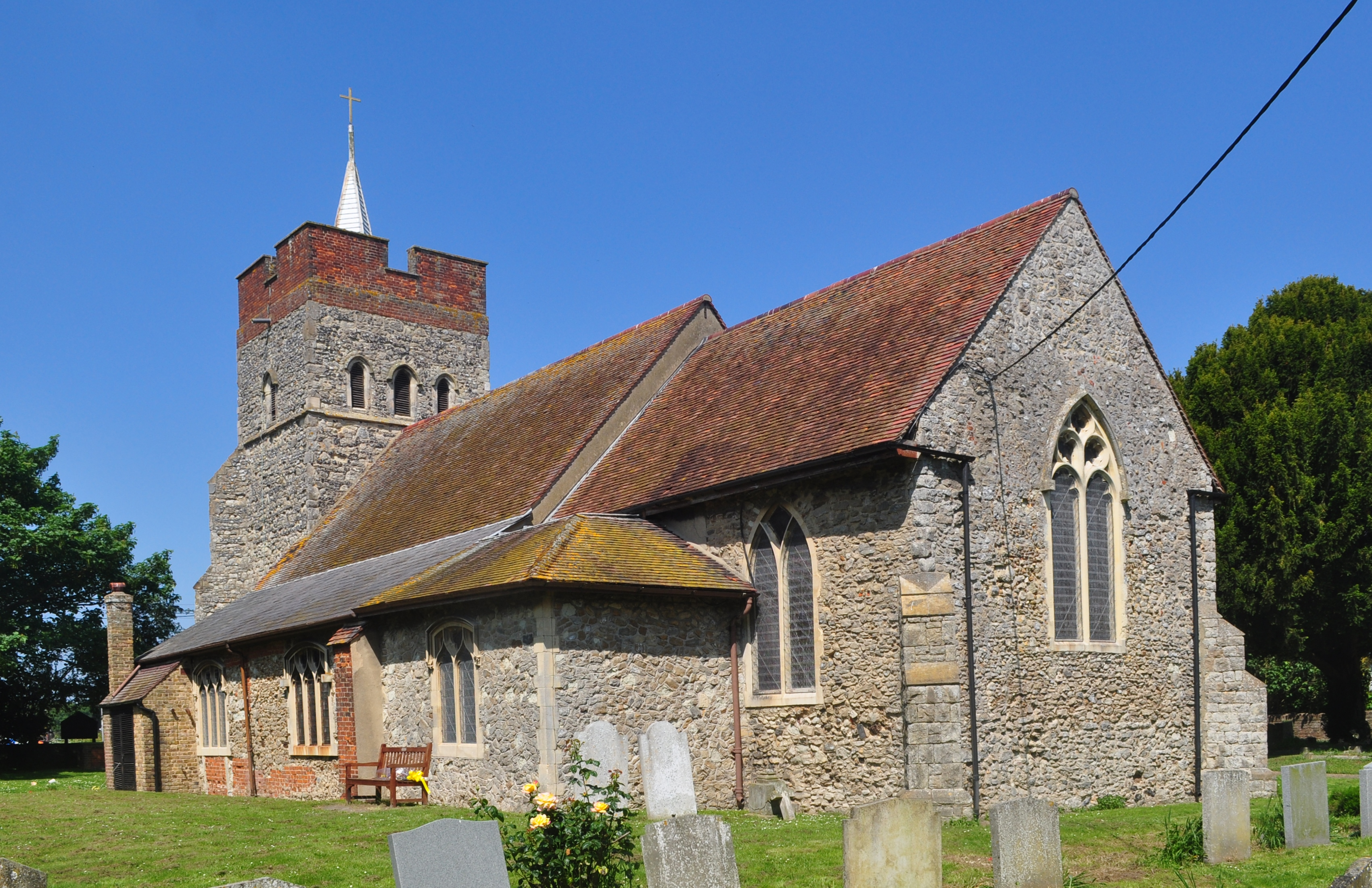
The church in 2024

St Mary and All Saints is the parish church of Great Stambridge, and since 1888 Little Stambridge, both in Essex, United Kingdom. The earliest parts of the church, which comprise parts of the nave and chancel, were built before the Norman Conquest of 1066. Major additions then came with the first part of the west tower and the north porch in the 1400s, the latter two parts of the west tower in the 1700s, and the organ chamber and north vestry in the 1800s.

The church underwent a renovation in 1881 in which the roofs were replaced and the arcade rebuilt. In 1888, Little Stambridge was merged into the parish; therefore, after that point, the church was the parish church for both settlements. In 1898 the number of bells in the tower increased from one to four. The church was awarded Grade II* listed status in 1959.

== History ==
Parts of the current nave and chancel of the church originate from before the Norman Conquest of 1066, with it described by some sources as Saxon. (Note: Whereas the 'Anglo-Saxons' refer to all Old English speakers in Britain before the Norman Conquest, meaning the church must be Anglo-Saxon by being built before 1066, 'Saxons' are one specific tribe of Germans who comprised part of the pre-Norman population.) According to the Rochford Town Team, the church is the only surviving Saxon church building in Rochford District, but other later churches were built on the sites of demolished Saxon churches.

The south aisle was added in the 1300s, and the chancel underwent significant alteration in the 1200s and 1300s. In the 1400s the west tower and probably the north porch were added. The next additions were in the 1800s when the north vestry and south organ chamber were built, the former replacing the chancel's arch, and other parts of the church were renovated.

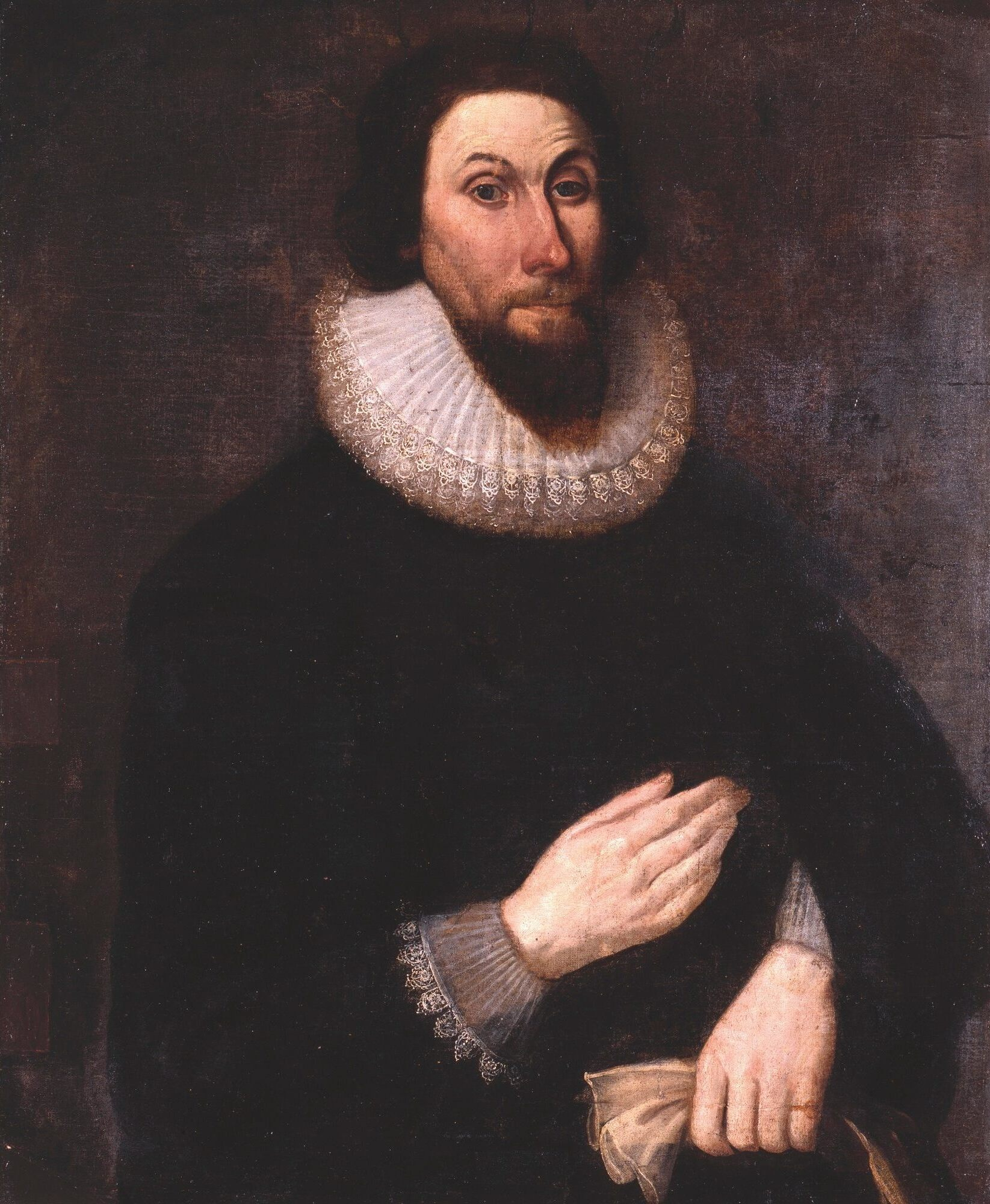
American settler John Winthrop, who married at the church in 1605

On the west wall, there is a memorial to John Harriot from Broomhills in Stambridge. There is also a brass memorial on the north wall to the marriage of John Winthrop and Mary Forth on 16 April 1605. In 1630, Winthrop emigrated to the Americas on the Arabella and later became a significant figure in and many-times governor of the Massachusetts Bay Colony.

Robert Jacomb, at the time a tenant farmer, married Susan Kemp in the church on 29 March 1819. He would later become a gentleman after inheriting the Bardon Hall estate from a cousin, and had many influential descendants, including the railway engineers Robert Jacomb-Hood and John Wykeham Jacomb-Hood, and the artist George Percy Jacomb-Hood.

In 1881 the church underwent major renovation, under the guidance of rector George Wilson Keightley. The roofs of the nave and the chancel were replaced with higher-pitched ones; the arcade was rebuilt; and new wooden benches and desks were installed amongst other changes.

In 1888, based on the Union of Benefices Act 1860, the parishes of Great Stambridge and Little Stanbridge were merged; the church has been the parish church of both since at least 1893, when the parish population was 476. In 1898 the church gained three new bells with notes E, F♯, and G, and the framing needed to hold them; before then, the church only had one bell as of 1890.

The church was awarded Grade II* listed status by Historic England on 27 July 1959. (Note: According to Historic England, "Grade II* buildings are particularly important buildings of more than special interest".)

== Design ==
The church is built from a mix of brick, concretion, puddingstone, and rag-stone, with dressings made from stone. The roof is made from plain red roof tiles and is from the 1881 renovation, except the north porch, whose roof is from the 1400s. The relatively short spire is built with a clapboard design and sits atop the west tower. While many of the windows are older, the stained glass originates from the 1800s and the marble was replaced in the 1900s. The entire church has colourful 1800s tiled floors.

=== Chancel and nave ===
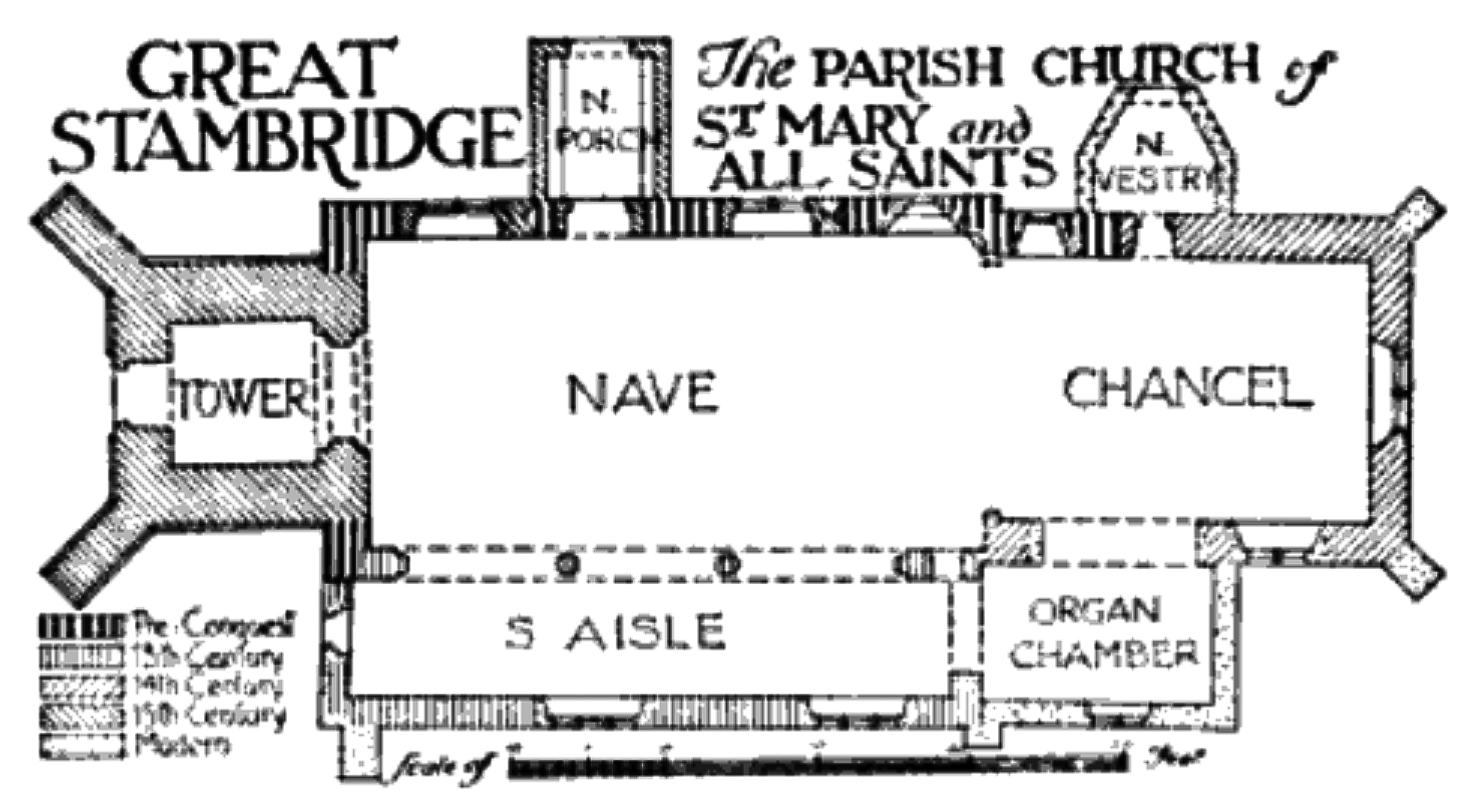
A plan of the church published by the Royal Commission on the Historical Monuments of England in 1916

The chancel has a mix of 1300s structures and 1800s tracery superimposed on its east wall. On its north wall, to the west of the doorway to the north vestry, there are the remains of an arch from before the Norman Conquest of 1066. The rest of the chancel is entirely from the 1800s. On the north side, on the chancel and the nave, there is a slight offset in the wall around 9 feet (2.7 m) from the ground. The arch and window on the south side are modern.

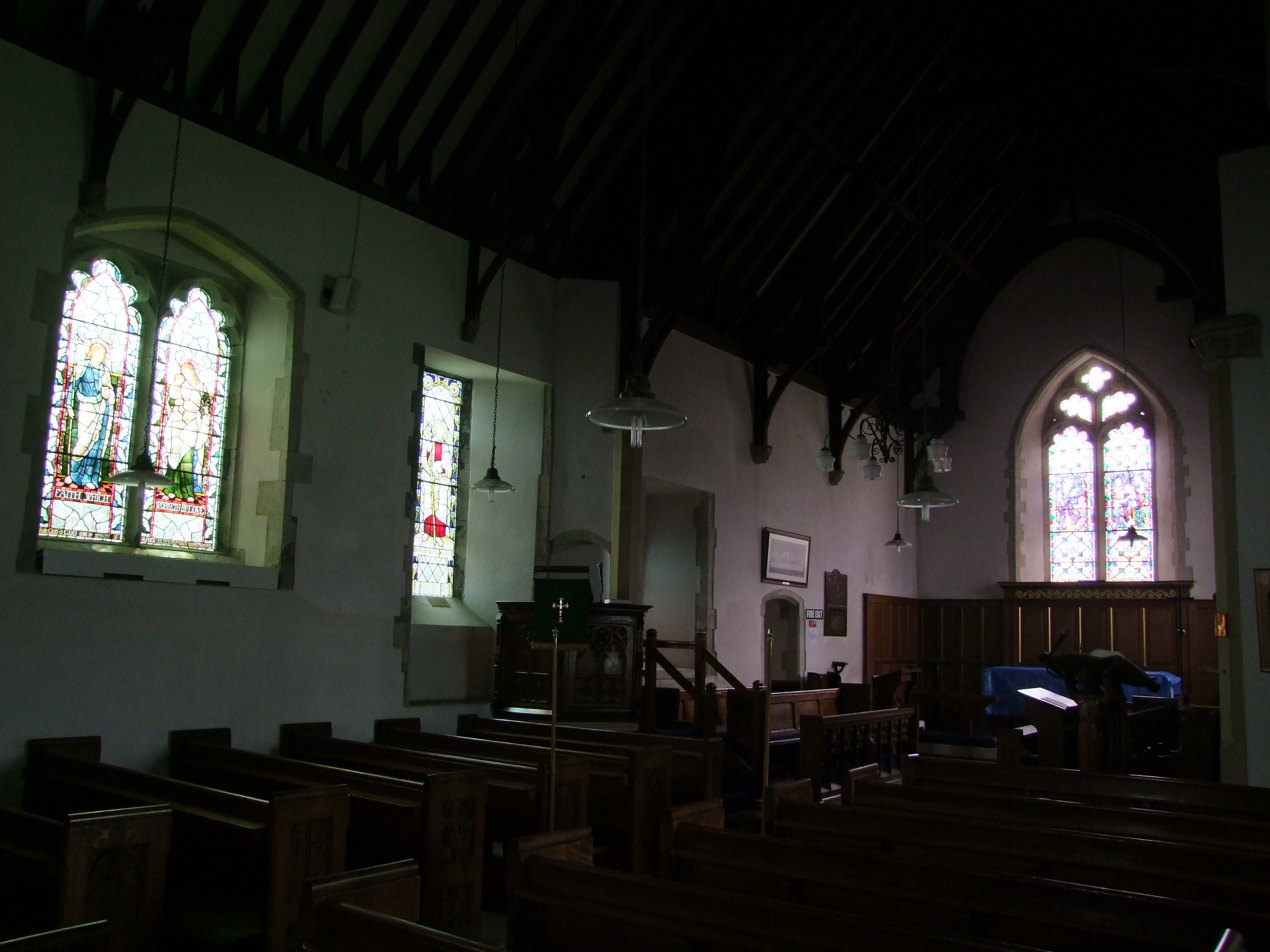
The interior north (left) and east (right) of the church, showing the chancel and nave

In the north wall of the nave there are two 1400s windows decorated with cinquefoil motifs, a late-1300s to early-1400s doorway, and then a 1200s window that has been significantly repaired since. The wall itself was built from rag-stone, in particular Kentish ragstone, and puddingstone before the Norman Conquest. The eastern wall is from the 1200s, and the southern and western walls from the 1400s; however, the southwest corner of the nave still keeps its pre-1066 wall made from the same materials as the northern wall.

The doorway from the nave, now to the north porch, was built in the 1300s, and the doorway into what is now the vestry room in 1350. In both the north wall of the nave and the east wall of the chancel, the windows are entirely modern except the splayed openings in the design of the wall above each window. On the north wall, there is an additional splayed opening between the two 1300s windows, and another splayed opening between the doorway to the north porch and the 1200s window, the latter of which has been filled in with concretion.

=== Later additions ===
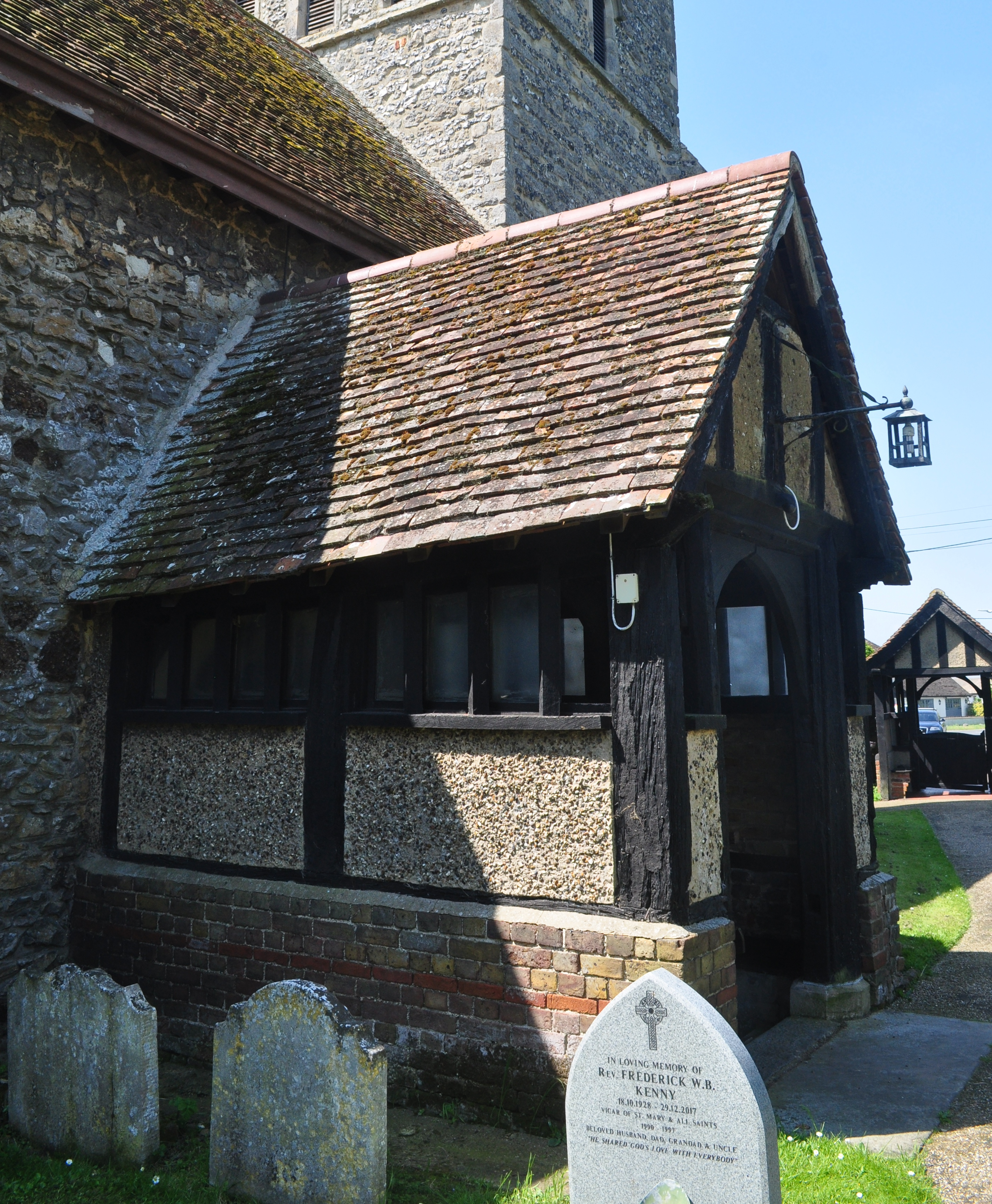
The north porch in front of the west tower

The north porch probably originates from the 1300s or 1400s, with its original structure a mix of brick and timber, but the external walls have been redone with modern bricks and plaster. The seats in the bays are made from stone and brick. The south aisle was partially refaced with cement, and its windows replaced after the 1700s. The arcade of pillars that separate it from the nave are from around 1300 and each arch has different levels of detail; these were rebuilt in the 1881 renovation.

The west tower is made from red bricks, stone, and flint, with its west window and door from the 1400s. The tower was built in three stages: the first part was built in the reign of Edward III, in the years 1327–1377, with the main building material being clunch. The second and third stages took place in the 1700s, comprising one layer of brick, and one layer of flint and stone. The interior of the tower has been significantly restored since it was built. There is a bell chamber with windows in the south and east walls. In 1916, it was speculated there were further windows in the north and west walls, and a second in the east wall, but they were obscured by the ivy on the tower.

== See also ==
- Grade II* listed buildings in Rochford (district)
- Rochford Hall and ruins
- St Mary Magdalene, Great Burstead
