= Robert Jacomb-Hood =

British railway engineer (1822–1900)

Robert Jacomb-Hood MICE
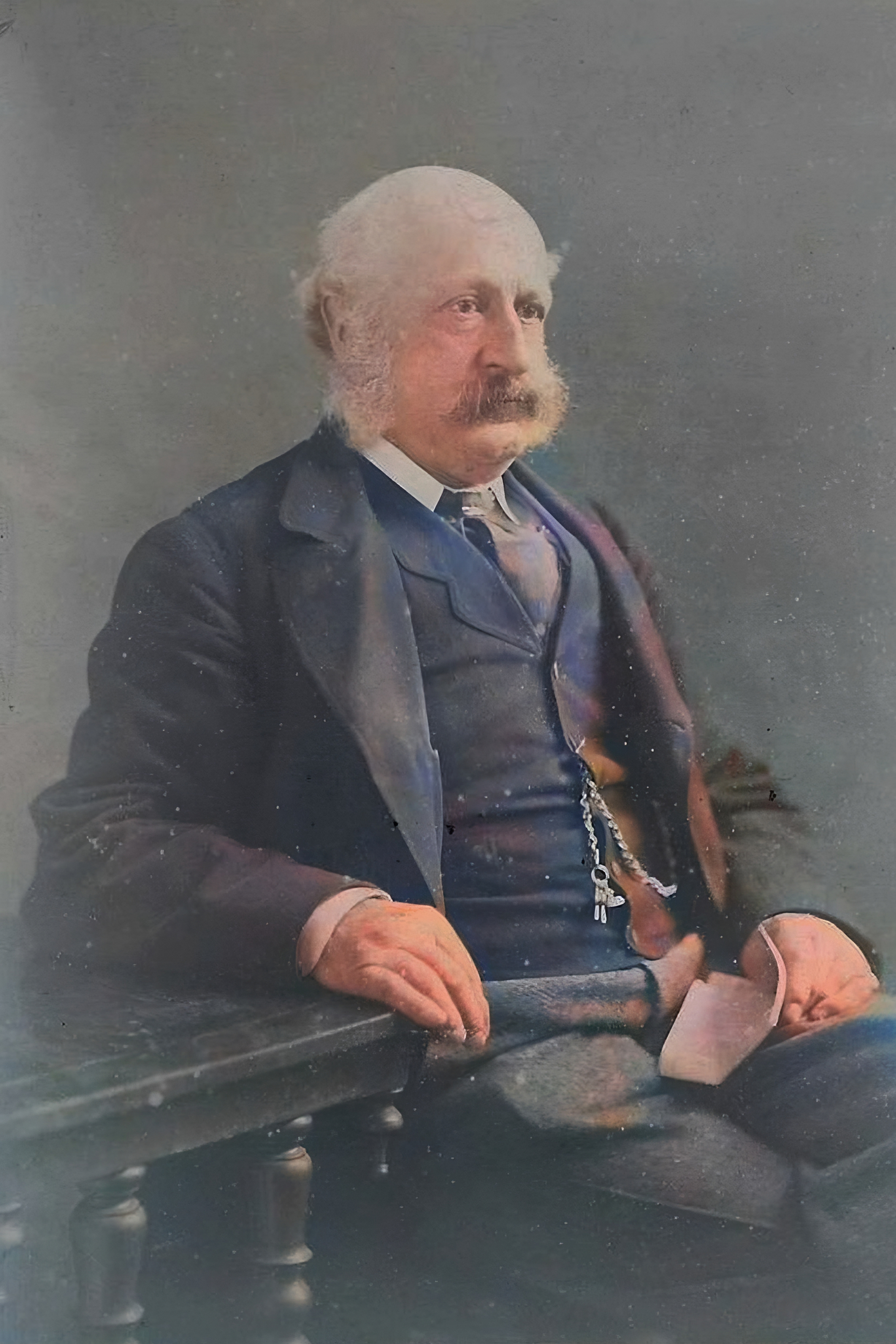
- Jacomb-Hood photographed in 1881
- Born: Robert Jacomb; 25 January 1822; Riseley, Bedfordshire, England
- Died: 10 May 1900 (aged 78); Tunbridge Wells, England
- Known for: Resident Engineer of the London, Brighton, and South Coast Railway
- Spouses: Jane Littlewood (m. 1852; died 1869) Elizabeth Thornton (m. 1871; died 1875)
- Children: 9, including George Percy Jacomb-Hood and John Wykeham Jacomb-Hood
- Awards: Telford Medal

Robert Jacomb-Hood (Note: His name is sometimes left unhyphenated as Robert Jacomb Hood.) (born Robert Jacomb, 25 January 1822 – 10 May 1900) was a British civil engineer who rose to prominence as the first Resident Engineer of the London, Brighton and South Coast Railway (LB&SCR), a position he held from the company's formation in 1846 until 1860. During this time, he was responsible for projects including London Victoria station, London Bridge station, and Crystal Palace railway station, as well as a large number of branch lines across southern England.

Born to a working-class family in Bedfordshire, Jacomb-Hood saw his family finances drastically improve after his father inherited an estate from his cousin in 1833. Jacomb-Hood attended Christ's Hospital before being removed in favour of private tuition. He began studying Law at the University of Cambridge, but quickly dropped out to become a railway engineer instead, and was trained under the guidance of George W. Buck and William Baker. He was selected as the first Resident Engineer of the LB&SCR in 1846, a mere five years after entering the industry. The company's finances were tumultuous: some years there were strong gains and others were so poor that Jacomb-Hood narrowly escaped being dismissed. Nevertheless, his personal finances grew steadily, and he was elected a Member of the Institution of Civil Engineers in 1847.

After transitioning to practising privately in 1860, he began partnering with a variety of engineers and architects, including Charles Driver, George Parker Bidder, and his cousin William Jacomb. He also expanded his work outside of railway engineering, working on projects such as the National Gallery and the Portcreek Viaduct. The death of his first wife and the end of his joint practice with Jacomb motivated him to enter semi-retirement. As part of this, he switched his focus from designing and constructing projects in the UK to joining companies' boards of directors and taking up international opportunities, such as the Alabama Great Southern Railroad, whose overarching company he helped to create, and whose board he sat on between 1877 and 1886. He was also a director of the Crystal Palace Company between 1869 and 1879, having contributed to their work since 1859.

In 1883, he returned to the LB&SCR as a member of the board; by this time, he was barely working and was instead spending most of his time travelling the world. He slowly left the companies of which he had been a board member; his last known involvement with a civil engineering project was in 1894, but he continued assisting the LB&SCR until his death in 1900, aged 78. He also saw academic success: he was awarded two of the Institution of Civil Engineers' accolades in 1850 and 1858, respectively. The latter of these awards, the Telford Medal, was for a paper that was considered avant-garde in station design and railway engineering.

== Early life ==
=== Family ===
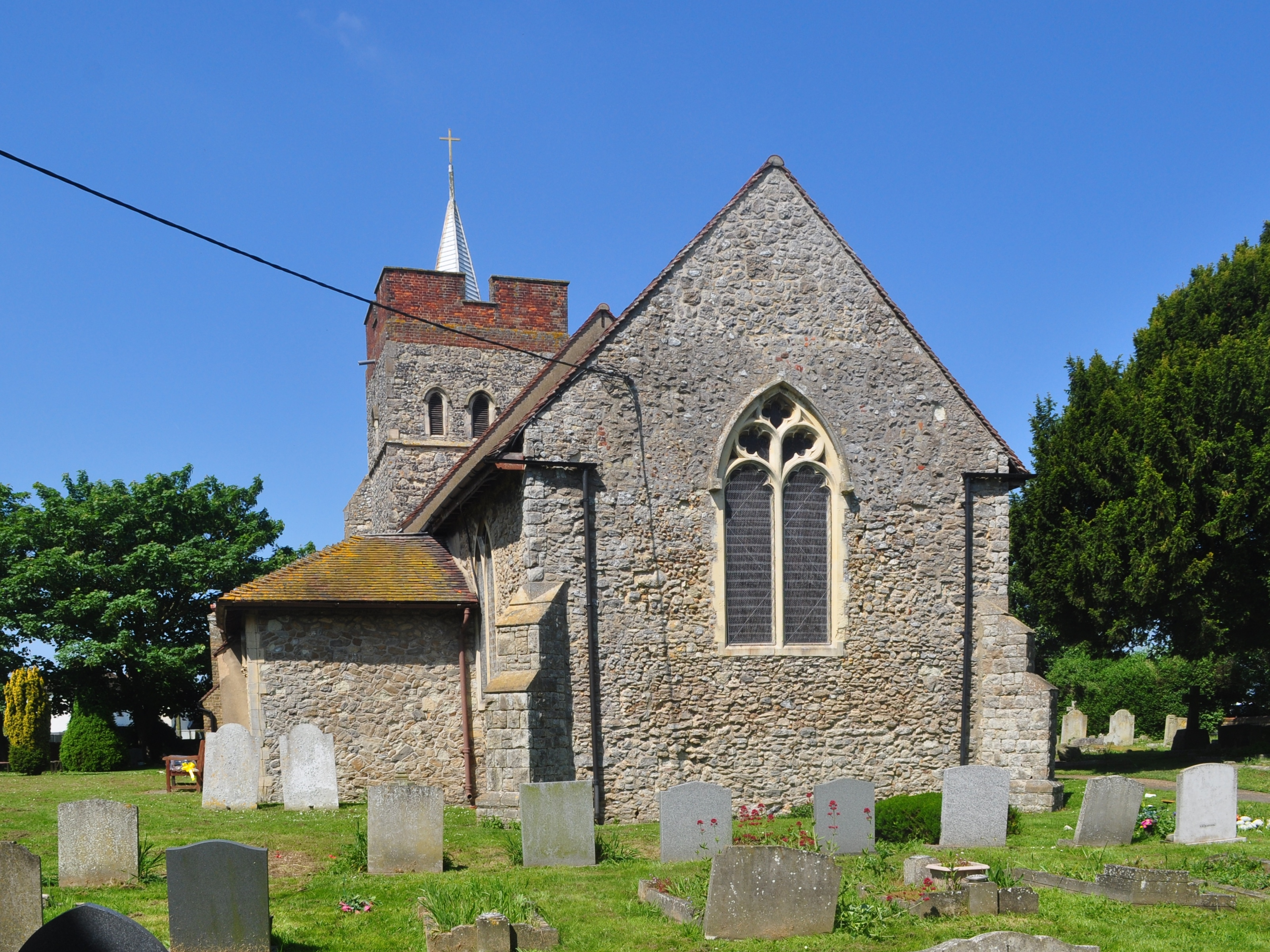
St Mary and All Saints church in Great Stambridge, where Jacomb-Hood's parents married.

Robert Jacomb-Hood was born Robert Jacomb on 25 January 1822 at The Lodge Farm in Riseley, Bedfordshire. He was baptised in Riseley on 21 February 1822. (Note: Jones, Clifford (ed.). Robert Jacomb-Hood. Christ's Hospital School London Archives. Accessed 25 June 2025.) He was the first of his parents' nine children; according to their marriage certificate, they had married on 29 March 1819 at St Mary and All Saints in Great Stambridge, Essex.

Jacomb-Hood's mother was Susan Jacomb-Hood (née Kemp), the daughter of John Kemp of Broomhills in Rochford, Essex. His mother's brother—George Tawke Kemp—owned the Beechhill estate, also situated in Rochford, and Kemp's son George was given the title Baron Rochdale on 14 February 1913. Jacomb-Hood's father was born Robert Jacomb. Hailing from Scarning, Norfolk, he was recorded as a tenant farmer on land belonging to John Russell, 6th Duke of Bedford in 1822.

Robert Jacomb's (Note: For clarity, this entire paragraph refers to the person born 'Robert Jacomb', who is the father of this article's subject, not the subject of the article himself.) cousin, the barrister William Hood, died in the 1830s. (Note: Various sources state 1832, 1833, and 1835.) Although Jacomb had no link to Hood's estate at Bardon Park in Bardon, Leicestershire, he was the last male member of Hood's family. He therefore inherited Bardon Park. The estate had been in the Hood family since the 1620s, and inheritance was conditioned on Jacomb taking the surname Hood; accordingly, both father and son became Robert Jacomb-Hood. Jacomb-Hood modified the estate by building a new Bardon Hall in 1835 and demolishing the old Bardon Hall building around 1840, which he had described in his memoirs as "too dilapidated for residence, and the situation was low, damp and unhealthy". He was accepted to the Worshipful Company of Fan Makers—one of the 113 livery companies of the City of London—on 9 January 1832.

=== Education ===
Jacomb-Hood (Note: Henceforth 'Robert Jacomb-Hood' and 'Jacomb-Hood' refer to the subject of this article, born 1822, not his father of the same name.) was first educated by a private tutor in Dereham, Norfolk, when he was aged seven. He then entered Christ's Hospital, a charity school (Note: Christ's hospital is also a public school—a type of fee-charging private school—but as a charity school does not charge admission.) in West Sussex. The application submitted to the school is dated December 1831; it reports that the father's income did "not exceed £100 per annum" (equating to a salary of below £9,000 in 2025), and that by this time Jacomb-Hood had three siblings. Jacomb-Hood was admitted on 13 January 1832, aged nine. His family did not pay for his education or any associated fees but rather he was sponsored. Jacomb-Hood started at the preparatory school in Hertford, Hertfordshire until 1834, after which he studied at the main school in Newgate Street, London.

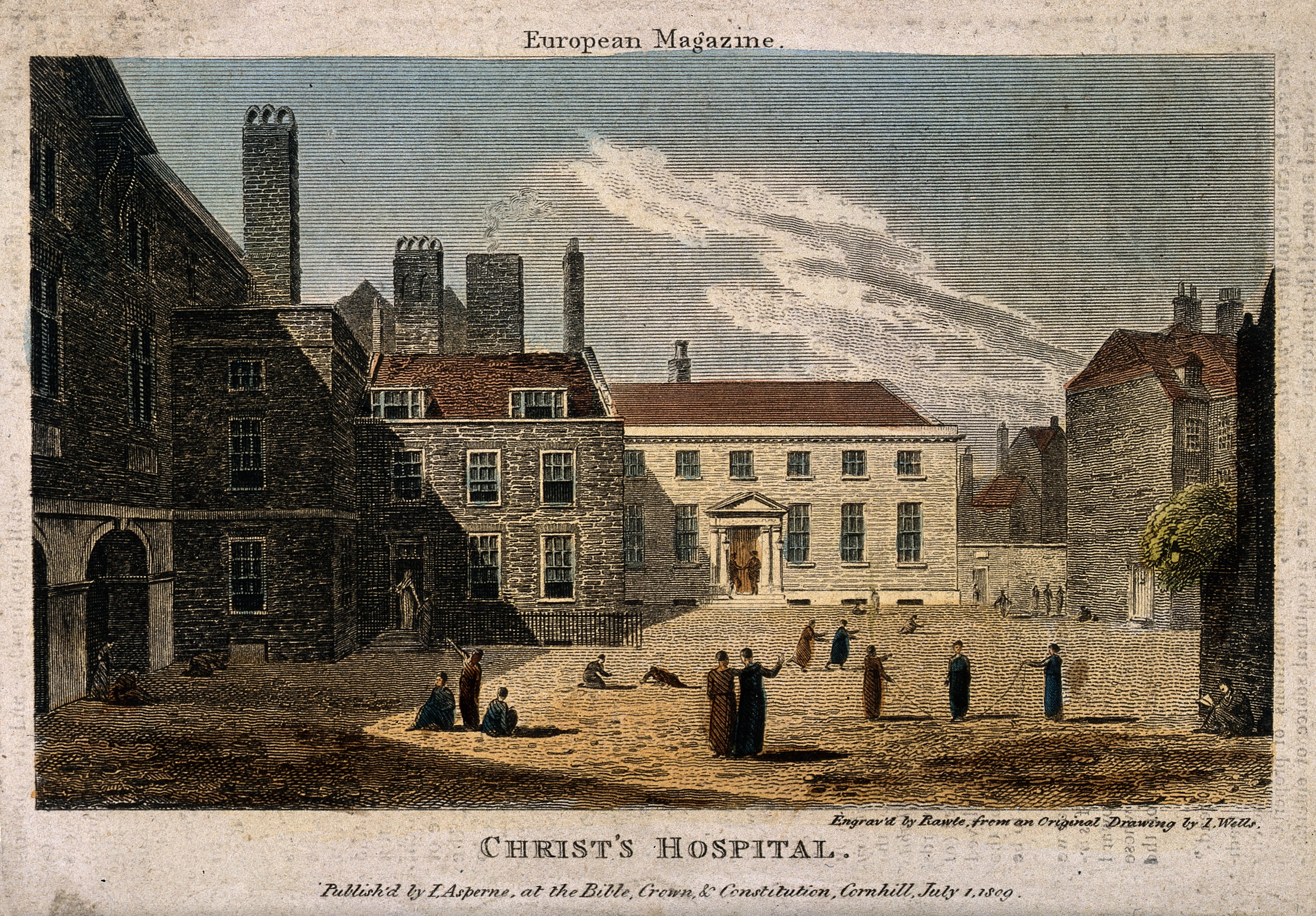
The old Christ's Hospital in Newgate in 1831, the same decade Jacomb-Hood studied there

According to the school archives, of the three departments at the school, Jacomb-Hood belonged to the Writing School, which was for children wanting to pursue financial or commercial work. There, he was ranked best out of 258 students for penmanship on 25 November 1834, for which he was awarded a golden pen, the school's equivalent of first prize. As a result of his father's inheritance of Bardon Park, and the consequential improvement to their finances, he was removed from the school in 1835, the school archives putting the precise date as 6 November. None of his siblings attended the school.

After leaving Christ's Hospital, Jacomb-Hood was educated by Reverend H. Richardson, the rector of Leire, Leicestershire. Jacomb-Hood's father was unhappy with the quality of instruction, however, and in 1836 moved his son to Wood & Throwgood School in Totteridge, Hertfordshire. By this time, the family was living in Bardon Hall, where the father was undertaking renovation works. Between 1839 and 1840, Jacomb-Hood was educated in Hathern, Leicestershire, as a precursor to him studying at the University of Cambridge. At the same time, the family moved to Cheltenham, Gloucestershire because of the preferential climate. In both locations, Jacomb-Hood witnessed railway construction: the Birmingham and Gloucester Railway in Cheltenham, and the Midland Counties Railway in Hathern. In his diaries, he recalls visiting the sites with his friends, and that they served as an inspiration for his choice of career.

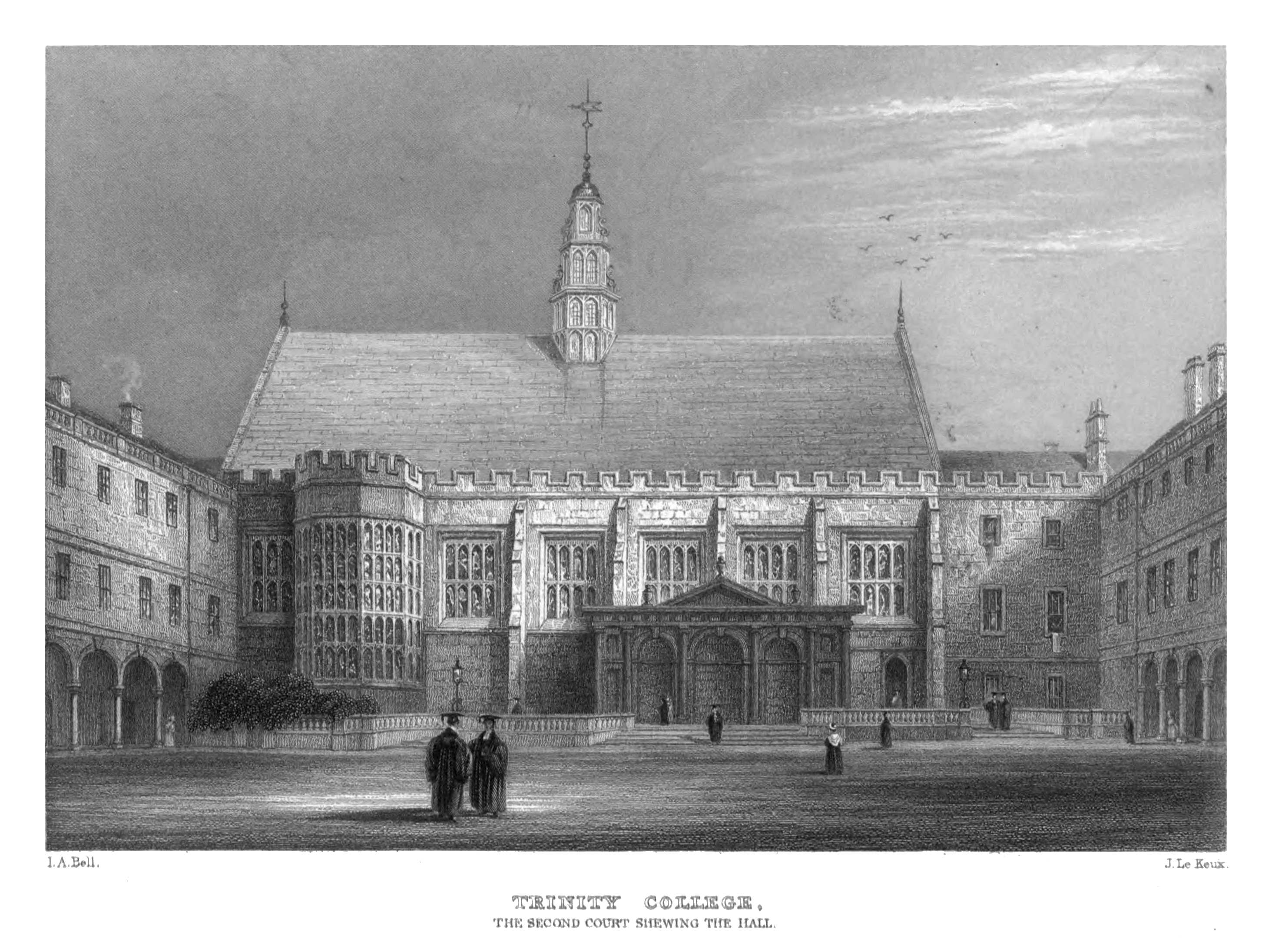
Trinity College, Cambridge in c. 1840, around the time Jacomb-Hood briefly studied there

Jacomb-Hood's father wanted him to pursue a career as a barrister, and had discouraged his son's interest in engineering; at first, Jacomb-Hood respected his father's wishes, choosing to study law. He was admitted to Trinity College, Cambridge, on 25 May 1840 and began his degree the same year. He is listed in Alumni Cantabrigienses as a pensioner (full fee-paying student) and described to be "of Bardon Park, Leics". Yet in April 1841, following what the historian Alan A. Jackson describes as a "couple of unsuccessful terms", Jacomb-Hood dropped out of Trinity College, instead choosing to become a railway engineer.

== Career ==
=== 1841–1846: Early career ===
After dropping out of university, Jacomb-Hood scheduled an interview with civil engineer Charles Fox to join his company Fox & Henderson. A former classmate from Hathern, Albert Pell, had been employed at the company, however, and warned Jacomb-Hood against working there. Jacomb-Hood then tried to get a job from John Birkinshaw, who worked under Robert Stephenson on the Birmingham and Derby Junction Railway. Birkinshaw was ill and unable to meet; Jacomb-Hood later wrote in his diaries that "fortunately [... he] escaped connection with a man who though a clever engineer, turned out in other respects very badly". He finally managed to become the student of the railway engineer George W. Buck, then the Chief Engineer of the Manchester and Birmingham Railway (M&BR) alongside Robert Stephenson.

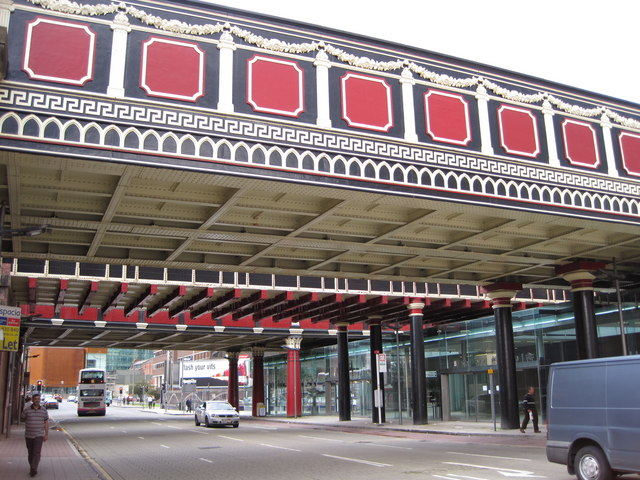
The Salford Central railway bridges, which Jacomb-Hood engineered.

Buck initially sent Jacomb-Hood to spend nine months working under draughtsman Charles Wild to make the technical drawings for the railway. Jacomb-Hood wrote highly of both Buck and Wild in his diaries, describing them as "a most excellent master" and "one of the cleverest draftsmen", respectively. Buck then sent Jacomb-Hood to Sandbach to assist William Baker, who was responsible for a stretch of what would become the Crewe–Manchester line near Holmes Chapel. When the line reached Crewe in 1843, Jacomb-Hood's apprenticeship came to an end; Buck, who, by this time, had stopped working for the M&BR and was instead practicing privately in Manchester, hired Jacomb-Hood as his Chief Assistant. During his time as Chief Assistant to Buck, Jacomb-Hood was tasked with projects including the design and construction of the Salford Central bridges over New Bailey Road, replacing an older version. In late 1843, the M&BR again employed Jacomb-Hood as an assistant to Baker, to work on the section of the railway between Macclesfield and Cheadle Hulme (now part of the Stafford–Manchester line). He began working on the line on 25 December 1843, and carried on through the first few months of 1844.

After he had finished leading the engineering works, he returned to Baker's office in order to work on the plans for the Manchester, South Junction and Altrincham Railway and other schemes. He was then employed as their Resident Engineer from 1 September 1844; the railway is now known as the Altrincham Line, which forms part of Manchester Metrolink. He kept this role for two years until 1846. During his time as Resident Engineer he also worked with Baker on the Shropshire Union Canal and the Wilmslow & Knutsford Railway. He also turned down offers to become the Resident Engineer of the Leeds and Thirsk Railway and to start a partnership with Baker, instead deciding to apply for the new role as Resident Engineer on the London, Brighton and South Coast Railway.

=== 1846–1850: Early LB&SCR work ===
On 27 July 1846, the London, Brighton and South Coast Railway (LB&SCR) formed as an amalgamation of companies including the London and Brighton Railway and the London and Croydon Railway. Earlier that year on 6 May, Jacomb-Hood had attended a meeting of the provisional board as a candidate for the company's Resident Engineer. The sixty-two applicants were reduced to a shortlist of three, from which Jacomb-Hood was chosen as the inaugural officeholder. He was responsible for the construction, maintenance, and planning of the lines, stations, and goods depots, and his starting salary was £500, equivalent to £50,000 in 2025.

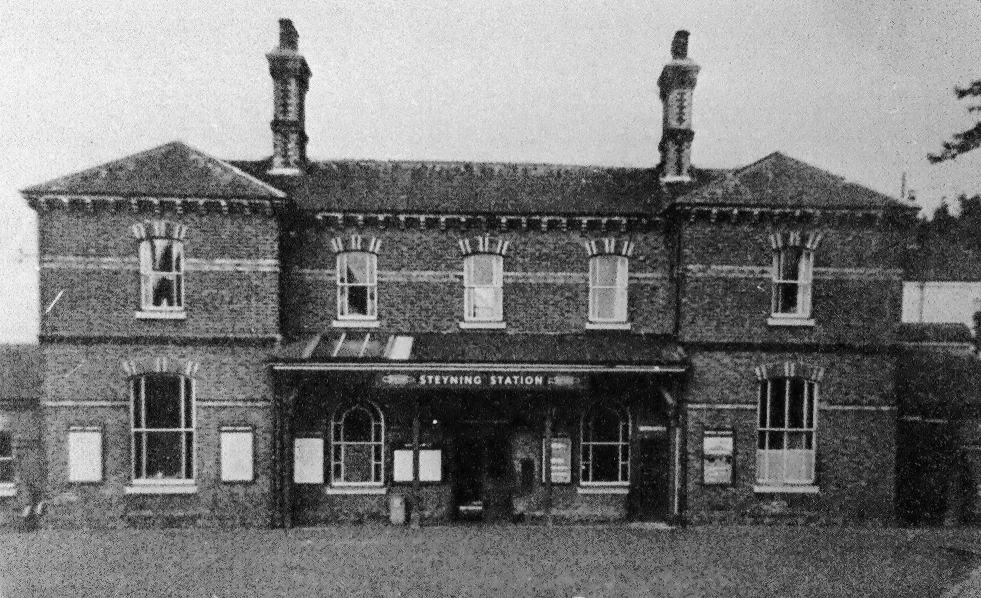
A photograph of Steyning railway station on the Steyning Line, taken on opening day in 1861.

In Jacomb-Hood's first years at the company, he mainly focussed on station construction, contract management, and the new termini at London Bridge and Bricklayers Arms. He also designed and oversaw the construction of many branch lines, such as the Cuckoo Line, the Seaford branch, and the Steyning Line. This was combined with the slow expansion of the Brighton Main Line down to, and then along, the South Coast. Jacomb-Hood was tasked with further expansion works during 1847, including the completion of the Epsom Downs Branch to serve the upcoming Epsom Derby, held that year on 19 May.

On 2 March 1847, Jacomb-Hood was elected a Member of the Institution of Civil Engineers (MICE). His work did not always involve construction; for example, he was also tasked with converting the Croydon Atmospheric Railway to operate by use of steam rather than pressure. The line had originally been built by the London and Croydon Railway, a precursor to the LB&SCR, and the conversion finished in May 1847. The speed at which the LB&SCR was constructing its lines led to his salary being increased to £750 before bonuses—equivalent to £76,000 in 2025—from 1 July 1847.

The economic success of Jacomb-Hood and the LB&SCR did not last long. By October 1847, the company had been unable to find the money to complete more construction work, and was prepared to fire Jacomb-Hood and the entirety of his staff. He offered his resignation letter to the company on 3 January 1848, but it was overturned by a meeting of the board on 14 February as part of a wider investigation into the conduct and finances of the company. On 18 March, board member Leo Schuster confirmed to Jacomb-Hood that he would be reappointed at the same salary, and his work was to be gradually resumed. From May 1848, he took in his brother George Jacomb-Hood as a pupil; the pair lived together in rented accommodation in Brighton, before moving to Westminster in early 1849. (Note: Their exact address was 20 Manchester Street, Westminster; the house, as part of numbers 18–27, has been Grade II listed since 1970.)

On 10 January 1849, Jacomb-Hood was appointed as the engineer to the Portsmouth line, a joint project between the LB&SCR and the London and South Western Railway. The same year he also began giving out the contracts for London Bridge station, which first opened on 2 August 1850. Earlier that year, on 2 April, Jacomb-Hood had presented a paper to the Institution of Civil Engineers detailing how he engineered the LB&SCR's vertical-lift bridge over the Grand Surrey Canal in London. The project, which ran between October 1848 and June 1849, had a total cost of £1300, equivalent to £134,000 in 2025. The bridge was 13 feet (4.0 m) wide with a single track that could be lifted up and down by a crank handle; it was dismantled after the freight branch closed in January 1964. On 7 November 1850, the Institution of Civil Engineers awarded him a Council Premium of Books for the paper. In September 1850, Jacomb-Hood's cousin William Jacomb became his pupil at the LB&SCR.

=== 1850–1860: Expansion of the LB&SCR ===
In the 1850s, the LB&SCR saw significant expansion and financial success. Jacomb-Hood's pay therefore continued to increase, and from 1852 he received an annual bonus proportionate to the dividends of the company, and began investing. On 24 May 1852, Jacomb-Hood attended the first meeting of the Crystal Palace Board, the company responsible for the site in Sydenham, London, onto which The Crystal Palace—the huge glasshouse that had hosted the Great Exhibition—would be relocated. The board decided that a railway should be incorporated into the site, and made Jacomb-Hood responsible for the construction of this branch. The same year, he began the enlargement of London Bridge station, into which the company moved on 27 March 1854, and the construction of Lewes railway station. The LB&SCR also tasked him with the construction of branch lines such as the Arun Valley line and the Oxted line.

In February 1854, Jacomb-Hood hired Guilford Lindsey Molesworth as his assistant; Molesworth would later serve as the 41st President of the Institution of Civil Engineers from November 1904 to November 1905. On 10 June 1854, Jacomb-Hood and his wife were among 40,000 guests at the opening ceremony of The Crystal Palace on its new site. By 1855, Jacomb-Hood's salary had reached £750, as well as a dividend bonus of £309, equivalent to £99,000 in 2025. In July of the same year, he also negotiated working privately on a new railway between Lewes and Uckfield (now part of the Wealden Line); he started this work on 7 August 1857 and would open on 11 October of the next year. He also hired his younger brother John to work alongside him, tasking him with work in Portsmouth and Newcastle before finding him a job in Bombay (now Mumbai), India, in October 1857. The financial success of the LB&SCR—and, with it, that of Jacomb-Hood—continued through to the end of the 1850s; he was promised a salary of £1,200 from 1860—equivalent to £112,000 in 2025—but that his bonuses would end.

Many difficulties arise from the practice of employing architects to design and execute the station works. If, therefore, the Engineer desires to do full credit to his employers, and to himself, he should in all cases design the station works, either engaging assistants, or working conjointly with an architect, to furnish the necessary amount of architectural decoration, a talent for which is not always combined with constructive ability, or the faculty of judicious arrangement.

— Robert Jacomb-Hood, The Arrangement and Construction of Railway Stations (1858)

On 27 April 1858, Jacomb-Hood submitted a paper to the Institution of Civil Engineers titled The Arrangement and Construction of Railway Stations, which he had written while staying at the Queen's Hotel, Cheltenham. In the paper, Jacomb-Hood argued that despite the average British railway engineer having little architectural training, the design of stations should nonetheless be their professional responsibility. He proposed the concept of 'judicious arrangement'; that is, that the functionality and logistics of a station was more important to its design than architectural grandeur. In their book The Collaborators, Gilbert Herbert and Mark Donchin describe his assertion that railway engineers should design their own stations was highly innovative and unusual for the time. Specific examples of his architectural recommendations included making platforms 30–40 feet (9–12 metres) in length, not segregating passengers travelling in different classes, and not using wide-span roofs or turntables at the majority of stations. On 14 December 1858, he was awarded a Telford Medal by the Institution of Civil Engineering for his work on the paper.

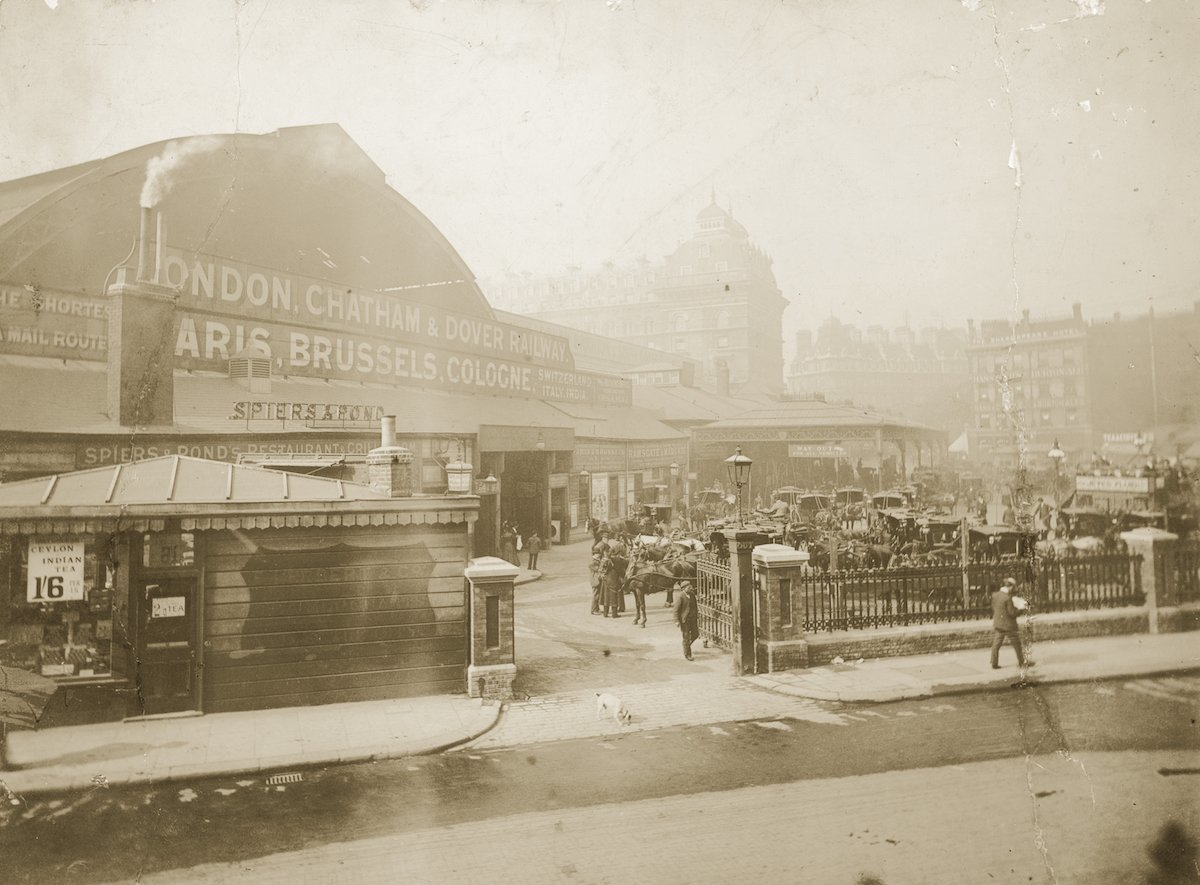
London Victoria station in 1880, Jacomb-Hood's original trainshed is in the centre-right, with the LC&DR's to the left and the Grovesnor Hotel behind

One of Jacomb-Hood's most prominent projects was the construction of London Victoria railway station, which was to be the shared London terminus of the LB&SCR and the London, Chatham and Dover Railway. The station comprised two seemingly unconnected buildings and was financed equally by both railway companies. Jacomb-Hood was responsible for the design of the LB&SCR's half of the station; by applying his principle of judicious arrangement to the roof—built with a single truss design—it cost only £17 per 100 square feet (9.3 m^{2}) (£1,800 in 2025), two-thirds the price of the roof built by the London, Chatham and Dover Railway on the other side. Specific techniques Jacomb-Hood employed for Victoria station included placing the iron girders supporting the roof in the centre of each platform to prevent a train colliding with them, and creating arched entrances to each platform which advertised the destinations of its trains. The station opened to passengers on 1 October 1860; Jacomb-Hood's side of the station was demolished between 1899 and 1909 to make way for a new façade, roof, and platforms, which were designed by Charles Langbridge Morgan.

=== 1860–1869: Full-time private practice ===
The historian Alan A. Jackson describes 1860 as a "milestone year" for Jacomb-Hood; on 29 September, Jacomb-Hood resigned as Resident Engineer due to the pressure of managing the parliamentary side of railway engineering. (Note: In order to purchase the land and raise the capital for a railway project, an act known as a private act had to be passed through the Parliament of the United Kingdom. These were incredibly time consuming and expensive; for example, Isambard Kingdom Brunel appeared before parliamentary committees 233 times in his career.) Instead, he chose to start practising privately as a civil engineer in Westminster, London, but agreed to work on his projects ongoing as of 31 December, in return for a fee of £3,500, equivalent to £368,000 in 2025. During his time in private practice, Jacomb-Hood worked on the Arun Valley line, South London line, and Cranleigh line among others. From 1860 to 1863, he worked with the British architect Charles Driver on projects including the Dorking to Leatherhead line, and Portsmouth & Southsea and Tunbridge Wells railway stations. Having been employed by his brother in various ways (likely as a result of nepotism), George Jacomb-Hood hosted a farewell party on 24 November 1863 before leaving the country to engineer the Scinde Railway in India, ending his pupilage.

In his early years of practising privately, Jacomb-Hood collaborated with the engineer George Parker Bidder on the construction of various projects. Despite the fact that Jacomb-Hood had left direct employment of the LB&SCR only a few years prior, the pair assumed all of the company's engineering works contractually from November 1863, splitting their profits evenly. On 29 July 1864, the Horsham, Leatherhead and Dorking Railway was absorbed by the LB&SCR; the pair then finished the construction of the line together before it opened on 1 May 1867. Among the many other projects that the pair worked on were the Portsmouth line between Peckham Rye and Sutton railway stations, completed by June 1867, and the plans for the East London Railway (now partially the East London line) and Axminster and Lyme Regis Railway.

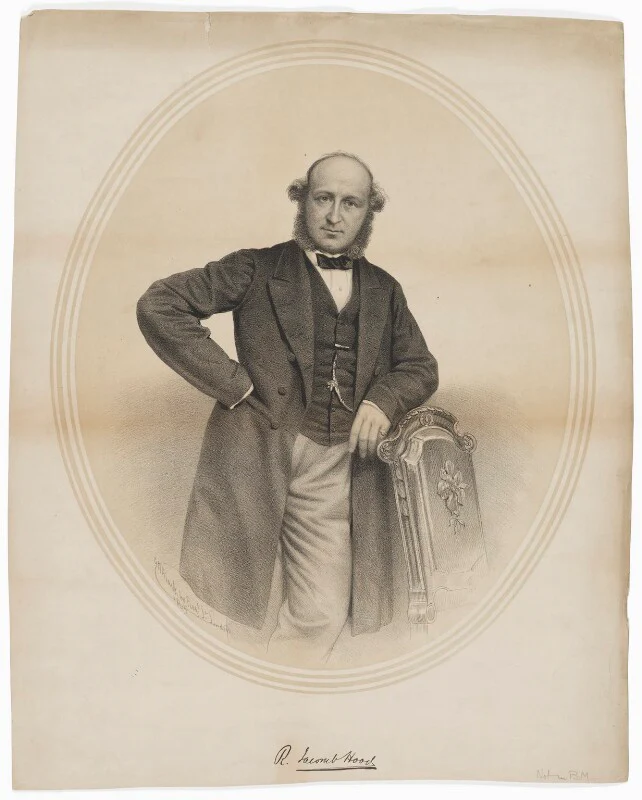
1865 lithograph of Jacomb-Hood

In 1865, the lithographer George B. Black made a portrait of Jacomb-Hood; it is part of the National Portrait Gallery's collection having been purchased in 1966. On 3 July of the same year, Jacomb-Hood entered into a partnership with his cousin and former student William Jacomb; the pair practised in Little George Street in the City of Westminster, trading as 'Hood and Jacomb'. The agreement between them was that Jacomb would provide one third of the necessary capital in return for one third of the profits. Together, they worked on projects across the United Kingdom, such as the Chichester and Midhurst Railway, which formed part of the Midhurst Railways, and the Bexleyheath line. In December 1865, Jacomb-Hood travelled to Edinburgh to enter the competition to redesign Edinburgh Waverley railway station, but the contract was given instead to James Bell, the Chief Engineer of the North British Railway. (Note: The station was extended based on a design Bell had submitted in 1869. Due to the station remaining open during construction, these changes were not fully implemented until the 1870s.)

On 28 April 1866, a bridge being built in Sutton, London as part of Jacomb-Hood's work collapsed, killing six men. The bridge was being built over a railway cutting between Mitcham and Sutton, but due to the chalk ground it was unstable. The workmen who knew this and refused to keep working on it had been dismissed. Then, on 29 May, the LB&SCR stopped all its work due to the railway company being in financial difficulties, and Jacomb-Hood was instructed to withdraw or suspend all of the company's parliamentary proposals. He was nevertheless able to continue his work with the South Eastern Railway and the London, Chatham and Dover Railway, and assist negotiations between the Great Northern Railway and the Edgware, Highgate and London Railway. The financial situation of the LB&SCR had not improved by 1867, and the company descended into chaos with the appointment of an entirely new board of directors; this greatly jeopardised the company's abilities to pass legislation and continue constructing lines.

In the late 1860s Jacomb-Hood also engaged in civil engineering works not directly related to the railways; in 1867, he helped Robert Smirke to complete the ironwork on the roof of the National Gallery building in London alongside his partner William Jacomb. The pair were then tasked by the War Office (now the Ministry of Defence) in 1868 to plan repairs to the Portcreek Viaduct near Portsmouth, Hampshire; the works were carried out the following year. In December 1868, Jacomb-Hood also helped with the inspection of the harbour at St Just in Penwith, Cornwall.

In May 1869, Jacomb-Hood was given the title of Consulting Engineer at the LB&SCR in order for him to assist his successor, Frederick Banister, in his work; Jacomb-Hood then worked on once again reorganising the engineering department at the railway. In December 1869, William Jacomb was hired as the Resident Engineer of the London and South Western Railway, as a result of which their partnership was dissolved on 31 December by mutual consent; he would hold this position from the start of 1870 until 1887. Combined with the death of his wife the same year (see § Personal life), this motivated Jacomb-Hood to end full time practice and enter semi-retirement, moving to a smaller office in Westminster.

=== 1869–1883: Semi-retirement ===
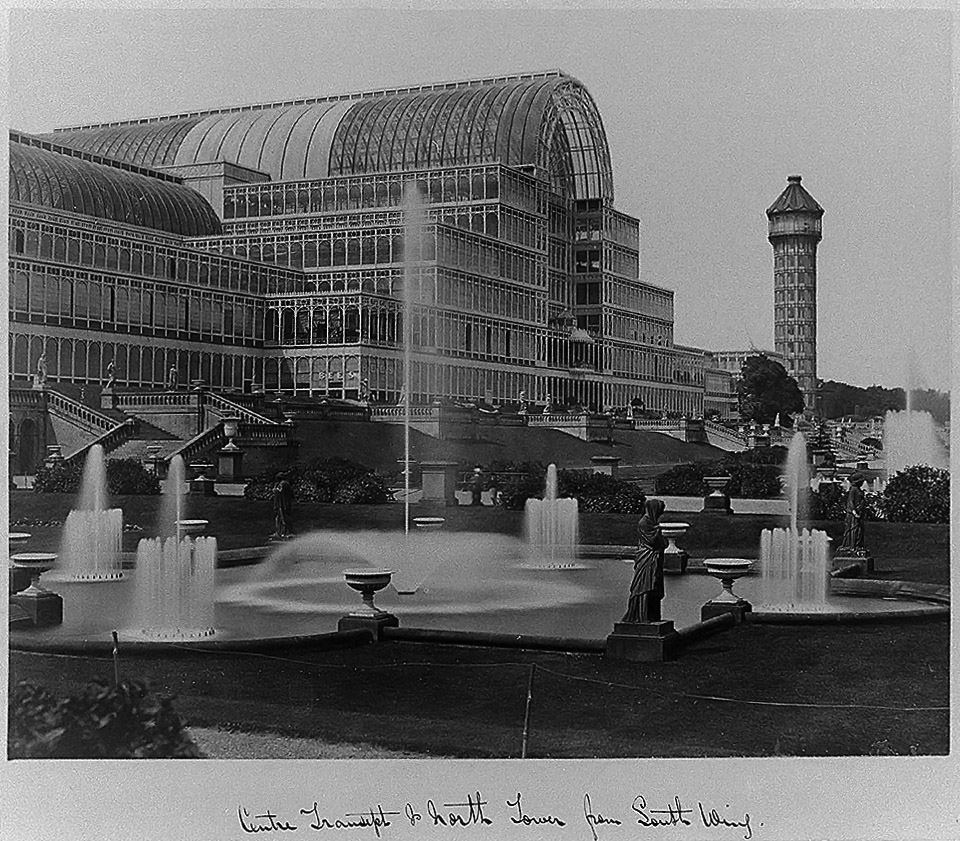
The Crystal Palace in 1854

To make up for the subsequent loss of income, Jacomb-Hood accepted several directorships. The first, with the Crystal Palace Company, began on 30 December 1869; of its eight original board members, two were also board members of the LB&SCR. (Note: These were Samuel Laing and Leo Schuster.) In May 1870, Jacomb-Hood travelled to continental Europe in advance of the creation of the Crystal Palace Aquarium, in which he would become heavily involved in the construction and management. The project, which was led by the aquarist William Alford Lloyd, involved building the first stand-alone aquarium outside of a zoo and by far the largest aquarium in the British Isles when it opened in 1871. Despite this, it did not see financial success, and Jacomb-Hood left the board in 1879. On 1 November 1870, Jacomb-Hood joined the board of the Anglo-Maltese Hydraulic Dock Company. Based in Victoria Street, London, the company was constructing a dock in Malta which used a hydraulic system to lift boats out of the water and into a dry dock. The dock was finished in 1873 at a cost of £143,000, 13,443,000, and Jacomb-Hood was sent to Malta to assist in the company's affairs in July 1873, and he visited Malta again in the summer of 1874. He left the board in May 1877.

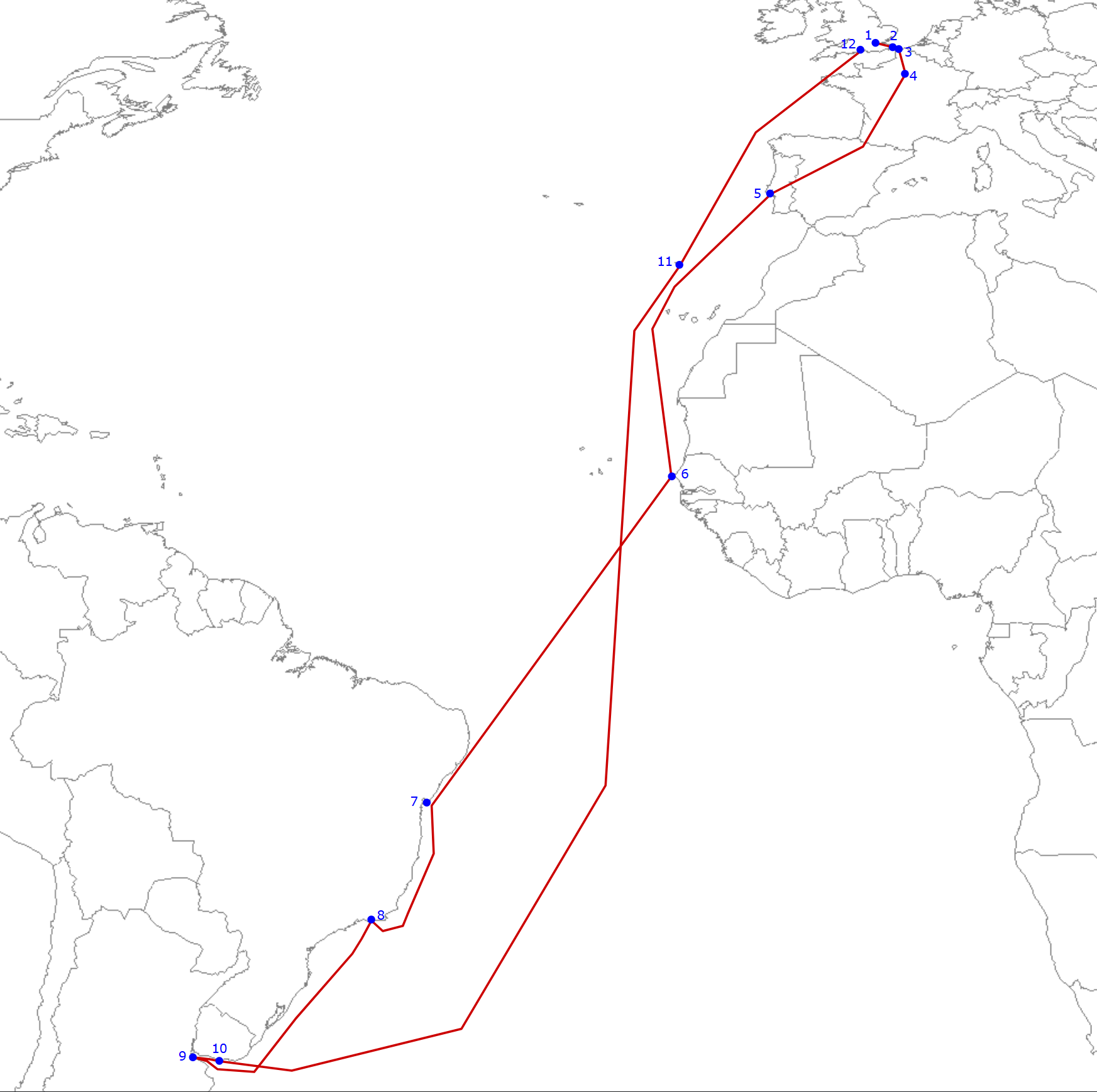
Jacomb-Hood's voyage to Argentina in 1872: (Note: All countries listed are the modern day jurisdictions for the locations, not necessarily those at the time. The locations (blue dots) are accurate, while the path (red line) is simply a rough sea-based dot-to-dot render rather than a certain path.): 1. London, UK; 2. Dover, UK; 3. Calais, France; 4. Paris, France; 5. Lisbon, Portugal; 6. Dakar, Senegal; 7. Salvador, Brazil; 8. Rio de Janeiro, Brazil; 9. Buenos Aires, Argentina; 10. Montevideo, Uruguay; 11. Funchal, Portugal; 12. Southampton, UK.

Samuel Laing, as well as being Chairman of the LB&SCR, led a consortium interested in purchasing the Central Northern Railway between Córdoba and Tucumán. Jacomb-Hood was commissioned to travel to Argentina and carry out the negotiations alongside the consortium's representative, a Mr J Lloyd. Jacomb-Hood incorporated the visit into a wider holiday between January and May 1872, including visits to southeast Europe, West Africa, and the Atlantic coast of South America (see image for full route). He arrived back in the United Kingdom at Southampton on 13 June. Upon his return, he gave up his last Westminster office, which closed on 8 July 1872. The railway was eventually bought by the British-owned Córdoba Central Railway in 1887.

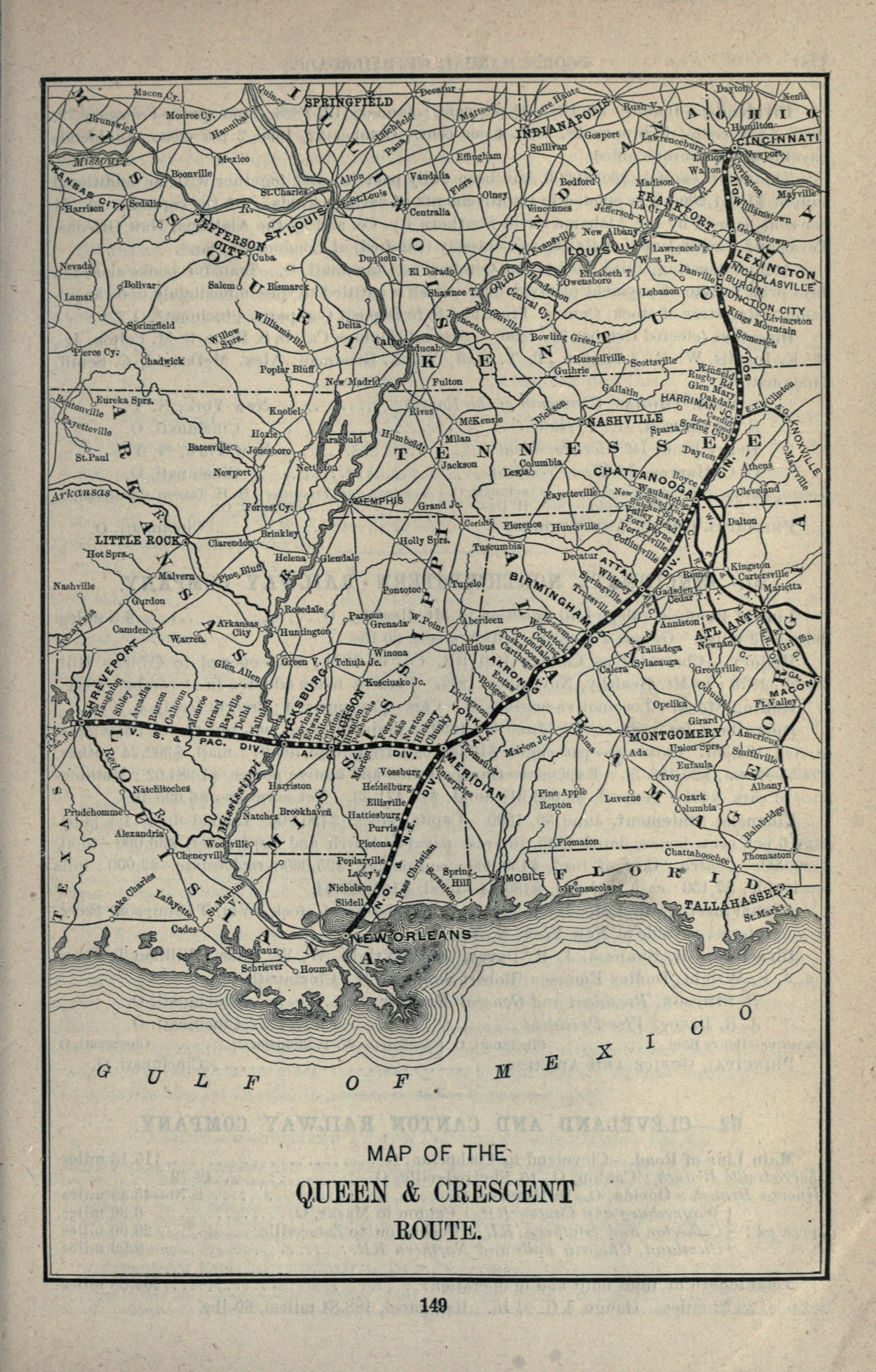
An 1891 map of the Alabama and Great Southern Railway; Jacomb-Hood was instrumental in the company's creation.

In 1877, Jacomb-Hood was commissioned by Emile Erlanger & Co. to help them decide whether or not to purchase the Alabama Great Southern Railway Company, which had originally been called the Alabama and Chattanooga Railway; The company had been taken over by the State of Alabama on 1 January 1872 after it defaulted on its bonds. Jacomb-Hood travelled to the United States with Sir Philip Rose, 1st Baronet to inspect and write a report on the line. As a result of this report, Erlanger purchased the railway, reforming the company and clearing the company's debts to their bondholders in the process. Jacomb-Hood served as a director of the company from his election on 30 November 1877 until 1886, helping in its setup alongside Charles Schiff. In 1876, the Thames Haven Petroleum Storage Company began building warehouses to store barrels of petroleum oil from the Thameshaven port; Jacomb-Hood became a director in November 1877, and the company began operating in 1880. It maintained a monopoly on the import of petroleum into London until 1900. Schiff also convinced Jacomb-Hood to join the board of the New Gas Company in September 1878.

In October 1879, Jacomb-Hood again collaborated with the people who had commissioned the Wealden Line between Lewes and Uckfield; this time, he was asked to help plan a restart of the Ouse Valley Railway, on which construction had begun but not been completed. The scheme never came to light and the last work on the line was in February 1869, when the LB&SCR made an agreement with the South Eastern Railway that rendered it useless. In November 1879, there were mass resignations among the board of directors at the Crystal Palace Company, including the chairman, deputy chairman, and Jacomb-Hood; the same year, he was commissioned for a second time by Emile Erlanger & Co., this time to assist with the company's undertakings in the West Indies and the United States. In March 1880 he left the board of the Thames Haven Petroleum Storage Co., and in May joined the board of the Sydney and Louisburg Railway. Situated in Nova Scotia, Canada, the company's main role was to carry coal mined by the Dominion Coal Company, but also carried passengers. (Note: The only extant remains of the railway are the station building in Louisbourg, and is listed in the Canadian Register of Historic Places.)

In December 1880, Jacomb-Hood began planning an entry for the design competition for Liverpool Exchange railway station, and submitted it the following May. Jacomb-Hood was one of forty-three entrants, and on 3 August 1881 John West was declared the winner; the first part of the new station opened on 23 February 1888. Jacomb-Hood also served as a director of the Assam Railways and Trading Company between August 1881 and February 1882, a British company that later became part of the Indian Dibru–Sadiya Railway. It was commissioned to build a line in modern-day Assam on 16 July 1883, which eventually closed on 12 December 2011.

=== 1883–1900: Later work and death ===
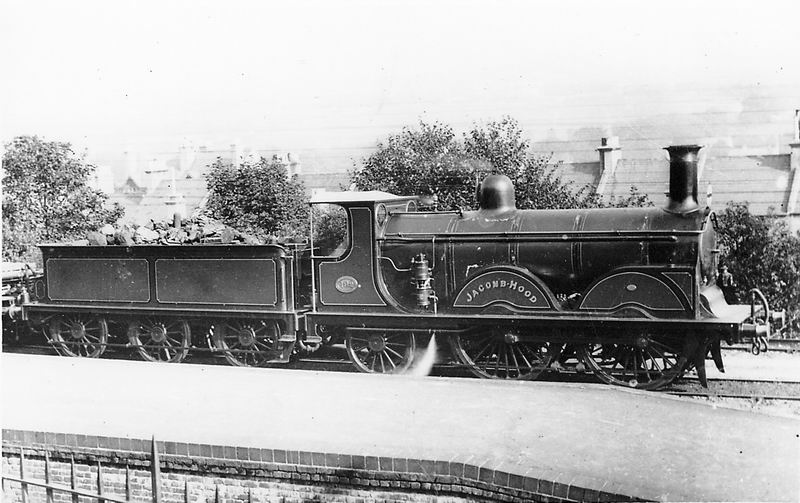
LB&SCR B1 class locomotive number 192, named in honour of Jacomb-Hood

On 7 March 1883, Jacomb-Hood was invited to join the LB&SCR's board of directors as a replacement for the retiring Sir Arthur Otway; in the seventeen years between his appointment to the board and his death, he spent most of his time working on the LB&SCR's business. His early work as a director involved the restructuring of the engineering department at the railway and assisting on individual projects such as Newhaven Harbour railway station. In 1886, he gave up the seats he held on the boards of the Alabama Great Southern Railway Company and the Sydney and Louisburg Railway, ending his involvement in engineering in the Americas that he had held since 1872.

William Jacomb—the cousin and former business partner of Jacomb-Hood—died suddenly on 26 May 1887. Beginning in 1887, Jacomb-Hood started attending the International Railway Congress; he was present at Milan in September 1887, Paris in September 1889, and Brighton in October 1891 (of particular significance as the southern terminus of the LB&SCR). The LB&SCR dedicated one of their B1 class locomotives (known as "Gladstones") to Jacomb-Hood; number 192, named "Jacomb-Hood", was an 0-4-2 locomotive that entered service in November 1888. The name was removed around 1906 and the locomotive left service in December 1927. 1894 was the final year in which Jacomb-Hood is known to have kept diaries. By this point, he worked little and spent most of his time on holidays around the UK and Europe; he had only first visited mainland Europe on 29 May 1849. He was present at the opening of the Tower Bridge in London on 9 July 1894, his last recorded association with a civil engineering project during his lifetime.

Little is known about the last six years of Jacomb-Hood's life beyond his obituary. Jacomb-Hood died suddenly in Tunbridge Wells on 10 May 1900, aged 78. At the time, he was still working for the LB&SCR, and was also one of the longest serving members of the Institution of Civil Engineers, having been elected over 53 years before his death. His obituary—published by the Institution of Civil Engineers—praised his dedication to the LB&SCR, saying that "he spared no pains to place at their service that keen intellect, fine memory and tactful discrimination for which he will be long remembered". (Note: His grave is inscribed with 2 Timothy 4:7 as translated in the King James Version: "I have fought a good fight, I have finished my course, I have kept the faith".)

== Personal life ==
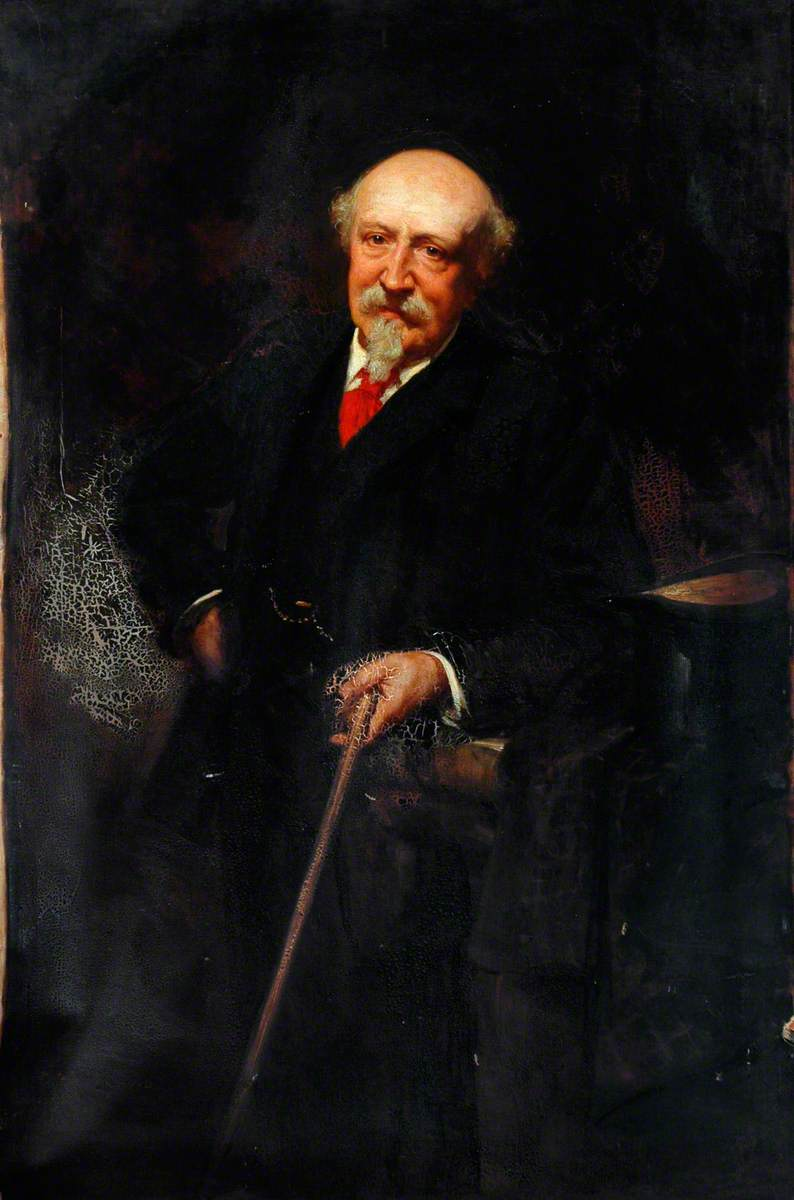
Portrait of an Elderly Gentleman is believed to depict Robert Jacomb-Hood and was painted by his son George.

On 25 November 1851, Jacomb-Hood married Jane Stothard Littlewood. She was the daughter of George Littlewood, who worked as a printer. The pair had met earlier the same year, when she was working as the governess of his cousin's children. According to their marriage certificate, they were married at St George's in the parish of Bloomsbury in Middlesex (now London); neither had been previously married. Jacomb-Hood and Littlewood had nine children, of whom two died in infancy. Their first child, Katie (who later took the surname Dale by marriage), was born on 27 April 1853.

Jacomb-Hood's fourth child, George Percy Jacomb-Hood, was a successful painter and illustrator, and his c. 1895 painting Portrait of an Elderly Gentleman is believed to be a depiction of his father. It is currently held in the archives of the National Railway Museum, having been "obtained as a result of a direct claim of redundant material from the nationalised railway in 1977". His second son, John Wykeham Jacomb-Hood, also became a civil engineer; his career included working as the Chief Engineer of the London and South Western Railway and being elected to the Institution of Civil Engineers like his father.

On the death of his father on 9 July 1857, Jacomb-Hood inherited the family seat at Bardon Park. On 13 June 1864, he sold the whole estate to William Percy Herrick of Beaumanor Hall for £40,000, equivalent to £4,400,000 in 2025, though the conditions of his inheritance required him to split the money equally with his siblings.

On 27 November 1869, Jacomb-Hood's wife Jane died of "dropsical debility", which refers to illness caused by an oedema, a fluid-filled swelling beneath the skin. On 12 August 1870, Jacomb-Hood became engaged to Elizabeth Thornton and on 21 February 1871 they married at St George's, Hanover Square, in the eponymous parish in Middlesex (now London). By this time, his late father was listed as an "esquire" rather than simply a "gentleman". Elizabeth died suddenly in 1875 from cancer; the inscription on her grave gives the date as 10 January, at the age of 46. Jacomb-Hood did not marry again, remaining a widower for the last twenty-five years of his life.

== See also ==
- Benjamin Baker – civil engineer who worked on London's railways.
- John Fowler – railway engineer whose work included the Metropolitan Railway.
- Alexander Ross – Chief Engineer of the GNR.
- Francis Webb – Chief Mechanical Engineer of the LNWR.
