= Stambridge =

Civil parish in Essex, England

Coordinates: 51.591239°N 0.740048°E

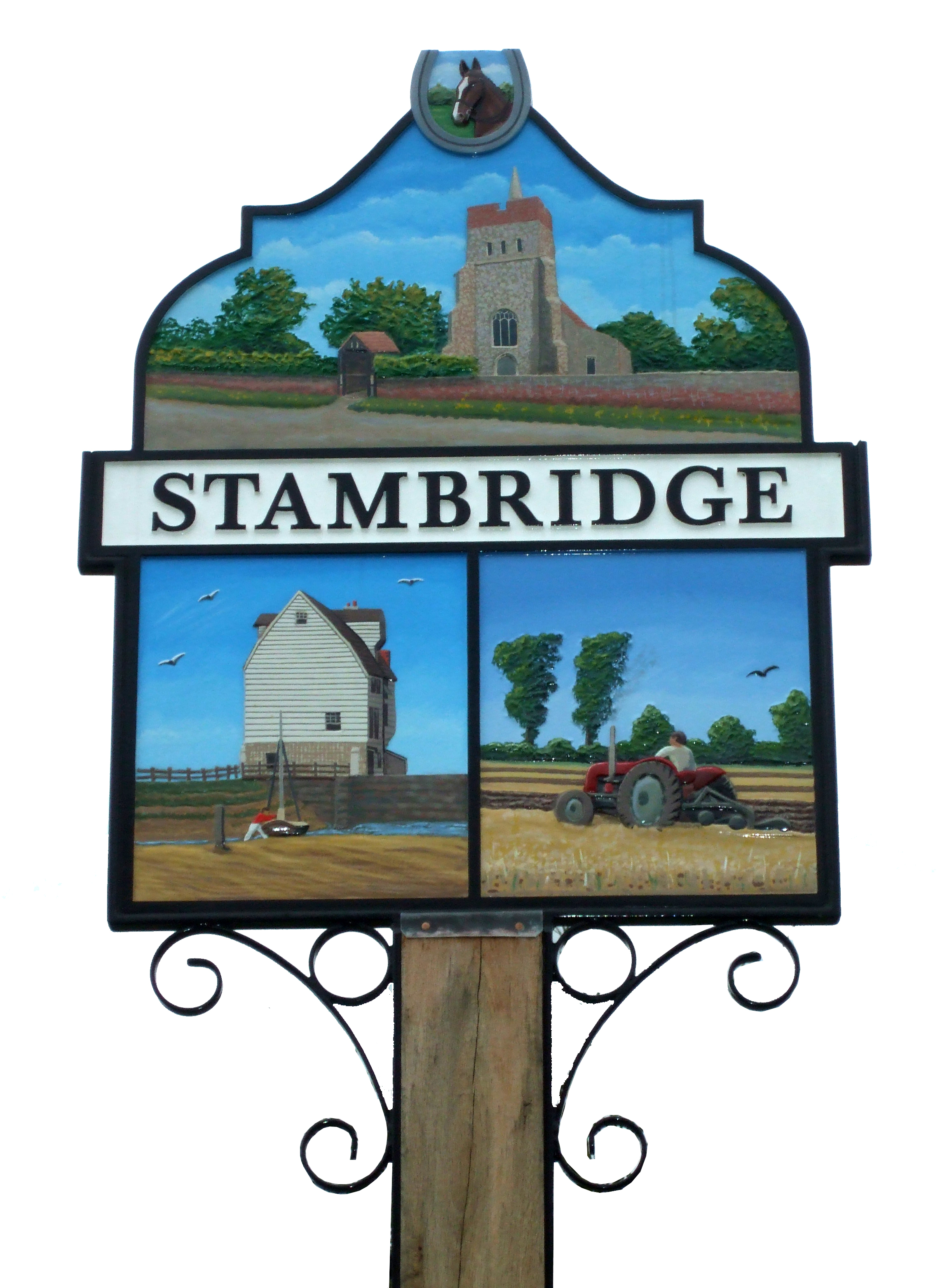
- Village sign

- Location within Essex
- Population: 680 (Parish, 2021)
- OS grid reference: TQ899916
- Civil parish: Stambridge
- District: Rochford
- Shire county: Essex
- Region: East
- Country: England
- Sovereign state: United Kingdom
- Post town: Rochford
- Postcode district: SS4
- Dialling code: 01702
- Police: Essex
- Fire: Essex
- Ambulance: East of England
- UK Parliament: Rayleigh
- Website: Stambridge Parish Council

Stambridge is a civil parish in the Rochford district in Essex, England. It is located north of the River Roach between Rochford and Paglesham. The parish includes the village of Great Stambridge, also known as Stambridge, and the smaller Little Stambridge. At the 2021 census the parish had a population of 680.

== History ==
The name "Stambridge" means "stone bridge". The only bridge in the parish is now brick-built over the small stream that rises in Canewdon, flows under the road just south of the Royal Oak, and into the Roach near "Waldens".

In Saxon times, Stambridge was a vill. By the time of the Domesday Book in 1086, the vill had fragmented into four estates or manors, each of which were listed as Stanbruge in the Rochford Hundred of Essex. The Domesday Book does not otherwise distinguish between the names of the manors, but historians have deduced that two of the manors became the parish of Great Stambridge (or Stambridge Magna) and the other two manors became the parish of Little Stambridge (or Stambridge Parva).

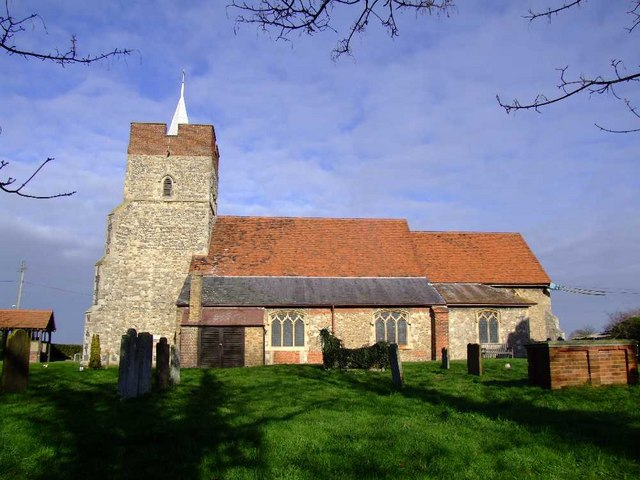
Parish church of St Mary and All Saints, Great Stambridge

Although no church or priest is mentioned at any of the Stambridge manors in the Domesday Book, it is known that Great Stambridge's parish church, dedicated to St Mary and All Saints, pre-dates the Norman Conquest. Little Stambridge's parish church was dedicated to St Mary and stood to the east of Little Stambridge Hall, a manor house dating back to at least the 16th century.

The two parishes were united into one ecclesiastical parish in 1889, and St Mary's at Little Stambridge was demolished in 1891.

Although united for ecclesiastical purposes in 1889, Great Stambridge and Little Stambridge remained separate civil parishes until 1934, when they were also merged into a new civil parish called Stambridge.

The centre of population in Great Stambridge has moved from around the church to the Royal Oak Inn area. The modern parish consists of approximately three square miles. The boundaries are, in the east, Biggins Farm (Paglesham Road); in the west Little Stambridge Hall; the south the River Roach; and in a line crossing Stambridge Road at "Richmonds" and number 159 Stambridge Road. In official postal addresses, the Royal Mail calls the village just "Stambridge" rather than "Great Stambridge".

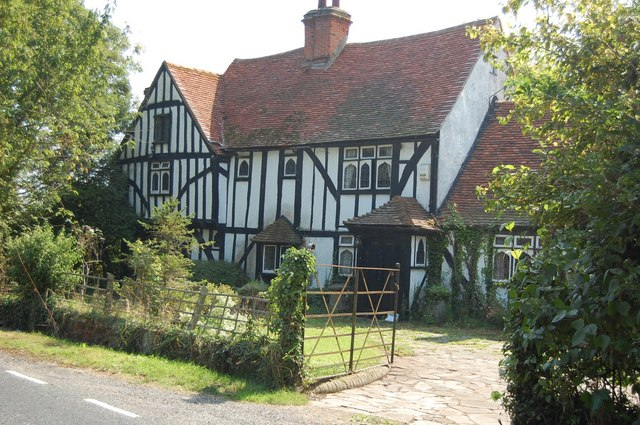
A half-timbered house in Ballards Gore.

The hamlet of Ballards Gore lies at the northern edge of the parish, straddling the boundary with the neighbouring parish of Canewdon.

== Stambridge Mill ==
There was a tide mill at Stambridge for hundreds of years. The building burned down in April 1965. At that time it was owned by Rankins the Millers. It was demolished in 2014.

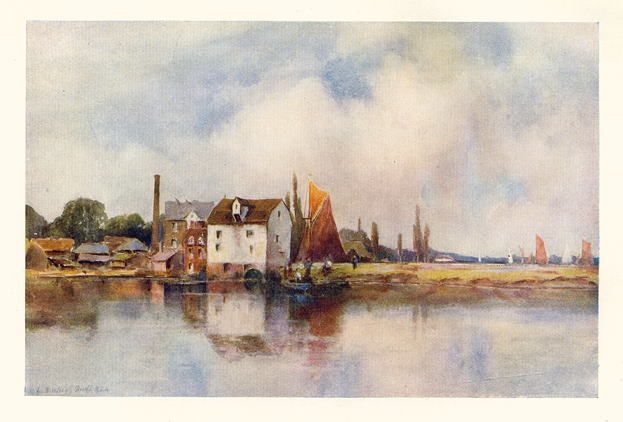
Painting of the mill by Louis Burleigh Bruhl

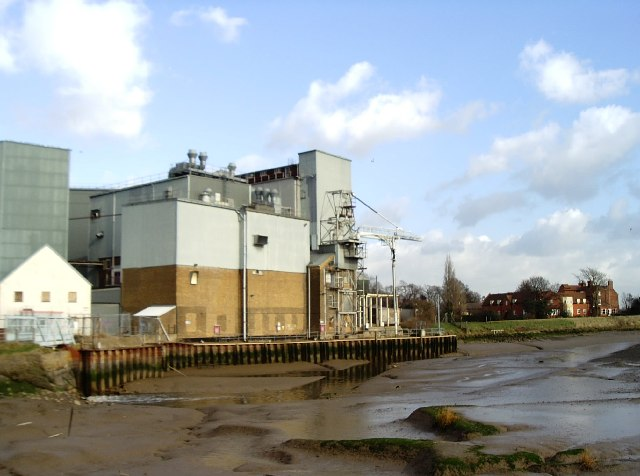
The mill in 2006

== Sport and leisure ==
The local football club, Corinthians FC, currently plays in the Essex Olympian League.
