= Rushley Island =

Uninhabited island in Essex, England

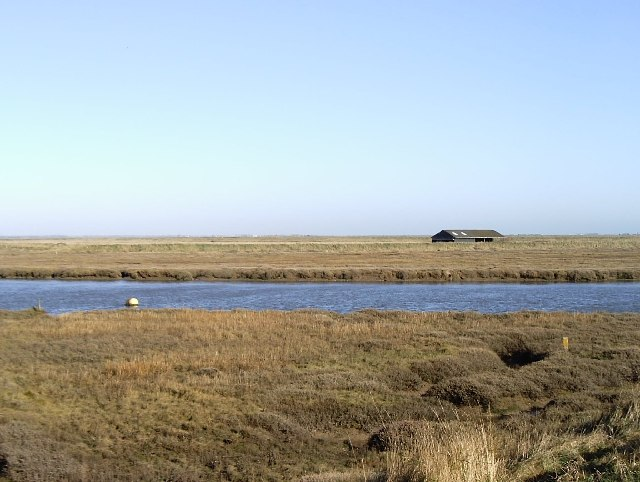
- A view of Rushley Island
- Interactive map of Rushley Island

Geography
- Location: Essex, England, United Kingdom
- Coordinates: 51.565977°N 0.831162°E

Demographics
- Population: Uninhabited

Rushley Island is a small uninhabited island in Essex, England. It is the smallest of six islands comprising an archipelago in Essex, and is privately owned.

== Geography ==
Access to Rushley Island is by a ford across Havengore Creek, which is located at the south-west corner of the island. The Middleway flows southwards from the River Roach between Potton Island and Foulness Island, and splits into two at the northern end of Rushley. The eastern branch becomes Narrow Guts, while the western branch flows around the island and joins Havengore Creek to the south of the island. Narrow Guts and Havengore Creek join just to the north of Havengore Bridge, which provides access to Foulness Island.

== History ==
Prior to the 1780s, Rushley was regularly covered by several feet of water at spring tides, but in 1781-2 John Harriott enclosed around 200 acres (81 ha) of the island by building a sea wall around it. The embankment was 3 miles (4.8 km) long, and having finished building it, he constructed farm buildings and sank wells on the island. It has been the used for farming activities since then.

In the 1970s, a local racehorse trainer and one-time Rushley Island owner, Frank Threadgold, bred and raced a horse which he named after the island.

The island has been owned by the Ministry of Defence, who have used Foulness, Potton and Rushley islands for testing of weapons and undisclosed activities in the national interest. In 2024 the Ministry announced that both Rushley and Potton were no longer needed for these purposes, and would be sold. They had previously been offered for sale some ten years previously, but were not sold on that occasion.
