= Little Stambridge =

Coordinates: 51.5955°N 0.7236°E

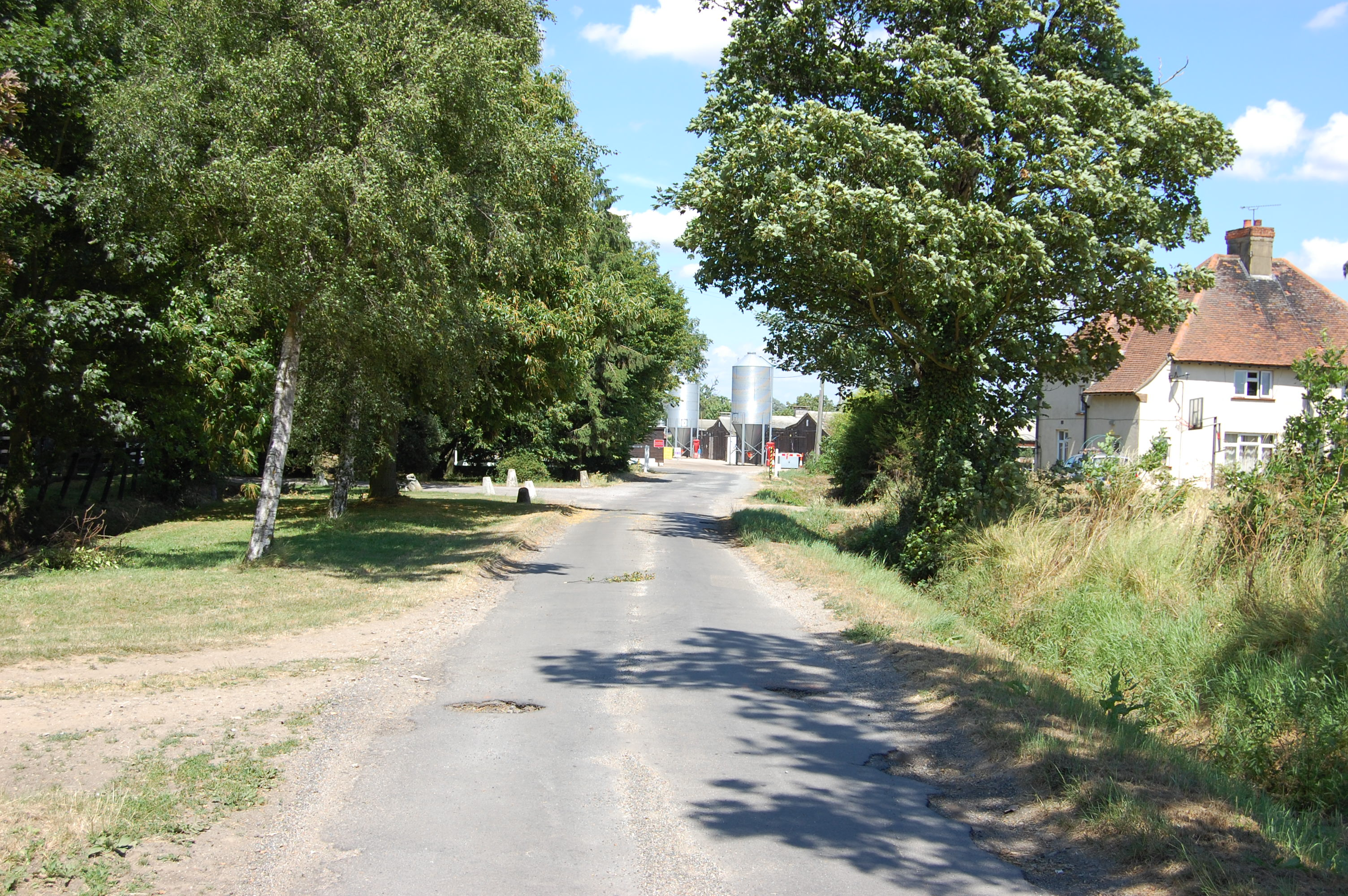
- Little Stambridge Hall Lane

- Location within Essex
- Civil parish: Stambridge
- District: Rochford
- Shire county: Essex
- Region: East
- Country: England
- Sovereign state: United Kingdom
- Post town: ROCHFORD
- Postcode district: SS4

Little Stambridge was a parish in Essex, England. It was merged with neighbouring Great Stambridge for ecclesiastical purposes in 1889 and for civil purposes in 1934. The civil parish of Stambridge now forms part of Rochford District.

Little Stambridge was historically described as a village. The name Little Stambridge is today used as part of the name of its former manor house of Little Stambridge Hall, and in the name of the adjoining road called Little Stambridge Hall Lane. Little Stambridge Hall lies 1 mile (1.6 km) north-east of the centre of Rochford and 4 miles (6 km) north of Southend-on-Sea.

== History ==
The name "Stambridge" means stone bridge.

The Domesday Book of 1086 lists four estates or manors at the vill of Stanbruge in the Rochford Hundred of Essex. The Domesday Book does not otherwise distinguish between the names of the manors, but historians have deduced that two of the manors became the parish of Great Stambridge (or Stambridge Magna) and the other two manors became the parish of Little Stambridge (or Stambridge Parva).

Little Stambridge's parish church was dedicated to St Mary and stood to the east of Little Stambridge Hall, a manor house dating back to at least the 16th century. Little Stambridge was a small village and parish, comprising the cluster of buildings around the manor house and church, along with a few scattered houses and other buildings. These mostly lay along Stambridge Road to the south of the manor house and church, and included the Cherry Tree public house.

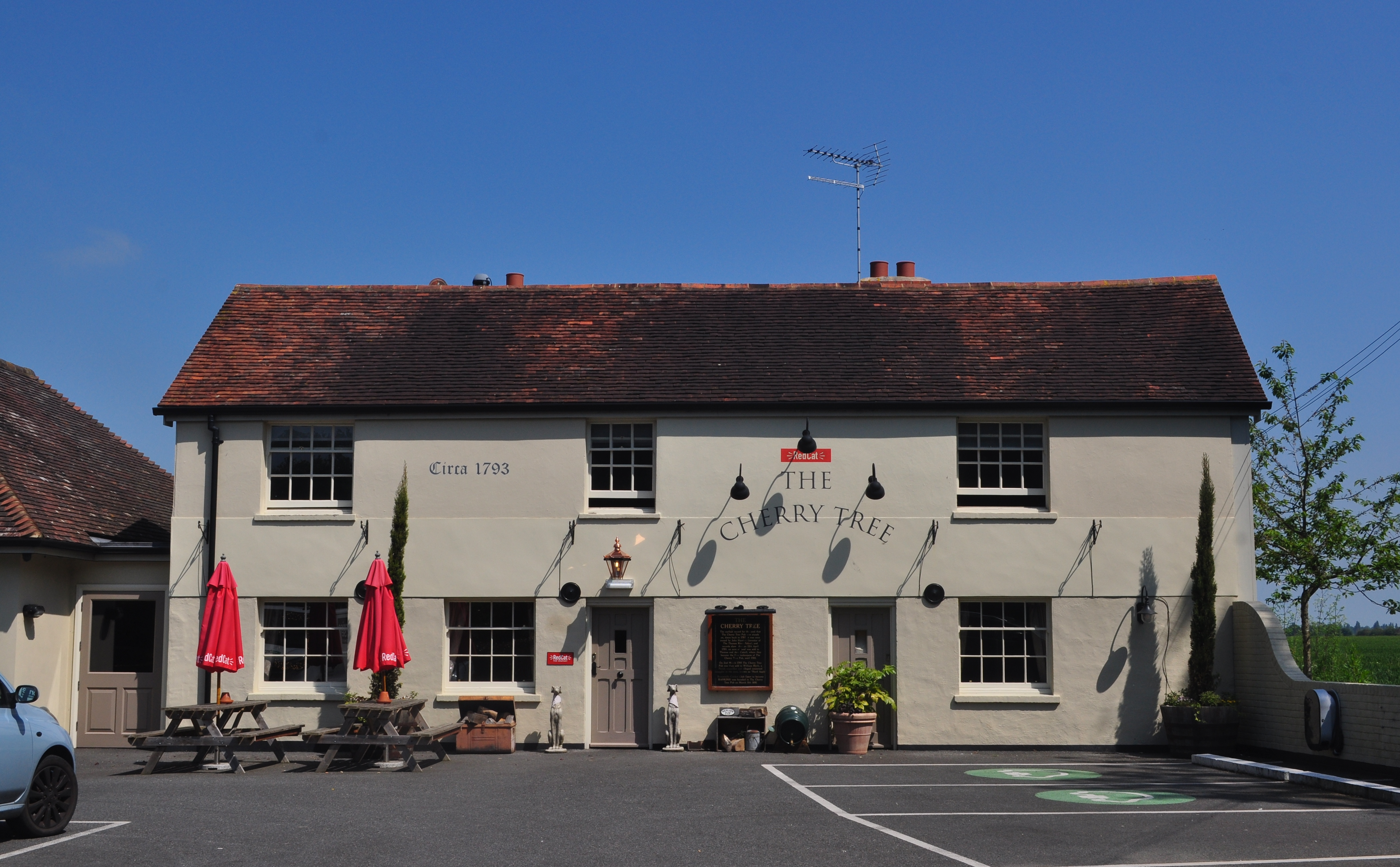
The Cherry Tree public house, which dates back to the 18th century

Little Stambridge and Great Stambridge were united into one ecclesiastical parish in 1889, and St Mary's at Little Stambridge was demolished in 1891.

Although united for ecclesiastical purposes in 1889, Great Stambridge and Little Stambridge remained separate civil parishes. When elected parish and district councils were established in 1894, both civil parishes were included in the Rochford Rural District. In 1934 Little Stambridge and Great Stambridge were merged into a new civil parish called Stambridge. At the 1931 census (the last before the abolition of the civil parish), Little Stambridge had a population of 194. The Rochford Rural District was replaced by the larger Rochford District in 1974.

The name Little Stambridge is no longer shown on Ordnance Survey maps as a place name, but the name is retained by Little Stambridge Hall and is also used as part of the street name for the adjoining road of Little Stambridge Hall Lane.

== Landmarks ==
Listed buildings in the area include Little Stambridge Hall, the "Wall Attached to Little Stambridge Hall and Enclosing Garden to South", the "Cartlodge Attached to Garden Wall, Little Stambridge Hall" and "The Lodge" each of which are Grade II listed buildings.
