= John Staples Harriott =

British army officer (1780–1839)

John Staples Harriott (1780–1839) was a British army officer stationed in India, in the service of the East India Company. He came to acquire the Jami' al-tawarikh in its original manuscript. In his studies of the Roma people, he made an identification with a legend of Bahram Gur and the Luri to support a Romani presence in Sasanid Persia, now considered to be an unjustified and uncritical deduction that has persisted.

== Life ==
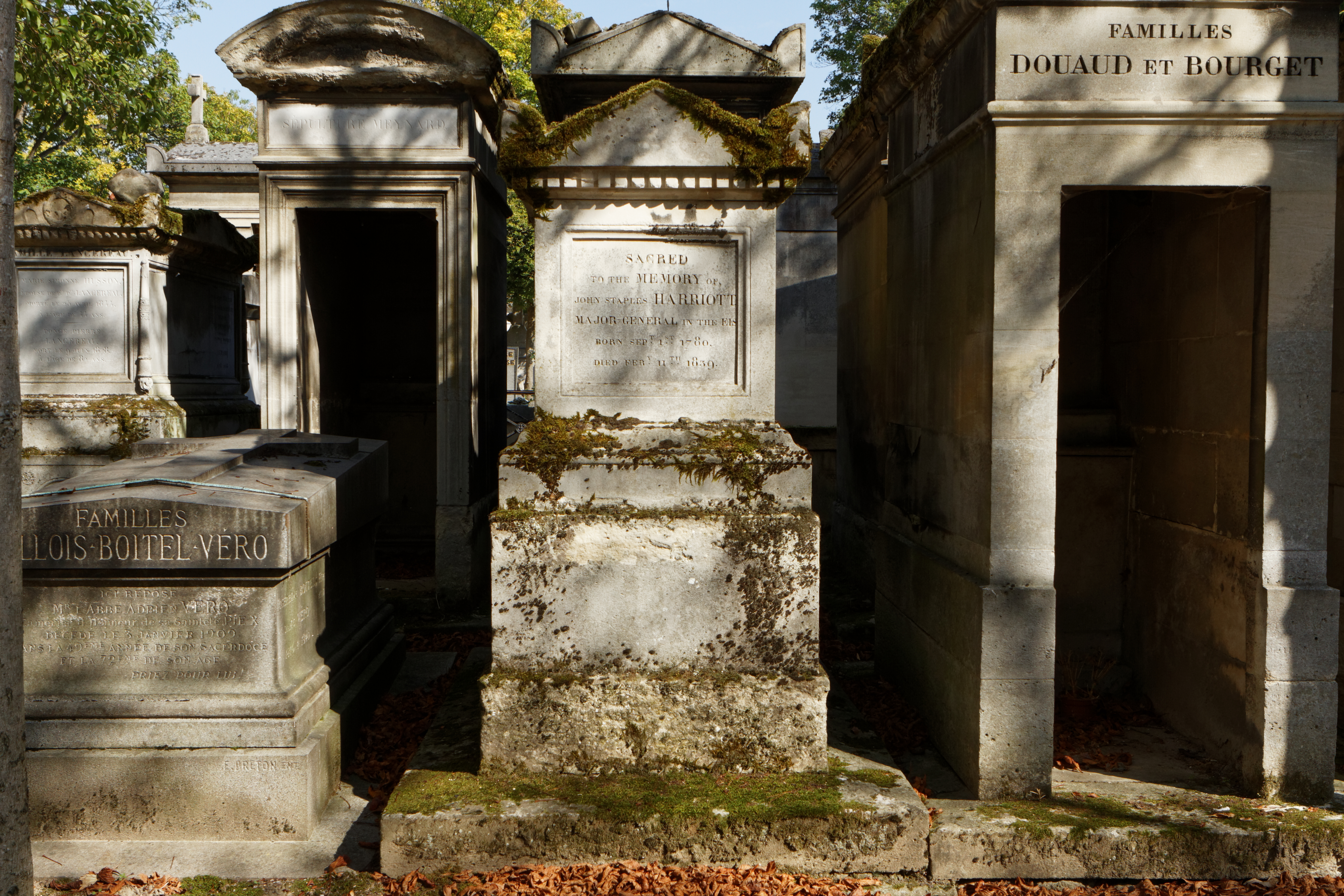
Père-Lachaise Cemetery

He was a son of John Harriott. In 1796 he became a cadet with the East India Company, and became a lieutenant in the Bengal Presidency in 1798, captain in 1806, and major in 1817; lieutenant-colonel in 1823 and colonel in 1829. In 1803 he lost a leg at the Battle of Delhi, serving under Lord Lake. He lived much of his life in Calcutta, and ultimately reached the rank of Major General.

In 1819–20 Harriott was collecting Romani vocabulary in Hampshire, England. Some of his results were read to the Asiatic Society of Bengal in 1822. In 1830 a membership list for the Royal Asiatic Society gives his address as Mortlake.

== Jami Al Tawarikh ==
Harriott is known as one of the owners of the key manuscript of the Jami' al-tawarikh, an important medieval manuscript dealing with Mongol history. How he came into its possession is not clearly known. According to Sotheby's, he found it in Danapur in 1813. William Hook Morley noticed it in the Royal Asiatic Society's manuscript collection in 1838. From 1948 it was at the British Museum, on loan, and then was sold, to an unknown purchaser.

== Works ==
- Pauperism and the Poor Laws (1821)
- Observations on the Oriental Origin of the Romnichal, Or Tribe Miscalled Gypsey and Bohemian (1830)
- A memoir on the Kabir panths, in French translation (1832)
- Remarks Relative to the Actual Condition of Ireland, Made During a Late Sojourn in that Country
