= Paglesham =

Village in Essex, England

Coordinates: 51.597068°N 0.790071°E

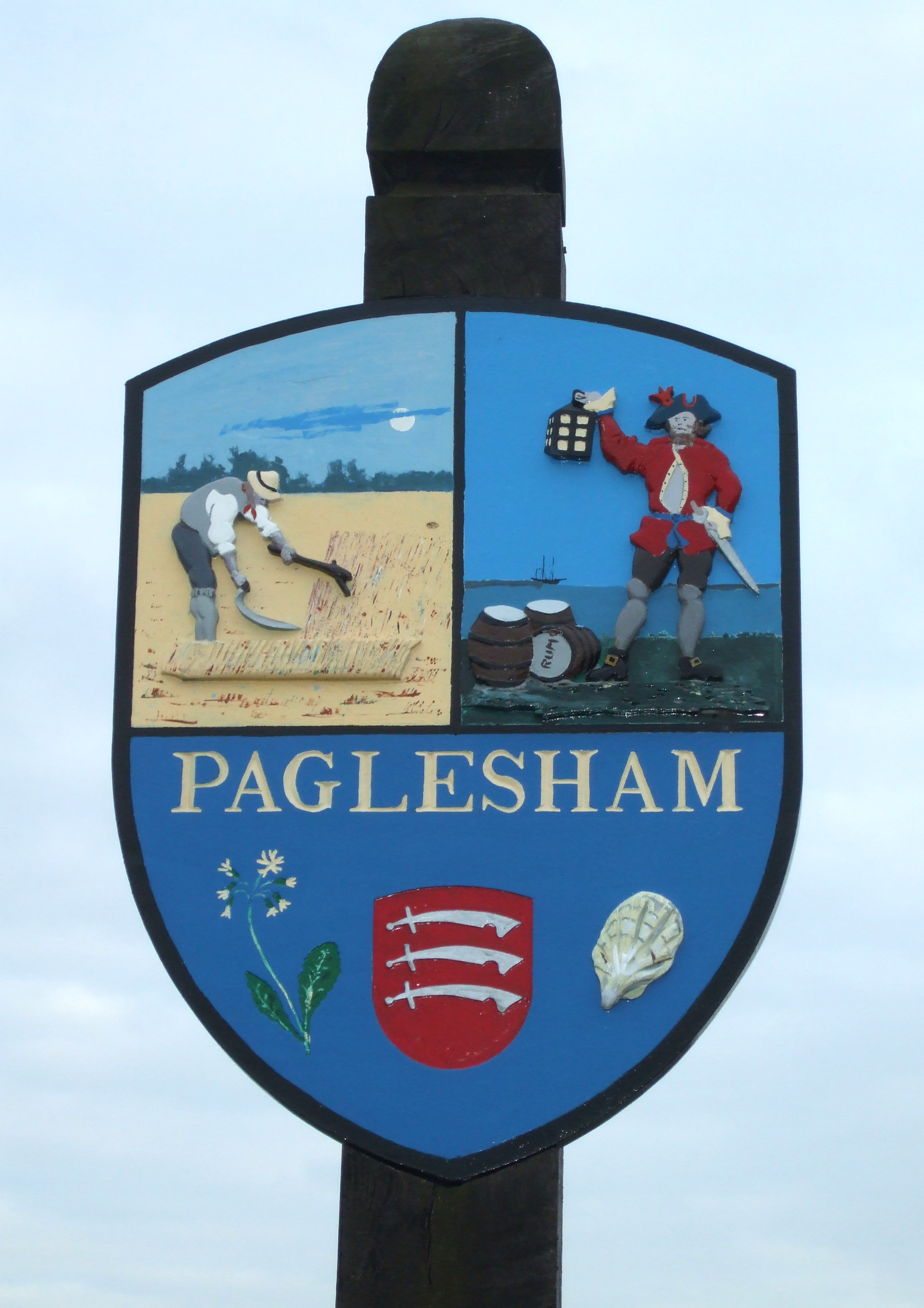
- Paglesham's village sign

- Location within Essex
- Population: 236 (Parish, 2021)
- OS grid reference: TQ9321892431
- Civil parish: Paglesham
- District: Rochford
- Shire county: Essex
- Region: East
- Country: England
- Sovereign state: United Kingdom
- Post town: ROCHFORD
- Postcode district: SS4
- Dialling code: 01702
- Police: Essex
- Fire: Essex
- Ambulance: East of England
- UK Parliament: Southend East and Rochford

Paglesham (/ˈpæɡəlʃəm/ PAG-əl-shəm) is a village and civil parish in the Rochford District of Essex, England. The parish includes two hamlets of Eastend and Churchend, which are situated near the River Crouch and Paglesham Creek. It is part of the Roach Valley Conservation Zone. At the 2021 census the parish had a population of 236.

At Eastend are a small number of houses and the Plough and Sail public house. There is an unmade road (Waterside Road) leading to a boatyard on the River Roach.

At Churchend is St Peter's Church. There are a small number of houses, two farms, and the Punch Bowl Inn.

The two hamlets form one of Essex's oldest fishing villages and the area was once renowned as a smuggling centre. This included being home to one of the more famous smugglers in the region, Hard Apple, who was actually the parish councillor and local constable William Blyth.

Admiralty records show that the celebrated vessel HMS Beagle, in which Charles Darwin circumnavigated the world, ended its days as a static ship in the river near Paglesham Eastend, guarding against smugglers. It is speculated that the keel of the vessel may yet survive, buried in the mud of the riverbank.

== Name ==
'Paglesham' has many different spellings as found in historic records starting from 1066 AD (e.g. 'Paclesham', 'Pakelisham', 'Pokelesham', 'Paglesande', 'Paddlesham', 'Paylesham', etc.). The name Paglesham is Old English and means "the homestead or village of someone called Pæccel." Alternatively, it is sometimes said that the 'Paecle–' might refer to the cowslip, a flower known locally in Essex as the 'paigle' or 'peggle'.

== Early history ==
The earliest evidence for Saxon occupation in Paglesham is a 6th century Anglo-Saxon square-headed bronze brooch, now held at Southend Museum. Paglesham is named in a charter of 1066 AD, recording the donation of 'Paclesham' owned by Ingulf, a nobleman, to Westminster Abbey.

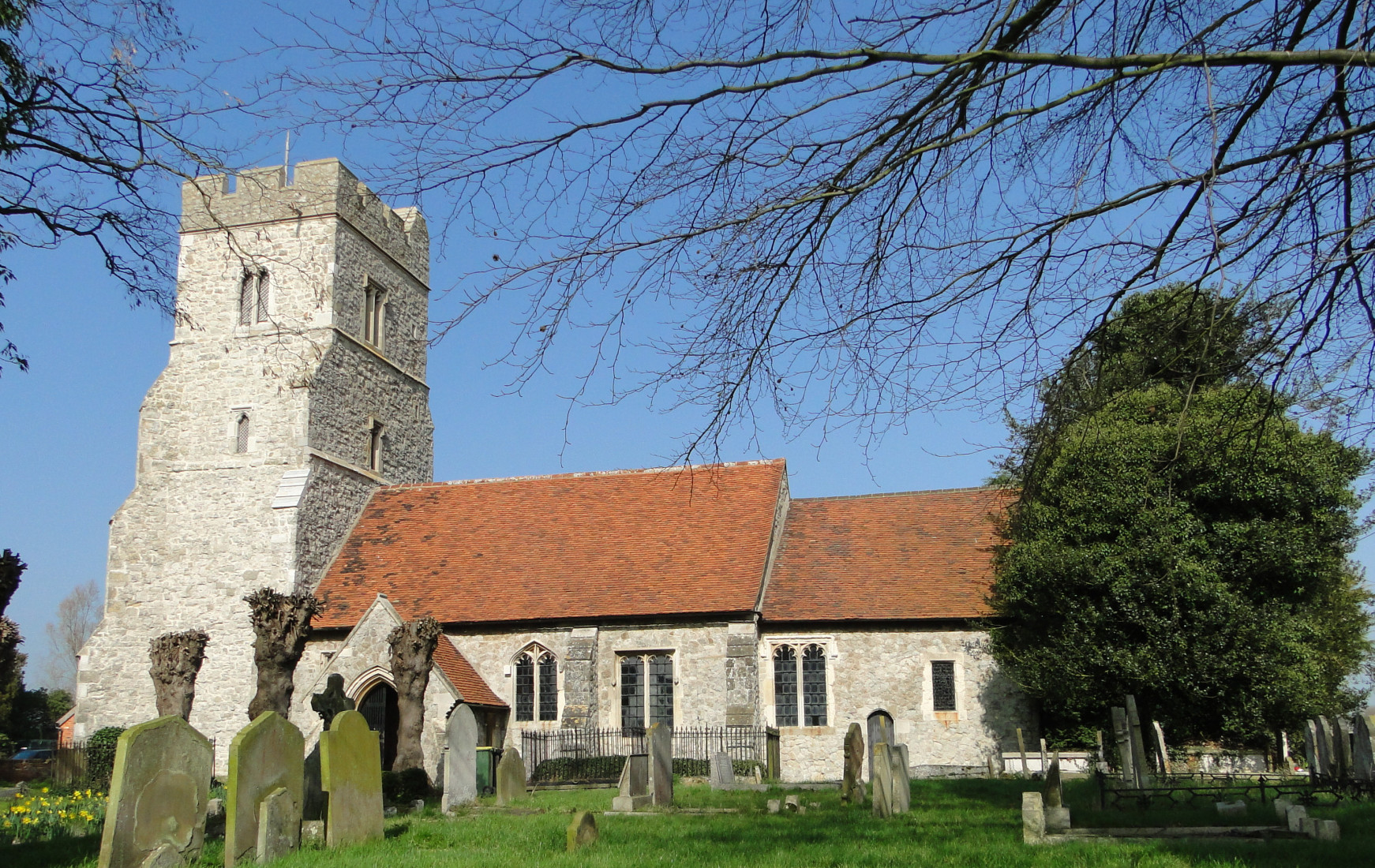
St Peter's Church, Paglesham

== Village sign ==
The Paglesham village sign which stands by the approach road was designed and made by resident Rodney Choppin in response to a general initiative to mark the Millennium by Rochford District Council, and the decision to commission a village sign was taken by the Parish Council. It was erected in September 2000. The sign is made from hardwood, hand-carved and then painted. The post is English Oak from Thetford Forest. The pictures represent the agricultural and seafaring traditions of the village. Flanking the Essex shield underneath, are a Pagle (or Cowslip), and an Oyster shell.

== Cultural references ==
The village was the focus of Julie Christie's character Betty Logan in the film Heaven Can Wait with Warren Beatty. It was also the setting for Garry Kilworth's children's novel The Raiders.
