= Great Stambridge =

Village in Essex, England

Coordinates: 51°35′37″N 0°44′32″E

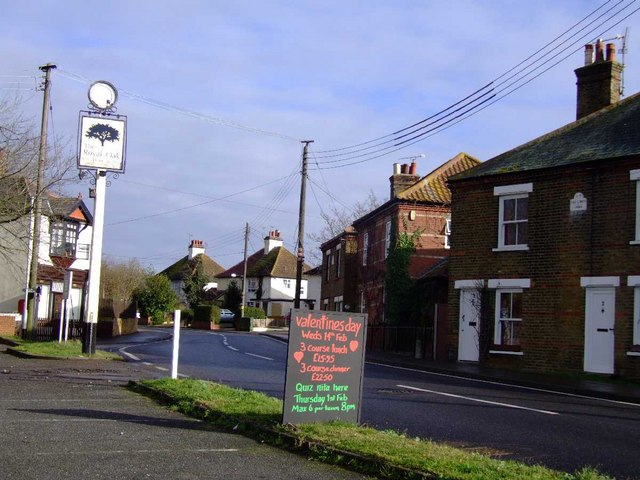

- Location within Essex
- OS grid reference: TQ899916
- Civil parish: Stambridge
- District: Rochford
- Shire county: Essex
- Region: East
- Country: England
- Sovereign state: United Kingdom
- Post town: ROCHFORD
- Postcode district: SS4
- Police: Essex
- Fire: Essex
- Ambulance: East of England

Great Stambridge is a village in the civil parish of Stambridge, in the Rochford District of Essex, England. The village lies 1.5 miles (2 km) east of Rochford, its post town, and 15 miles (24 km) south east of Chelmsford.

Great Stambridge and neighbouring Little Stambridge were historically separate parishes. They were merged into the single parish of Stambridge in 1934.

== Features ==
Great Stambridge has a church called St Mary and All Saints and a pub called The Royal Oak.

== History ==
The name "Stambridge" means 'Stone bridge'. Great Stambridge was recorded in the Domesday Book as Sanforda. Great Stambridge had 3 manors, Great Stambridge Hall, Hampton-Barns and Bretton. Great Stambridge was in the Rochford Hundred of Essex.

On 1 April 1934 the parish was merged with Little Stambridge to form a new civil parish called Stambridge. At the 1931 census (the last before the abolition of the civil parish), Great Stambridge had a population of 355.
