= Rochford District Council elections =

Local government elections in Essex, England

One third of Rochford District Council in Essex, England is elected each year, followed by one year where there is an election to Essex County Council.

== Council composition ==
Composition of the council
| Year | Conservative | Liberal Democrats (Note: Includes totals for the predecessors of the Liberal Democrats, the Liberal Party and SDP (both of which participated in the Alliance).) | Labour | Reform | Green | Rochford Residents | UKIP | Independents & Others | Council control after election |
|---|---|---|---|---|---|---|---|---|---|
Local government reorganisation; council established (40 seats)
| 1973 | 19 | 1 | 12 | – | – | – | – | 8 | No overall control |
New ward boundaries (40 seats)
| 1976 | 29 | 2 | 1 | – | 0 | – | – | 8 | Conservative |
| 1979 | 27 | 3 | 1 | – | 0 | – | – | 9 | Conservative |
| 1980 | 26 | 3 | 3 | – | 0 | – | – | 8 | Conservative |
| 1982 | 28 | 4 | 3 | – | 0 | – | – | 5 | Conservative |
| 1983 | 28 | 7 | 2 | – | 0 | – | – | 3 | Conservative |
| 1984 | 29 | 8 | 2 | – | 0 | – | – | 1 | Conservative |
| 1986 | 23 | 10 | 6 | – | 0 | – | – | 1 | Conservative |
| 1987 | 23 | 10 | 6 | – | 0 | – | – | 1 | Conservative |
| 1988 | 22 | 13 | 4 | – | 0 | – | – | 1 | Conservative |
| 1990 | 16 | 15 | 7 | – | 0 | – | – | 2 | No overall control |
| 1991 | 11 | 19 | 8 | – | 0 | – | – | 2 | No overall control |
| 1992 | 12 | 19 | 7 | – | 0 | – | – | 2 | No overall control |
| 1994 | 10 | 21 | 7 | – | 0 | – | 0 | 2 | Liberal Democrats |
| 1995 | 7 | 22 | 8 | – | 0 | – | 0 | 3 | Liberal Democrats |
| 1996 | 1 | 23 | 11 | – | 0 | – | 0 | 4 | Liberal Democrats |
| 1998 | 6 | 18 | 12 | – | 0 | 3 | 0 | 1 | No overall control |
| 1999 | 11 | 13 | 12 | – | 0 | 3 | 0 | 1 | No overall control |
| 2000 | 19 | 9 | 9 | – | 0 | 2 | 0 | 1 | No overall control |
New ward boundaries (39 seats)
| 2002 | 28 | 4 | 4 | – | 0 | 1 | 0 | 2 | Conservative |
| 2003 | 31 | 4 | 2 | – | 0 | 1 | 0 | 1 | Conservative |
| 2004 | 32 | 4 | 1 | – | 0 | 1 | 0 | 1 | Conservative |
| 2006 | 34 | 4 | 0 | – | 0 | 1 | 0 | 0 | Conservative |
| 2007 | 32 | 5 | 0 | – | 0 | 1 | 0 | 1 | Conservative |
| 2008 | 32 | 5 | 0 | – | 0 | 1 | 0 | 1 | Conservative |
| 2010 | 31 | 5 | 0 | – | 1 | 1 | 0 | 1 | Conservative |
| 2011 | 32 | 4 | 0 | – | 1 | 2 | 0 | 0 | Conservative |
| 2012 | 31 | 4 | 0 | – | 2 | 2 | 0 | 0 | Conservative |
| 2014 | 28 | 3 | 1 | – | 2 | 2 | 3 | 0 | Conservative |
| 2015 | 29 | 2 | 1 | – | 2 | 2 | 3 | 0 | Conservative |
New ward boundaries (39 seats)
| 2016 | 21 | 4 | 0 | – | 3 | 6 | 4 | 1 | Conservative |
| 2018 | 32 | 3 | 0 | – | 3 | 5 | 3 | 1 | Conservative |
| 2019 | 26 | 3 | 0 | – | 3 | 4 | 0 | 3 | Conservative |
| 2021 | 27 | 3 | 0 | 0 | 1 | 6 | 0 | 2 | Conservative |
| 2022 | 21 | 5 | 0 | 0 | 1 | 10 | 0 | 2 | Conservative |
| 2023 | 14 | 8 | 0 | 0 | 1 | 7 | 0 | 9 | No overall control |
| 2024 | 10 | 11 | 0 | 0 | 1 | 8 | 0 | 9 | No overall control |
| 2026 | 7 | 5 | 0 | 13 | 0 | 4 | 0 | 10 | No overall control |

== Results maps ==
2002 results map

2003 results map

2004 results map

2006 results map

2007 results map

2008 results map

2010 results map

2011 results map

2012 results map

2014 results map

2015 results map

2016 results map

2018 results map

2019 results map

2021 results map

2022 results map

2023 results map

2024 results map

2026 results map

== By-election results ==
=== 1994-1998 ===
Roche By-Election 14 November 1996
| Party | Candidate | Votes | % | ±% |
|---|---|---|---|---|
| Labour | | 317 | 50.2 | |
| Liberal Democrats | | 174 | 27.5 | |
| Conservative | | 141 | 22.3 | |
| Majority | | 143 | 22.7 | |
| Turnout | | 632 | | |
| Labour hold | | Swing | | |

Barling & Sutton By-Election 5 December 1996
| Party | Candidate | Votes | % | ±% |
|---|---|---|---|---|
| Independent | | 155 | 51.7 | |
| Labour | | 124 | 41.3 | |
| Liberal Democrats | | 21 | 7.0 | |
| Majority | | 31 | 10.4 | |
| Turnout | | 300 | 21.8 | |
| Independent hold | | Swing | | |

Hawkwell West By-Election 6 November 1997
| Party | Candidate | Votes | % | ±% |
|---|---|---|---|---|
| Labour | | 257 | 40.4 | −1.5 |
| Resident | | 194 | 30.5 | |
| Conservative | | 185 | 29.1 | +7.3 |
| Majority | | 63 | 9.9 | |
| Turnout | | 636 | | |
| Labour hold | | Swing | | |

=== 1998-2002 ===
Roche By-Election 30 August 2001
| Party | Candidate | Votes | % | ±% |
|---|---|---|---|---|
| Labour | | 241 | 44.5 | −21.8 |
| Conservative | | 233 | 43.1 | +9.4 |
| Liberal Democrats | | 45 | 8.3 | +8.3 |
| Independent | | 22 | 4.1 | +4.1 |
| Majority | | 8 | 1.4 | |
| Turnout | | 541 | 26.9 | |
| Labour hold | | Swing | | |

=== 2002-2006 ===
Sweyne Park By-Election 14 July 2005
| Party | Candidate | Votes | % | ±% |
|---|---|---|---|---|
| Conservative | Joan Mockford | 310 | 59.9 | |
| Liberal Democrats | Lindsay Frend | 112 | 21.6 | |
| Labour | Stephen Hinde | 95 | 18.4 | |
| Majority | | 198 | 38.3 | |
| Turnout | | 517 | 15.8 | |
| Conservative hold | | Swing | | |

=== 2006-2010 ===
Hockley North By-Election 14 June 2007
| Party | Candidate | Votes | % | ±% |
|---|---|---|---|---|
| Conservative | Michael Carter | 297 | 49.5 | −27.3 |
| BNP | Mark Cooling | 176 | 29.3 | +29.3 |
| Liberal Democrats | Mark Pearson | 127 | 21.2 | +21.2 |
| Majority | | 121 | 20.2 | |
| Turnout | | 600 | 36.6 | |
| Conservative hold | | Swing | | |

=== 2010-2014 ===
Hullbridge By-election, 16 June 2011
| Party | Candidate | Votes | % | ±% |
|---|---|---|---|---|
| Green | Diane Hoy | 757 | 48.22 | |
| Conservative | Mark Peter Hale | 555 | 35.35 | |
| Labour | Angelina Donna Marriott | 182 | 11.59 | |
| UKIP | Carl Whitwell | 76 | 4.84 | |
| Majority | | 202 | 12.87 | |
| Turnout | | 1570 | 29.01 | |
| Green gain from Conservative | | Swing | | |

Rayleigh Central By-election, 1 December 2011
| Party | Candidate | Votes | % | ±% |
|---|---|---|---|---|
| Conservative | Cheryl Edwina Roe | 406 | 54.8 | |
| English Democrat | John Hayter | 218 | 29.4 | |
| Liberal Democrats | Elena Black | 117 | 15.8 | |
| Majority | | 188 | 25.37 | |
| Turnout | | 741 | 22.03 | |
| Conservative hold | | Swing | | |

Hawkwell North By-election, 2 May 2013
| Party | Candidate | Votes | % | ±% |
|---|---|---|---|---|
| Conservative | Lesley Butcher | 372 | 37.6 | −33.5 |
| UKIP | Keith Gibbs | 311 | 31.4 | +31.4 |
| Independent | Arthur Williams | 173 | 17.5 | +17.5 |
| Labour | John Jefferies | 133 | 13.4 | −15.5 |
| Majority | | 61 | 6.2 | |
| Turnout | | 989 | | |
| Conservative hold | | Swing | | |

Whitehouse By-election, 2 May 2013
| Party | Candidate | Votes | % | ±% |
|---|---|---|---|---|
| Conservative | Robin Dray | 408 | 43.1 | −29.4 |
| UKIP | Linda Kendall | 401 | 42.4 | +42.4 |
| Labour | David Bodimeade | 137 | 14.5 | −13.0 |
| Majority | | 7 | 0.7 | |
| Turnout | | 946 | | |
| Conservative hold | | Swing | | |

=== 2014-2018 ===
Downhall and Rawreth By-election, 18 January 2018
| Party | Candidate | Votes | % | ±% |
|---|---|---|---|---|
| Liberal Democrats | Craig Cannell | 794 | 77.0 | +16.6 |
| Conservative | Tony Hollis | 237 | 23.0 | +6.4 |
| Majority | | 557 | 54.0 | |
| Turnout | | 1,031 | | |
| Liberal Democrats hold | | Swing | | |

=== 2018-2022 ===
Downhall and Rawreth By-election, 3 March 2022
| Party | Candidate | Votes | % | ±% |
|---|---|---|---|---|
| Liberal Democrats | Jim Cripps | 791 | 71.5 | +9.6 |
| Conservative | Danielle Belton | 265 | 23.9 | −5.4 |
| Labour | Lorraine Ridley | 51 | 4.6 | −4.1 |
| Majority | | 526 | 47.5 | |
| Turnout | | 1,107 | | |
| Liberal Democrats hold | | Swing | | |

=== 2026-2030 ===
Sweyne Park and Grange By-election, 18 June 2026
| Party | Candidate | Votes | % | ±% |
|---|---|---|---|---|
| Conservative | Danielle Belton | 1,049 | 56.1 | |
| Reform | Paul Thurgood | 464 | 24.8 | |
| Liberal Democrats | Dawn Balding | 247 | 13.2 | |
| Green | Liam Lonergan | 78 | 4.2 | |
| Labour | Lorraine Ridley | 31 | 1.7 | |
| Majority | | 585 | 31.3 | |
| Turnout | | 1,869 | | |
| Conservative gain from Reform | | Swing | | |
