= 2027 Rochford District Council election =

2027 English local government election

- 6 May 2027

13 out of 39 seats to Rochford District Council 20 seats needed for a majority
Leader	Adi Malviya	(Note: Arthur Williams is the leader of the Rochford, Foulness & Wakering Independents group. Richard Linden is the leader of the Associated Independents group.)	Danielle Belton
Party	Reform	Independent	Conservative
Leader's seat	Wheatley		Sweyne Park & Grange
Last election	13 seats, 40.8%	10 seats, 4.6%	7 seats, 23.9%
Current seats	12	10 (Note: Of the 10 Independents before the election, 4 sat in the Rochford, Foulness & Wakering Independents group, 3 sat in the Associated Independents group, 3 sat in the Liberal Democrats & Independents group, and 1 was non-aligned.)	8
Leader	James Newport (Note: Leader of the Liberal Democrats & Independents group.)	Nick Booth
Party	Liberal Democrats	Rochford Resident
Leader's seat	Downhall & Rawreth	Hawkwell West
Last election	5 seats, 14.4%	4 seats, 2.2%
Current seats	5	3
Incumbent Leader
Adi Malviya
Reform
No overall control (Note: Reform minority.)

The 2027 Rochford District Council election will be held on 6 May 2027 to elect members of Rochford District Council in Essex, England. This will be on the same day as other local elections held across the United Kingdom.

== Background ==
=== Local government reorganisation ===
Due to proposed structural changes to local government in England, the 2026 election was intended to be the final election to the council before it was abolished and replaced by South East Essex Council, a unitary authority. However, on 7 September 2026, the government announced it was withdrawing plans for the planned restructuring pending review. Following this announcement, local elections due to be held in 2027 under the existing local electoral calendar would proceed.

== Summary ==
=== Election result ===
2026 Rochford District Council election
Party	This election				Full council			This election		
Party	Candidates	Seats	Net	Seats %	Other	Total	Total %	Votes	Votes %	+/−
Reform					11					
Independent					6					
Conservative					4					
Liberal Democrats					3					
Rochford Resident					1					

=== Incumbents ===
Ward	Incumbent councillor	Affiliation	Re-standing
Downhall & Rawreth	James Newport	Liberal Democrats	
Foulness & The Wakerings	Daniel Efde	Conservative	
Hawkwell East	Robert Reid (Note: Elected at the 2026 Hawkwell East by-election.)	Reform	
Hawkwell West	Nick Booth	Rochford Resident	
Hockley	Adrian Eves	Rochford Resident	
Hockley & Ashingdon	Michael Carter	Conservative	
Hullbridge	Tracey Knight	Independent	
Lodge	Ian Ward	Conservative	
Roche North & Rural	Simon Wootton	Conservative	
Roche South	Arthur Williams (Note: Originally elected as a Conversative, but later left the party to sit as an independent. He sits in the Rochford, Foulness & Wakering Independents group.)	Independent	
Sweyne Park & Grange	Elizabeth Brewer	Liberal Democrats	
Trinity	Sarah Page (Note: Originally elected as a Liberal Democrat, but later left the party to sit as an independent. Sits as part of the Associated Independents group.)	Independent	
Wheatley	Richard Linden	Independent	
