= 1999 Rochford District Council election =

1999 UK local government election

← 1998	6 May 1999	2000 →

13 out of 40 seats on the Rochford District Council 21 seats needed for a majority
	First party	Second party	Third party
Party	Conservative	Liberal Democrats	Labour
Last election	4	4	5
Seats before	6	18	12
Seats won	6	3	3
Seats after	11	13	12
Seat change	▲5	▼5	Steady
Popular vote	4,592	3,444	2,489
Percentage	41.4%	31.0%	22.4%
	Fourth party	Fifth party
Party	Independent	Residents
Last election	N/A	1
Seats before	1	3
Seats won	1	N/A
Seats after	1	3
Seat change	Steady	Steady
Popular vote	573	N/A
Percentage	5.2%	N/A

Elections to Rochford Council, Essex, England, were held on 6 May 1999. One third of the council was up for election and the council stayed under no overall control.

After the election, the composition of the council was:

- Liberal Democrat 13
- Labour 12
- Conservative 11
- Residents 3
- Independent 1

== Election results ==
1999 Rochford District Council election
Party	This election			Full council			This election		
Party	Seats	Net	Seats %	Other	Total	Total %	Votes	Votes %	+/−
Liberal Democrats	3	▼5	23.1	10	13	32.5	3,444	31.0	
Labour	3	Steady	23.1	9	12	30.0	2,489	22.4	
Conservative	6	▲5	46.2	5	11	27.5	4,592	41.4	
Residents	0	Steady	0.0	3	3	7.5	0	0.0	
Independent	1	Steady	7.7	0	1	2.5	573	5.2	

== Ward results ==
=== Ashingdon ===
Ashingdon
Party	Candidate	Votes	%	±%
Conservative	T. Cutmore	294	41.4	
Liberal Democrats	C. Hall	289	40.6	
Labour	L. Bain	128	18.0	
Majority			0.8	
Turnout			29.7	
Conservative gain from Liberal Democrats		Swing		

=== Barling & Sutton ===
Barling & Sutton
Party	Candidate	Votes	%	±%
Independent	R. Allen	217	45.0	
Conservative	A. Waite	174	36.1	
Labour	K. Salt	77	16.0	
Liberal Democrats	M. Smith	14	2.9	
Majority			8.9	
Turnout			35.2	
Independent hold		Swing		

=== Canewdon ===
Canewdon
Party	Candidate	Votes	%	±%
Liberal Democrats	A. Hosking	333	51.1	
Conservative	R. Bailey	234	35.9	
Labour	K. Attridge	85	13.0	
Majority			15.2	
Turnout			34.8	
Liberal Democrats hold		Swing		

=== Foulness & Great Wakering East ===
Foulness & Great Wakering East
Party	Candidate	Votes	%	±%
Conservative	R. Pearson	363	64.6	
Labour	A. Fox	176	31.3	
Liberal Democrats	M. Hunnable	23	4.1	
Majority			33.3	
Turnout			33.3	
Conservative hold		Swing		

=== Grange & Rawreth ===
Grange & Rawreth
Party	Candidate	Votes	%	±%
Conservative	G. Mockford	582	40.0	
Liberal Democrats	E. Francis	461	31.7	
Labour	D. Rossi	413	28.4	
Majority			8.3	
Turnout			28.8	
Conservative gain from Liberal Democrats		Swing		

=== Great Wakering Central ===
Great Wakering Central
Party	Candidate	Votes	%	±%
Labour	P. Stebbing	230	44.1	
Conservative	J. Shelley	190	36.5	
Independent	H. Allen	81	15.5	
Liberal Democrats	M. Beckers	20	3.8	
Majority			7.6	
Turnout			38.4	
Labour hold		Swing		

=== Great Wakering West ===
Great Wakering West
Party	Candidate	Votes	%	±%
Labour	G. Fox	207	52.8	
Conservative	B. Wilkins	166	42.3	
Liberal Democrats	D. Giles	19	4.8	
Majority			10.5	
Turnout			31.7	
Labour hold		Swing		

=== Hawkwell East ===
Hawkwell East
Party	Candidate	Votes	%	±%
Liberal Democrats	V. Leach	607	44.6	
Conservative	J. Spillane	474	34.8	
Labour	D. Thompson	281	20.6	
Majority			9.8	
Turnout			23.9	
Liberal Democrats hold		Swing		

=== Hawkwell West ===
Hawkwell West
Party	Candidate	Votes	%	±%
Labour	M. Weir	430	42.3	
Independent	J. Mason	275	27.0	
Conservative	P. Capon	269	26.5	
Liberal Democrats	M. Pearson	42	4.2	
Majority			15.3	
Turnout			33.3	
Labour hold		Swing		

=== Lodge ===
Lodge
Party	Candidate	Votes	%	±%
Conservative	T. Livings	537	49.9	
Liberal Democrats	V. Howlett	416	37.5	
Labour	S. Walton	156	14.1	
Majority			12.4	
Turnout			24.3	
Conservative gain from Liberal Democrats		Swing		

=== Trinity ===
Trinity
Party	Candidate	Votes	%	±%
Conservative	J. Grey	436	49.9	
Liberal Democrats	P. Pearse	316	36.2	
Labour	J. Fielding	121	13.9	
Majority			13.7	
Turnout			30.2	
Conservative gain from Liberal Democrats		Swing		

=== Wheatley ===
Wheatley
Party	Candidate	Votes	%	±%
Conservative	C. Langlands	444	48.0	
Liberal Democrats	P. Lock	401	43.4	
Labour	D. Randall	80	8.6	
Majority			4.6	
Turnout			39.6	
Conservative gain from Liberal Democrats		Swing		

=== Whitehouse ===
Whitehouse
Party	Candidate	Votes	%	±%
Liberal Democrats	J. Giles	503	48.5	
Conservative	V. Keenan	429	41.4	
Labour	A. Popplewell	105	10.1	
Majority			7.1	
Turnout			38.2	
Liberal Democrats hold		Swing		
