= 2019 Rochford District Council election =

Local election in Rochford, England

The 2019 Rochford District Council election took place on 2 May 2019, to elect members of Rochford District Council in England. This was on the same day as other local elections.

== Results summary ==
Map showing the winner in each ward for the 2019 Rochford District Council election

2019 Rochford District Council election
Party	This election			Full council			This election		
Party	Seats	Net	Seats %	Other	Total	Total %	Votes	Votes %	+/−
Conservative	8	▲1	61.5	18	26	66.7	7,268	38.2	▼9.3
Rochford Resident	2	Steady	15.4	2	4	10.3	3,435	18.1	▲0.7
Liberal Democrats	1	Steady	7.7	2	3	7.7	2,489	13.1	▲1.3
Green	1	Steady	7.7	2	3	7.7	1,794	9.4	▲3.5
Independent	1	▲1	7.7	2	3	7.7	1,225	6.4	▲5.8
Labour	0	Steady	0.0	0	0	0.0	2,151	11.3	▼2.7
UKIP	0	▼2	0.0	0	0	0.0	447	2.3	New
For Britain	0	Steady	0.0	0	0	0.0	218	1.1	New

No Friends of Rochford (-3.8) candidates as previous.

== Ward results ==
=== Downhall & Rawreth ===
Downhall & Rawreth
Party	Candidate	Votes	%	±%
Liberal Democrats	James Newport	1,011	70.0	▲6.1
Conservative	Keith Podd	315	21.8	▼5.5
Labour	Shaun Cain	118	8.2	▼0.6
Majority		696	48.2	
Turnout		1444	29.0	▲0.2
Liberal Democrats hold		Swing		

=== Foulness & The Wakerings ===
Foulness & The Wakerings
Party	Candidate	Votes	%	±%
Conservative	Daniel Efde	unopposed		
Conservative gain from UKIP		Swing		

=== Hawkwell East ===
Hawkwell East
Party	Candidate	Votes	%	±%
Conservative	Michael Webb	647	47.4	▲1.7
Rochford Resident	Stephen Hinde	540	39.5	0.0
Labour	Roger Gardner	171	13.1	▼1.6
Majority		107	7.9	▲1.7
Turnout		1358	29.0	▼0.3
Conservative hold		Swing		

=== Hawkwell West ===
Hawkwell West
Party	Candidate	Votes	%	±%
Rochford Resident	Toni Carter	862	52.6	▲12.9
Conservative	Ian Foster	653	39.9	▼8.3
Labour	David Lench	123	7.5	▼7.3
Majority		209	16.3	
Turnout		2738	33.0	0.0
Rochford Resident hold		Swing		

=== Hockley ===
Hockley
Party	Candidate	Votes	%	±%
Rochford Resident	Adrian Eves	880	53.0	▲19.6
Conservative	Eileen Gadson	486	29.3	▼11.7
UKIP	Peter Willis	151	9.1	
Labour	Louise Best	142	8.6	▼2.1
Majority		394	23.7	
Turnout		1659	33.0	▲0.9
Rochford Resident hold		Swing		

=== Hockley & Ashingdon ===
Hockley & Ashingdon
Party	Candidate	Votes	%	±%
Conservative	Mike Carter	589	38.0	▼10.2
Independent	David Cathchpole	393	25.3	
Liberal Democrats	Nicola O'Riordan Finley	352	22.7	
Labour	Stephen Willis	114	7.4	▼1.3
For Britain	Craig Sohail	103	6.6	
Majority		196	12.7	
Turnout		1551	30.0	▼1.7
Conservative hold		Swing		

=== Hullbridge ===
Hullbridge
Party	Candidate	Votes	%	±%
Green	Diane Hoy	1,473	76.2	▲12.0
Conservative	Angelina Marriott	370	19.2	▼9.7
Labour	Victoria Williams	89	4.6	▼2.3
Majority		1,103	57.0	
Turnout		1932	36.0	▼1.1
Green hold		Swing		

=== Lodge ===
Lodge
Party	Candidate	Votes	%	±%
Conservative	Ian Ward	835	46.6	▼9.1
Rochford Resident	Richard Lambourne	788	44.0	▼0.3
Labour	Roger Neville	168	9.4	
Majority		47	2.6	
Turnout		1791	34.0	▼0.3
Conservative hold		Swing		

=== Roche North & Rural ===
Roche North & Rural
Party	Candidate	Votes	%	±%
Conservative	Simon Wooton	532	38.7	▼9.5
Rochford Resident	Phil Capon	365	26.6	
Labour	David Flack	362	26.5	▼5.0
For Britain	Miryam Sohail	115	8.4	
Majority		1374	12.1	
Turnout		1367	28.0	▲0.6
Conservative gain from UKIP		Swing		

=== Roche South ===
Roche South
Party	Candidate	Votes	%	±%
Conservative	Arthur Williams	475	39.6	▼5.1
UKIP	Shaun Holmes	296	24.7	
Labour	Ian Challis	285	23.8	▼2.0
Liberal Democrats	Derek Brown	142	11.9	
Majority		179	14.9	
Turnout		1198	28.0	▼1.2
Conservative hold		Swing		

=== Sweyne Park & Grange ===
Sweyne Park & Grange
Party	Candidate	Votes	%	±%
Conservative	June Lumley	702	49.4	▲0.6
Liberal Democrats	Lisa Newport	538	37.9	▼0.8
Labour	Conner Agius	180	12.7	▲0.2
Majority		164	11.5	
Turnout		1420	29.0	▼3.1
Conservative hold		Swing		

=== Trinity ===
Trinity
Party	Candidate	Votes	%	±%
Conservative	Cheryl Roe	990	51.7	▼13.1
Liberal Democrats	Ian Oakley	446	23.3	▲2.3
Green	Jill Waight	321	16.8	
Labour	Samantha Reed	158	8.3	▼0.4
Majority		544	28.4	
Turnout		1915	35.0	▼2.3
Conservative hold		Swing		

=== Wheatley ===
Wheatley
Party	Candidate	Votes	%	±%
Independent	Michael Wilkinson	832	47.8	
Conservative	Steve Cooper	674	38.8	▼25.5
Labour	Stephen Cooper	233	13.4	▼5.4
Majority		158	9.0	
Turnout		1739	34.0	▼1.0
Independent gain from Conservative		Swing		
