= Shopland =

Hamlet in Essex, England

Coordinates: 51.5608°N 0.7370°E

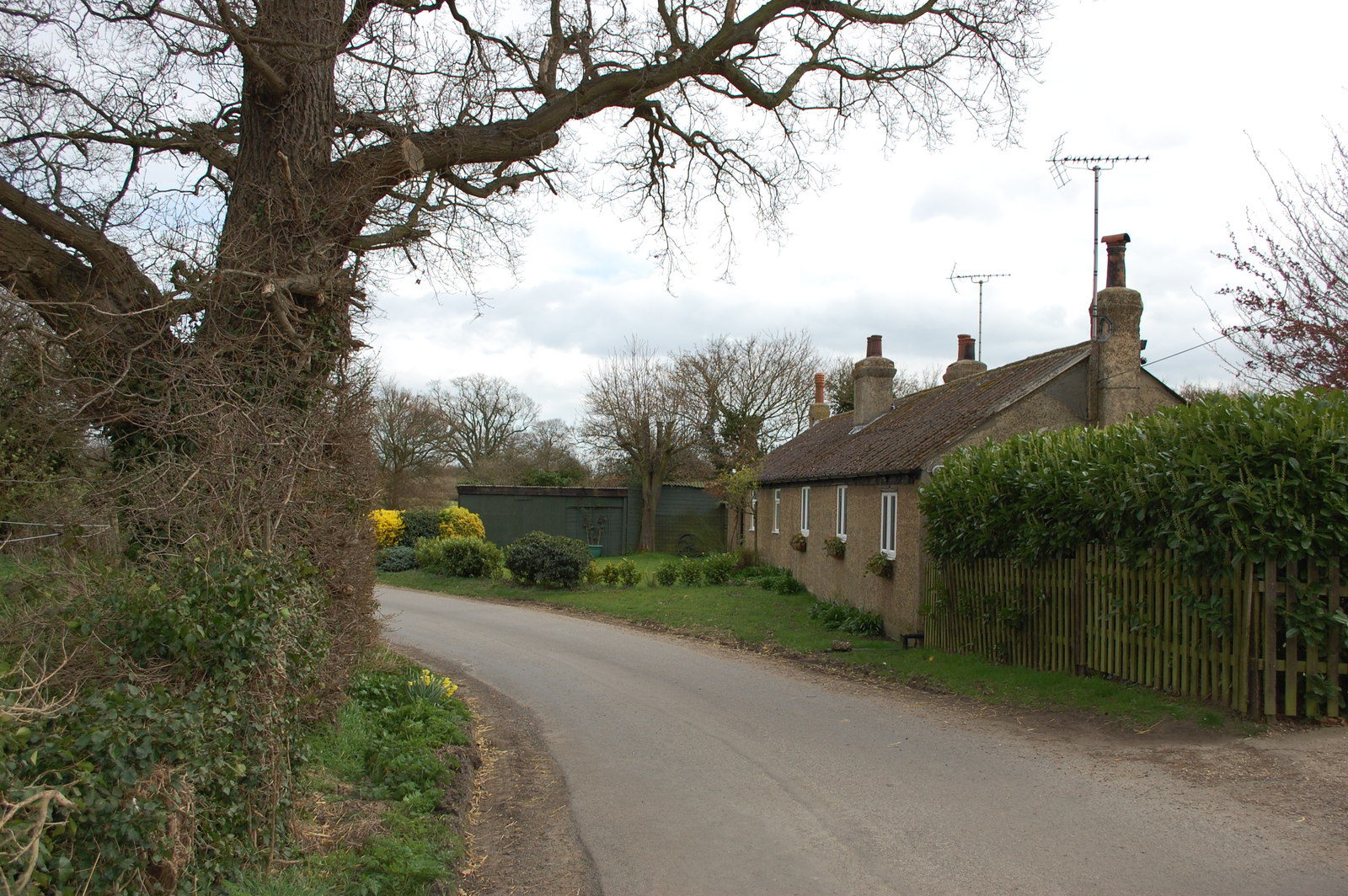
- Cottage near Butler's Farm

- Location within Essex
- Civil parish: Sutton
- District: Rochford
- Shire county: Essex
- Region: East
- Country: England
- Sovereign state: United Kingdom
- Post town: ROCHFORD
- Postcode district: SS4

Shopland is a hamlet in the civil parish of Sutton in the Rochford District of Essex, England. It lies 2 miles (3 km) south-east of Rochford, its post town, and a similar distance north-east of the centre of Southend-on-Sea. Shopland was formerly a parish; the ecclesiastical parish formed a united benefice with Sutton from 1893, and the civil parish was abolished in 1933 when most of its area absorbed into Sutton, apart from a smaller section at the southern end of the parish which went instead to Southend. Shopland's parish church suffered damage during the Second World War and was subsequently demolished in 1957.

== History ==
The name Shopland means "island with a shed", coming from the Old English word sceoppa meaning a shop, booth or shed. The name appears as Scopingland in a list of c. 1000 AD of the manors of St Paul's Cathedral held at Corpus Christi College, Cambridge (MS. 383), and as Scopiland in Feet of Fines records from 1208.

In the Domesday Book of 1086 it is listed as Scopelanda when it formed an estate or manor owned by Eustace, Count of Boulogne, and formed part of the Rochford Hundred of Essex.

No church or priest is mentioned in the Domesday Book, but the manor of Shopland came to be a parish. Its parish church, dedicated to Mary Magdalene, was built in the 13th century, and stood to the north-east of the manor house of Shopland Hall. The northern boundary of the parish was the River Roach.

From 1893, the ecclesiastical parish of Shopland formed a united benefice with neighbouring Sutton, sharing a priest.

Shopland's church became dilapidated in the first half of the 20th century. The final service was held there in 1940. A land mine exploded 150 yards (137 m) from the building during the Second World War, and other bombs exploded nearby, further weakening the structure. The building was not repaired and it was eventually demolished in 1957.

When elected parish and district councils were established in 1894, Shopland was included in the Rochford Rural District. The population of the parish was too small for it to be given a parish council, and so it had a parish meeting instead. The civil parish was abolished in 1933. The majority of the area, including the hamlet around Shopland Hall, was absorbed into the parish of Sutton. A southern strip of the parish was transferred instead to Southend-on-Sea. At the 1931 census (the last before the abolition of the civil parish), Shopland had a population of 81.

The modern parish council for Sutton calls itself "Sutton with Shopland Parish Council" and describes Shopland as being one of the two hamlets in the parish.
