= 1976 Rochford District Council election =

1976 English local election

- 6 May 1976

All 40 seats to Rochford District Council 21 seats needed for a majority

	First party	Second party	Third party
Party	Conservative	Independent	Residents
Seats won	29	5	3
Seat change	▲10	▼1	▲1
Popular vote	23,586	3,096	1,865
Percentage	56.3%	7.4%	4.4%
Swing	▲12.6%	▼3.7%	▲1.0%
	Fourth party	Fifth party
Party	Liberal	Labour
Seats won	2	1
Seat change	▲1	▼11
Popular vote	5,182	8,183
Percentage	12.4%	19.5%
Swing	▲11.2%	▼21.1%
Council control before election
No overall control
Council control after election
Conservative

The 1976 Rochford District Council election took place on 6 May 1976 to elect members of Rochford District Council in Essex, England. This was on the same day as other local elections.

== Summary ==
=== Election result ===
1976 Rochford District Council election
Party	Candidates	Seats	Gains	Losses	Net gain/loss	Seats %	Votes %	Votes	+/−
Conservative	40	29	12	2	▲10	72.5	56.3	23,586	+12.6
Independent	9	5	1	2	▼1	12.5	7.4	3,096	–3.7
Residents	3	3	1	0	▲1	7.5	4.4	1,865	+1.0
Liberal	17	2	1	0	▲1	5.0	12.4	5,182	+11.2
Labour	26	1	0	11	▼11	2.5	19.5	8,183	–21.1

== Ward results ==
Incumbent councillors standing for re-election are marked with an asterisk (*).

=== Ashingdon ===
Ashingdon (2 seats)
Party	Candidate	Votes	%	±%
Conservative	D. Boothby	343	41.7	
Liberal	B. Crick*	316	38.4	
Conservative	E. Quincy	303	36.8	
Liberal	N. Drayton-Thomas	184	22.4	
Independent	B. Banfield	144	17.5	
Labour	F. Denny	119	14.5	
Labour	R. Marshall	117	14.2	
Turnout		~823	41.8	
Registered electors		1,968		
Conservative gain from Independent				
Liberal hold				

=== Barling & Sutton ===
Barling & Sutton
Party	Candidate	Votes	%	±%
Conservative	C. Appleyard	347	59.7	
Labour	M. Cowen*	234	40.3	
Majority		113	19.4	
Turnout		581	53.9	
Registered electors		1,084		
Conservative gain from Labour		Swing		

=== Canewdon ===
Canewdon
Party	Candidate	Votes	%	±%
Independent	D. Wood*	486	68.6	
Conservative	O. Perry	222	31.4	
Majority		264	37.3	
Turnout		708	45.4	
Registered electors		1,605		
Independent hold		Swing		

=== Downhall ===
Downhall (2 seats)
Party	Candidate	Votes	%	±%
Conservative	D. Ives*	940	75.3	
Conservative	L. Cope	922	73.8	
Liberal	N. Chitty	280	22.4	
Liberal	T. Jones	273	21.9	
Turnout		~1,249	53.1	
Registered electors		2,353		
Conservative hold				
Conservative hold				

=== Foulness & Great Wakering East ===
Foulness & Great Wakering East
Party	Candidate	Votes	%	±%
Independent	A. Humby*	235	37.8	
Labour	W. Lay	208	33.5	
Conservative	J. Rundlett	178	28.7	
Majority		27	4.3	
Turnout		621	54.3	
Registered electors		1,158		
Independent hold		Swing		

=== Grange & Rawreth ===
Grange & Rawreth (3 seats)
Party	Candidate	Votes	%	±%
Conservative	E. Heath	895	56.9	
Conservative	P. Philpot	895	56.9	
Conservative	M. Anderson	851	54.1	
Labour	C. Gowlett*	596	37.9	
Labour	R. McCamley*	575	36.6	
Labour	R. Needham*	520	33.1	
Turnout		~1,572	49.4	
Registered electors		3,183		
Conservative gain from Labour				
Conservative gain from Labour				
Conservative gain from Labour				

=== Great Wakering Central ===
Great Wakering Central
Party	Candidate	Votes	%	±%
Labour	J. Warner*	367	59.8	
Conservative	R. Pearson	247	40.2	
Majority		120	19.5	
Turnout		614	53.7	
Registered electors		1,161		
Labour hold		Swing		

=== Great Wakering West ===
Great Wakering West
Party	Candidate	Votes	%	±%
Independent	E. Adcock*	262	49.9	
Conservative	F. Jopson	146	27.8	
Labour	D. Lay	117	22.3	
Majority		116	22.1	
Turnout		525	50.4	
Registered electors		1,046		
Independent hold		Swing		

=== Hawkwell East ===
Hawkwell East (3 seats)
Party	Candidate	Votes	%	±%
Conservative	E. Maton*	974	64.7	
Conservative	A. Harvey*	973	64.7	
Conservative	J. Sheaf	963	64.0	
Independent	J. Nokes	278	18.5	
Labour	C. Spearman	272	18.1	
Labour	A. Schofield	256	17.0	
Labour	J. Chittenden	249	16.5	
Liberal	M. Clark	217	14.4	
Turnout		~1,505	38.5	
Registered electors		3,910		
Conservative hold				
Conservative hold				
Conservative gain from Labour				

=== Hawkwell West ===
Hawkwell West (2 seats)
Party	Candidate	Votes	%	±%
Conservative	A. Tate*	749	67.4	
Conservative	R. Fawell	713	64.1	
Liberal	C. Pohl	208	18.7	
Labour	H. Horsman	175	15.7	
Labour	G. Tasker	173	15.6	
Turnout		~1,112	39.9	
Registered electors		2,787		
Conservative hold				
Conservative hold				

=== Hockley Central ===
Hockley Central
Party	Candidate	Votes	%	±%
Conservative	M. Kennaugh*	335	58.2	
Liberal	P. Homer	241	41.8	
Majority		94	16.3	
Turnout		576	41.2	
Registered electors		1,449		
Conservative hold		Swing		

=== Hockley East ===
Hockley East (2 seats)
Party	Candidate	Votes	%	±%
Residents	J. Browning*	772	67.2	
Residents	S. Barnard*	762	66.3	
Conservative	E. Hopkins	345	30.0	
Conservative	R. Frith	340	29.6	
Turnout		~1,149	38.1	
Registered electors		3,017		
Residents hold				
Residents hold				

=== Hockley West ===
Hockley West
Party	Candidate	Votes	%	±%
Conservative	J. Jones	476	85.2	
Liberal	J. Ralph	83	14.8	
Majority		393	70.3	
Turnout		559	44.0	
Registered electors		1,308		
Conservative hold		Swing		

=== Hullbridge Riverside ===
Hullbridge Riverside (2 seats)
Party	Candidate	Votes	%	±%
Conservative	F. Hunt	529	48.8	
Conservative	G. Gilbert	503	46.4	
Labour	M. Madden*	496	45.8	
Labour	C. Morgan*	464	46.4	
Turnout		~1,083	44.5	
Registered electors		2,433		
Conservative gain from Labour				
Conservative gain from Labour				

=== Hullbridge South ===
Hullbridge South (2 seats)
Party	Candidate	Votes	%	±%
Independent	J. Campbell-Carter*	569	61.1	
Residents	L. Davey	331	35.6	
Independent	E. Long	154	16.5	
Labour	G. Madden	146	15.7	
Conservative	J. Steward	141	15.1	
Conservative	R. Blower	135	14.5	
Labour	G. Young*	122	13.1	
Turnout		~931	45.8	
Registered electors		2,032		
Independent hold				
Residents gain from Labour				

=== Lodge ===
Lodge (3 seats)
Party	Candidate	Votes	%	±%
Conservative	C. Clayton	1,027	51.6	
Conservative	C. Bright	1,026	51.6	
Conservative	J. Foster	1,019	51.2	
Labour	L. Campbell	475	23.9	
Liberal	P. Hann	435	21.9	
Liberal	C. Holt	430	21.6	
Liberal	E. Maloney	420	21.1	
Labour	H. Stichbury	393	19.8	
Labour	J. Clinkscales	388	19.5	
Turnout		~1,989	47.7	
Registered electors		4,170		
Conservative hold				
Conservative hold				
Conservative win (new seat)				

=== Rayleigh Central ===
Rayleigh Central (2 seats)
Party	Candidate	Votes	%	±%
Independent	S. Silva	535	41.8	
Conservative	R. Foster	530	41.4	
Conservative	P. Stanton*	493	38.5	
Independent	R. Hendry	433	33.8	
Labour	S. Andre	211	16.5	
Liberal	W. Bartlett	102	8.0	
Turnout		~1,280	49.3	
Registered electors		2,597		
Independent gain from Conservative				
Conservative hold				

=== Rochford Eastwood ===
Rochford Eastwood
Party	Candidate	Votes	%	±%
Conservative	G. Oldbury*	410	58.4	
Labour	E. Spearman	292	41.6	
Majority		118	16.8	
Turnout		702	54.2	
Registered electors		1,322		
Conservative hold		Swing		

=== Rochford Roche ===
Rochford Roche
Party	Candidate	Votes	%	±%
Conservative	N. Heard	352	51.0	
Labour	C. Stephenson*	338	49.0	
Majority		14	2.0	
Turnout		690	56.3	
Registered electors		1,236		
Conservative gain from Labour		Swing		

=== Rochford St Andrews ===
Rochford St Andrews (2 seats)
Party	Candidate	Votes	%	±%
Conservative	D. Mears	559	53.4	
Conservative	M. Garlick	539	51.5	
Labour	R. Blackburn*	445	42.5	
Labour	W. Tracey*	435	41.5	
Turnout		~1,047	42.2	
Registered electors		2,481		
Conservative gain from Labour				
Conservative gain from Labour				

=== Trinity ===
Trinity (2 seats)
Party	Candidate	Votes	%	±%
Conservative	D. Fowler*	704	53.2	
Liberal	R. Boyd	621	46.9	
Conservative	N. Grove*	597	45.1	
Liberal	M. Rapley	502	37.9	
Turnout		~1,323	51.1	
Registered electors		2,589		
Conservative hold				
Liberal gain from Conservative				

=== Wheatley ===
Wheatley (2 seats)
Party	Candidate	Votes	%	±%
Conservative	R. Holman	780	69.1	
Conservative	B. Lovett	751	66.5	
Liberal	H. Kilpatrick	336	29.8	
Turnout		~1,129	47.3	
Registered electors		2,387		
Conservative gain from Independent				
Conservative hold				

=== Whitehouse ===
Whitehouse (2 seats)
Party	Candidate	Votes	%	±%
Conservative	S. Fletcher*	682	66.7	
Conservative	L. Fudge*	652	63.7	
Liberal	M. Hunnable	281	27.5	
Liberal	D. Fraser	253	24.7	
Turnout		~1,023	38.9	
Registered electors		2,630		
Conservative hold				
Conservative hold				
