= 2023 Rochford District Council election =

2023 English local election

← 2022	4 May 2023	2024 →

13 out of 39 seats to Rochford District Council 20 seats needed for a majority

	First party	Second party	Third party
Leader	Simon Wootton		James Newport
Party	Conservative	Independent	Liberal Democrats
Last election	21 seats, 38.4%	2 seats, 5.1%	5 seats, 17.7%
Seats before	18	10	5
Seats won	5	1	4
Seats after	14	9	8
Seat change	▼3	▼1	▲3
Popular vote	6,393	1,621	5,002
Percentage	31.9%	8.1%	25.0%
Swing	▼6.5%	▲4.7%	▲7.3%
	Fourth party	Fifth party
Leader	Christine Mason
Party	Rochford Resident	Green
Last election	10 seats, 21.0%	1 seat, 4.8%
Seats before	5	1
Seats won	3	0
Seats after	7	1
Seat change	▲1	Steady
Popular vote	2,767	889
Percentage	13.8%	4.4%
Swing	▼7.2%	▼0.4%
Leader before election
Simon Wootton
Conservative
No overall control
Leader after election
John Mason
Rochford District Residents
No overall control

The 2023 Rochford District Council election took place on 4 May 2023 to elect members of Rochford District Council in Essex, England. This would be on the same day as other local elections in England.

Less than three months before the election, three Conservative councillors left the party, putting the council under no overall control with the Conservatives becoming a minority administration. Prior to that, the Conservatives had held a majority of the seats on the council since 2002.

The election saw the council remain under no overall control. A coalition of the Rochford District Residents, Liberal Democrats, Greens and independent councillors subsequently formed an administration, with John Mason of the Rochford District Residents being appointed leader of the council at the subsequent annual council meeting on 23 May 2023.

== Summary ==
=== Election result ===
2023 Rochford District Council election
Party	This election			Full council			This election		
Party	Seats	Net	Seats %	Other	Total	Total %	Votes	Votes %	+/−
Conservative	5	▼3	38.5	9	14	35.9	6,393	31.9	–6.5
Independent	1	▼1	7.7	8	9	23.1	1,621	8.1	+4.7
Liberal Democrats	4	▲3	30.8	4	8	20.5	5,002	25.0	+7.3
Rochford Resident	3	▲1	23.1	4	7	17.9	2,767	13.8	–7.2
Green	0	Steady	0.0	1	1	2.6	889	4.4	–0.4
Labour	0	Steady	0.0	0	0	0.0	2,891	14.4	–0.2
Britain First	0	Steady	0.0	0	0	0.0	214	1.1	N/A
Reform UK	0	Steady	0.0	0	0	0.0	187	0.9	N/A
ADF	0	Steady	0.0	0	0	0.0	47	0.2	N/A

== Ward results ==
The Statement of Persons Nominated, which details the candidates standing in each ward, was released by Rochford District Council following the close of nomination on 5 April 2023. The results for each ward were as follows:

=== Downhall & Rawreth ===
Downhall & Rawreth
Party	Candidate	Votes	%	±%
Liberal Democrats	James Newport*	1,050	68.0	+1.1
Conservative	Stuart Belton	296	19.2	–5.0
Labour	James Hedges	126	8.2	–0.7
Reform UK	Grant Randall	71	4.6	N/A
Majority		754	48.8	+6.1
Turnout		1,543	27.9	+0.2
Registered electors		5,530		
Liberal Democrats hold		Swing	▲3.0	

=== Foulness & The Wakerings ===
Foulness & The Wakerings
Party	Candidate	Votes	%	±%
Conservative	Daniel Efde*	731	55.4	–17.9
Labour	Philip Hannan	421	31.9	+5.2
Liberal Democrats	Deborah Taylor	168	12.7	N/A
Majority		310	23.5	–23.1
Turnout		1,320	23.2	–3.6
Registered electors		5,690		
Conservative hold		Swing	▼11.6	

=== Hawkwell East ===
Hawkwell East
Party	Candidate	Votes	%	±%
Rochford Resident	Elliot Mason	513	36.1	–5.5
Conservative	Mike Webb*	436	30.7	–7.8
Green	Rachel White	213	15.0	N/A
Labour	Victoria Williams	213	15.0	–4.8
ADF	Mark Vallance	47	3.3	N/A
Majority		77	5.4	+2.3
Turnout		1,422	30.3	+0.3
Registered electors		4,693		
Rochford Resident gain from Conservative		Swing	▲1.2	

=== Hawkwell West ===
Hawkwell West
Party	Candidate	Votes	%	±%
Rochford Resident	Nick Booth	870	54.3	+15.3
Conservative	Toni Carter*	432	27.0	–22.6
Labour	Keith Montgomery	166	10.4	–0.9
Green	Andrew White	134	8.4	N/A
Majority		438	27.3	N/A
Turnout		1,602	32.2	–1.5
Registered electors		4,975		
Rochford Resident hold		Swing	▲19.0	

=== Hockley ===
Hockley
Party	Candidate	Votes	%	±%
Rochford Resident	Adrian Eves*	929	60.0	+5.8
Conservative	James Hall	386	24.9	–7.8
Labour	Ian Rooke	233	15.1	+1.9
Majority		543	35.1	+13.6
Turnout		1,548	30.6	–1.0
Registered electors		5,059		
Rochford Resident hold		Swing	▲6.8	

=== Hockley & Ashingdon ===
Hockley & Ashingdon
Party	Candidate	Votes	%	±%
Conservative	Mike Carter*	472	28.9	–8.7
Rochford Resident	Phil Capon	455	27.9	+10.8
Britain First	Paul Harding	214	13.1	N/A
Labour	Hollie Ridley	190	11.6	+1.8
Liberal Democrats	Roger Gardner	173	10.7	–8.3
Green	Leanne Dalby	126	7.8	N/A
Majority		17	1.0	–17.8
Turnout		1,630	31.7	–0.6
Registered electors		5,142		
Conservative hold		Swing	▼9.8	

=== Hullbridge ===
Hullbridge
Party	Candidate	Votes	%	±%
Independent	Tracey Knight*	982	58.7	N/A
Conservative	Kelly Moody	469	28.0	–3.7
Labour	David Lench	223	13.3	–0.9
Majority		513	30.7	N/A
Turnout		1,674	29.4	–4.0
Registered electors		5,694		
Independent hold		Swing	N/A	

=== Lodge ===
Lodge
Party	Candidate	Votes	%	±%
Conservative	Ian Ward*	687	42.3	+2.0
Independent	Ian Wilson	639	39.3	N/A
Labour	Patricia Norrington	300	18.5	+6.2
Majority		48	3.0	N/A
Turnout		1,626	31.5	–1.6
Registered electors		5,162		
Conservative hold		Swing	N/A	

=== Roche North & Rural ===
Roche North & Rural
Party	Candidate	Votes	%	±%
Conservative	Simon Wootton*	409	31.3	–13.2
Labour	Myra Weir	358	27.4	+5.2
Liberal Democrats	Daniel Irlam	281	21.5	–11.6
Green	John-Barry Waldron	256	19.7	N/A
Majority		51	3.9	–7.6
Turnout		1,304	25.4	–2.3
Registered electors		5,134		
Conservative hold		Swing	▼9.2	

=== Roche South ===
Roche South
Party	Candidate	Votes	%	±%
Conservative	Arthur Williams*	490	40.9	–2.8
Labour	Shona Hyde-Williams	348	29.0	+4.7
Liberal Democrats	Derek Brown	200	16.7	N/A
Green	Samantha Spiteri	160	13.4	N/A
Majority		142	11.9	+0.2
Turnout		1,198	25.1	–1.2
Registered electors		4,773		
Conservative hold		Swing	▼3.8	

=== Sweyne Park & Grange ===
Sweyne Park & Grange
Party	Candidate	Votes	%	±%
Liberal Democrats	Elizabeth Brewer	1,039	72.9	N/A
Conservative	Scott Peters	387	27.1	–1.3
Majority		652	45.8	N/A
Turnout		1,426	29.2	+0.4
Registered electors		4,884		
Liberal Democrats gain from Conservative		Swing	N/A	

=== Trinity ===
Trinity
Party	Candidate	Votes	%	±%
Liberal Democrats	Sarah Page	1,149	58.1	–2.5
Conservative	Cheryl Roe*	698	35.3	+3.7
Labour	Billy Ridley	130	6.6	–1.1
Majority		451	22.8	–6.8
Turnout		1,977	36.3	–0.8
Registered electors		5,446		
Liberal Democrats gain from Conservative		Swing	▼3.4	

=== Wheatley ===
Wheatley
Party	Candidate	Votes	%	±%
Liberal Democrats	Richard Linden	942	54.1	+14.7
Conservative	Ian Beatwell	500	28.7	+0.2
Labour	Lorraine Ridley	183	10.5	+2.0
Reform UK	Adrian Short	116	6.7	N/A
Majority		442	25.4	+14.5
Turnout		1,741	34.6	–2.1
Registered electors		5,032		
Liberal Democrats gain from Independent		Swing	▲7.3	
