= Sutton, Essex =

Village in Essex, England

Coordinates: 51.570985°N 0.721510°E

Sutton
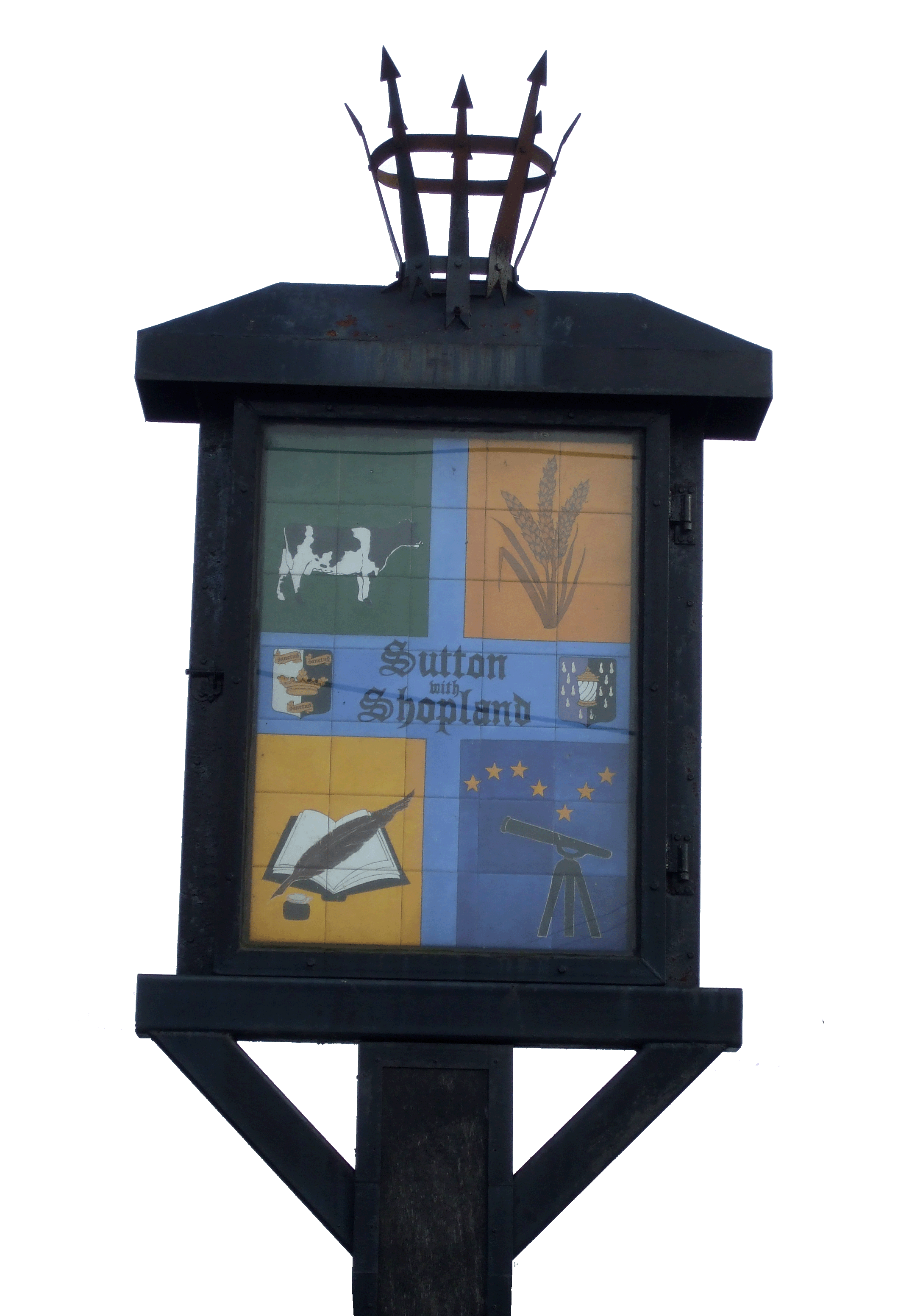
- Sutton with Shopland village sign

- Location within Essex
- Population: 129 (Parish, 2021)
- OS grid reference: TQ887893
- Civil parish: Sutton
- District: Rochford
- Shire county: Essex
- Region: East
- Country: England
- Sovereign state: United Kingdom
- Post town: Rochford
- Postcode district: SS4
- Dialling code: 01702
- Police: Essex
- Fire: Essex
- Ambulance: East of England

Sutton is a village and civil parish in the Rochford district in Essex, England. It is located between the River Roach and the adjoining Borough of Southend-on-Sea, and includes the hamlet of Shopland. At the 2021 census the parish had a population of 129.

It is least populous parish in Rochford district, although at the time of the Domesday Book it had a flourishing village with its own market and fair.

The place-name 'Sutton' is first recorded in the Domesday Book of 1086, where it appears as Suttuna. The name means 'southern town or settlement'.

The legal name of the parish is Sutton, but the parish council calls itself Sutton with Shopland Parish Council. Shopland was formerly a separate parish, which was abolished and its area absorbed into Sutton in 1933, except a small part which went instead to Southend-on-Sea. When St Mary Magdalene's church in Shopland was demolished in 1957 following bomb damage during the Second World War, artefacts were removed and taken to Sutton Church and others. Shopland churchyard is rededicated every year. Sutton Road (B1015) is approximately 3 miles (5 km) long and runs from the Anne Boleyn Public House on Southend Road in Rochford to Southchurch Road in Southend-on-Sea.

Sutton is rural with large farms, and is bordered by industrial estates on its northern (Purdeys Industrial Estate) and southern (Chandlers Way/Temple Farm Industrial Estate) borders.

== Church ==
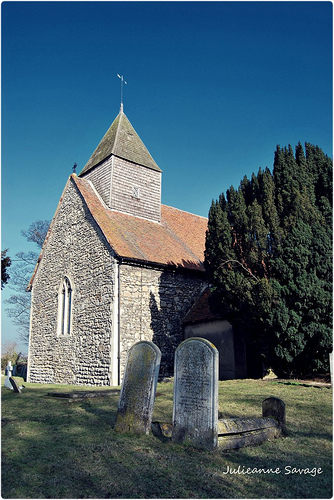
All Saints' Church, Sutton, now redundant

All Saints' Church is of Norman origin and is listed at Grade II* on the National Historic List for England (NHLE).

The chancel and nave date to the early 17th century. The bell turret dates to the 14th and 15th centuries. There are various c. 1869 and later repairs and restorations. The church is built of ragstone rubble, with Reigate stone and Barnack stone dressings. It has a red plain tiled roof and a cedar-shingled bell turret and spirelet. The church is unique among Essex churches inasmuch that its south door is of a rare rebated or interlocking type, with only five other churches in the county having similar doors. This door was faced to the south in 1869. Other examples can be found at the churches located in Castle Hedingham and Elmstead.

When the nearby Shopland church was demolished in 1957, a medieval coffin lid and brass, dated to 1371, of Sir Thomas Stapel, Sergeant at Arms to Edward III, was moved to All Saints' Church in 1971. The brass shows Stapel dressed in the armour he would have worn at the Battle of Crécy in 1346. All Saints' Church was declared redundant and permissible for secular use in 2015, and the brass and slab were moved again to St Andrew's Church in nearby Rochford, Essex in 2018, where they were set into the internal north wall of the tower.
