= 1998 Rochford District Council election =

1998 UK local government election

← 1996	7 May 1998	1999 →

14 out of 40 seats on the Rochford District Council 21 seats needed for a majority
	First party	Second party	Third party
Party	Labour	Conservative	Liberal Democrats
Last election	8	1	6
Seats before	11	2	23
Seats won	5	4	4
Seats after	12	6	18
Seat change	▲1	▲4	▼5
Popular vote	3,230	4,363	3,706
Percentage	26.9%	36.4%	30.9%
	Fourth party	Fifth party
Party	Residents	Independent
Last election	2	N/A
Seats before	3	1
Seats won	1	N/A
Seats after	3	1
Seat change	Steady	Steady
Popular vote	698	N/A
Percentage	5.8%	N/A

Elections to Rochford Council were held on 7 May 1998. One third of the council was up for election and the Liberal Democrat party lost overall control of the council to no overall control.

After the election, the composition of the council was:

- Liberal Democrat 18
- Labour 12
- Conservative 6
- Residents 3
- Independent 1

== Election results ==
1998 Rochford District Council election
Party	This election			Full council			This election		
Party	Seats	Net	Seats %	Other	Total	Total %	Votes	Votes %	+/−
Liberal Democrats	4	▼5	28.6	14	18	45.0	3,706	30.9	
Labour	5	▲1	35.7	7	12	30.0	3,230	26.9	
Conservative	4	▲4	28.6	2	6	15.0	4,363	36.4	
Residents	1	Steady	7.1	2	3	7.5	698	5.8	
Independent	0	Steady	0.0	1	1	2.5	0	0.0	

== Ward results ==
=== Downhall ===
Downhall
Party	Candidate	Votes	%	±%
Liberal Democrats	S. Lemon	510	61.2	
Conservative	P. Savill	189	22.7	
Labour	R. Lushey	135	16.2	
Majority			38.5	
Turnout			25.9	
Liberal Democrats hold		Swing		

=== Grange & Rawreth ===
Grange & Rawreth
Party	Candidate	Votes	%	±%
Conservative	R. Adams	467	36.3	
Labour	D. Rossi	420	32.7	
Liberal Democrats	V. Howlett	398	31.0	
Majority			3.7	
Turnout			26.6	
Conservative gain from Liberal Democrats		Swing		

=== Hawkwell East ===
Hawkwell East
Party	Candidate	Votes	%	±%
Liberal Democrats	H. Glynn	860	56.9	
Conservative	T. Cutmore	420	27.8	
Labour	D. Thompson	231	15.3	
Majority			29.1	
Turnout			26.7	
Liberal Democrats hold		Swing		

=== Hockley East ===
Hockley East
Party	Candidate	Votes	%	±%
Residents	R. Vingoe	698	77.7	
Conservative	M. Mead	132	14.7	
Labour	L. Bain	68	7.6	
Majority			63.0	
Turnout			29.0	
Residents hold		Swing		

=== Hullbridge Riverside ===
Hullbridge Riverside
Party	Candidate	Votes	%	±%
Labour	D. Flack	418	63.6	
Conservative	J. Spillane	239	36.4	
Majority			27.2	
Turnout			21.2	
Labour hold		Swing		

=== Hullbridge South ===
Hullbridge South
Party	Candidate	Votes	%	±%
Labour	M. Stephenson	314	66.1	
Conservative	S. Spillane	161	33.9	
Majority			32.2	
Turnout			20.8	
Labour hold		Swing		

=== Lodge ===
Lodge
Party	Candidate	Votes	%	±%
Liberal Democrats	D. Helson	466	43.0	
Conservative	J. Mockford	436	40.3	
Labour	S. Walton	181	16.7	
Majority			2.8	
Turnout			24.0	
Liberal Democrats hold		Swing		

=== Rayleigh Central ===
Rayleigh Central
Party	Candidate	Votes	%	±%
Liberal Democrats	J. Helson	324	44.2	
Conservative	G. Mockford	268	36.6	
Labour	A. Popplewell	141	19.2	
Majority			7.6	
Turnout			25.2	
Liberal Democrats hold		Swing		

=== Rochford Eastwood ===
Rochford Eastwood
Party	Candidate	Votes	%	±%
Labour	J. Ford	229	41.9	
Liberal Democrats	P. Stanton	175	32.0	
Conservative	V. Keenan	143	26.1	
Majority			9.9	
Turnout			40.1	
Labour gain from Liberal Democrats		Swing		

=== Rochford Roche ===
Rochford Roche
Party	Candidate	Votes	%	±%
Labour	D. Ford	370	66.3	
Conservative	M. Shelley	188	33.7	
Majority			32.6	
Turnout			29.6	
Labour hold		Swing		

=== Rochford St. Andrew's ===
Rochford St. Andrew's
Party	Candidate	Votes	%	±%
Labour	D. Weir	377	53.3	
Conservative	R. Amner	330	46.7	
Majority			6.6	
Turnout			31.3	
Labour hold		Swing		

=== Trinity ===
Trinity
Party	Candidate	Votes	%	±%
Conservative	K. Gibbs	372	47.0	
Liberal Democrats	P. Pearse	271	34.2	
Labour	J. Fielding	149	18.8	
Majority			12.8	
Turnout			27.5	
Conservative gain from Liberal Democrats		Swing		

=== Wheatley ===
Wheatley
Party	Candidate	Votes	%	±%
Conservative	M. Webster	478	52.6	
Liberal Democrats	R. Swain	344	37.8	
Labour	D. Randall	87	9.6	
Majority			14.7	
Turnout			39.2	
Conservative gain from Liberal Democrats		Swing		

=== Whitehouse ===
Whitehouse
Party	Candidate	Votes	%	±%
Conservative	P. Webster	540	53.6	
Liberal Democrats	M. Hunnable	358	35.5	
Labour	M. Emmons	110	10.9	
Majority			18.1	
Turnout			37.1	
Conservative gain from Liberal Democrats		Swing		
