= 1991 Rochford District Council election =

1991 UK local government election

Elections to Rochford Council were held on 2 May 1991. One third of the council was up for election.

== Results summary ==
1991 Rochford Borough Council election
Party	This election			Full council			This election		
Party	Seats	Net	Seats %	Other	Total	Total %	Votes	Votes %	+/−
Liberal Democrats	7	▲4	53.8	12	19	46.2	7,378	45.5	
Conservative	4	▼5	30.8	9	13	33.3	6,665	41.1	
Labour	2	▲1	15.4	5	7	17.9	2,074	12.8	
Ratepayer	0	Steady	0.0	1	1	2.6	0	0.0	
Independent	0	Steady	0.0	0	0	0.0	113	0.7	

== Ward results ==
=== Ashingdon ===
Ashingdon
Party	Candidate	Votes	%	±%
Liberal Democrats	B. Crick	642	49.5	
Conservative	T. Butcher	579	44.6	
Labour	D. Thompson	76	5.9	
Majority			4.9	
Turnout			54.7	
Liberal Democrats hold		Swing		

=== Barlington & Sutton ===
Barlington & Sutton
Party	Candidate	Votes	%	±%
Conservative	R. Allen	363	62.5	
Liberal Democrats	V. Stanton	133	22.9	
Labour	G. Plackett	85	14.6	
Majority			39.6	
Turnout			41.9	
Conservative hold		Swing		

=== Canewdon ===
Canewdon
Party	Candidate	Votes	%	±%
Liberal Democrats	T. Powell	495	55.1	
Conservative	D. Edwards	345	38.4	
Labour	C. Coyte	58	6.5	
Majority			16.7	
Turnout			52.0	
Liberal Democrats gain from Conservative		Swing		

=== Foulness & Great Wakering East ===
Foulness & Great Wakering East
Party	Candidate	Votes	%	±%
Conservative	R. Pearson	496	68.7	
Labour	B. Cottle	226	31.3	
Majority			37.4	
Turnout			43.0	
Conservative hold		Swing		

=== Grange & Rawreth ===
Grange & Rawreth
Party	Candidate	Votes	%	±%
Liberal Democrats	A. Stephens	1,041	55.8	
Conservative	P. Savill	557	29.8	
Labour	S. Andre	269	14.4	
Majority			26.0	
Turnout			43.3	
Liberal Democrats hold		Swing		

=== Great Wakering Central ===
Great Wakering Central
Party	Candidate	Votes	%	±%
Labour	G. Jones	464	63.8	
Conservative	B. Wilkins	263	36.2	
Majority			27.6	
Turnout			53.3	
Labour hold		Swing		

=== Great Wakering West ===
Great Wakering West
Party	Candidate	Votes	%	±%
Labour	G. Fox	242	50.4	
Conservative	B. Wright	238	49.6	
Majority			0.8	
Turnout			47.2	
Labour gain from Conservative		Swing		

=== Hawkwell East ===
Hawkwell East
Party	Candidate	Votes	%	±%
Conservative	K. Smith	887	46.0	
Liberal Democrats	V. Leach	812	42.1	
Labour	G. Tasker	228	11.8	
Majority			3.9	
Turnout			36.3	
Conservative hold		Swing		

=== Hawkwell West ===
Hawkwell West
Party	Candidate	Votes	%	±%
Conservative	J. Fawell	562	42.0	
Labour	M. Weir	426	31.9	
Liberal Democrats	K. Saunders	349	26.1	
Majority			10.1	
Turnout			43.1	
Conservative hold		Swing		

=== Lodge ===
Lodge
Party	Candidate	Votes	%	±%
Liberal Democrats	M. Brown	1,375	66.6	
Conservative	J. Farrell	689	33.4	
Majority			33.2	
Turnout			43.7	
Liberal Democrats gain from Conservative		Swing		

=== Trinity ===
Trinity
Party	Candidate	Votes	%	±%
Liberal Democrats	D. Helson	912	68.3	
Conservative	L. Argentieri	423	31.7	
Majority			36.6	
Turnout			44.6	
Liberal Democrats hold		Swing		

=== Wheatley ===
Wheatley
Party	Candidate	Votes	%	±%
Liberal Democrats	S. Tellis	793	52.1	
Conservative	P. Webster	730	47.9	
Majority			4.2	
Turnout			62.2	
Liberal Democrats gain from Conservative		Swing		

=== Whitehouse ===
Whitehouse
Party	Candidate	Votes	%	±%
Liberal Democrats	J. Giles	826	56.1	
Conservative	D. Hale	533	36.2	
Independent	S. Silva	113	7.7	
Majority			19.9	
Turnout			54.1	
Liberal Democrats gain from Conservative		Swing		
