= 2022 Rochford District Council election =

← 2021	4 May 2022	2023 →

13 out of 39 seats to Rochford District Council 20 seats needed for a majority

	First party	Second party	Third party
Party	Conservative	Rochford Resident	Liberal Democrats
Last election	27 seats, 42.9%	6 seats, 28.1%	3 seats, 11.3%
Seats won	5	4	3
Seats after	21	10	5
Seat change	▼6	▲4	▲2
Popular vote	8,028	4,399	3,702
Percentage	38.4%	21.0%	17.7%
Swing	▼4.5%	▼7.1%	▲6.4%
	Fourth party	Fifth party
Party	Independent	Green
Last election	2 seats, 6.1%	1 seat, 0.4%
Seats won	0	1
Seats after	2	1
Seat change	Steady	Steady
Popular vote	712	1,013
Percentage	3.4%	4.8%
Swing	▼2.7%	▲4.4%
- Winner of each seat at the 2022 Rochford District Council election
Council control before election
Conservative
Council control after election
Conservative

The 2022 Rochford District Council election took place on 5 May 2022 to elect members of Rochford District Council in England. This was on the same day as other local elections.

== Results summary ==
2022 Rochford District Council election
Party	This election			Full council			This election		
Party	Seats	Net	Seats %	Other	Total	Total %	Votes	Votes %	+/−
Conservative	5	▼6	38.5	16	21	53.8	8,028	38.4	-4.5
Rochford Resident	4	▲4	30.8	6	10	25.6	4,399	21.0	-7.1
Liberal Democrats	3	▲2	23.1	2	5	12.8	3,702	17.7	+6.4
Independent	0	Steady	0.0	2	2	5.1	712	3.4	-2.7
Green	1	Steady	7.7	0	1	2.6	1,013	4.8	+4.4
Labour	0	Steady	0.0	0	0	0.0	3,051	14.6	+3.5

== Ward results ==
=== Downhall & Rawreth ===
Downhall & Rawreth
Party	Candidate	Votes	%	±%
Liberal Democrats	Christopher Stanley	975	66.9	+5.0
Conservative	Keith Podd	352	24.2	−5.1
Labour Co-op	James Hedges	130	8.9	+0.2
Majority		623	42.7	
Turnout		1,457	27.7	
Liberal Democrats hold		Swing	▲5.1	

=== Foulness & The Wakerings ===
Foulness & The Wakerings
Party	Candidate	Votes	%	±%
Conservative	Jo McPherson	1,102	73.3	+5.8
Labour	Philip Hannan	401	26.7	+6.2
Majority		701	46.6	
Turnout		1,503	26.8	
Conservative hold		Swing	▼0.2	

=== Hawkwell East ===
Hawkwell East
Party	Candidate	Votes	%	±%
Rochford Resident	Deborah Squires-Coleman	596	41.6	−1.7
Conservative	Phil Shaw	552	38.5	−7.1
Labour	Hollie Ridley	284	19.8	+8.7
Majority		44	3.1	
Turnout		1,432	30.0	
Rochford Resident gain from Conservative		Swing	▲2.7	

=== Hawkwell West ===
Hawkwell West
Party	Candidate	Votes	%	±%
Conservative	Julie Gooding	837	49.6	+7.1
Rochford Resident	Andrea Styles	658	39.0	−10.9
Labour	Teddy Ryan	191	11.3	+3.8
Majority		179	10.6	
Turnout		1,686	33.7	
Conservative hold		Swing	▲9.0	

=== Hockley ===
Hockley
Party	Candidate	Votes	%	±%
Rochford Resident	John Mason	877	54.2	+9.8
Conservative	Reid Fairbairn	529	32.7	−13.1
Labour	Ian Rooke	213	13.2	+3.4
Majority		348	21.5	
Turnout		1,619	31.6	
Rochford Resident gain from Conservative		Swing	▲11.5	

=== Hockley & Ashingdon ===
Hockley & Ashingdon
Party	Candidate	Votes	%	±%
Conservative	Danielle Belton	629	37.7	−3.3
Liberal Democrats	Roger Gardner	315	18.9	+4.0
Rochford Resident	Elliot Mason	285	17.1	−16.3
Independent	Carole Weston	275	16.5	N/A
Labour	Jack Griffiths	166	9.9	−0.8
Majority		314	18.8	
Turnout		1,670	32.3	
Conservative hold		Swing	▼3.7	

=== Hullbridge ===
Hullbridge
Party	Candidate	Votes	%	±%
Green	Stuart Wilson	1,013	54.1	N/A
Conservative	Scott Peters	593	31.7	+6.4
Labour	Conner Agius	265	14.2	+4.2
Majority		420	22.4	
Turnout		1,871	33.4	
Green hold		Swing	N/A	

=== Lodge ===
Lodge
Party	Candidate	Votes	%	±%
Rochford Resident	Richard Lambourne	811	47.4	+4.1
Conservative	Simon Smith	690	40.3	−4.1
Labour	Loaine Ridley	211	12.3	±0.0
Majority		121	7.1	
Turnout		1,712	33.1	
Rochford Resident gain from Conservative		Swing	▲4.1	

=== Roche North & Rural ===
Roche North & Rural
Party	Candidate	Votes	%	±%
Conservative	Laureen Shaw	623	44.6	−0.9
Liberal Democrats	George Ioannou	463	33.1	+26.6
Labour	David Bodimeade	311	22.3	+6.1
Majority		160	11.5	
Turnout		1,397	27.7	
Conservative hold		Swing	▲13.8	

=== Roche South ===
Roche South
Party	Candidate	Votes	%	±%
Conservative	Mike Steptoe	551	43.7	−3.5
Rochford Resident	David Miles	403	32.0	+1.0
Labour	Vicky Williams	306	24.3	+8.0
Majority		148	11.7	
Turnout		1,260	26.3	
Conservative hold		Swing	▼2.3	

=== Sweyne Park & Grange ===
Sweyne Park & Grange
Party	Candidate	Votes	%	±%
Rochford Resident	Vilma Wilson	769	53.5	+6.9
Conservative	Jordan Jacobs	408	28.4	−13.7
Labour	Craig Archer	261	18.2	+6.9
Majority		361	25.1	
Turnout		1,438	28.8	
Rochford Resident gain from Conservative		Swing	▲10.3	

=== Trinity ===
Trinity
Party	Candidate	Votes	%	±%
Liberal Democrats	David Sharp	1,222	60.6	+16.6
Conservative	Robin Dray	637	31.6	−13.5
Labour	Steve Cooper	156	7.7	−3.3
Majority		585	29.0	
Turnout		2,015	37.1	
Liberal Democrats gain from Conservative		Swing	▲15.1	

=== Wheatley ===
Wheatley
Party	Candidate	Votes	%	±%
Liberal Democrats	Andrew Cross	727	39.4	+12.8
Conservative	Richard Linden	525	28.5	−3.7
Independent	Jamie Burton	437	23.7	−9.5
Labour	David Lench	156	8.5	+0.5
Majority		202	10.9	
Turnout		1,845	36.7	
Liberal Democrats gain from Conservative		Swing	▲8.3	
