= 2010 Rochford District Council election =

2010 UK local government election

← 2008	6 May 2010	2011 →
	First party	Second party	Third party
Party	Conservative	Liberal Democrats	Green
Last election	34	5	0
Seats before	34	5	0
Seats won	33	5	1
Seat change	▼1	Steady	▲1
Popular vote	17,732	5,128	2,053
Percentage	53.2%	15.4%	6.2%
Swing	▼7.8%	▲4.6%	▲2.9%
	Fourth party	Fifth party	Sixth party
Party	Rochford Resident	Independent	Labour
Last election	1	1	0
Seats before	1	1	0
Seats won	1	1	0
Seat change	Steady	Steady	Steady
Popular vote	937	659	3,172
Percentage	2.8	2.0%	9.5%
Swing	N/A	▲0.9%	▲1.8%
	Seventh party
Party	English Democrat
Last election	0
Seats before	0
Seats won	0
Seat change	Steady
Popular vote	2,722
Percentage	8.2%
Swing	▼2.5%
- Results of the 2010 Rochford District Council election

Elections to Rochford Council were held on 6 May 2010. One third of the council was up for election and the Conservative Party stayed in overall control of the council.

The Conservative Party won 13 seats up for election with a surprise result being the Green Party gaining their first seat from the Conservative Party and Rochford District Residents holding one seat.

== Results summary ==
Rochford local election result 2010
Party	Seats	Gains	Losses	Net gain/loss	Seats %	Votes %	Votes	+/−
Conservative	33	0	1	▼1	80.5	53.3	17,732	-7.8
Liberal Democrats	5	0	0	Steady	12.1	15.4	5,128	+4.6
Green	1	1	0	▲1	2.4	6.1	2,053	+2.9
Rochford Resident	1	0	0	Steady	2.4	2.8	937	N/A
Independent	1	0	0	Steady	2.4	1.7	569	+0.9
Labour	0	0	0	Steady	0.0	9.5	3,172	+1.8
English Democrat	0	0	0	Steady	0.0	8.2	2,722	-2.5
BNP	0	0	0	Steady	0.0	2.7	910	N/A

== Ward results ==
=== Downhall and Rawreth ===
Downhall and Raweth
Party	Candidate	Votes	%	±%
Liberal Democrats	Chris Black	1846	70.57	
Conservative	Nicholas Alan Orr	770	29.43	
Majority		1076	41.13	
Turnout			70.4	
Liberal Democrats hold		Swing		

=== Foulness and Great Wakering ===
Foulness and Great Wakering
Party	Candidate	Votes	%	±%
Conservative	Trevor Edward Goodwin	1607	53.73	
Independent	Brian Efde	659	22.03	
Labour	Tim Nicholls	625	20.90	
Majority		948	32.79	
Turnout			65.4	
Conservative hold		Swing		

=== Grange ===
Grange
Party	Candidate	Votes	%	±%
Liberal Democrats	Christopher John Lumley	1205	62.60	
Conservative	Aron Priest	720	37.40	
Majority		485	25.19	
Turnout			68.1	
Liberal Democrats hold		Swing		

=== Hawkwell North ===
Hawkwell North
Party	Candidate	Votes	%	±%
Conservative	Joanne Elizabeth McPherson	1291	54.06	
Liberal Democrats	Sam Duncombe	833	34.88	
BNP	Antony William Evennett	264	11.06	
Majority		458	19.18	
Turnout			68.6	
Conservative hold		Swing		

=== Hawkwell South ===
Hawkwell South
Party	Candidate	Votes	%	±%
Conservative	Heather Lilian Ann Glynn	1584	80.28	
BNP	Earl Victor Strobridge	389	19.72	
Majority		1195	60.57	
Turnout			62.2	
Conservative hold		Swing		

=== Hawkwell West ===
Hawkwell West
Party	Candidate	Votes	%	±%
Rochford Resident	John Mason	937	40.2	
Conservative	Ian Howard Ward	832	35.7	
Labour	Myra Anne Weir	306	13.1	
English Democrat	Gloria Harmsworth	157	6.7	
BNP	James Michael Antony Wells	101	4.3	
Majority		105	4.5	
Turnout			72	
Rochford Resident hold		Swing		

=== Hockley Central ===
Hockley Central
Party	Candidate	Votes	%	±%
Conservative	Carole Anne Weston	2646	73.79	
Labour	David Charles Thompson	940	26.21	
Majority		1706	47.57	
Turnout			69.9	
Conservative hold		Swing		

=== Hullbridge ===
Hullbridge
Party	Candidate	Votes	%	±%
Green	Michael Hoy	1,446	39.5	
Conservative	Brian Hazlewood	1,302	35.6	
Labour	Angelina Marriott	467	12.8	
English Democrat	Pauline Smith	445	12.2	
Majority		144	3.9	
Turnout			68.7	
Green gain from Conservative		Swing		

=== Rayleigh Central ===
Rayleigh Central
Party	Candidate	Votes	%	±%
Conservative	Patricia Aves	1242	54.67	
Liberal Democrats	Mike Nobes	702	30.90	
English Democrat	Thomas Broad	328	14.44	
Majority		540	23.77	
Turnout			68.1	
Conservative hold		Swing		

=== Rochford ===
Rochford
Party	Candidate	Votes	%	±%
Conservative	James Philip Cottis	1813	55.72	
Labour	Robert Matthew Brown	834	25.63	
Green	Douglas John Copping	607	18.65	
Majority		979	30.09	
Turnout			58.1	
Conservative hold		Swing		

=== Trinity ===
Trinity
Party	Candidate	Votes	%	±%
Conservative	James Edward Grey	1070	50.07	
Liberal Democrats	Chris Stanley	542	25.36	
English Democrat	Paula Hayter	525	24.57	
Majority		528	24.71	
Turnout			74	
Conservative hold		Swing		

=== Wheatley ===
Wheatley
Party	Candidate	Votes	%	±%
Conservative	Mavis Joan Webster	1470	68.82	
English Democrat	Nicola Gallaway	666	31.18	
Majority		804	37.64	
Turnout			69	
Conservative hold		Swing		

=== Whitehouse ===
Whitehouse
Party	Candidate	Votes	%	±%
Conservative	Peter Frederick Arthur Webster	1385	64.66	
English Democrat	Tim Hayter	601	28.06	
BNP	Joan Elizabeth Court	156	7.28	
Majority		784	36.60	
Turnout			68.2	
Conservative hold		Swing		
