= 2011 Rochford District Council election =

2011 UK local government election

← 2010	5 May 2011	2012 →
	First party	Second party	Third party
Party	Conservative	Liberal Democrats	Rochford Resident
Last election	34	5	1
Seats before	34	5	1
Seats won	33	4	2
Seat change	▼1	▼1	▲1
Popular vote	8,024	5,128	660
Percentage	50.5%	16.3%	4.2%
Swing	▼2.7%	▲0.9%	▲1.4%
	Fourth party	Fifth party	Sixth party
Party	Green	Labour	English Democrat
Last election	1	0	0
Seats before	1	0	0
Seats won	1	0	0
Seat change	Steady	Steady	Steady
Popular vote	782	2,113	1,271
Percentage	4.9%	13.3%	8.0%
Swing	▼1.3%	▲3.8%	▼0.2%
	Seventh party
Party	Independent
Last election	1
Seats before	1
Seats won	0
Seat change	▼1
Popular vote	187
Percentage	1.2%
Swing	▼0.8%
- Results of the 2011 Rochford District Council election

Elections to Rochford District Council were held on 5 May 2011 alongside other local elections across the United Kingdom. The Conservative Party remained the largest party.

Thirteen seats were up for election, comprising one third of the council. Three seats were uncontested, with only a Conservative Party candidate. Of the remaining ten, the Conservatives won seven, gaining one from the Liberal Democrats who won two, and losing one to Rochford District Residents.
