= 2012 Rochford District Council election =

2012 UK local government election

← 2011	3 May 2012	2014 →
	First party	Second party	Third party
Party	Conservative	Liberal Democrats	Green
Last election	33	4	1
Seats before	32	4	2
Seats won	32	4	2
Seat change	Steady	Steady	Steady
Popular vote	6,911	423	1,442
Percentage	54.5%	3.3%	11.4%
Swing	▲4.0%	▼13.0%	▲6.5%
	Fourth party	Fifth party	Sixth party
Party	Rochford Resident	Labour	English Democrat
Last election	2	0	0
Seats before	2	0	0
Seats won	2	0	0
Seat change	Steady	Steady	Steady
Popular vote	N/A	2,899	785
Percentage	N/A	22.9%	6.2%
Swing	N/A	▲9.6%	▼1.8%
- Results of the 2012 Rochford District Council election

The 2012 Rochford Council election took place on 3 May 2012 to elect members of the Rochford District Council in England. They were held on the same day as other United Kingdom elections.
