= 2026 Rochford District Council election =

2026 English local government election

- 7 May 2026

15 out of 39 seats to Rochford District Council (including 2 by-elections) 20 seats needed for a majority
- Registered: 69,074
- Turnout: 32,170; 46.6%
	First party	Second party	Third party
Leader	None	(Note: Michael Hoy was leader of the Non-Aligned group (6 seats), Richard Linden was leader of the Associated Independents group (4 seats), and Arthur Williams was leader of the Rochford, Foulness & Wakering Independents group (3 seats).)	Danielle Belton
Party	Reform	Independent	Conservative
Last election	Did not stand	9 seats, 19.1%	10 seats, 30.7%
Seats before	1	13	10
Seats won	13	1	0
Seats after	13	10	7
Seat change	▲13	▼3	▼3
Popular vote	14,741	1,648	8,625
Percentage	40.8%	4.6%	23.9%
Swing	N/A	▼14.5%	▼6.8%
	Fourth party	Fifth party
Leader	James Newport	Vilma Wilson (defeated)
Party	Liberal Democrats	Rochford Resident
Last election	11 seats, 18.1%	8 seats, 11.8%
Seats before	8 (Note: Including one vacant seat previously held by the party.)	8
Seats won	1	0
Seats after	5	4
Seat change	▼2	▼4
Popular vote	5,203	799
Percentage	14.4%	2.2%
Swing	▼3.7%	▼9.6%
- Winner of each seat at the 2026 Rochford District Council election.
Leader before election
Danielle Belton
Conservative
No overall control (Note: Conservative–Rochford District Residents–Independent coalition.)
Leader after election
Adi Malviya
Reform UK
No overall control (Note: Reform UK minority administration)

The 2026 Rochford District Council election was held on 7 May 2026 to elect members of Rochford District Council in Essex, England. This was held on the same day as other local elections.

Prior to the election, the council was under no overall control, being run by a coalition of the Conservatives, Rochford District Residents and some of the independent councillors, led by Conservative councillor Danielle Belton. Reform UK won thirteen of the fifteen seats being contested at this election, and Danielle Belton lost her seat. (Note: Belton was subsequently re-elected to the council in a by-election the following month.) The council remained under no overall control, but with Reform becoming the largest party on the council. They subsequently formed a minority administration, with Reform councillor Adi Malviya being appointed leader of the council at the annual council meeting on 19 May 2026.

Due to ongoing local government reorganisation, this will be the final election to Rochford District Council before it is abolished and replaced by a successor unitary authority. Elections to the successor authority are due to take place in 2027.

== Summary ==
=== Background ===
In 2024, the council remained under no overall control. The Liberal Democrats were the largest party.

=== Council composition ===
After 2024 election		Before 2026 election	
Party	Seats	Party	Seats
Conservative	10	Conservative	10
Liberal Democrats	11	Liberal Democrats	7
Rochford Resident	8	Rochford Resident	7
Green	1	Green	1
Independent	9	Independent	12
Vacant	N/A	Vacant	2

Changes 2024–2026:

- May 2025: Richard Linden (Liberal Democrats), Bob Milne (Liberal Democrats) and Sarah Page (Liberal Democrats) leave party to sit as independents
- March 2026: Jim Cripps (Liberal Democrats) and Elliot Mason (Rochford Residents) resign – seats left vacant until 2026 election

=== Election result ===
2026 Rochford District Council election
Party	This election				Full council			This election		
Party	Candidates	Seats	Net	Seats %	Other	Total	Total %	Votes	Votes %	+/−
Reform	{{{candidates}}}	13	▲13	86.7	0	13	31.7	14,741	40.8	N/A
Independent	{{{candidates}}}	1	▼3	6.7	9	10	24.4	1,648	4.6	–14.5
Conservative	{{{candidates}}}	0	▼3	0.0	7	7	17.1	8,625	23.9	–6.8
Liberal Democrats	{{{candidates}}}	1	▼3	6.7	4	5	14.6	5,203	14.4	–3.7
Rochford Resident	{{{candidates}}}	0	▼4	0.0	5	4	12.2	799	2.2	–9.6
Green	{{{candidates}}}	0	Steady	0.0	0	0	0.0	3,672	10.2	+6.1
Labour	{{{candidates}}}	0	Steady	0.0	0	0	0.0	1,406	3.9	–12.1
Heritage	{{{candidates}}}	0	Steady	0.0	0	0	0.0	37	0.1	–0.1

== Incumbents ==
Ward	Incumbent councillor	Party	Re-standing
Downhall & Rawreth	Chris Stanley	Liberal Democrats	Yes
Foulness & The Wakerings	Jo McPherson (Note: Originally elected as a Conservative, but subsequently left the party to sit as an independent.)	Independent	No
Hawkwell East	Deborah Squires-Coleman	Rochford Resident	Yes
Hawkwell West	Julie Gooding	Independent	No
Hockley	John Mason	Rochford Resident	No
Hockley & Ashingdon	Danielle Belton	Conservative	Yes
Hullbridge	Stuart Wilson (Note: Originally elected as a Green, but subsequently left the party to sit as an independent.)	Independent	No
Lodge	Richard Lambourne (Note: Originally elected as a Rochford District Resident, but subsequently left the party to sit as an independent.)	Independent	No
Roche North & Rural	Laureen Shaw	Conservative	Yes
Roche South	Mike Steptoe	Conservative	Yes
Sweyne Park & Grange	Vilma Wilson	Rochford Resident	Yes
Trinity	David Sharp	Liberal Democrats	No
Wheatley	Andrew Cross	Liberal Democrats	Yes

== Candidates ==
=== Downhall & Rawreth ===
Downhall & Rawreth (2 seats due to by-election)
Party	Candidate	Votes	%	±%
Reform	Rob Ince	976	42.7	N/A
Liberal Democrats	Chris Stanley*	746	32.6	–27.0
Reform	Christopher Thorne	729	31.9	N/A
Conservative	Stuart Belton	613	26.8	+1.1
Liberal Democrats	Reece Nelson	611	26.8	–32.8
Conservative	Ian Lucas	418	18.3	–7.4
Green	Liam Lonergan	193	8.4	N/A
Green	Rowland Swain	154	6.7	N/A
Labour	David Bodimeade	132	5.8	–8.9
Turnout		~2,287		
Reform gain from Liberal Democrats				
Liberal Democrats hold				

=== Foulness & The Wakerings ===
Foulness & The Wakerings
Party	Candidate	Votes	%	±%
Independent	Jo McPherson*	1,108	43.7	+6.2
Reform	James Cottis	892	35.2	N/A
Conservative	Rosalind Efde	315	12.4	–24.1
Green	Philip Hannan	170	6.7	N/A
Liberal Democrats	Stephen Tellis	49	1.9	–1.8
Majority		216	8.5	+7.5
Turnout		2,534		
Independent hold				

=== Hawkwell East ===
Hawkwell East (2 seats due to by-election)
Party	Candidate	Votes	%	±%
Reform	Katherine Reid	947	44.8	N/A
Reform	Robert Reid	890	42.1	N/A
Rochford Resident	Deborah Squires-Coleman*	450	21.3	–1.5
Conservative	Eileen Gadsdon	393	18.6	–6.0
Conservative	Jim Hall	369	17.5	–7.1
Green	AJ Silver	350	16.6	+6.6
Independent	Danise Crosbie	271	12.8	–13.0
Green	Sam Martyn	246	11.6	+1.6
Liberal Democrats	Roger Gardner	158	7.5	N/A
Labour	Eleanor Harrin	113	5.4	–8.4
Heritage	Bella-Elena Armstrong	37	2.9	–1.1
Turnout		~2,112		
Reform gain from Rochford Resident				
Reform gain from Rochford Resident				

=== Hawkwell West ===
Hawkwell West
Party	Candidate	Votes	%	±%
Reform	Stephen Mace	1,043	43.6	N/A
Conservative	Tony Warwick	607	25.4	–1.6
Liberal Democrats	Keith Buchanan	380	15.9	N/A
Green	Shona Flack	253	10.6	N/A
Labour	Teddy Ryan	110	4.6	–11.4
Majority		436	18.2	N/A
Turnout		2,393		
Reform gain from Independent				

=== Hockley ===
Hockley
Party	Candidate	Votes	%	±%
Reform	Gary Wheeler	901	37.5	N/A
Conservative	Toni Carter	638	26.6	–2.0
Independent	Sue Taylor	269	11.2	N/A
Liberal Democrats	Nicola O'Riordan-Finley	240	10.0	N/A
Green	Kaite De-Veuve	230	9.6	–9.0
Labour	Ian Rooke	125	5.2	–7.5
Majority		263	10.9	N/A
Turnout		2,403		
Reform gain from Rochford Resident				

=== Hockley & Ashingdon ===
Hockley & Ashingdon
Party	Candidate	Votes	%	±%
Reform	Carl Turner	952	34.8	N/A
Conservative	Danielle Belton*	926	33.9	–3.3
Liberal Democrats	Richard Pryor	626	22.9	N/A
Green	John Waldron	144	5.3	–3.5
Labour	Patricia Norrington	87	3.2	–16.1
Majority		26	0.9	N/A
Turnout		2,735		
Reform gain from Conservative				

=== Hullbridge ===
Hullbridge
Party	Candidate	Votes	%	±%
Reform	Tina Hughes	1,571	54.2	N/A
Green	Chris Taylor	652	22.5	N/A
Conservative	Chinu Kishore	533	18.4	–0.6
Labour	David Lench	140	4.8	–7.0
Majority		919	31.7	N/A
Turnout		2,896		
Reform gain from Independent				

=== Lodge ===
Lodge
Party	Candidate	Votes	%	±%
Reform	Angela Sutton	1,103	44.1	N/A
Conservative	Jack Lawmon	706	28.3	–14.4
Liberal Democrats	Ian Jordan	457	18.3	–39.0
Green	Andrew Argyle	233	9.3	N/A
Majority		397	15.8	N/A
Turnout		2,499		
Reform gain from Independent				

=== Roche North & Rural ===
Roche North & Rural
Party	Candidate	Votes	%	±%
Reform	Neil Hookway	1,065	48.6	N/A
Conservative	Laureen Shaw*	516	23.5	–7.0
Green	Mark Elmes	296	13.5	+5.2
Labour	James Hedges	197	9.0	–19.4
Liberal Democrats	Deborah Taylor	119	5.4	+0.1
Majority		549	25.1	N/A
Turnout		2,193		
Reform gain from Conservative				

=== Roche South ===
Roche South
Party	Candidate	Votes	%	±%
Reform	Tino Callaghan	813	40.3	N/A
Conservative	Mike Steptoe*	645	31.9	–8.6
Green	Richard Beasley	237	11.7	+2.4
Labour	Shona Hyde-Williams	232	11.5	–28.8
Liberal Democrats	Derek Brown	92	4.6	–5.3
Majority		168	8.4	N/A
Turnout		2,019		
Reform gain from Conservative				

=== Sweyne Park & Grange ===
Sweyne Park & Grange
Party	Candidate	Votes	%	±%
Reform	Stuart Prior	911	39.7	N/A
Conservative	Scott Peters	387	16.9	–8.4
Liberal Democrats	Dawn Balding	379	16.5	N/A
Rochford Resident	Vilma Wilson*	349	15.2	N/A
Green	Stephen Shrubsole	186	8.1	N/A
Labour	Lorraine Ridley	82	3.6	–12.0
Majority		524	22.8	N/A
Turnout		2,294		
Reform gain from Rochford Resident				

=== Trinity ===
Trinity
Party	Candidate	Votes	%	±%
Reform	Sanjoy Ghosh	1,013	36.3	N/A
Conservative	David Sperring	868	31.1	–5.9
Liberal Democrats	Sam Reed	605	21.7	–30.8
Green	Charles Joynson	175	6.3	N/A
Labour	Stephen Cooper	129	4.6	–5.8
Majority		145	5.2	N/A
Turnout		2,790		
Reform gain from Liberal Democrats				

=== Wheatley ===
Wheatley
Party	Candidate	Votes	%	±%
Reform	Adi Malviya	935	36.3	N/A
Liberal Democrats	Andy Cross*	741	28.7	–5.6
Conservative	Max Ellul	691	26.8	–0.4
Green	Roy Williams	153	5.9	N/A
Labour	Victoria Williams	59	2.3	–8.6
Majority		194	7.6	N/A
Turnout		2,579		
Reform gain from Liberal Democrats				

== By-elections ==
=== Sweyne Park & Grange ===
A by-election was held following the resignation of councillor Stuart Prior.

Sweyne Park & Grange by-election: 18 June 2026
Party	Candidate	Votes	%	±%
Conservative	Danielle Louise Belton	1,049	56.1	+39.2
Reform	Paul Stephen Thurgood	464	24.8	−14.9
Liberal Democrats	Dawn Balding	247	13.2	–3.3
Green	Liam Lonergan	78	4.2	−3.9
Labour	Lorraine Ridley	31	1.7	–1.9
Turnout		1,874	37.0	
Rejected ballots		5		
Registered electors		5,064		
Conservative gain from Reform				
