= 2000 Rochford District Council election =

2000 UK local government election

Elections to Rochford Council were held on 4 May 2000. One third of the council was up for election and the council stayed under no overall control.

After the election, the composition of the council was

- Conservative 19
- Liberal Democrat 9
- Labour 9
- Residents 2
- Independent 1

== Election result ==
Rochford local election result 2000
| Party | Seats | Gains | Losses | Net gain/loss | Seats % | Votes % | Votes | +/− |
|---|---|---|---|---|---|---|---|---|
| Conservative | 9 | | | +8 | 69.2 | | | |
| Liberal Democrats | 2 | | | -4 | 15.4 | | | |
| Labour | 1 | | | -3 | 7.7 | | | |
| Residents | 1 | | | -1 | 7.7 | | | |
