= 2024 Rochford District Council election =

2024 English local election

← 2023	2 May 2024	2026 →

13 out of 39 seats to Rochford District Council 20 seats needed for a majority

	First party	Second party	Third party
Leader	James Newport	Simon Wootton
Party	Liberal Democrats	Conservative	Independent
Last election	8 seats, 25.0%	14 seats, 31.9%	9 seats, 8.1%
Seats before	9	12	10
Seats won	4	3	4
Seats after	11	10	9
Seat change	▲2	▼2	▼1
Popular vote	3,459	5,858	3,635
Percentage	18.1%	30.7%	19.1%
Swing	▼6.9%	▼1.2%	▲11.0%
	Fourth party	Fifth party
Leader	John Mason
Party	Rochford Resident	Green
Last election	7 seats, 13.8%	1 seat, 4.4%
Seats before	7	1
Seats won	2	0
Seats after	8	1
Seat change	▲1	Steady
Popular vote	781	781
Percentage	11.8%	4.1%
Swing	▼2.0%	▼0.3%
- Winner of each seat at the 2024 Rochford District Council election
Council control before election
John Mason
Rochford Residents
No overall control
Council control after election
James Newport
Liberal Democrat
No overall control

The 2024 Rochford District Council election took place on 2 May 2024 to elect members of Rochford District Council in Essex, England. This was on the same day as other local elections.

== Summary ==
The council was under no overall control prior to the election. The Conservatives were the largest individual party, but the council was being run by a coalition of the Liberal Democrats, Rochford Residents, Green Party and independents, led by John Mason of the Rochford Residents.

Following the election, the council remained under no overall control, but the Liberal Democrats overtook the Conservatives to become the largest party. A new coalition of the Liberal Democrats, Green Party and independents formed after the election. The Liberal Democrat group leader, James Newport, was appointed leader of the council at the subsequent annual council meeting on 21 May 2024.

=== Election result ===
2024 Rochford District Council election
Party	This election			Full council			This election		
Party	Seats	Net	Seats %	Other	Total	Total %	Votes	Votes %	+/−
Liberal Democrats	4	▲2	30.8	7	11	28.2	3,459	18.1	–6.9
Conservative	3	▼2	23.1	7	10	25.6	5,858	30.7	–1.2
Independent	4	▼1	30.8	5	9	23.1	3,635	19.1	+11.0
Rochford Resident	2	▲1	15.4	6	8	20.5	2,258	11.8	–2.0
Green	0	Steady	0.0	1	1	2.6	781	4.1	–0.3
Labour	0	Steady	0.0	0	0	0.0	3,049	16.0	+1.6
Heritage	0	Steady	0.0	0	0	0.0	38	0.2	N/A

== Ward results ==
The Statement of Persons Nominated, which details the candidates standing in each ward, was released by Rochford District Council following the close of nominations on 4 April 2024.

=== Downhall & Rawreth ===
Downhall & Rawreth
Party	Candidate	Votes	%	±%
Liberal Democrats	Jim Cripps*	891	59.6	–8.4
Conservative	Marie Langley	385	25.7	+6.5
Labour	James Hedges	220	14.7	+6.5
Majority		506	33.9	–14.9
Turnout		1,496	26.3	–1.6
Liberal Democrats hold		Swing	▼7.5	

=== Foulness & The Wakerings ===
Foulness & The Wakerings
Party	Candidate	Votes	%	±%
Independent	Gary Myers*	547	37.5	N/A
Conservative	Rosalind Efde	533	36.5	–18.9
Labour	Lorraine Ridley	325	22.3	–9.6
Liberal Democrats	Steve Tellis	54	3.7	–9.0
Majority		14	1.0	N/A
Turnout		1,459	25.1	+1.9
Independent hold				

=== Hawkwell East ===
Hawkwell East
Party	Candidate	Votes	%	±%
Independent	Mike Webb	337	25.8	N/A
Conservative	Toni Carter	322	24.6	–6.1
Rochford Resident	Joe Capon	298	22.8	–13.3
Labour	Keith Montgomery	181	13.8	–1.2
Green	Rachel White	131	10.0	–5.0
Heritage	Bella-Elena Armstrong	38	2.9	N/A
Majority		15	1.2	N/A
Turnout		1,307	27.7	–2.6
Independent gain from Conservative				

=== Hawkwell West ===
Hawkwell West
Party	Candidate	Votes	%	±%
Rochford Resident	Ian Wilson	848	57.0	+2.7
Conservative	David Osborne	401	27.0	±0.0
Labour	Teddy Ryan	238	16.0	+5.6
Majority		447	30.0	+2.7
Turnout		1,487	29.9	–2.3
Rochford Resident hold		Swing	▲1.4	

=== Hockley ===
Hockley
Party	Candidate	Votes	%	±%
Rochford Resident	Phil Capon	680	40.1	–19.9
Conservative	Eileen Gadsdon*	484	28.6	+3.7
Green	Chris Taylor	315	18.6	N/A
Labour	Ian Rooke	216	12.7	–2.4
Majority		196	11.5	–23.6
Turnout		1,695	33.5	+2.9
Rochford Resident gain from Conservative		Swing	▼11.8	

=== Hockley & Ashingdon ===
Hockley & Ashingdon
Party	Candidate	Votes	%	±%
Conservative	Roger Constable*	463	37.2	+8.3
Rochford Resident	Tracy Capon	432	34.7	+6.8
Labour	Hollie Ridley	240	19.3	+7.7
Green	John Waldron	110	8.8	+1.0
Majority		31	2.5	+1.5
Turnout		1,245	24.3	–7.4
Conservative hold		Swing	▲0.8	

=== Hullbridge ===
Hullbridge
Party	Candidate	Votes	%	±%
Independent	Michael Hoy*	1,091	69.2	+10.5
Conservative	Kelly Moody	299	19.0	–9.0
Labour	David Lench	186	11.8	–1.5
Majority		792	50.2	+19.5
Turnout		1,576	27.5	–1.9
Independent hold		Swing	▲9.8	

=== Lodge ===
Lodge
Party	Candidate	Votes	%	±%
Liberal Democrats	Robert Milne*	857	57.3	N/A
Conservative	Robin Dray	639	42.7	+0.4
Majority		218	14.6	N/A
Turnout		1,496	29.4	–2.1
Liberal Democrats hold				

=== Roche North & Rural ===
Roche North & Rural
Party	Candidate	Votes	%	±%
Conservative	Phil Shaw	424	30.5	–0.6
Labour	Conner Agius	395	28.4	+1.0
Independent	Denise Crosbie	383	27.5	N/A
Green	John Gallivan	116	8.3	–11.4
Liberal Democrats	Jennifer Johnson	74	5.3	N/A
Majority		29	2.1	–1.8
Turnout		1,392	27.6	+2.2
Conservative hold		Swing	▼0.8	

=== Roche South ===
Roche South
Party	Candidate	Votes	%	±%
Conservative	Angelina Marriott	473	40.5	–0.4
Labour	Shona Hyde-Williams	471	40.3	+11.3
Liberal Democrats	Debbie Taylor	116	9.9	–6.8
Green	Samantha Spiteri	109	9.3	–4.1
Majority		2	0.2	–11.7
Turnout		1,169	24.6	–0.5
Conservative hold		Swing	▼5.9	

=== Sweyne Park & Grange ===
Sweyne Park & Grange
Party	Candidate	Votes	%	±%
Independent	Lisa Newport*	820	59.1	N/A
Conservative	Scott Peters	351	25.3	–1.8
Labour	Victoria Williams	217	15.6	N/A
Majority		469	33.8	N/A
Turnout		1,388	28.0	–1.2
Independent hold				

=== Trinity ===
Trinity
Party	Candidate	Votes	%	±%
Liberal Democrats	Matt O'Leary	900	52.5	–5.6
Conservative	Simon Smith	634	37.0	+1.7
Labour	Steve Cooper	179	10.4	+3.8
Majority		266	15.5	–7.3
Turnout		1,713	31.8	–4.5
Liberal Democrats gain from Conservative		Swing	▼3.7	

=== Wheatley ===
Wheatley
Party	Candidate	Votes	%	±%
Liberal Democrats	Mike Sutton	567	34.3	–19.8
Independent	Jamie Burton	457	27.6	N/A
Conservative	Chinu Kishore	450	27.2	–1.5
Labour	Billy Ridley	181	10.9	+0.4
Majority		110	6.7	–18.7
Turnout		1,655	32.9	–1.7
Liberal Democrats gain from Independent				
