= Hullbridge =

Village in Essex, England

Coordinates: 51.620°N 0.620°E

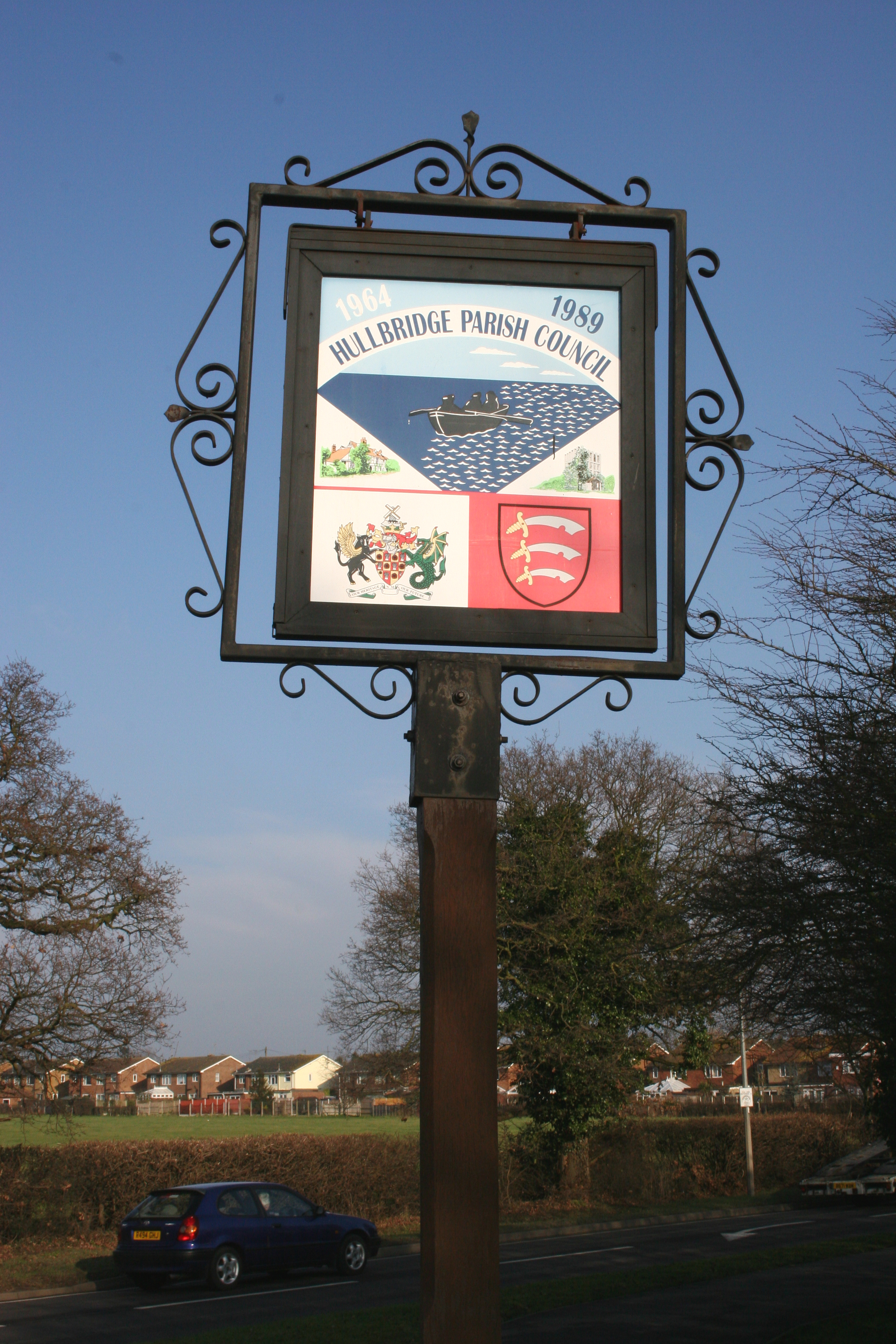
- Hullbridge Sign

- Location within Essex
- Population: 6,593 (Parish, 2021); 5,710 (Built up area, 2021)
- OS grid reference: TQ8194
- District: Rochford
- Shire county: Essex
- Region: East
- Country: England
- Sovereign state: United Kingdom
- Post town: Hockley
- Postcode district: SS5
- Dialling code: 01702
- Police: Essex
- Fire: Essex
- Ambulance: East of England

Hullbridge is a village and civil parish in the Rochford district of Essex, England. It lies 2 miles (3 km) north-west of Hockley, its post town. The northern boundary of the parish is the River Crouch. At the 2021 census the parish had a population of 6,593 and the built up area had a population of 5,710.

Prehistoric relics, such as Mesolithic flint axes, have been found in the parish. In the History of Rochford Hundred by Phillip Benton 1857 page 287 Hullbridge is listed as being Whoulnebregg 1375 Ct, Wolvebrigg 1377 Cl, Whulbridge 1492, t Eliza EAS (NS) iii, (OS)i, -bredg 1559 Ct, Hul(l)brigge 1480 Will, -bridge 1540 Ct, 1545 LP, Hulbredge 1544 FF, Hollbridge 1492 EAS (NS) iii, -brigge 1494 ib. "The bridge over the Huolne or Wholve, an old name of the Crouch supra 6. Folklore has it that a Roman Bridge existed here but there is no documented evidence to support a Roman bridge. Essex Record Office however has records relating to a bridge, and to its upkeep and indeed an accident on or from the bridge. Maps of Essex from 16th Century onwards until the mid 18th Century do show the bridge. Benton's book discusses a document that discloses the existence in the reign of Elizabeth I of a bridge here.

The OED defines "wholve" as a "short arched or covered drain under a path." The word appears to be local to this part of Essex. This definition may cast doubt on it being the old name for the Crouch but may suggest this is the form of the bridge.

Along the river bank there are remains of evaporation pans where salt was made in Bronze Age times. As captured by well renowned Countryside historian Oliver Rackham in his publication "History of Countryside" The field structures in and around Hullbridge and South Woodham Ferrers were formed during the Iron Age so an ancient settlement in or around Hullbridge is highly likely especially given the Saxon Burial ground finds in Rawreth when the Park school was being built.

Before the coming of the railways to Rayleigh, Hullbridge's wharf's were important for the distribution of various commodities especially, coal and shale. It was from here that Rayleigh received such goods. One of the wharfs was later to be used for a Brickworks.

The current village of Hullbridge was around until 1929 two communities in the parish of Hockley. One named Hullbridge, the other High Elms. In 1929 the owners of High Elms farm sold most of the land for development, so like its neighbour across the river South Woodham Ferrers it became a plotland ripe for holiday homes. So began the growth of the village. Hullbridge was made a separate civil parish from Hockley in 1964.

The village includes Riverside Primary School (opened September 2010, following the amalgamation of the infant and junior schools), a post office, a library and two pubs, The Anchor and The Smugglers Den (members only). Both overlook the river and have external drinking facilities. It also has three shopping facilities, One Stop, and two iterations of The Co-operative Food (one being operated by Chelmsford Star Co-operative Society), a Chinese and fish and chip takeaway service, a barber shop, a GP surgery, pharmacy and an Indian restaurant.

A frequent bus service to Southend via Rayleigh, gives a rail link with London and Southend.

== Sport and leisure ==
Hullbridge has a Non-League football club Hullbridge Sports F.C. who play at Lower Road.

Leisure facilities include yacht clubs, a sports and social club, and the Hullbridge Community Centre. The Rayleigh Club Golf and Country Club is situated on the main road out of Hullbridge towards Rayleigh. In addition, there are a number of riverside and country walks that start, finish or pass through Hullbridge.
