= Rochford District =

Coordinates: 51.5817°N 0.7082°E

- Non-metropolitan district
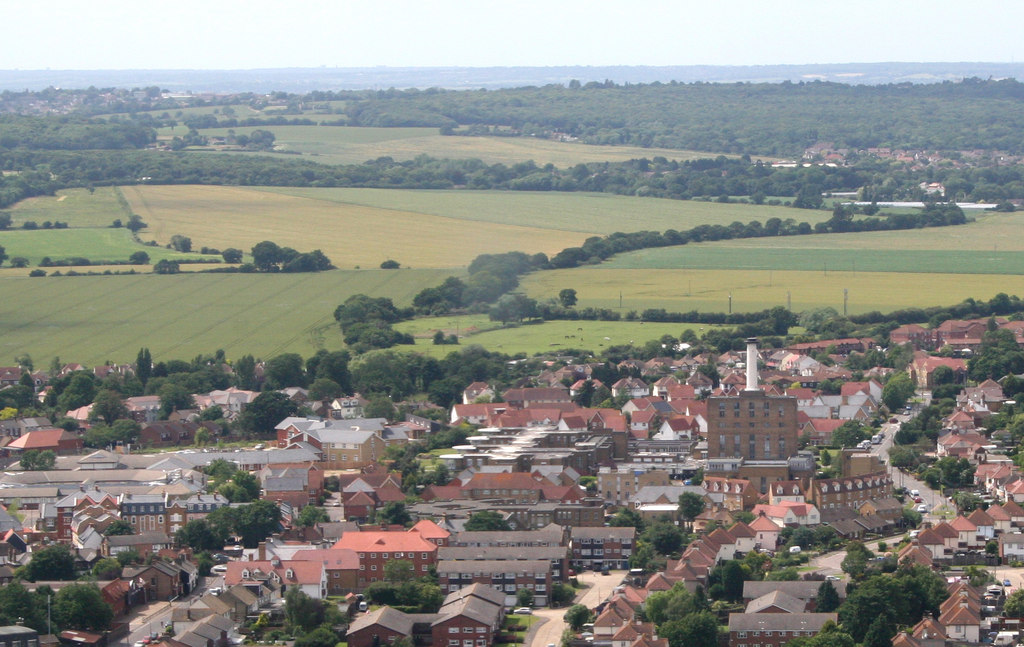
- Rochford, the administrative centre and one of the towns of the district

- Rochford shown within Essex
- Sovereign state: United Kingdom
- Constituent country: England
- Region: East of England
- Non-metropolitan county: Essex
- Status: Non-metropolitan district
- Admin HQ: Rochford
- Incorporated: 1 April 1974

Government
  - Type: Non-metropolitan district council
  - Body: Rochford District Council
  - Leadership: Alternative - Sec. 31 (No overall control)
  - MPs: Bayo Alaba; Mark Francois

Area
  - Total: 65.44 sq mi (169.49 km^{2})
  - Rank: 156th (of 296)

Population (2025)
  - Total: 90,760
  - Rank: 268th (of 296)
  - Density: 1,387/sq mi (535.5/km^{2})

Ethnicity (2021)
  - Ethnic groups: List: 95.9% White; 1.7% Mixed; 1.4% Asian; 0.7% Black; 0.3% other

Religion (2021)
  - Religion: List: 47.6% Christianity; 44.9% no religion; 7% other; 0.5% Islam
- Time zone: UTC0 (GMT)
  - Summer (DST): UTC+1 (BST)
- ONS code: 22UL (ONS); E07000075 (GSS)
- OS grid reference: TQ876904

Rochford is a local government district in Essex, England. It is named after one of its main settlements, Rochford, where the council is based. The largest town in the district is Rayleigh. Other places in the district include Hockley, Ashingdon, Great Wakering, Canewdon and Hullbridge.

The district borders Maldon District to the north, the City of Chelmsford to the north-west, the Borough of Basildon to the west, the Borough of Castle Point to the south-west, and the City of Southend-on-Sea to the south. To the east, it has a stretch of coast at Foulness Island.

Most of the built-up areas are in the western part of the district, along the railway line from Shenfield to Southend Victoria. Southend Airport straddles the district's border with the City of Southend-on-Sea. The eastern part of the district is more sparsely populated.

The district was planned to be merged with Southend-on-Sea City Council and Castle Point by the government as part of local government reform in 2028. However, in September 2026, the government withdrew the plans, and elections for the current council would take place in May 2027.

== History ==
The district was formed on 1 April 1974 under the Local Government Act 1972, covering the whole area of two former districts, which were abolished at the same time:

- Rayleigh Urban District
- Rochford Rural District

In March 2026, the government announced that it would abolish the district in 2028 as part of local government reform across Essex. These proposals were withdrawn in September 2026.

== Governance ==
Rochford District Council

Type
- Type: Non-metropolitan district

Leadership
- Chair: Simon Wootton, Conservative since 19 May 2026
- Leader: Adi Malviya, Reform UK since 19 May 2026
- Chief Executive: Jonathan Stephenson since 1 August 2021

Structure
- Seats: 39 councillors
- Political groups: Administration (12) Reform (12) Other parties (27) Conservative (8) Liberal Democrats (5) Rochford Resident (4) Independent (10)

Elections
- Last election: 7 May 2026

Meeting place
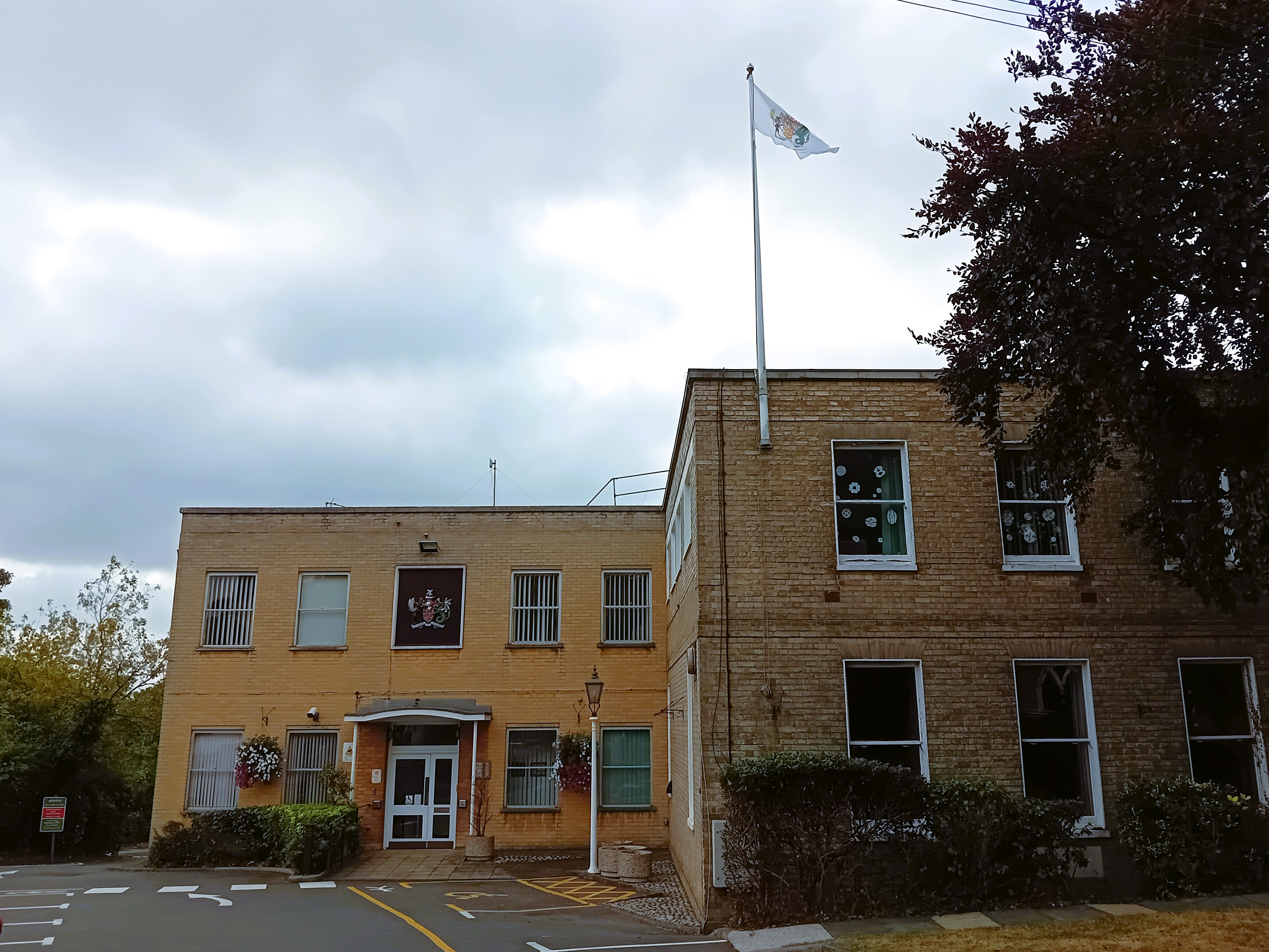
- Civic Suite, 2 Hockley Road, Rayleigh, SS6 8EB

Website
- www.rochford.gov.uk

Rochford District Council provides district-level services. County-level services are provided by Essex County Council. The district is also entirely covered by civil parishes, which form a third tier of local government.

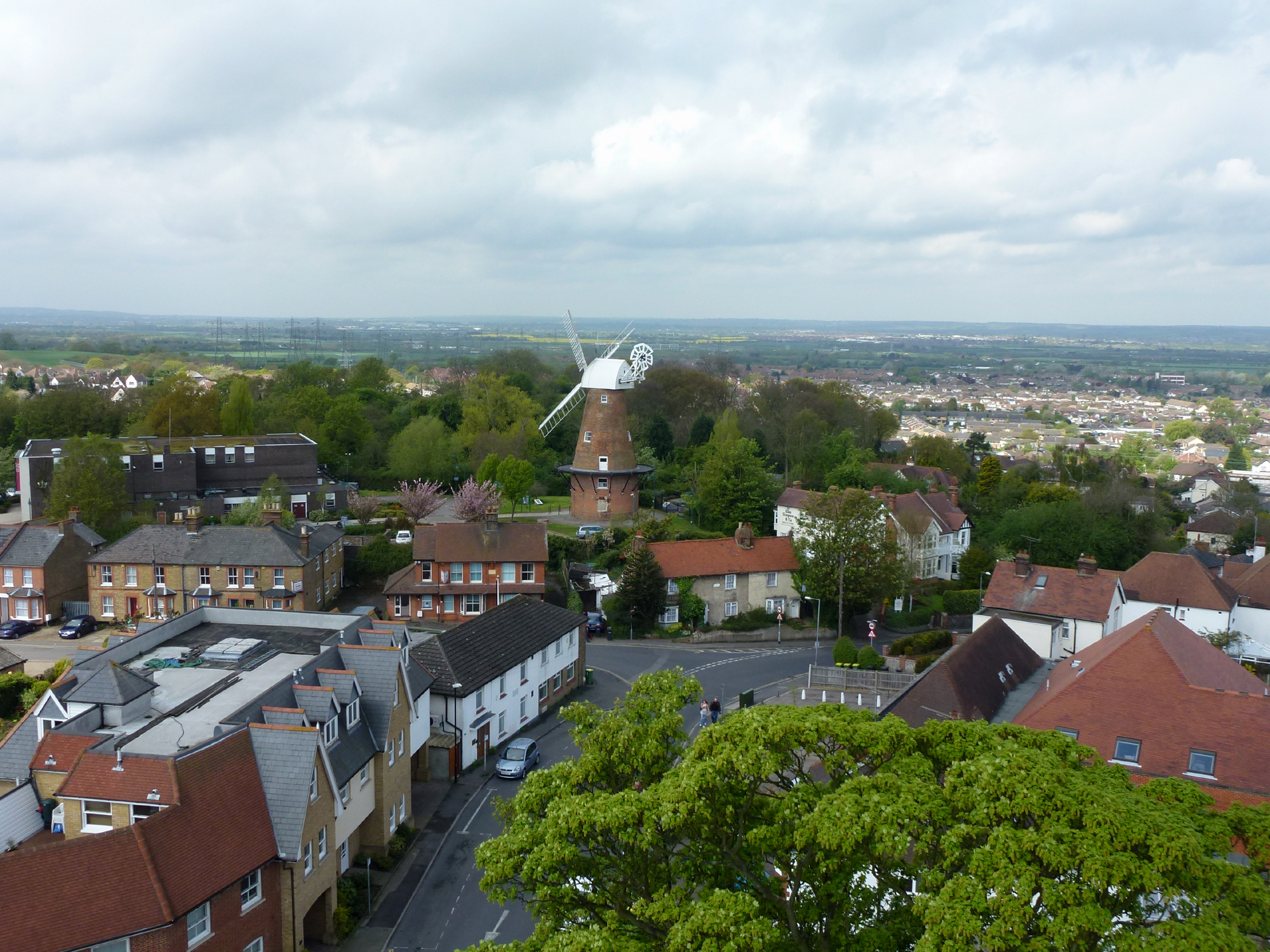
Rayleigh, one of the towns of the district and its largest settlement

=== Political control ===
The council has been under no overall control since 2023. Following the 2026 election, Reform UK became the largest party on the council and formed a minority administration to run the council.

The first election to the council was held in 1973, initially operating as a shadow authority alongside the outgoing authorities until the new arrangements came into effect on 1 April 1974. Political control of the council since 1974 has been as follows:

Party in control	Years
No overall control	1974–1976
Conservative	1976–1990
No overall control	1990–1994
Liberal Democrats	1994–1998
No overall control	1998–2002
Conservative	2002–2023
No overall control	2023–present

=== Leadership ===
The leaders of the council since 2004 have been:

Councillor	Party	From	To
Terry Cutmore	Conservative	2004	May 2019
Mike Steptoe	Conservative	May 2019	9 Jul 2020
Simon Wootton	Conservative	9 Jul 2020	May 2023
John Mason	Rochford District Residents	23 May 2023	May 2024
James Newport	Liberal Democrats	21 May 2024	May 2025
Danielle Belton	Conservative	20 May 2025	May 2026
Adi Malviya	Reform	19 May 2026	

=== Composition ===
Following the 2026 election and a subsequent by-election in June 2026, the composition of the council was:

Party	Councillors
Reform	12
Independent	10
Conservative	8
Liberal Democrats	5
Rochford Resident	4
Total	39

The next election is nominally scheduled for May 2027.

=== Elections ===
Since the last boundary changes in 2016 the council has comprised 39 councillors representing 13 wards, with each ward electing three councillors. Elections are held three years out of every four for a third of the council at a time. Elections to Essex County Council are held in the fourth year of the cycle when there are no district council elections.

=== Premises ===
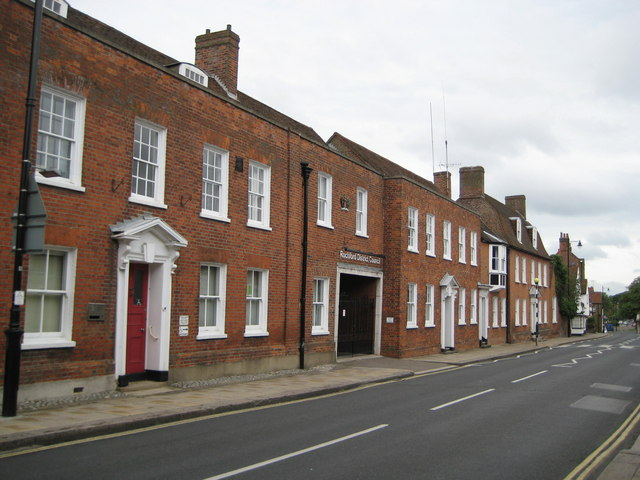
Council's headquarters: Council Offices, South Street, Rochford, SS4 1BW

The council has its main offices on South Street in Rochford. When the council was created it inherited the former Rochford Rural District Council's offices at Roche House, 7 South Street, Rochford and the former Rayleigh Urban District Council's offices at Barringtons, 2 Hockley Road, Rayleigh. Both buildings were converted houses. The council acquired other properties along South Street in Rochford and combined them with Roche House to form the council's headquarters.

The civic suite wing of Barringtons in Rayleigh, including the council chamber, was retained by the council and serves as the council's main meeting place. It closed in 2020 but reopened in 2024 after a period of uncertainty about its future.

== Parishes ==
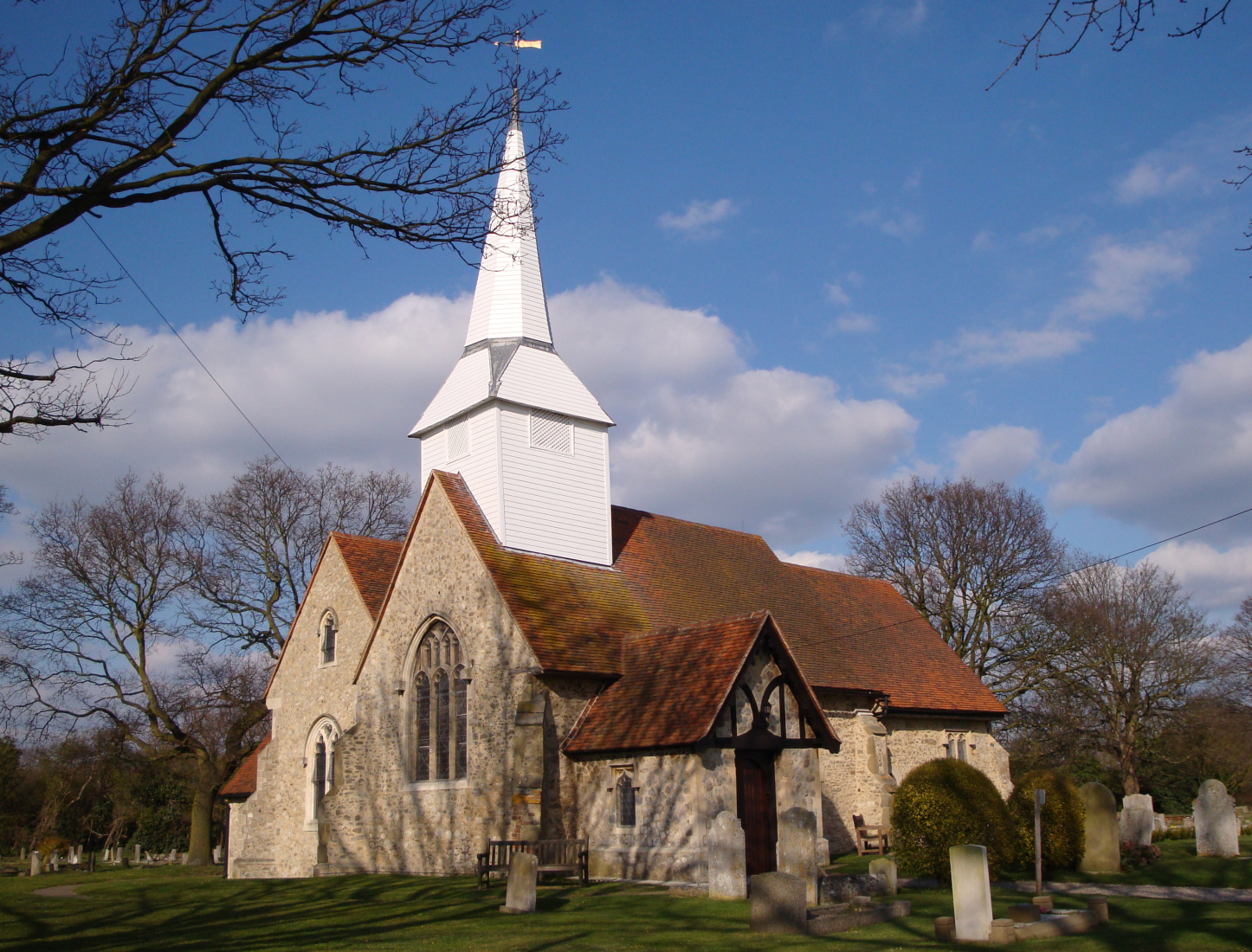
Hawkwell, one of the villages of the district

The district is divided into 14 civil parishes. The parish council for Rayleigh takes the style "town council".

- Ashingdon
- Barling Magna
- Canewdon
- Foulness
- Great Wakering
- Hawkwell
- Hockley
- Hullbridge
- Paglesham
- Rawreth
- Rayleigh (town)
- Rochford
- Stambridge
- Sutton

== Arms ==
Coat of arms of Rochford District

Notes
Granted 8 March 1975.
Crest
Issuant from an ancient crown Or a mount Vert thereon in front of a representation of Rayleigh windmill Proper a seaxe fesswise Proper.
Escutcheon
Chequy of twelve Or a rose Gules barbed and seeded proper charged with a like rose Argent barbed and seeded Proper and Gules a garb Or.
Supporters
On the dexter side a bull [guardant] Sable armed unguled and winged Or and sinister a wyvern Vert.
Motto
Our Heritage Our Future.
Badge
A roundel barry dancetty of six Gules and Or a pale wavy Argent charged with two pallets wavy Azure.
