= Ramsden Crays =

Civil parish in Essex, England

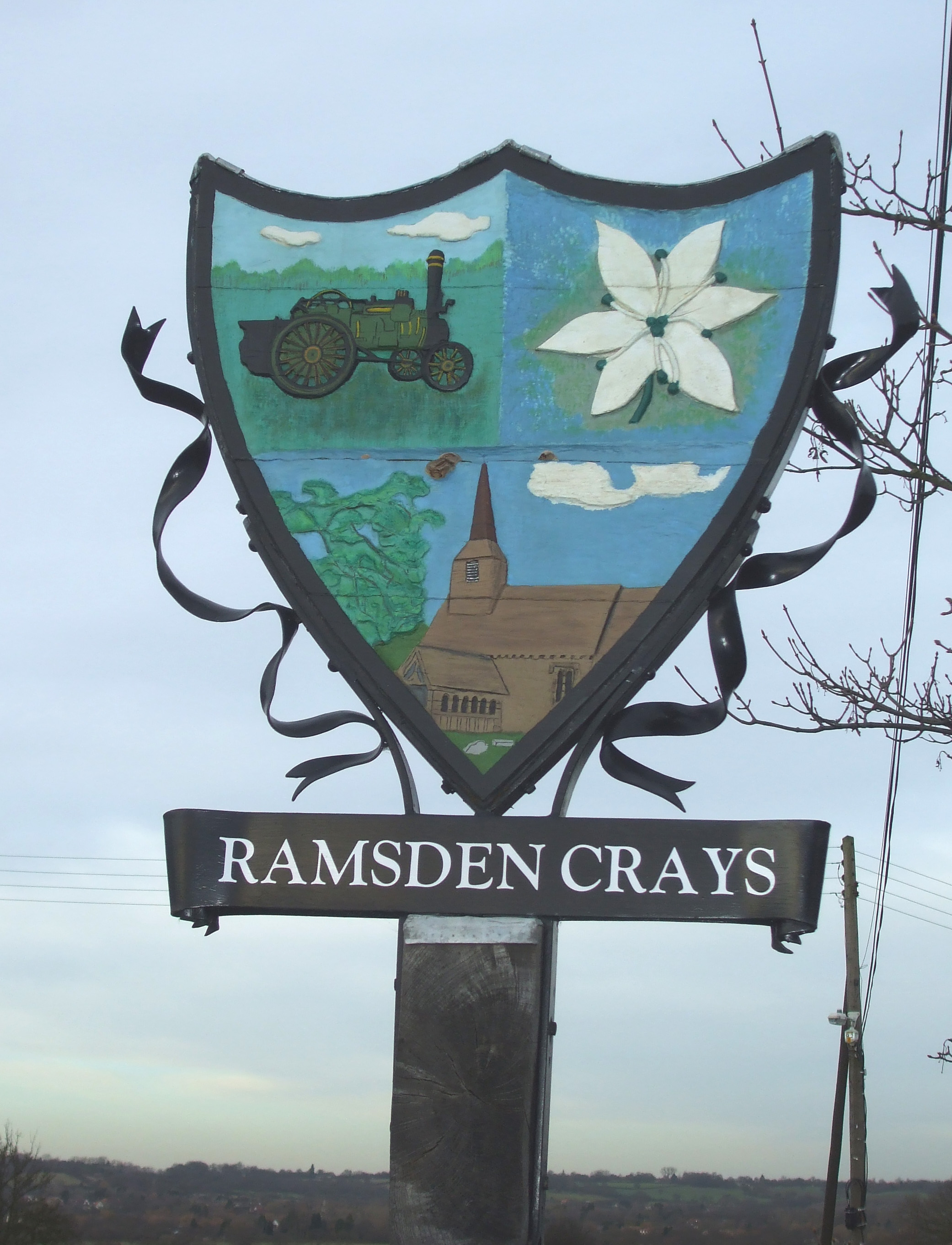
- Ramsden Crays village sign

- Location within Essex
- Interactive map of Ramsden Crays
- Population: 1,218 (Parish, 2021)
- OS grid reference: TQ 71769 92312
- Civil parish: Ramsden Crays
- Shire county: Essex
- Region: East
- Country: England
- Sovereign state: United Kingdom
- Post town: Chelmsford
- Postcode district: CM11
- Dialling code: 01268
- Police: Essex
- Fire: Essex
- Ambulance: East of England
- UK Parliament: Basildon and Billericay

Ramsden Crays is a civil parish in the Basildon district of Essex, England. It lies north of Basildon and west of Wickford. The parish includes the village of Crays Hill and is located north of the A127. The River Crouch runs through the parish. At the 2021 census the parish had a population of 1,218.

== History ==
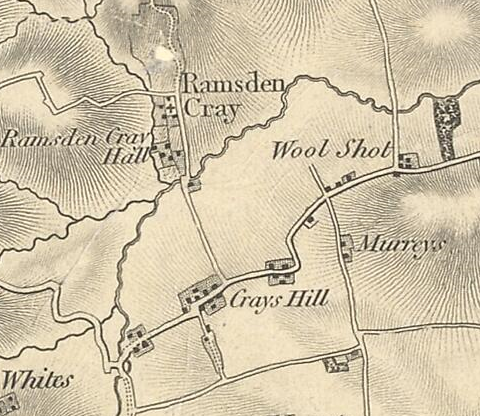
Ramsden Crays 1805

The place-name 'Ramsden' is first attested in the Domesday Book of 1086, where it appears as Ramesdana. The name means 'wild garlic dene or valley' (cf. the plant ramsons), or possibly 'ram's valley'. Close Rolls show that Ramsden Crays was held by Simon de Craye in 1252, Craye referring to Cray or Craye in France.

In the early 1870s, John Marius Wilson describes:

"RAMSDEN-CRAYS, a parish in Billericay district, Essex; on the river Crouch, 2 miles E S E of Billericay, and 4½ N N W of Pitsea r. station. Post-town, Billericay. Acres, 1, 453. Real property, £2, 307. Pop., 262. Houses, 44. The property is divided among a few. The manor, with the Ashes, belongs to F. M. B. Batard, Esq. The living is a rectory in the diocese of Rochester. Value, £370. Patron, F. Francis, Esq"

The parish was re formed on 2 September 1996 from Basildon unparished area.

== Demographics ==
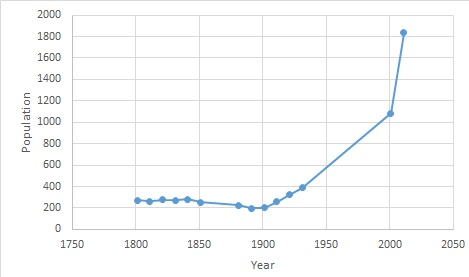
Ramsden Crays population time series 1801–2011

=== Population ===
Between 1801 and 1931, population growth in Ramsden Crays was small, growing by 117 when compared to the large change between 1931 and 2001 where the population grew to 1,085. Population growth had been relatively stable before 1931. Between 2001 and 2011, the population grew more to 1,838. This population spike was the result of the illegal Irish traveller site, Dale Farm, that grew in size in the late 1990s.

=== Occupational structure 1831 ===
The earliest known record of occupation in Ramsden Crays was in 1831, it listed males over the age of 20 in 9 different occupation categories. Similar to the occupational structure of 1881, agriculture was the dominant employer with 47 of the 75 listed working in agriculture, predominately as labourers. 17 men worked in retail and handicraft, this field was most likely split into more clear-cut roles for the 1881 census and beyond. Nearly every other role were occupied by 1–2 men. Some roles not occupied by men may have been occupied by women who were not recorded at the time of recording.

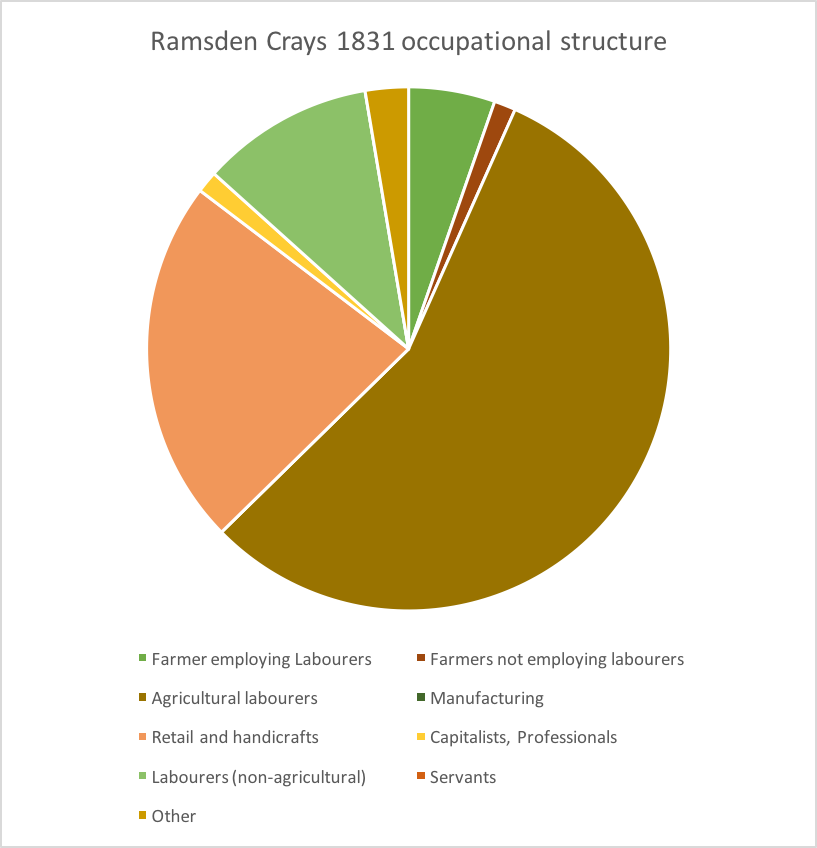
Ramsden Crays 1831 Occupational Structure

=== Occupational structure 1881–2011 ===
The occupational structure for men and women in Ramsden Crays in 1881 illustrates that for men, agriculture was the dominant employer. Agriculture made up nearly2/3 of employment with 33, of these 24 were working as farm labourers. The remaining male occupations in Ramsden Crays like gamekeeper, carpenter and blacksmith were occupied by 1–2 people maximum, highlighting the dominance of agriculture in the parish. The female occupational structure was dominated by women who did not work or did not have a listed occupation, making up more than half of women. Women were also excluded from many occupations such as agriculture, commercial and vegetable substance services. In contrast, educational and dress making occupations were only occupied by women.

The occupational structure between men and women in 2011 compared to that of men and women in 1881 is very different. For men, in 2011, there where a wider range of industries people worked in, increasing from 11 in 1881 to 17 in 2011. Agriculture, which had been the dominant occupation in 1881, employing 33 people employs only 4 in 2011, showing agriculture is no longer the dominant industry in the parish. Construction and the Repair of Motor Vehicles and Motor Cycles are now the most dominant industries, making up just under a half of occupations, showing that for males there is a wider range of employment opportunities. The employment opportunities for females have also increased from 11 in 1881 to 17 in 2011. In 1881, women working in Domestic Offices and Services made up more than half of the female working population, with the number of women without a listed occupation made up a quarter. By 2011, women were working in wide range of occupations, similar to that of the male occupation structure. Education and Human Health and Social Activities are the dominant female occupations, but, together they make up less than a third of the female occupations.

Occupational structure for males and females in Ramsden Crays 1881-2011

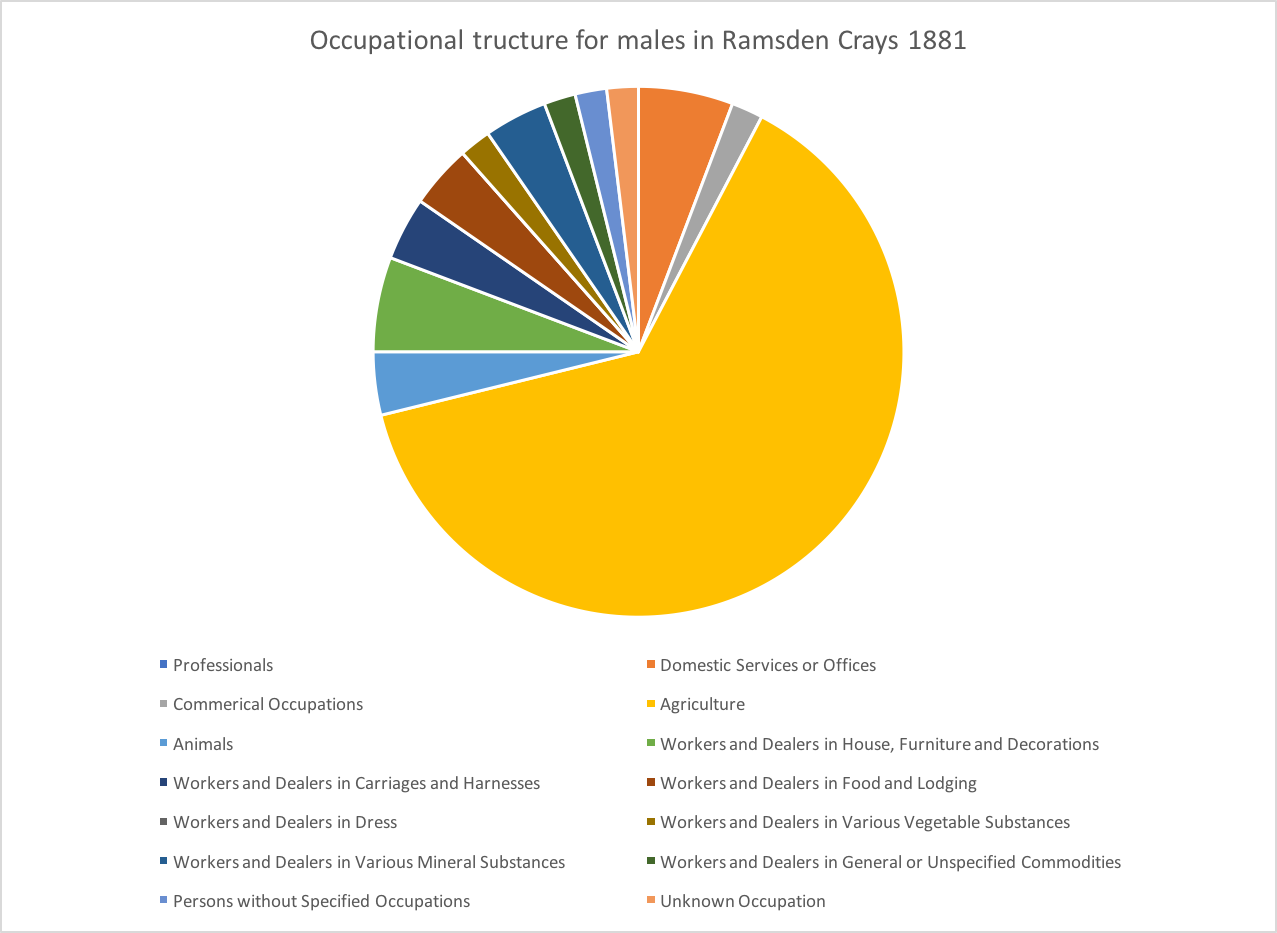

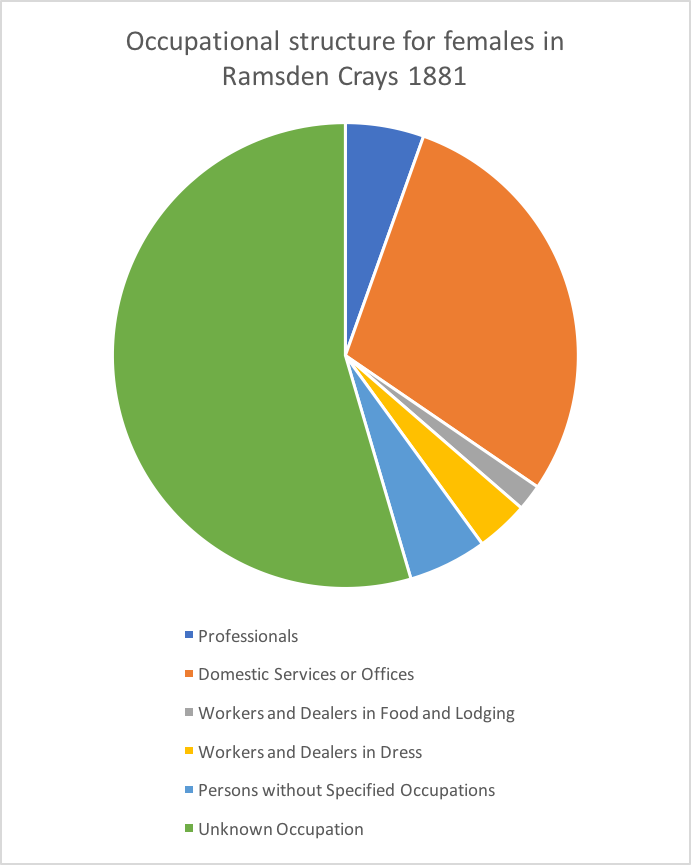

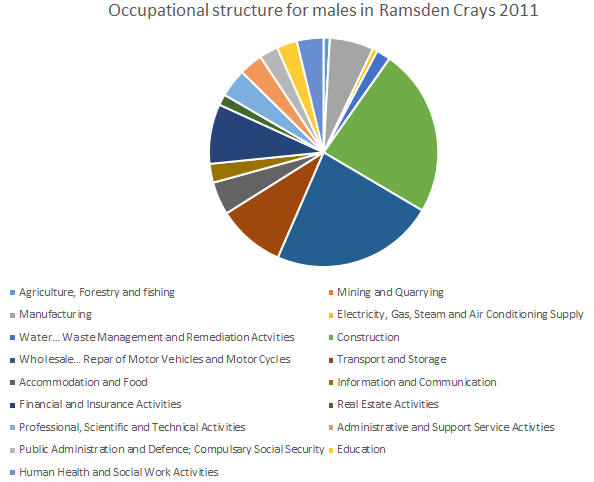

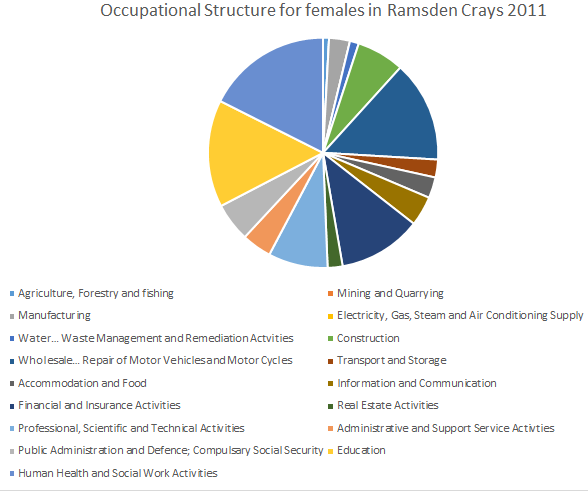

=== Ramsden Crays – 2011 ===
As of the 2011 census, half of residents in the parish are economically active, 737 of 1,289 residents aged 16–75 are either self-employed or employed full or part-time. Of the 517 economically inactive residents in the parish, 184 are retired, 24 are full-time students, 274 are looking after family members or their home, 24 are disabled and 11 are economically inactive for an unspecified reason. There is only one school in Ramsden Crays, Crays Hill Primary school. The school made headlines in 2004 when an influx of traveller children came into the school, leading to local parents in the village withdrawing their children from the school and moving them elsewhere due to fears surrounding the quality of teaching, 200 were withdrawn overall leaving only 44 pupils, all of them from Dale Farm Ramsden Crays is 4 miles from two hospitals, Basildon University Hospital and Mayflower Community Hospital. General health in the parish is good, 1,595 residents report 'very good' or 'good' health in the 2011 census with only 73 reporting 'very bad' or 'bad' health. In addition, 192 residents reported providing unpaid care work 1–50 hours per week, with 1,646 reporting no unpaid care per week. The closest train station is 4 miles away in Wickford.

== Dale Farm ==
Dale Farm, the largest traveller site in Europe was located in Ramsden Crays. Basildon council had initially given permission for 40 English travellers to live on the site in the 1970s. The land was bought in 1996 by an Irish travelling family for £122,000 and after 2001 the population of 'Gypsy/Irish' 'travellers' started to grow, peaking at 675 in 2011 Many families started moving to Dale Farm in 2001, leading to legal disputes with Basildon council. In 2005, part of the site was declared illegal by inspectors, however, the 'traveller' community continued to oppose the council's decision, leading to a public enquiry being launched in 2006. This proved unsuccessful as in 2009 Lord Justice Pill ruled that the site was illegal. It was not until March 2011 that Basildon Council voted to go ahead with the eviction of 400 travellers living their illegally. The eviction itself took place on 19 October 2011. Altercations with the police from protesters led to the arrests of 45 people and 15 police officers injured. By the end of the day, the illegal section of the campsite had been cleared

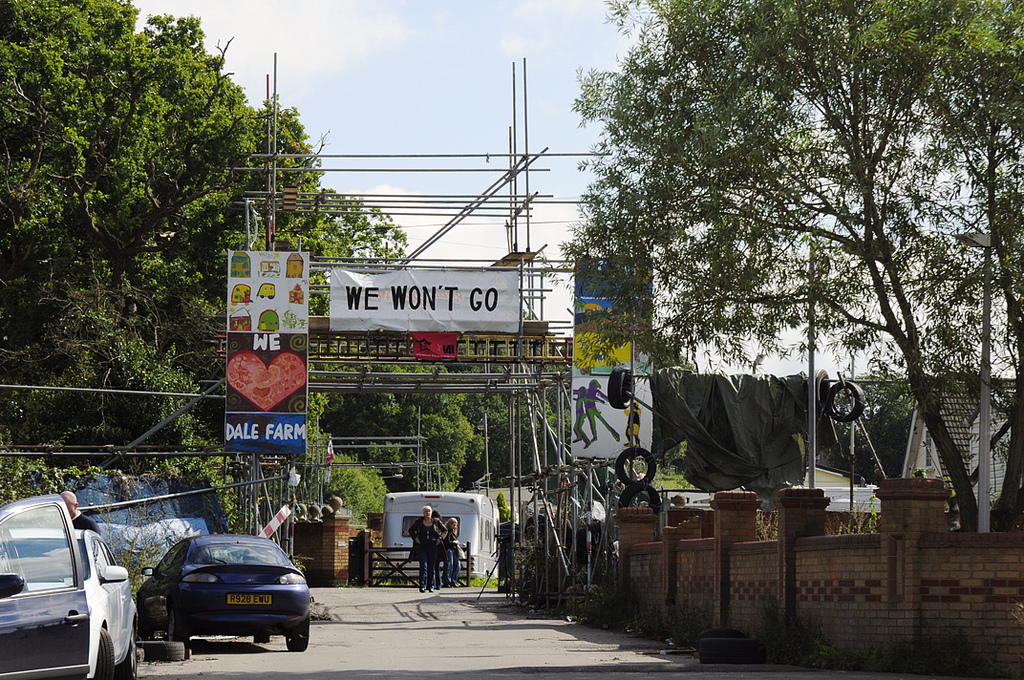
Dale Farm Entrance

== St Mary's Church ==
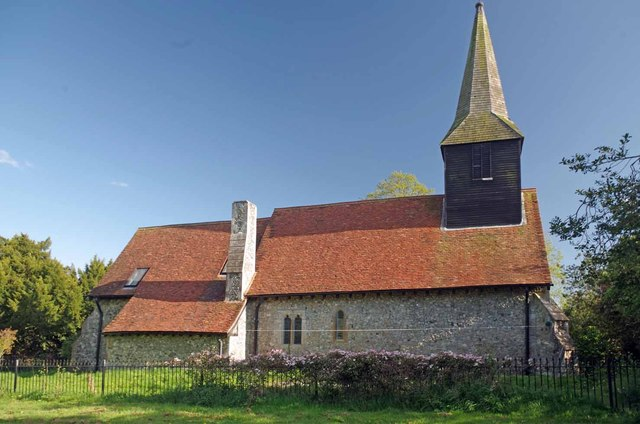
St Mary's church

The 15th-century church of St Mary's has been converted to a private house. The entire church, excluding the bell tower and the broach spine was entirely rebuilt in 1871. Few elements of the original 15th-century church do remain. It is a grade II* listed building. In 1617, Thomas Bartlet described St Mary's Church:

"Parish Church of St. Mary stands near the middle of the parish. The church has been entirely re-built in modern times, but incorporates some old work. In the S. wall of the chancel is a window with two 15th-century cinque-foiled heads to the lights and part of the moulded label of the same date. The N. wall of the nave has two windows, both with old splays and rear-arches; the eastern window has also jambs and head of two trefoiled lights with a moulded label, all of c. 1400".

== Listed buildings ==
There are two listed buildings recorded in the National Heritage List for England for Ramsden Crays.

Name	Grade	Location	Type	Completed (Note: The date given is the date used by Historic England as significant for the initial building or that of an important part in the structure's description.)	Date designated	Grid ref. (Note: The grid reference is based on the British national grid reference system, sometimes known as OSGB36, used by the Ordnance Survey.) Geo-coordinates	Notes	Entry number (Note: The "List Entry Number" is a unique number assigned to each listed building and scheduled monument by Historic England.)	Image	Wikidata
Church of St Mary	II*	Church Lane	church building		4 July 1955	TQ7080193358; 51°36′47″N 0°27′56″E		1122251	Church of St Mary More images	Q17557054
Great Wasketh Farmhouse	II	Gardiners Lane North			20 September 1988	TQ7196491147; 51°35′35″N 0°28′52″E		1275884	Upload Photo	Q26565439
