= The Cliff, Burnham-on-Crouch =

Protected area in Essex, England

Coordinates: 51.636°N 0.775°E

- Site of Special Scientific Interest
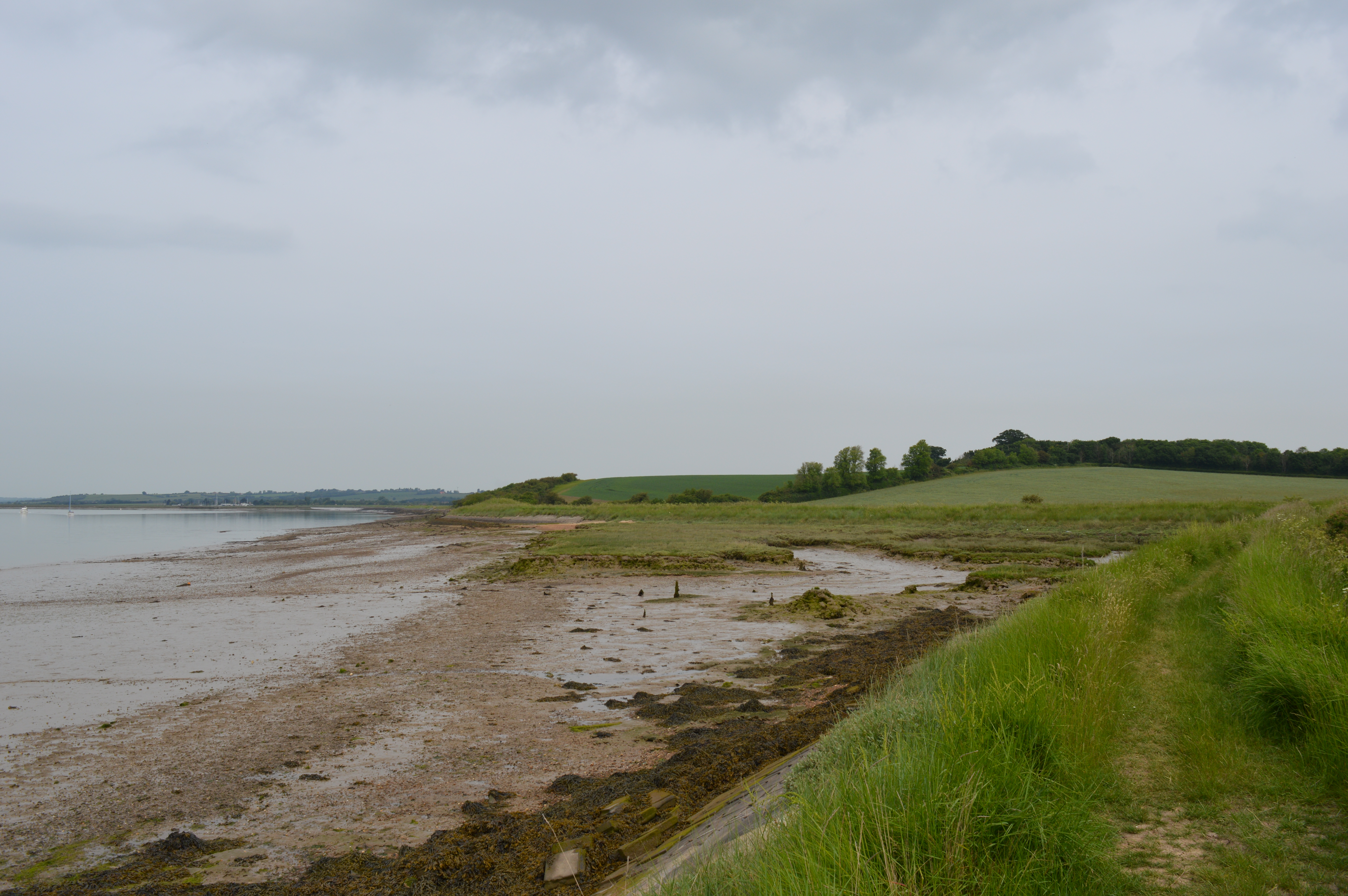
- Location of The Cliff, Burnham-on-Crouch.
- Area of search: Essex
- Grid reference: TQ 922976
- Interest: Geological
- Area: 4.0 ha (9.9 acres)
- Notification date: 1986
- Location map: Magic Map

The Cliff, Burnham-on-Crouch is a 4 hectare geological Site of Special Scientific Interest (SSSI) on the bank of the River Crouch between Burnham-on-Crouch and North Fambridge in Essex. It is also part of the biological SSSI, Crouch and Roach Estuaries. It is a Geological Conservation Review site both for its fossil birds and for its fishes and amphibians.

Fossils birds dating to the Lower Eocene, around 55 to 48 million years ago, have been found at this site, and it has yielded the type material of two species, Coturnipes cooperi and Parvicuculus minor. Considerable quantities of fossil fishes have also been found, mainly sharks, and it is the type locality for several species.

The site can be viewed from the riverside path between Burnham-on-Crouch and North Fambridge. No geology is visible.
