= Lion Creek and Lower Raypits =

Nature reserve in Essex, England

Coordinates: 51.619°N 0.776°E

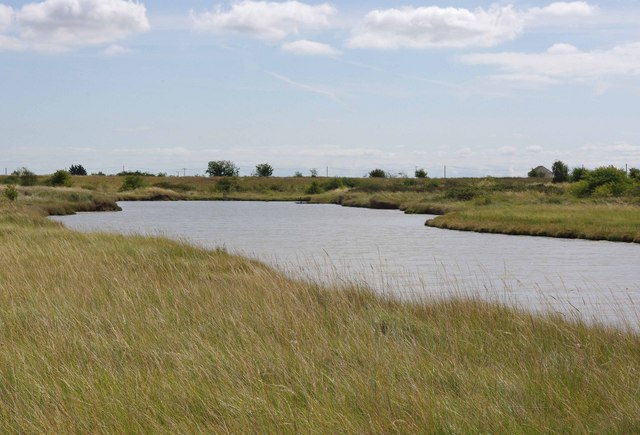
- Interactive map of Lion Creek and Lower Raypits
- Type: Nature reserve
- Location: Canewdon, Essex
- OS grid: TQ 923 948
- Area: 65.2 hectares (161 acres)
- Manager: Essex Wildlife Trust

Lion Creek and Lower Raypits is a 65.2-hectare (161-acre) nature reserve east of Canewdon in Essex. It is part of the Crouch and Roach Estuaries Site of Special Scientific Interest, and is owned and managed by the Essex Wildlife Trust.

The former creek has been cut off from the Crouch Estuary by a seawall, and it has salt marsh plants such as golden samphire and sea-spurrey. There is a bird hide from which many species of sea birds can be seen. Lower Raypits can be accessed from Lion Creek by the seawall path. It has a variety of pasture, salt marsh and intertidal habitats, with nationally scarce plants such as beaked tasselweed, sea barley, grass vetchling and curved hard-grass. Invertebrates include Roesel's bush-cricket.

There is access from the road between Canewdon and Wallasea Island.
