= Woodham Fen =

Nature reserve in Essex, England

Coordinates: 51.647°N 0.597°E

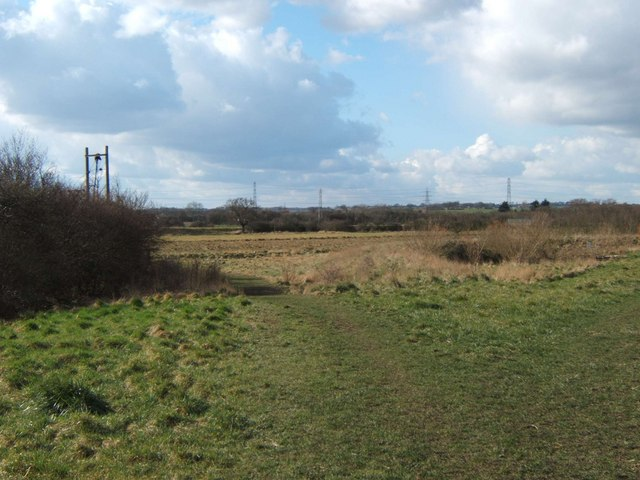
- Interactive map of Woodham Fen
- Type: Nature reserve
- Location: South Woodham Ferrers, Essex
- OS grid: TQ 798 975
- Area: 8.1 hectares (20 acres)
- Manager: Essex Wildlife Trust

Woodham Fen is an 8.1-hectare (20-acre) nature reserve in South Woodham Ferrers in Essex. It is managed by the Essex Wildlife Trust. It is part of the Crouch and Roach Estuaries Site of Special Scientific Interest.

The site lies between two tidal creeks which run into the River Crouch. It has saltmarsh and rough grassland with an unusual transition zone between them. Birds include reed buntings, yellow wagtails and meadow pipits, and there are common lizards and slowworms.

There is access at the Shaw Farm roundabout, at the junction of Burnham Road and Ferrers Road.
