= Althorne =

Village in Essex, England

Coordinates: 51°39′17″N 0°45′48″E

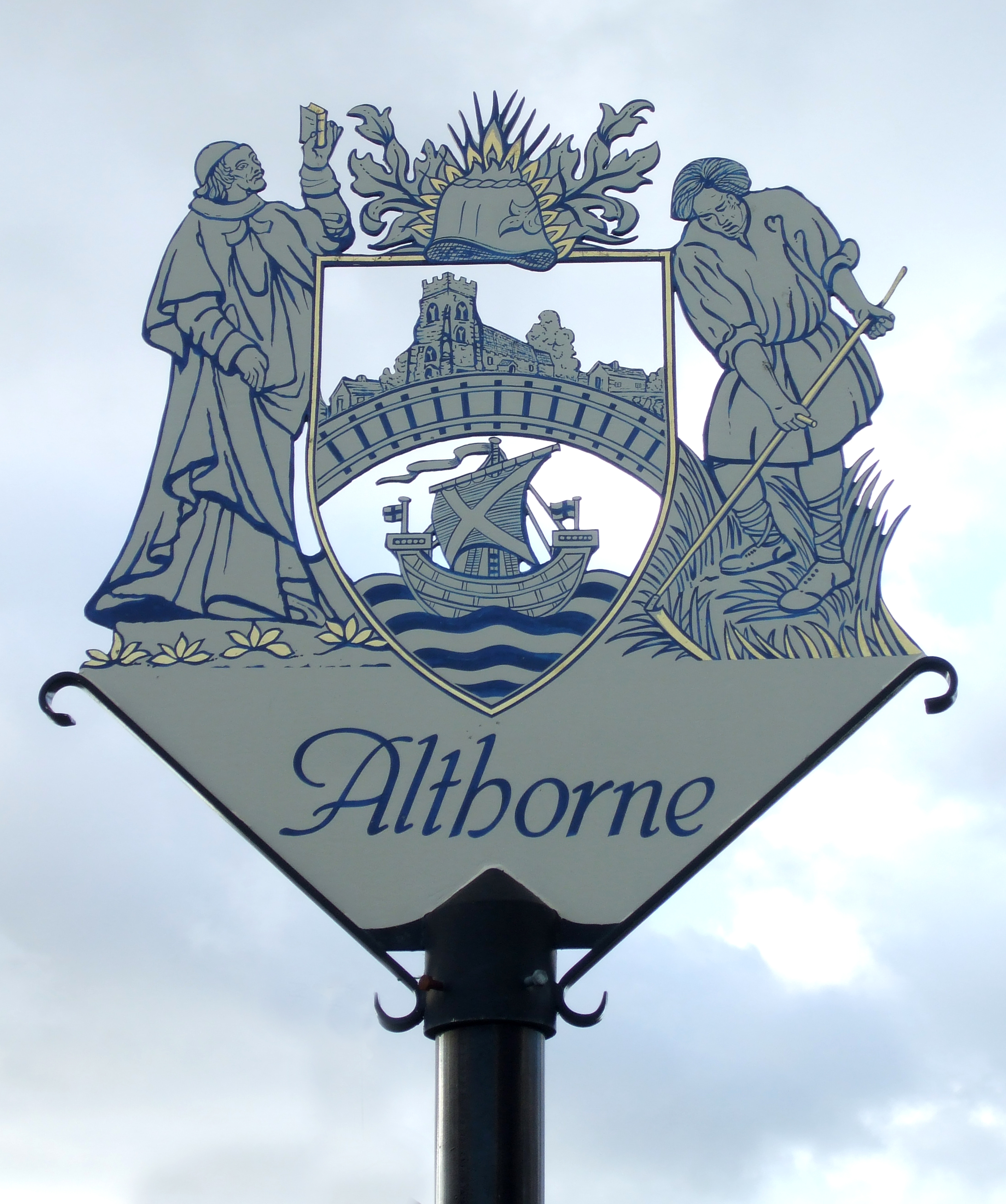
- Althorne Village Sign

- Location within Essex
- Population: 1,213 (Parish, 2021)
- OS grid reference: TQ912987
- Civil parish: Althorne
- District: Maldon
- Shire county: Essex
- Region: East
- Country: England
- Sovereign state: United Kingdom
- Post town: CHELMSFORD
- Postcode district: CM3
- Dialling code: 01621
- Police: Essex
- Fire: Essex
- Ambulance: East of England
- UK Parliament: Maldon

Althorne is a village and civil parish in Essex, England. It is located 13 miles (21 km) east-southeast of the county town and city of Chelmsford. The village is in Maldon district and in the parliamentary constituency of Maldon & East Chelmsford. The village has its own Parish Council.

Althorne is on the Dengie peninsula, about 3 miles (4.8 km) north-west of Burnham-on-Crouch. It is approximately 2 miles (3.2 km) north-west of the centre of Bridgemarsh Island in the River Crouch. At the 2021 census the parish had a population of 1,213.

== Etymology ==
The name Althorne has an unusual meaning in Old English, translating as '(place at) the burnt thorn-tree'. The name is composed of the words æled ('burnt') and thorn ('thorn-tree'). The earliest known recording of the village was in 1198 as Aledhorn.

== Transport ==
=== Bus ===
A bus service 331/32 to Chelmsford.

=== Rail ===
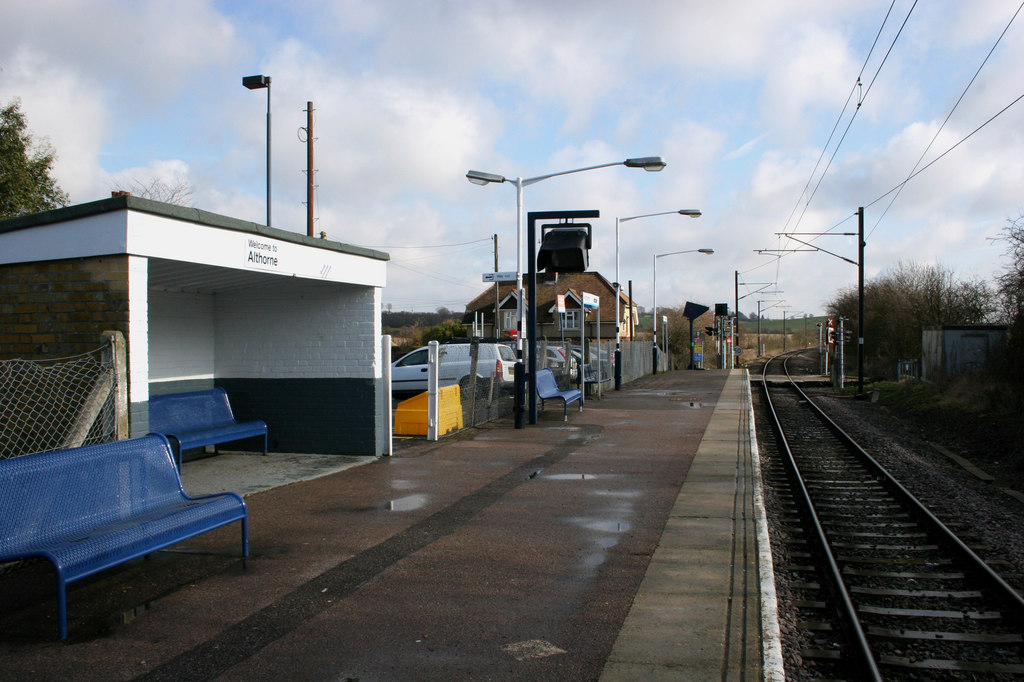
Althorne rail station

Althorne railway station is on the Southminster Branch Line. The station is set apart from the main village, only accessible from a long and steep track leading up to the edge of Althorne. The rail service, operated by Greater Anglia connects to London via Wickford.

=== Road ===
There are no A roads close to the village – the main roads being the B1010 to Burnham and the B1018 road from Maldon to nearby Southminster.

== Governance ==
An electoral ward of the same name exists. The population of this ward at the 2011 Census was 4,128.

== Religion ==
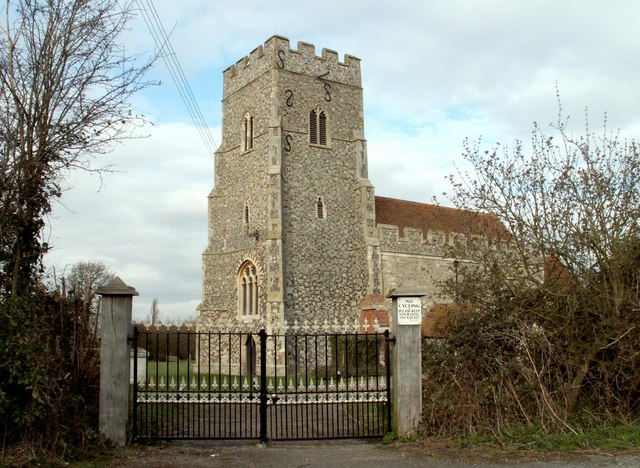
St Andrew's church

St Andrew's church in Althorne, Essex is a Grade II* listed building. It dates back to the late 14th century. The chancel was added to the nave in the 16th century and the tower in 1500. The south porch is 18th century. The chancel was altered in the 20th century.

== Notable people ==
- Phillip Scott Burge moved to Althorne just before World War 1. He became one of the top British fighter aces, with 11 enemy kills between March and July 1918. He was killed when he was shot down over Seclin, France on 24 July 1918.
- Mark Lubbock (1898–1986), British conductor and composer of operetta and light music, lived with his wife, the writer Bea Howe (1898–1992), at The Old Forge, Althorne, for many years from the 1940s onward.
- John McVicar (1940–2022) convicted armed robber and journalist, was living in a caravan in Althorne at the time of his death.
- Hilda Ormsby (1877–1943), British academic and geographer, died in Althorne.
- Harrison Scott (born 1996), British racing driver, was born in Althorne.

== Bridgemarsh Marina ==
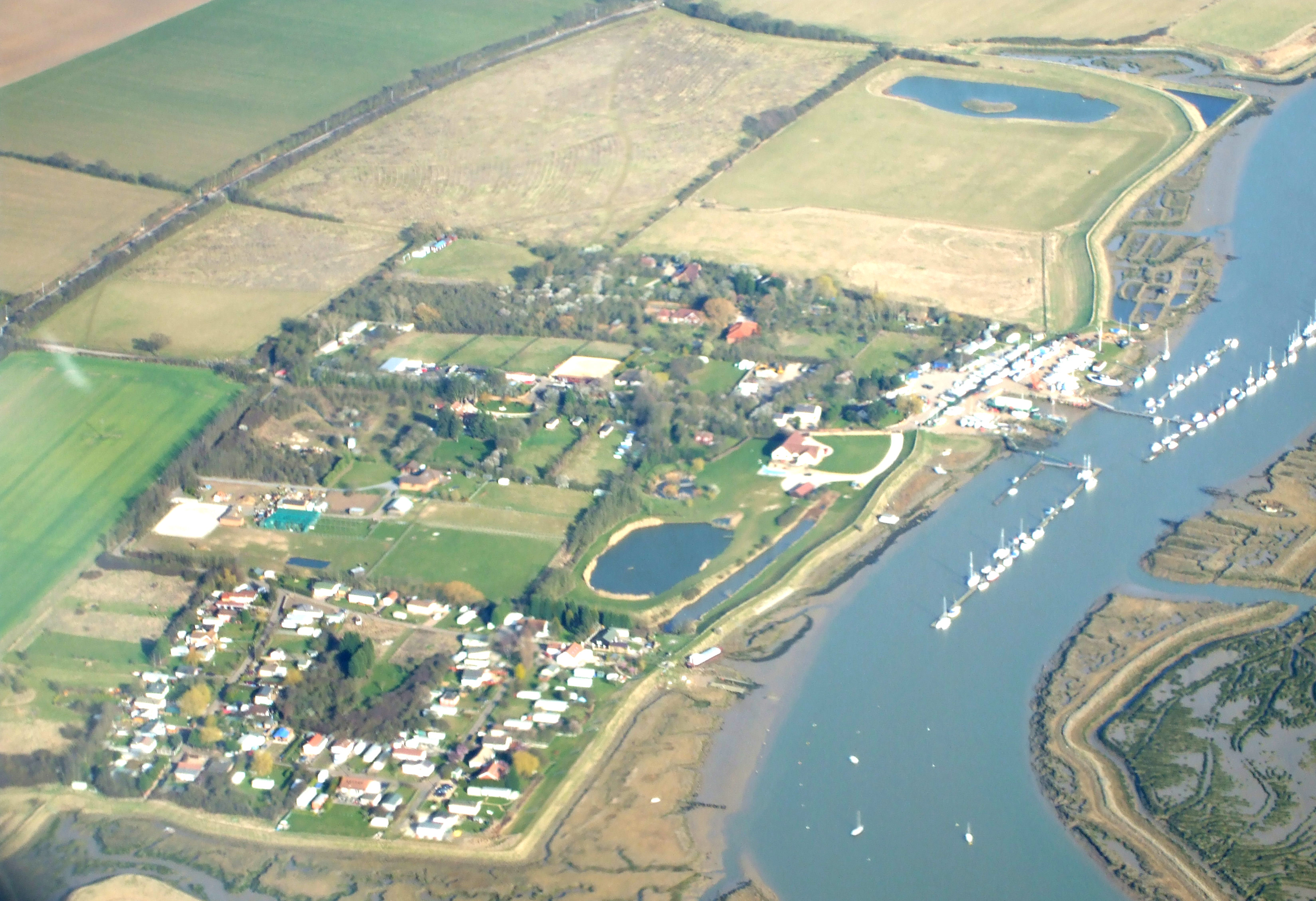
Bridgemarsh Marina

The Marina is approximately one to two miles from the village and close to Althorne Railway Station. It is reached by Bridgemarsh Lane, an unserviced road. The Marina is situated on Althorne Creek. On the south side of the creek is Bridgemarsh Island.

== In the news ==
- 31 October 1967 (Daily Mirror newspaper):
  - Miss Margery fights to win back a loo / White-haired Miss Margery Moore has claimed "squatters rights" to a country railway station - in an attempt to have the ladies' loo re-opened. / For twelve years, Miss Moore, a botanist, travelled by train to Althorne, Essex, to study plant life in the marshes there. / Regularly, 60-year old Miss Moore spent her penny at the village station's loo, collected her size 6 wellington boots from a porter, and waded off into the marshland where she has two wooden huts. / Then, a derailment in the line burst a pipe and put the ladies and the gents' out of order. / That was eleven weeks ago. But both loos are still closed. And the nearest public convenience is five miles away. / Miss Moore, who lives in London, is most annoyed. / She has written to British Rail saying "I the undersigned having been a passenger on British Rail from Althorne to Liverpool-street and back for more than twelve years claim squatters rights in the station, its amenities, services personal and mechanical as they were before the late derailment." / Miss Moore said yesterday "This mechanical bit means the ladies. Everyone is hideously inconvenienced." / A British Rail spokesman said last night, "Inquiries are in hand."
