= Rettendon Brook =

River in Essex, England

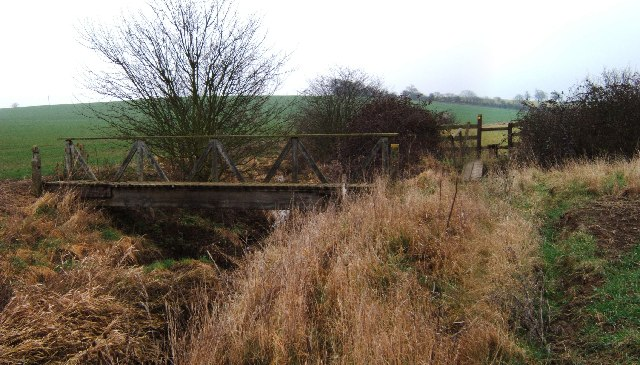

Physical characteristics
- Source: Coalhill
  - coordinates: 51°39′01.4″N 0°32′01.2″E
- Mouth: River Crouch
- Length: 3.0 mi (4.8 km)

Rettendon Brook is a 4.795 km (3.0 mile) tributary of the River Crouch, in South East Essex. It arises in South Hanningfield and runs east through Rettendon to South Woodam Ferrers where it discharges into the river Crouch along the tidal Fenn Creek.

== Catchment ==
The catchment area of the Rettendon Brook is 10.98 km^{2} (1098.07 ha). The catchment extends from Warren Road South Hanningfield in the west; Rettendon Little Common in the north; Rettendon church in the south; to near Shaw's farm (A132 roundabout) in the east. The catchment is approximately 5.3 km east to west and 3.3 km north to south.

== Route ==
From its source at Coalhill in South Hanningfield (51°39'01.4"N 0°32'01.2"E) the Rettendon Brook flows eastwards past Marks Farm, under the A130 road, to Rawlings Farm, then south of Pound Farm, east across Rettendon parish crossing the Saffron Trail. It discharges into Fenn Creek near the roundabout at start/end of the A132 road, which is the normal tidal limit of the creek (51°39'00.3"N 0°35'48.7"E). Fenn Creek is 3 km (1.86 miles) long and flows south to the River Crouch of which it is a tributary. The creek marks the western extent of the urban area of the town of South Woodham Ferrers. The Creek forms part of the Fenn Washland nature reserve.

== Environmental ==
The Environment Agency assesses Rettendon Brook to have a ‘moderate’ ecological status. Its hydromorphological designation is: heavily modified. A summary of monitoring results for 2022 is as follows.

Rettendon Brook monitoring results 2022
Classification item	Classification 2022
Ecological	Moderate
Biological quality elements	Bad
Physico-chemical quality elements	Moderate
Hydromorphological support elements	Supports good
Supporting elements	Good
Chemical	Does not require assessment
Priority hazardous substances	Does not require assessment
Priority substances	Does not require assessment
Other pollutants	Does not require assessment

== See also ==
- Fenn Washland
