= Fenn Washland =

Nature reserve in Essex, England

Coordinates: 51.6374°N 0.60842°E

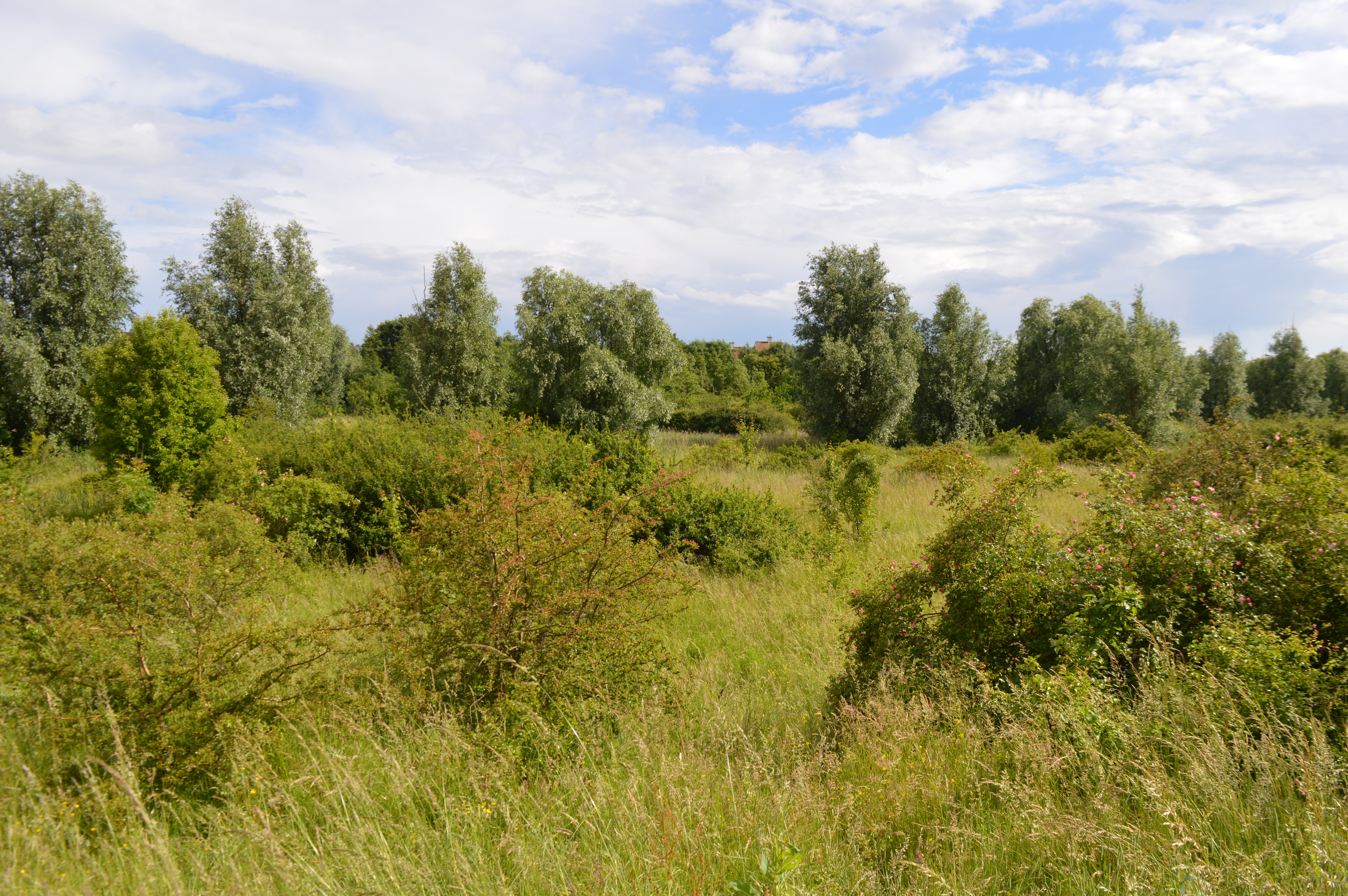
- Interactive map of Fenn Washland
- Type: Local Nature Reserve
- Location: South Woodham Ferrers, Essex
- OS grid: TQ806964
- Area: 4.9 hectares (12 acres)
- Manager: Essex County Council

Fenn Washland is a 4.9 hectare Local Nature Reserve in South Woodham Ferrers in Essex, England. It is owned by Essex County Council and managed by the council as a part of the nearby Marsh Farm Country Park.

The Washland is formed around the tidal Fenn Creek which is a tributary of the River Crouch. The northern end of the creek is fed with fresh water from the Rettendon Brook.

The site is undeveloped wetland in a valley surrounded by housing. It has grassland, swamp, scrub, ponds and reedbed, providing diverse habitats for wildlife.

There is access to a footpath round the site from Inchbonnie Road, but no formal paths within the site itself.
