= Hilda Ormsby =

British academic and geographer

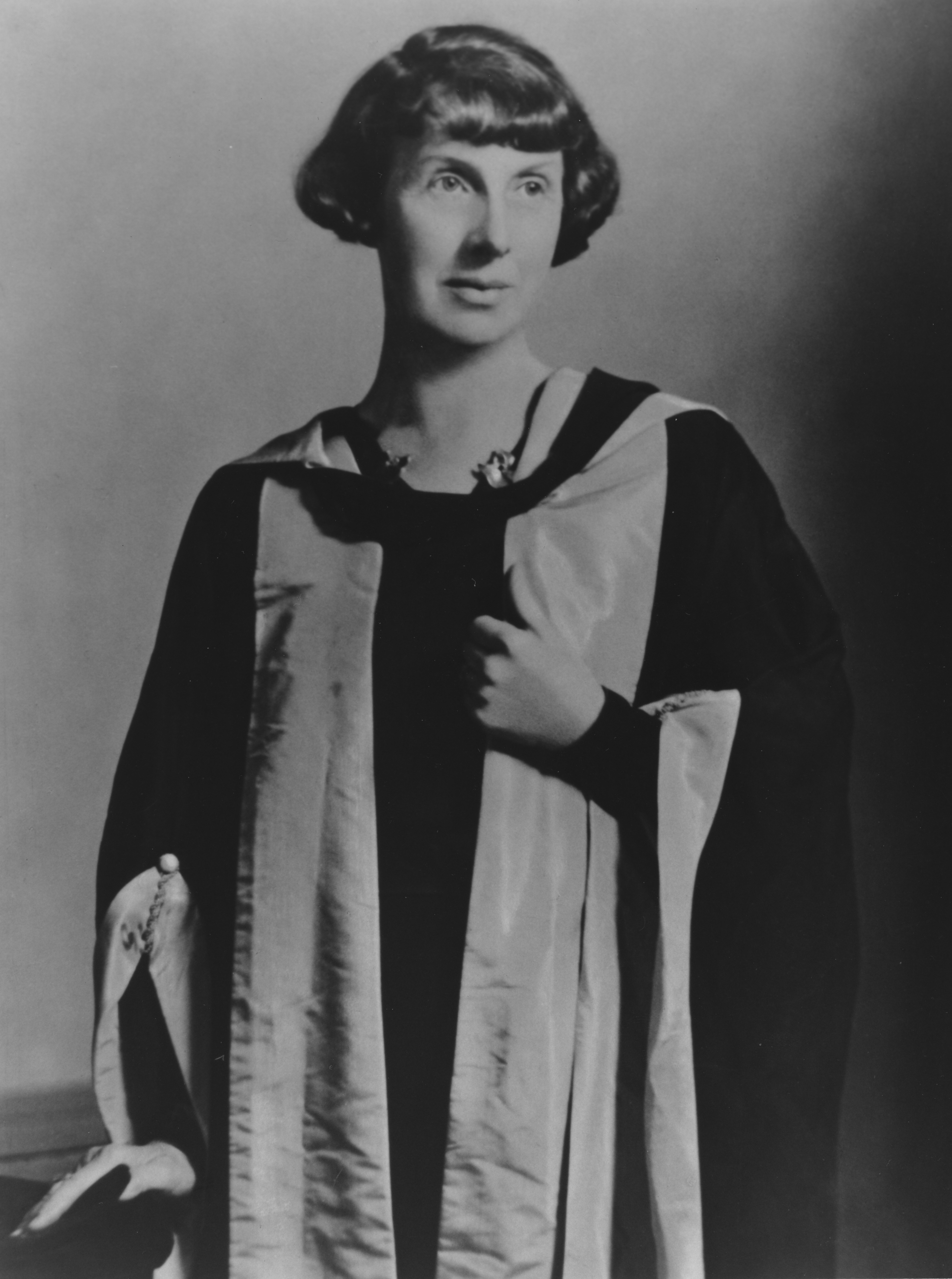
- in about 1931
- Born: 1 November 1877; Hanley, Staffordshire
- Died: 23 October 1973 (aged 95); Althorne
- Education: London School of Economics and Political Science (LSE)
- Occupation: Geographer
- Employer(s): London School of Economics and Political Science (LSE)
- Spouse: George V Ormsby
- Relatives: Llewellyn Rodwell Jones (brother)

Hilda Ormsby born Hilda Rodwell Jones (1 November 1877 – 23 October 1973) was a British academic and geographer.

== Life ==
Ormsby was born in Hanley, Staffordshire in 1877. Her father was a minister and the family moved around the country frequently when she was growing up. Despite this she took a certificate in Geography in the organisation that would be very important to her - the London School of Economics and Political Science (LSE). After this she moved to France where she studied French and German and minor subjects at the École Normale de Melun. In 1911 she and brother, Llewellyn, discovered the lectures given by the LSE geographer Halford Mackinder on Saturday mornings for school teachers. She became an geography demonstrator in the following year and did sound work there during World War One whilst lecturing and studying. One of her tasks was creating terrain maps of the Western Front for Naval Intelligence. She graduated in Geography despite the course being for three years. In recognition she became one of their lecturers in 1918.

In the following year her brother, Llewellyn, returned to her side at the LSE leaving his position in Leeds and arriving with a good war record. She and Llewellyn had a symbiotic relationship. They worked together with no show of competition even sharing the delivery of some courses. In 1925 her brother succeeded Halford Mackinder as head of the department. Her London on the Thames (1924) "is thought to be the first geographical text on London".

In 1931 she obtained a DSc in Geography which was a rare achievement and it was based mainly on her book that year about French regional and economic geography. Two years later she and twelve other founded the Institute of British Geographers as the Royal Geographical Society was focused on exploration. This would merge with the Royal Geographical Society in 1995.

In 1936 she became the first woman to serve on the council of the Institute of British Geographers and she was there for a year. This is exceptional for a woman as it was twelve years before another woman served on the council.

In 1962 she became both a fellow of the LSE and the Royal Geographical Society.

Ormsby died in Althorne in 1973.
