= Crays Hill =

Village in Essex, England

Coordinates: 51.602°N 0.4708°E

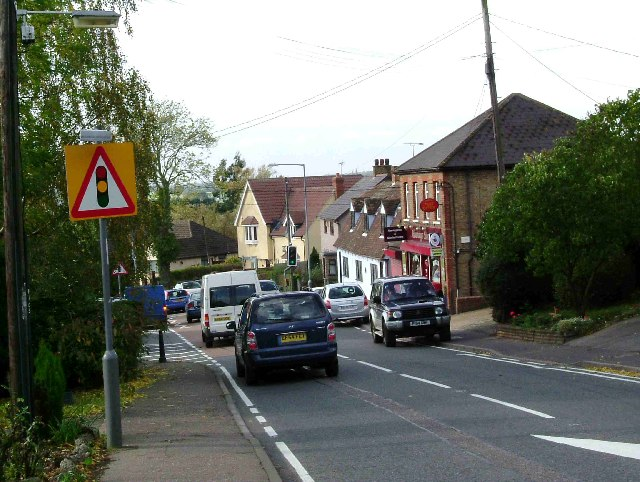
- Crays Hill

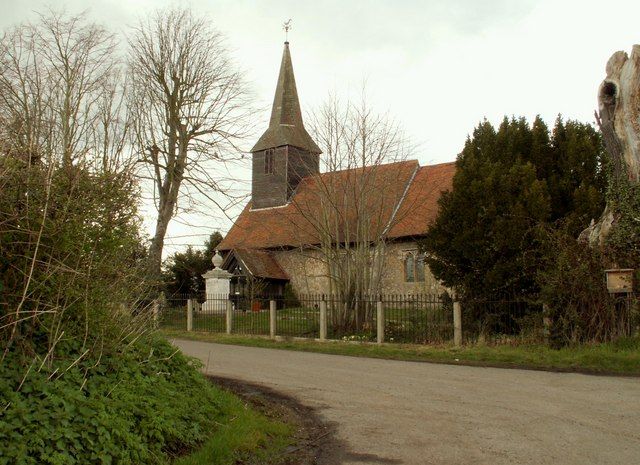
- The church at Crays Hill

- Location within Essex
- OS grid reference: TQ712921
- Civil parish: ramsden crays
- District: Basildon
- Shire county: Essex
- Region: East
- Country: England
- Sovereign state: United Kingdom
- Post town: BILLERICAY
- Postcode district: CM11 2
- Dialling code: 01268
- Police: Essex
- Fire: Essex
- Ambulance: East of England
- UK Parliament: Billericay

Crays Hill is a village in the Basildon borough of Essex, England. The River Crouch passes under Church Lane.

The village was listed in Domesday Book of 1086 when the Lord of the manor and tenant-in-chief was Sasselin of Layer.

Crays Hill was part of the civil parish of Ramsden Crays until 1934 when it was abolished to enlarge South Hanningfield.

== Dale Farm ==
Crays Hill is the site of Dale Farm, once the largest Irish Traveller site in Europe. There has been a long-running legal battle by Basildon Council to evict the travellers who have illegally built upon green belt land. The council sent in police and bailiffs on 19 October 2011 to clear the disputed section of the site.
