= Crouch and Roach Estuaries =

Nature reserve in Essex, England

Coordinates: 51.638°N 0.699°E

Crouch and Roach estuaries
- Site of Special Scientific Interest
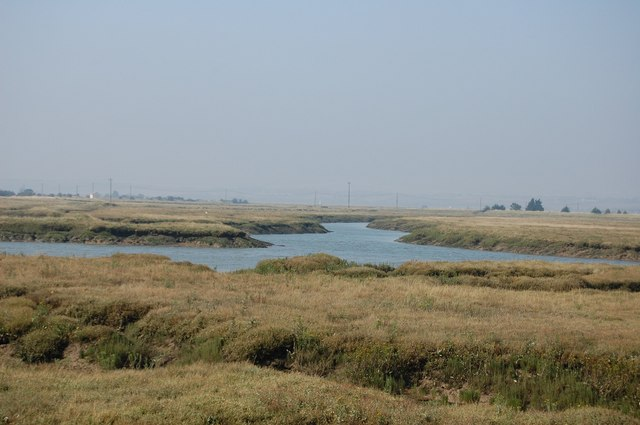
- Paglesham Creek
- Location of Crouch and Roach estuaries.
- Area of search: Essex
- Grid reference: TQ870970
- Interest: Biological
- Area: 1,729.1 ha (4,273 acres)
- Notification date: 1990
- Location map: Magic Map

The Crouch and Roach Estuaries are a 1729 hectare biological Site of Special Scientific Interest (SSSI) at the mouth of the Crouch and Roach rivers in Essex. The Crouch part of the SSSI stretches from near Battlesbridge to Foulness Island, and the Roach from Rochford to the junction with the Crouch. Part of the site is in the Mid-Essex Coast Special Protection Area under the EC Directive on the Conservation of Wild Birds, and a Ramsar wetland site of international importance. It is also part of the Essex Estuaries Special Area of Conservation. An area of 65 hectares is managed by the Essex Wildlife Trust as the Lion Creek and Lower Raypits nature reserve and 8 hectares at Woodham Fen, both of which are managed by the Essex Wildlife Trust. A small area is also a geological SSSI, The Cliff, Burnham-on-Crouch.

The site has salt marsh, intertidal mud, grazing marsh and a fresh water reservoir. The salt marsh has scarce species including lax-flowered sea-lavender and one-flowered glasswort. Rough grass has dense populations of the nationally scarce Roesel's bush-cricket. The site is internationally important for wintering dark-bellied brent geese, and nationally important for black-tailed godwits, shelducks and shoveller ducks. There are Red Data Book species of invertebrates such as the ground lackey moth.
