= Bridgemarsh Island =

Island in the River Crouch, Essex, England

Coordinates: 51°38′18″N 0°44′6″E

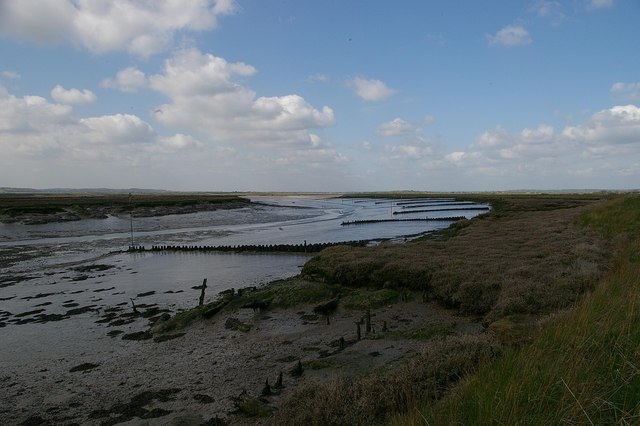
Bridgemarsh Creek showing part of the edge of Bridgemarsh Island to the left of the creek.

Bridgemarsh Island is in the tidal part of the River Crouch in the English county of Essex, three miles upstream from Burnham-on-Crouch. The main river channel runs to the south between the island and Canewdon, and it is separated from the mainland to the north by Bridgemarsh and Althorne Creeks, channels of the estuary.

Following a flood in 1736 Bridgemarsh Island was enclosed by a sea wall and a causeway was built giving access at low tide.

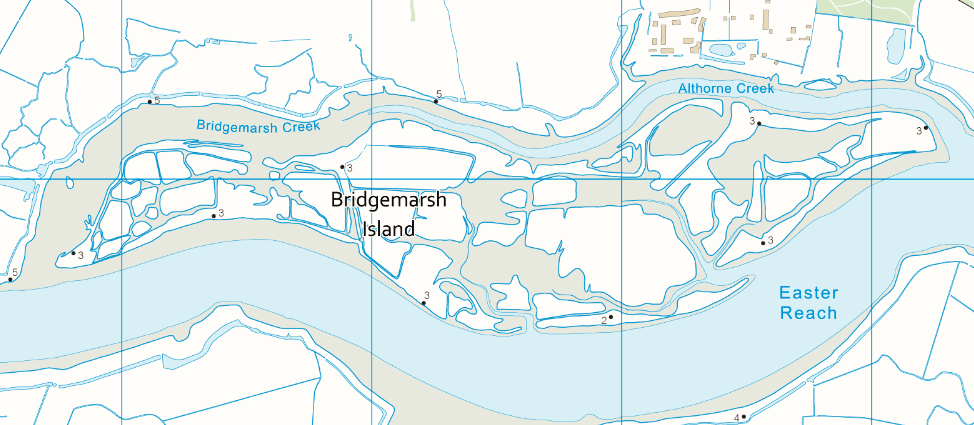
Map of Bridgemarsh Island

Farming was supplemented by industry with the island used as a source of clay. This led to the construction of a brickworks of which the chimney (at grid reference TQ890967) survives. A tramway linked these works to a quay that was used by Thames barges. Shortsightedly, no serious effort was made to maintain the sea wall. The flood of 1953 caused the end of regular occupation of the island, which is now a haven for wildlife and salt marsh flowers. It is owned by the Bridgemarsh Island Trust.

== Source and Reference ==
- Further details
- Islands of Essex by Ian Yearsley, pp.93-5
