= Dale Farm =

Land area in Crays Hill, Essex, England

Coordinates: 51.595°N 0.474°E

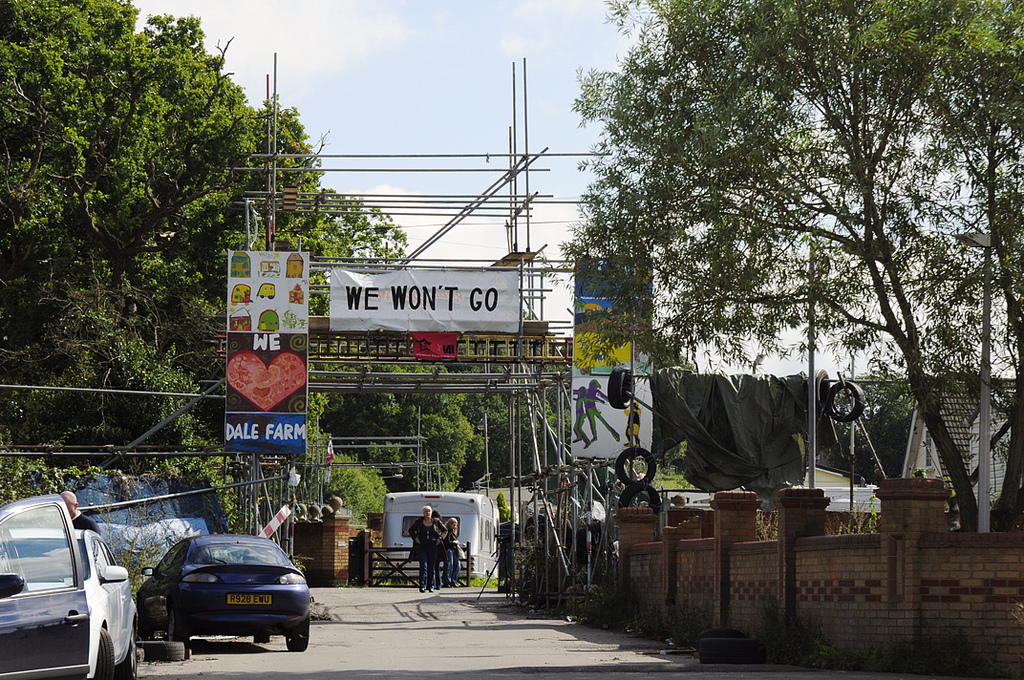
- Dale Farm Entrance, scaffolding and "We won't go" sign

- Location within Essex
- District: Basildon
- Shire county: Essex
- Region: East
- Country: England
- Sovereign state: United Kingdom
- Post town: BILLERICAY
- Postcode district: CM11 2
- Dialling code: 01268
- Police: Essex
- Fire: Essex
- Ambulance: East of England
- UK Parliament: Basildon and Billericay

Dale Farm is a plot of land situated on Oak Lane in Crays Hill, Essex, United Kingdom. Until October 2011, it was the site of one of the largest Traveller concentrations in the UK, at its height housing over 1,000 people, along with the adjacent Oak Lane site. Although Basildon District Council had granted permission for the site to be used by a small number of Traveller families, no planning permission was given for the expansion of the site into land located within the Green Belt.

The establishment of the illegal plots led to Basildon District Council conducting a ten-year legal battle in the High Court to gain a clearance order to evict the Travellers from Dale Farm. The decision to bring in police officers to remove some activists and residents from the site and give safe access to the contracted bailiffs gained international press coverage, with the overall eviction costing the council £4.8 million.

== Dale Farm ==
Dale Farm is a six-acre plot of land on Oak Lane, near the A127 Southend Arterial road. Dale Farm has been subject to Green Belt controls since 1982. Next to the Dale Farm site there is an authorised Travellers' site known as Oak Lane. This has council planning permission, and provides 34 legal pitches.

Dale Farm cottage was leased to Ray Bocking, a scrap metal dealer in the early 1960s, who lived at the Dale Farm cottage. Land in the north-east corner was used as a scrap yard without planning permission until 2001. Bocking said that the Dale Farm site "was originally concreted over by Basildon Council", and a contractor who worked for him said that the council had regularly dumped waste tarmac and rubble from roadworks on the site in the 1980s and 1990s. Basildon Council denied involvement with putting down hardstanding on the farm, saying it served enforcement notices against Bocking in 1992 and 1994. Eventually Bocking was bankrupted by costs arising from breaching the Green Belt provisions. The council rejected his bid for permission to continue his business in 1996.

During the 1970s, 40 English Romani Gypsy families were allowed to live beside the scrap yard. As a site for Travellers, Dale Farm was started in the 1980s when a planning appeal was won by two families against Basildon District Council on the southern end of the site with the help of Robert Home, then a professor of land management from Anglia Ruskin University. Home also claimed that although it was in the Green Belt, even 30 years ago the area was described as mixed use. In the 1990s, the council ceded limited permission to the Gypsy families adjoining Dale Farm, before deciding against granting further permissions as other parts of the site were occupied. Traveller William Saunders won permission for himself and other family members at the adjacent Oak Lane site after a lengthy legal tussle with Basildon Council from 1987.

A planning application by travellers for a 20-pitch site was submitted in 2001, but was refused by the council. Travellers claimed they subsequently applied for planning permission several times and were consistently "ignored" by the council.

Two Irish travellers, Patrick Egan and John Sheridan, and a third man purchased the cottage and the green fields around it from Bocking for £120,000 in 2002. The local residents reported a clear difference between the behaviour of the English Gypsies and the Irish travellers. Around that time more Irish travellers began to arrive and the Gypsies decided to move on. At this time unplanned development started. The site quickly expanded from eight plots to more than 30 by 2003. New residents who moved on to the site did not obtain planning permission for their caravans and chalets. Various planning breaches were reported. The Council has said that planning applications for the caravans and chalets on the site were rejected because the land was Green Belt.

Basildon Council first served enforcement notices in 2001, and the Traveller families brought legal action. The enforcement notices ordered that the land be restored to its original state. The Travellers residing there applied for retrospective planning permission, prompting a series of public inquiries. Each of these ruled that the site was illegal.

A temporary order was granted in 2003 by the then Secretary of State, John Prescott which allowed residents two years before eviction. In reference to this, the government's Communities and Local Government department, in their report on Site Provision and Enforcement for Gypsies and Travellers, in, wrote:

The site has a long and contentious planning history. Temporary permission was granted by the Secretary of State ... with the intention that this would give the site residents and the local authority time to find a suitable alternative site. However, no such progress has been made, and the local authority has now received a homelessness application for the 400 people who claim that eviction from the site will leave them homeless. At the same time, opposition amongst parts of the settled community towards site residents has become ever fiercer, with parents from the settled community withdrawing their children from the school attended by children from Dale Farm, and the view regularly expressed in letters to the local press that Gypsies and Travellers living on the site are somehow 'above the law'.

The site continued to expand, and the Travellers residing there applied for a judicial review of the eviction decision.

Basildon Council's Development Control Committee minutes state that: "In June 2005, once the two-year compliance period had lapsed, the Council resolved that direct action was necessary to secure compliance with the notices. It was this decision (reconsidered in December 2007) that was then made the subject of Judicial Review proceedings, which were heard in February 2008."

The Traveller residents won this decision in the High Court in May 2008, only to see it overturned by the Court of Appeal at the beginning of 2010.

In 2008, Essex County Council's Racial Equality Council funded a £12,000 community centre at the site, built without planning permission.

=== The Dale Farm Travellers ===
An article in the local newspaper, the Echo, quotes an English Romany Gypsy, Joe Jones, that the site was first stopped at by Travelling families during the 1970s. The article reported that residents of the nearby village claim the "influx" of Irish Travellers which followed in 2001–2002 caused a rise in conflict with the "settled community" and that most of the "English Travellers" to have subsequently "sold up as they are said not to mix" with the Irish Travellers.

In 2002 a land dispute allegedly led to the death by shooting of Billy Williams, for which Oak Lane Traveller Paul Saunders was found innocent.

Ownership of the unauthorised portion appeared to rest with the Sheridan family of Travellers. Richard Sheridan is the chairman of the Dale Farm Housing Association. He is also a former chair of the Gypsy Council for Education, Culture, Welfare and Civil Rights (GCECWCR).

A reporter for the Echo claimed that some Travellers are linked to driveway surfacing in continental Europe, and door to door sales of electrical goods in Australia and Iceland, some of a "dangerous or counterfeit" nature.

The Daily Telegraph newspaper reported that "new evidence has emerged" that some residents have cultural roots in the town of Rathkeale, County Limerick, Ireland, and some own property there. The newspaper said of the residents: "They deny any connections, yet some of them appear on deeds of homes, others on planning applications for houses and yet more on the electoral register." It also notes that Matthew Brindley, of the Irish Traveller Movement in Britain, said: "Some people might have property elsewhere but the vast majority do not." Jake Fulton, of Save Dale Farm, said: "If this is true I would be very surprised."

The Travellers also have links to the local area, with many of their children attending a local Crays Hill school in Billericay.

Early in the morning of 19 May 2005, a fire swept through a chalet, killing both John and Cathleen McCarthy and destroying three adjacent caravans. The travellers later stated that this was the only time the local community interacted with them in a positive manner, laying flowers at the site.

The Council questioned why pitches in the legal part of the site are usually unoccupied. However, "Grattan Puxon, a campaigner for Travellers, said the owners would spend much of the year travelling. ... and some of the plots also had to be vacated before the electricity company carried out work at some of the plots"

Robert Home stated in a telephone interview that

"the travellers [sic] would normally be on the road between April and October and use a more permanent site over the winter months. But many had remained at Dale Farm for a longer period to counter the threat of eviction."

In February 2009, Billericay MP John Baron urged the priest of the local Catholic Church in Wickford to use his "influence to persuade the travellers to leave the site to avoid confrontations over the eviction". The priest responded that instead, he would be joining the anti-eviction protests, and that the church had already offered to provide temporary shelter for mothers and children of the community.

=== 2011 eviction ===
In October 2011, a legal process that had taken ten years, reaching as far as the Court of Appeal, concluded with the ruling that Basildon Council has acted lawfully in refusing planning permission for the disputed portion of Dale Farm.

Prior to the clearance of the illegally occupied portion of the site, the entirety of Dale Farm contained about 100 families.

On 15 March 2011, Basildon Council voted 28 to 10 to move 86 families from Dale Farm. During a series of secret talks over the following six months between Travellers leader Richard Sheridan, council leader Tony Ball and head of planning Dawn French, the Travellers demanded £6 million to relocate to authorised and potential new sites outside Basildon.

On 4 July, eviction notices were served on some 90 families living on the illegal half of the Dale Farm site, giving them until 31 August 2011 to leave. The eviction date was set for the week beginning 19 September 2011, and electricity supplies to the site were planned to be cut off on the morning of the eviction.

On 26 August a temporary 50 mph. speed limit was applied to a two-mile stretch of the A127 carriageway by Essex County Council, anticipating an influx of slow-moving caravans and trucks joining the road when the eviction commenced. Local road blocks were then introduced in areas surrounding Dale Farm. Farmers in the area blockaded their entrances to prevent illegal occupation of their land.

The British firm of bailiffs, Constant and Co., was given the £2.2 million contract to clear 54 pitches at Dale Farm.

On 15 September the Council asked that the residents "peacefully vacate" the unauthorised site, and stressed that it would meet its duty to house homeless families as the law demands.

On 19 September a mediation offer by Jan Jařab, the regional representative of the UN High Commissioner for Human Rights, was rejected by the Foreign Office.

Camp Constant was a team of human rights monitors, established in a campsite within Dale Farm. The camp was organised by the Dale Farm Solidarity group with the support of the Travellers. A mixture of concerned locals and activists arrived from Britain and various countries in Europe after it was established on 27 August.

That morning, a bailiff addressed the residents, expressing health and safety concerns regarding the barricades and the possibly forceful eviction.

However, following court evidence given by Mary Sheridan and others, Mr Justice Antony Edwards-Stuart sitting at the High Court in London that day issued an injunction. He stated that the proposed measures 'may go further' than the terms of the enforcement notices. He said the council must notify the families individually about the precise nature of enforcement actions planned against them, and must give them a chance to respond. Enforcement could not occur before 23 September, and water and electricity must not be cut off.

Basildon Council said on 20 September:

The High Court yesterday granted an injunction preventing the Council from undertaking any physical measures to secure compliance with the outstanding planning enforcement notices and also to prevent the electricity and all other utilities from being cut. (There was never any intention for the Council to cut the water supply).

Before the injunction of 19 September, the eviction was expected to involve the removal of around 400 residents, including about 100 children.

On 3 October, Mr Justice Edwards-Stuart ruled that Basildon Council could remove caravans from 49 of 54 plots. The council was also told it could remove the majority of concrete pitches on the site, but walls and fences would remain. Travellers had lodged applications for three separate judicial reviews which delayed action. On 13 October, Mr Justice Duncan Ouseley ruled against these appeals, saying residents were constantly violating criminal law and must be removed to prevent "the criminal law and the planning system being brought into serious disrepute".

Lord Justice Jeremy Sullivan, ruling on a referral to the Court of Appeal on 17 October, advised representatives of the Dale Farm residents that they could not challenge the decision by Mr Justice Ouseley. Following the hearing, Tony Ball announced that, with the exception of three plots where 48 hours notice would be provided, that Basildon council would not provide further notice of when the eviction would start. He encouraged the residents and activists to leave peacefully. On behalf of the residents, Mrs. Kathleen McCarthy said that the decision meant that the Travellers would be forced back onto the road.

A spokeswoman for the Dale Farm Solidarity group advised on 17 October that the site had gone into "lockdown" and the perimeter had been reinforced around the 49 plots, in order to resist eviction of the families affected. The large metal gates at the front of the site were locked and many other entry points were heavily fortified with metal fencing, barbed wire and other items.

BBC correspondent Fergal Keane, who was inside the illegal part of the site, said:

"There is now about an equal split between travellers and supporters. The travellers are certainly grateful for the support of the activists. They are expecting the bailiffs at any time and they are unlikely to come through the front entrance. Wherever they enter the site they are likely to be met by peaceful resistance."

At 7 am. on 19 October 2011 the site clearance of Dale Farm began. Electricity was disconnected. Local MP John Baron said: "Police are using the minimum force required and when you are being pelted with bricks and rocks you are entitled to defend yourself." A Labour MEP for the region, Richard Howitt, said: "The smoke above Dale Farm is the most visible sign of the failure of Basildon Council to seek a mediated solution." More than 100 riot police entered the site through the rear fence, and two people were tasered. About 200 bailiffs followed after 12 pm to begin removing illegally erected buildings. Some of the residents had to be forcibly removed, whilst others left voluntarily. Police spent most of that afternoon removing people from the 12-metre high scaffold tower on the front gate, with the help of cherry pickers.

Around 4:45 pm. on 20 October, a number of Dale Farm Travellers and supporters walked out of the site. Removal of mobile homes on the site by the bailiffs began and media access to the site was restricted for several days.

== Post-eviction ==
On 5 November 2011, following indications that Travellers intended to return to the site, Basildon Council was awarded an order at the High Court to prevent the former residents illegally reoccupying the site.

On 7 November, an application by Dale Farm neighbour and property developer Len Gridley to the High Court to force the Basildon Council to remove debris from the illegal site was denied. His garden backs on to Dale Farm and he had received public death threats. Gridley said the delay in clearing the site has decreased the value of his property, and has criticised the council's decision to allow the size of the legal site to be increased without planning permission.

Essex Police said that there were 34 arrests at the site for offences including violent disorder, breach of the peace and obstruction on 19 and 20 October. A police spokesman said all of the people arrested were activists, not Travellers.

Basildon Council successfully prosecuted two people for obstructing a bailiff and issued cautions to 10 people. It later dropped the prosecution of 14 others. On 17 May 2012, the High Court ruled that Essex Police could not order media groups to release 100 hours of broadcast and unbroadcast material of the eviction.

The Council had said that it planned to return the site to open land, which would take several weeks. They were required to restore any walls and fences damaged during clearance. However since its clearance, the site has been left mostly derelict and overgrown by natural vegetation.

In August 2012 the British Environment Agency collected soil samples from the cleared site for three days. Council contractors entered the site in March 2013 to remove asbestos from a small section; Council leader Tony Ball said the action was necessary because abatement notices had been ignored. Basildon intended to recover the costs from the landowners concerned. The agency reported in May 2013 that there was no significant health risk.

In July 2014, a woman won a £15,000 compensation payout from Essex Police. She claimed that she was assaulted while taking part in the protests against the eviction.

=== New site ===
By April 2012, 83 families displaced by the eviction – including 100 children – had camped on Oak Lane, the private road leading to the former site, and also in the adjoining authorised site. Dale Farm resident Mary O'Brien said that "Tony Ball knows that we have nowhere else to go".

The Council development control committee voted in December 2012 to send bailiffs in to move the caravans, subject to a High Court judicial review. However, in February 2013, Basildon approved a plan for 15 double caravan pitches at a government-owned site in Gardiners Lane South, about 700 yards' distance from Dale Farm. The Council leases this land from the Homes and Communities Agency.

=== Cost ===
After the decision to clear the site, the Council prepared budgetary statements for costs, with a worst case expense estimated at £8 million. Before the injunction of 19 September, the Council said that "The estimated direct operational cost of £6.5m together with estimated post operational costs of £1.5m produce a total of £8m." Predictions of the total cost of eviction varied up to £18 million, including legal costs.

In 2012 Basildon Council confirmed that the Dale Farm eviction cost them £4.8 million. This amount included £1.6 million due to contractor expenses resulting from the High Court injunction in September. Essex Police announced that its costs were £2.4 million, and the Home Office had pledged to contribute up to £4.65 million to policing costs. The Department for Communities and Local Government also contributed £1.2 million. Basildon Council intended to recover costs from the landowners after the clearance, however these efforts failed, partly because of the difficulty of identifying landowners' whereabouts.

Legal aid to residents from 2005 to September 2011 totalled £188,000; costs were paid by the Legal Services Commission. During later court hearings the travellers were represented on a pro-bono basis.

== Commentary and media ==
The Peace and Progress Party has advocated on behalf of the Travellers at Dale Farm. The party called a meeting at Parliament in June 2006, following which the actor and activist Corin Redgrave collapsed at a council meeting at Basildon Town Hall.

In their Annual Report and Accounts for 2006/7. the former Commission for Racial Equality (CRE) said:

In 2005, we reported that we had obtained leave to intervene in a judicial review case involving a decision by a local authority to evict a large group of Irish Travellers from an unauthorised encampment on the Dale Farm site in Basildon in 2005. We argued that the council had failed to pay due regard to its requirements under the race equality duty to promote race equality and good race relations when taking the decision to evict. This case was postponed until 2007, due to outstanding planning appeals.

And later, as the Equality and Human Rights Commission and the Committee on the Elimination of Racial Discrimination (CERD):

The UK has been the object of an enquiry from CERD under the early warning and urgent action procedure. During its 76th session in February 2010, CERD considered the impending eviction of an Irish and Romani Traveller community from Dale Farm in Essex. The committee expressed concern that the planned eviction of the Traveller community from Dale Farm might imply a breach of Article 5 e (iii), guaranteeing the right to housing.

As the largest travellers' site in Britain, Dale Farm drew much media interest. The site was featured on the Channel 5 reality programme At War with Next Door in December 2006. It was also featured on the "Children of the Road" episode of the CBBC series My Life, and in the Channel 4 series, Big Fat Gypsy Weddings.

In July 2011, the expected eviction of the Travellers was the subject of the BBC television documentary entitled The Big Gypsy Eviction. On 19 September 2011, Channel 4's documentary Dispatches: The Fight For Dale Farm covered the relationship between travellers, residents affected by encampments, and the law.

In November 2011 the BBC apologised to Basildon Council after an investigation found that the One Show had broadcast a clip on the Dale Farm eviction that was biased towards the Travellers. The five-minute segment was broadcast on 14 February that year.
