= Wallasea Island =

Low lying island on coast of Essex, United Kingdom

Coordinates: 51°36′N 0°50′E

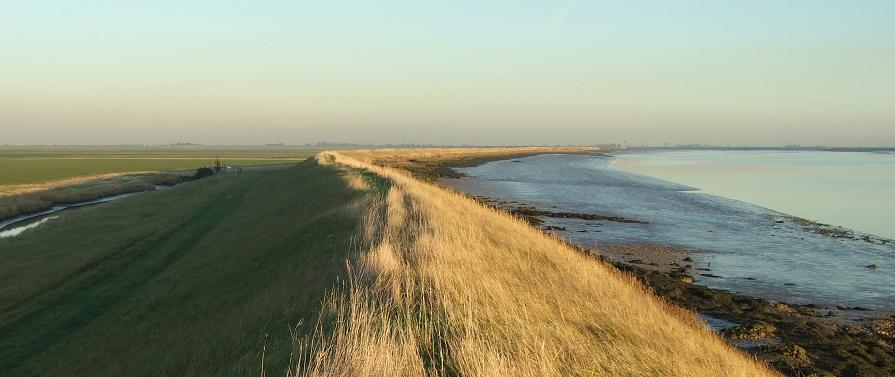
The southern sea wall of Wallasea Island, with the estuary of the River Roach to the right.

Wallasea Island lies in Essex, England. It is bounded to the north by the River Crouch, to the south east by the River Roach, and to the west by Paglesham Pool and the narrow Paglesham Creek. The population of the island is included in the civil parish of Canewdon.

Much of the island is farmland, and wheat is the main crop. A small settlement at its western end is linked by road to the mainland and is home to a campsite and marina. It is linked by a ferry to Burnham-on-Crouch.

It is possible to walk for about 8 mi (13 km) around most of the sea wall. The south side of the island is one of the most tranquil places in Essex, where wildlife typical of open farmland such as skylarks, corn buntings and hares can be observed. Close by, on the opposite side of the estuary of the River Roach, Foulness Island and Potton Island are visible.

== History ==
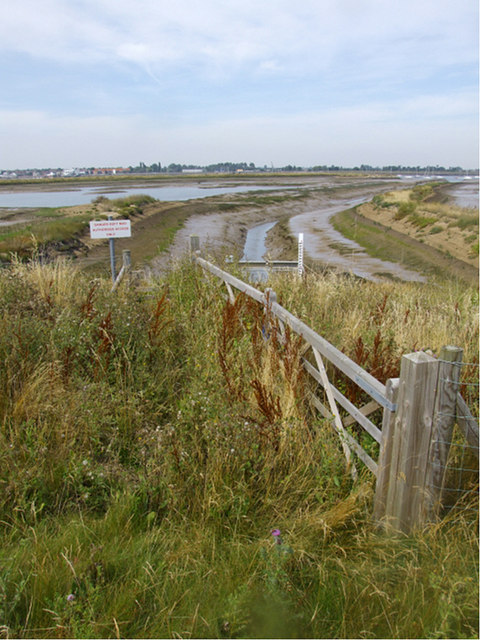
Wallasea Island vista

The name is said to derive from Old English "wala" meaning "foreigner" and the suffix -ey, meaning island. Almost nothing is known about the early history of Wallasea. At the end of the last ice age it was almost certainly dry land like most of the North Sea basin. Rising sea levels are thought to have deposited the silt and sand which (together with older clays) underlie the island's soil. Several archaeological features have been recorded on the south and east edges of the island, these are the "red hills" typical of the Roman period and were probably relics of a process of extraction of salt from sea water.

Thirteenth-century records mention several places on Wallasea such as Lower Barn and Sherwoods. It is likely that Wallasea was used for grazing at that time and there may have been some arable land too. The origins of the various farms is unclear, though it is known there was a farmhouse at Grapnells as far back as 1546. Saxton's map of 1576 shows that creeks divided Wallasea into three separate islands, and this is confirmed by Camden's description of 1551.

In the 15th century these lands were drained by Dutch settlers for agricultural use with the construction of the original sea wall. The population of Wallasea was at its highest in the mid to late 19th century. In 1875 there were 135 inhabitants and there were 13 houses. A school was opened in 1879 and lasted for 20 years. Import of cheap American wheat resulted in an agricultural depression starting in 1875. Most of the island's population left and Wallasea reverted to pasture.

Much of the island was ploughed up during the First World War when the import of grain was made more difficult by German U-boats. Bumper crops of wheat were grown in this period. The island was also under the plough in the Second World War.

Over the centuries Wallasea has been flooded in a number of storms. The most catastrophic inundation was in 1953 after which large sections of sea wall had to be rebuilt. The eastern end of the island was one of the last places in the UK to be drained of floodwater. The storm swept away the Tyle House, sometimes known as the Devil's House, which according to legend was the abode of a demon.

== Wallasea Wetlands ==
On July 4, 2006, a £7.5 million project to convert part of the island's farmland into mudflats and salt marsh was completed by bulldozing 300m of the sea defence wall, at the points of maximum pressure on the estuary. An area of 115 hectares was flooded, which is evolving into wetland, mudflats, saline lagoons and seven artificial islands. The wetlands are intended to provide winter grounds for wading birds, and ease flood problems on the River Crouch.

In December 2008, the RSPB submitted a planning application to Essex County Council for a £12 million scheme to break open Wallasea's remaining sea walls and turn the rest of the island's farmland into a wetland bird reserve. In September 2012 it was announced that work had begun on the Wallasea Island Wild Coast Project under which around 4.5 million tonnes of earth were transported to Wallasea Island, via over 1500 separate trips, many by rail and water, to help create the nature reserve from London's Crossrail tunnel (Elizabeth line) excavation.
