= River Crouch =

River in Essex, England

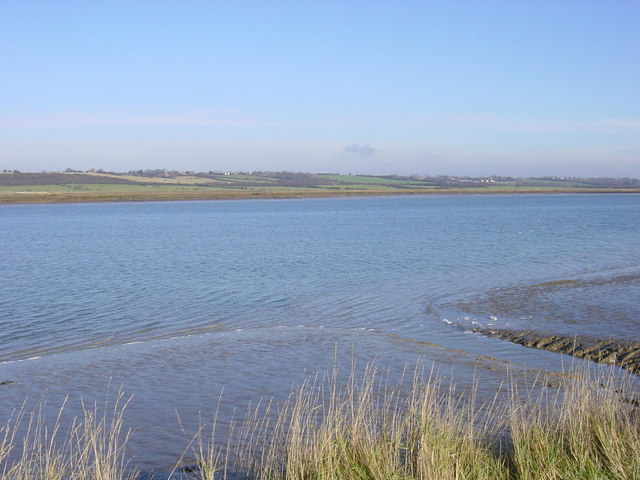
- View of River Crouch near Canewdon, Essex looking towards Bridgemarsh Island and Althorne.

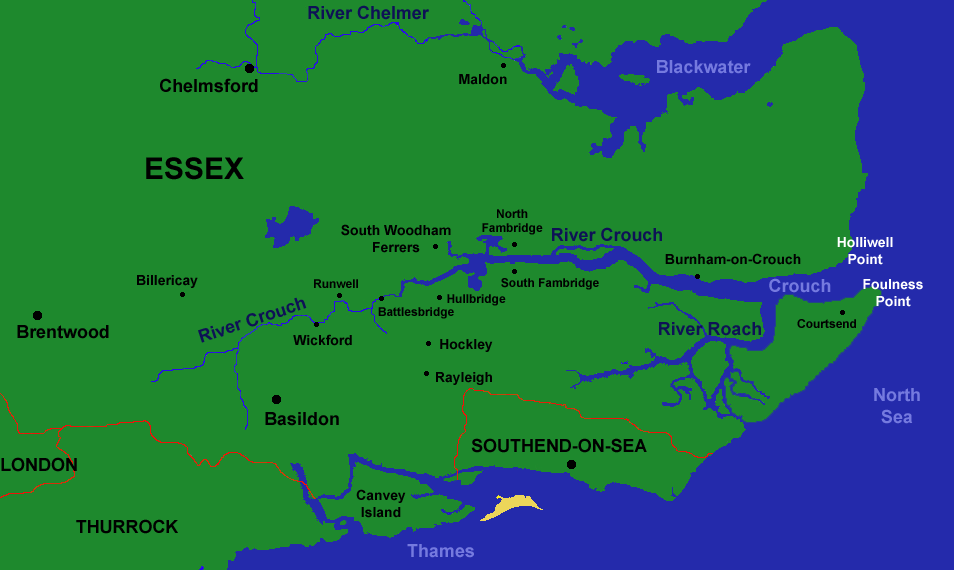
- Map of the River Crouch
- Nickname: The Crouch

Location
- Country: United Kingdom
- Region: Essex
- Towns/Villages: Crays Hill, Ramsden Bellhouse, Wickford, Runwell, Battlesbridge, Hullbridge, South Woodham Ferrers, North Fambridge, South Fambridge, Althorne, Creeksea, Burnham-on-Crouch, Basildon

Physical characteristics
- Source: Springs in The Wilderness woods
  - location: Near Little Burstead, Billericay, Essex
  - coordinates: 51°36′34″N 00°24′32″E
- 3rd source: Langdon Hills
- Mouth: North Sea
  - location: Between Holliwell Point and Foulness Point
  - coordinates: 51°37′36″N 00°56′21″E
  - elevation: 0 ft (0 m)
- Length: 28 mi (45 km), West-east

Basin features
- Tributaries
  - left: Fenn Creek, Clementsgreen Creek, Stow Creek, Bridgemarsh Creek
  - right: Lion Creek, River Roach
- Designation

Ramsar Wetland
- Official name: Crouch & Roach Estuaries
- Designated: 24 March 1995
- Reference no.: 721

The River Crouch is a small river that flows entirely through the English county of Essex.

The distance of the Navigation between Holliwell Point which is north of Foulness Island and Battlesbridge is 17.5 Miles, i.e. 15.21 Nautical Miles.

== Route ==
The Crouch rises in 'The Wilderness' on the Burstead Golf course at Little Burstead. The Wilderness consists of several small ponds surrounded by a tiny area of ancient woodland. The ponds date from around 1250, when they were used for the farming of fish for Stockwell Hall, and also served as a defensive moat for the hall. In the mid 16th century, the hall was moved to a new site, some 250 yards (230 m) to the west, and the original building was dismantled and reassembled to form the rear of the new hall. The new Stockwell Hall received a new frontage in the 18th century, and has two storeys with attics. On the east gable was a large clock with the figures made from blackened bones, but these have largely been replaced by wooden figures. Although the Wilderness is now owned by the golf course, a covenant prevents them from make any changes to it. The ponds are at an elevation of 230 feet (70 m) and after flowing briefly to the north east, the stream follows a more southerly direction, running parallel to the A176 Noak Hill Road for approximately 1.3 miles (2.1 km). It is then joined by another stream, rising to the west of Dunton Wayletts, which passes around a hill, taking it close to the junction of the A127 and B148 roads, before it resumes its course to the north of Dunton Road, to join the stream flowing south from the Wilderness. While the Ordnance Survey mark the northern stream as the Crouch, the Environment Agency water quality data for the Upper Crouch is measured for this southern stream.

The combined flow turns to the north east, and is soon joined by a third stream flowing northwards from Steeple View, by which time its elevation has dropped to 82 feet (25 m). It passes under the A176 road at Noak Bridge, after which it follows a generally easterly course. To the west of Crays Hill it is crossed by the A129 Southend Road, and another stream, flowing northwards from springs and lakes in Gloucester Park Basildon joins it. The river valley skirts the northern edge of Crays Hill and the southern edge of Ramsden Bellhouse, before the Crouch reaches Wickford, close to Wickford railway station. A public footpath runs along the left bank of the river from the bridge at Castledon Road, and forms part of a nature trail. The river turns to the south and is separated from the railway station by allotment gardens and Wickford Junior School. After passing under the A129 road, it turns to the east, and the road crosses it again as it turns to the north. There was severe flooding in this area in 1958, and as a consequence, the course of the river was re-engineered, and runs in a concrete channel with a wider concrete overflow apron. A reservoir for the Great Eastern Railway was constructed in 1907, close to where the railway crosses the river, and was formally opened by Reverend Francis Dormer Pierce, the rector of St Catherine’s Church. It covered an area of just over 2 acres (0.8 ha), and water from the river entered it through a sluice gate. Once the railway was electrified, the reservoir was no longer needed, and it is now part of a car park.

Another tributary joins from the south. It starts at springs in Northlands Park, Basildon, and is also fed by water from a large lake, which was constructed in the 1970s to collect floodwater from developments at Fryerns and Chalvedon. After passing under the A127 Southend Arterial Road at Burnt Mills and flowing along the western edge of Nevendon, it runs parallel to the A132 road. It discharges into the Crouch after passing through a culvert beneath the roundabout where the A129 and A132 meet. Downstream of the railway bridge, the Crouch is crossed by Lower Southend Road, where the concrete channel ends and the river becomes more natural again. It continues to the south of Runwell and forms the northern border of Wickford Memorial Park, after which it is crossed by the Crouch Valley railway. There is a sewage works on the right bank immeditately below the bridge, and the bridge is the highest point on the river to which tides normally flow. As it approaches Battlesbridge, the river is crossed by three bridges, all of which have been part of the A130 road. The first is the Mayrose Bridge, constructed in the early 2000s as part of a scheme to build a replacement A130 road between Chelmsford and the A127 road. The bridge has a span of 119 feet (36.4 m) with two intermediate piers, and provides 10 feet (3 m) of headroom above normal high tide levels. This superseded the Battlesbridge Bypass bridge, which is 1,066 feet (325 m) further downstream, and is now classified as the A1245. There has been a bridge at Battlesbridge since at least 1372. A new bridge was erected in 1845, but collapsed when a steam traction engine attempted to cross it. A replacement bridge was erected around 1872, at a cost of £3,500, and was sufficient for all traffic for over 100 years, until it was widened to accommodate two lanes of traffic. This is the third bridge, but the road it carries was declassified when the bypass bridge opened.

On the upstream side of the final bridge is a dam constructed across the river, which was part of the tide mill situated on the south bank of the river. The present mill building dates from the late 18th century, and is built of bricks with a red tiled roof. There is an opening in the dam, containing a pair of V-gates, which allowed the incoming tide to pass through them, but as the tide fell, the gates closed, and the impounded water was used to drive a water wheel. The building is now used as a warehouse and offices. Just upstream of it is a former granary and drying kiln, built of red brick and dating from the early 19th century. It was associated with the tide mill, but has since been converted into a house. Battlesbridge now contains a number of antique shops.

=== The navigable river ===
The river is navigable from below the bridge for 17.5 miles (28.2 km) to the sea. The upper reaches are quite narrow and wind between sandbanks. There are high sea walls on both sides of the channel. The river flows through Long Reach, after which it reaches Hullbridge on the south bank. A little further back from the river on the north bank is South Woodham Ferrers. Its western boundary is defined by Fenn Creek, which begins as a stream called Rettendon Brook rising near Hanningfield Reservoir and is tidal below the point where it is crossed by the A132 road. There are footpaths along both river banks at this location, with Marsh Farm Country Park situated between South Woodham Ferrers and the river. On the south bank is the hamlet of Brandy Hole, and the river flows through stretches called Brandy Hole and Brandy Hole Reach. Clementsgreen Creek then forms the eastern boundary of South Woodham Ferrers, and there is a network of tidal creeks on the south bank. On the north bank, Stow Creek provides access to Fambridge Yacht Haven, after which the river passes between the villages of North Fambridge and South Fambridge.

The next sections are called Shortpole Reach, Raypole Reach and Easter Reach. The Roach Valley Way, a 23-mile (37 km) long distance footpath joins the south bank, while on the north bank, Bridgemarsh Creek and Althorne Creek separate Bridgemarsh Island from the mainland. Bridgemarsh Island was protected by a sea wall built in 1736, and could be reached from Althorne by a causeway which was accessible at low tide. Clay on the island was used to make bricks, and there was a tramway to transport the bricks to Thames barges for onward distribution. However, the sea wall was breached by the North Sea flood of 1953 and the island was abandoned to wildlife. It is now owned by the Wildlife Habitat Trust. Boats with a draught of less than 3.5 feet (1.1 m) can with care navigate right round the island along Althorne Creek and Bridgemarsh Creek at spring tides. The island is about 2.5 miles (4 km) long.

Passing along Cliff Reach, the river arrives at Creeksea and Burnham-on-Crouch on the north bank, where Burnham Yacht Harbour provides facilities for visiting boats. The grade II* listed clubhouse for the Royal Corinthian Yacht Club was designed by the architect Joseph Emberton in 1930, and was awarded a bronze medal and diploma by the Royal Institute of British Architects. The town has hosted the Burnham Week Regatta since 1893, with organisation shared between the Royal Corinthian Yacht Club, the Royal Burnham Yacht Club and the Crouch Yacht Club. Boaters benefit from the Burnham inshore lifeboat run by the Royal National Lifeboat Institution, which is housed in a floating boathouse within the yacht harbour. On the opposite bank is Baltic Wharf and Essex Marina, at the western end of Wallasea Island. Baltic Wharf is a commercial port, where timber and steel are imported, some of it from Riga in Latvia, with two vessels regularly plying that route. The port can accommodate vessels up to 390 feet (120 m) long with a draught of 21 feet (6.5 m), and all vessels over 160 feet (50 m) must use the services of a pilot while moving on the river. A passenger ferry operates between Essex Marina and Burnham town quay every day except Wednesdays during the summer months. The crossing takes about ten minutes, and the boat operates when requested.

Wallasea Island was created from five smaller islands by building sea defences, and was largely used for grazing sheep until the 1930s, when it was drained to provide arable land. In 2006, the Department for Environment, Food and Rural Affairs (DEFRA) created 284 acres (115 ha) of new saltmarsh and intertidal mud flats. Since 2008, a project managed by the Royal Society for the Protection of Birds (RSPB) to transform more of the island back to intertidal coastal marshland has been ongoing, helped by spoil from the excavation of tunnels for the Crossrail project, which has been used to raise the level of parts of the island. Breaches were then made in the sea walls, to create some 1,500 acres (610 ha) of intertidal habitat. In order to deliver over 3 million tonnes of earth, Crossrail built a temporary jetty in the river, where ships arrived between August 2012 and March 2015, and the sea walls were breached on 11 July 2015. The original plans involved a further 8 million tonnes of soil, but the RSPB were unable to source this, and so a revised scheme was implemented, where sea water was admitted to shallow lagoons through an existing sluice in the sea wall. The river continues eastwards, and is joined by the River Roach at the eastern end of Wallsea Island. It flows into the North Sea between Holliwell Point (grid reference TR026963) and Foulness Point (TR048954) on its north and south banks respectively. High water at Burnham is one hour and ten minutes later than high water at Dover, with a tidal range of 16 feet (5 m) at spring tides and 10 feet (3.2 m) at neap tides. Approaching the river from the North Sea requires care, as the Whitaker Channel and Ray Sand Channel are separated by a large sandbank known as Buxey Sand, and to the south of the Whitaker Channel, the Foulness Sands are a danger area, used as a military firing range.

== History ==
There was a proposal in 1825 to extend navigation onwards from Battlesbridge to Purfleet with a branch to Billericay. The route to Billericay would have been around 7.5 miles (12.1 km) long, and 29 locks were proposed, in order to negotiate the difference in height of 181 feet (55 m). Because the river is still tidal at Battlesbridge, a sea lock would have provided access from the river, with five locks soon afterwards. A further seven locks would have been constructed along the route, with a flight of 16 locks to raise the canal by 100 feet (30 m) in the final 1.25 miles (2.0 km). The engineer Alexander Clark prepared the proposal, with help from surveyors J & H Clayton. The statutory documents were submitted to Essex County Council on 30 November 1825, but the amount of trade likely to use the canal could never have justified the expense of so many locks, and no more was heard of the scheme.

=== Milling ===
The Crouch runs through a relatively flat landscape and is therefore not ideal for powering water mills. Nevertheless, there are at least five sites where mills are known to have existed, based on documentary records. The furthest upstream was at Great Burstead, possibly near to Noak Bridge, where a mill was recorded in 1593. It was said to be near Kemps Brook, and the miller at the time was John Crouch. A mill was also recorded at Ramsden Bellhouse in 1086 as part of the Domesday survey.

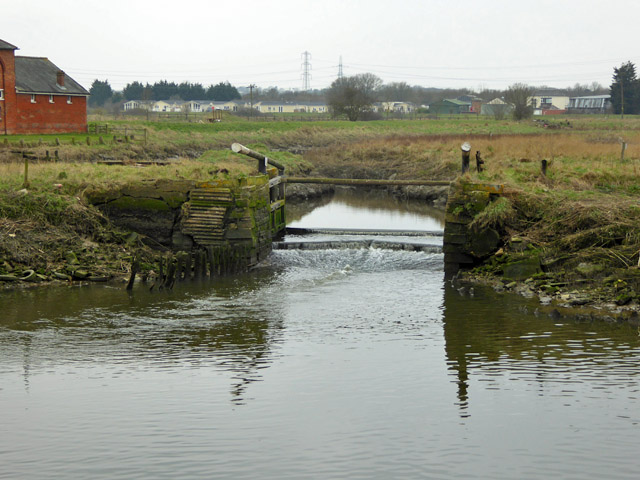
The tide gates which impounded water above them to power Battlesbridge tide mill

The most significant of the mills was a tide mill at Battlesbridge. Local people from the parish of Rettendon petitioned the Lord of the Manor, Thomas Fitch of Danbury, for permission to build a mill on the north bank of the river in 1765. When it was built, the mill was situated on the south bank, and was therefore in the parish of Rawreth, where the Lord of the Manor was St John College, Cambridge. They issued a licence to Edward Bilding of Moulsham on 3 March 1766. Some negotiation was required with Thomas Finch, in order to place stakes, piles and boards on the north bank of the river, for which £5 had to be paid four times a year. The land on which the building stood was bought from the college, while the mill was complete by February 1767, and possibly earlier. It had four storeys and was powered by two water wheels, driving four pairs of French stones. There was also a house for the miller and an outhouse. The mill was sold in 1837 after John Deely the miller became bankrupt. For the sale, it was described as a tide mill with a house, a stabbling coach house and a granary together with an extensive coal wharf and brick yard with dry kilns. Impounded water from the tides drove a breastshot wheel which was 18 feet (5.5 m) in diameter and 10 feet (3.0 m) wide. Lighters could enter the mill leat through a set of gates at every tide. There was a granary below the bridge, which could be accessed more easily, without the need for boats to lower their masts. Some time after 1877, a second mill was built below the bridge, and a leat was partially constructed from the old mill to the new, but power was provided by oil engines. Despite this, records stated that water and steam power were in use in 1886 and 1926. The owner of the mill restored the tide gates in 1989 and used a new water wheel to drive an electrical generator.

There was also a tide mill at the head of Stow Creek in the 16th and 17th centuries. A number of millers were recorded during this period, and the miller was responsible for maintenance of a stile in the churchyard in 1682. This is the last known reference to millers at Stow Maries. A mill at Burnham was also mentioned in 1086, and as it was said to be in salt water, it may also have been a tide mill.

== The River Crouch Conservation Trust ==
The River Crouch Conservation Trust was set up in July 2009 by a group of concerned local people, mainly fisherman, after a stretch of the river around Memorial Park, Wickford was badly polluted. Its aim is to clear the river of rubbish and to bring the river back to a quality which will benefit all forms of wildlife, from water voles, fish to invertebrates and for the benefit of the public.

== The Crouch Harbour Authority ==
The Crouch Harbour Authority is the statutory harbour and navigation authority for the Rivers Crouch and Roach, extending some distance into the Thames Estuary, and controls both pleasure and commercial use of the rivers. The authority, created via the Crouch Harbour Act 1974, is run not-for profit and funded by dues levied on vessels kept on the river. Its tasks include passing and enforcing bylaws that regulate use of the river, providing pilotage and buoying/marking the navigable channels. They also provide weather forecasts, tide tables and other important sailing information. The Harbourmaster's Office is on the Quay at Burnham on Crouch.

== Water quality ==
The Environment Agency measure the water quality of the river systems in England. Each is given an overall ecological status, which may be one of five levels: high, good, moderate, poor and bad. There are several components that are used to determine this, including biological status, which looks at the quantity and varieties of invertebrates, angiosperms and fish. Chemical status, which compares the concentrations of various chemicals against known safe concentrations, is rated good or fail. Parts of the Crouch are designated as "heavily modified", which means that the channels have been altered by human activity, and the criteria for this designation are defined by the Water Framework Directive.

The water quality of the River Crouch was as follows in 2019.

Section	Ecological Status	Chemical Status	Length	Catchment	Channel
Crouch (Upper) - u/s A129	Moderate	Fail	3.5 miles (5.6 km)	6.57 square miles (17.0 km^{2})	
Crouch (A129 - Wickford)	Moderate	Fail	4.0 miles (6.4 km)	19.74 square miles (51.1 km^{2})	
Crouch (d/s Wickford)	Moderate	Fail	1.7 miles (2.7 km)	3.69 square miles (9.6 km^{2})	heavily modified
Crouch	Moderate	Fail			heavily modified

Reasons for the water quality being less than good include runoff from agricultural land, runoff from the transport infrastructure, and discharge from sewage treatment works. Like many rivers in the UK, the chemical status changed from good to fail in 2019, due to the presence of polybrominated diphenyl ethers (PBDE) and mercury compounds, neither of which had previously been included in the assessment.

== Gallery ==
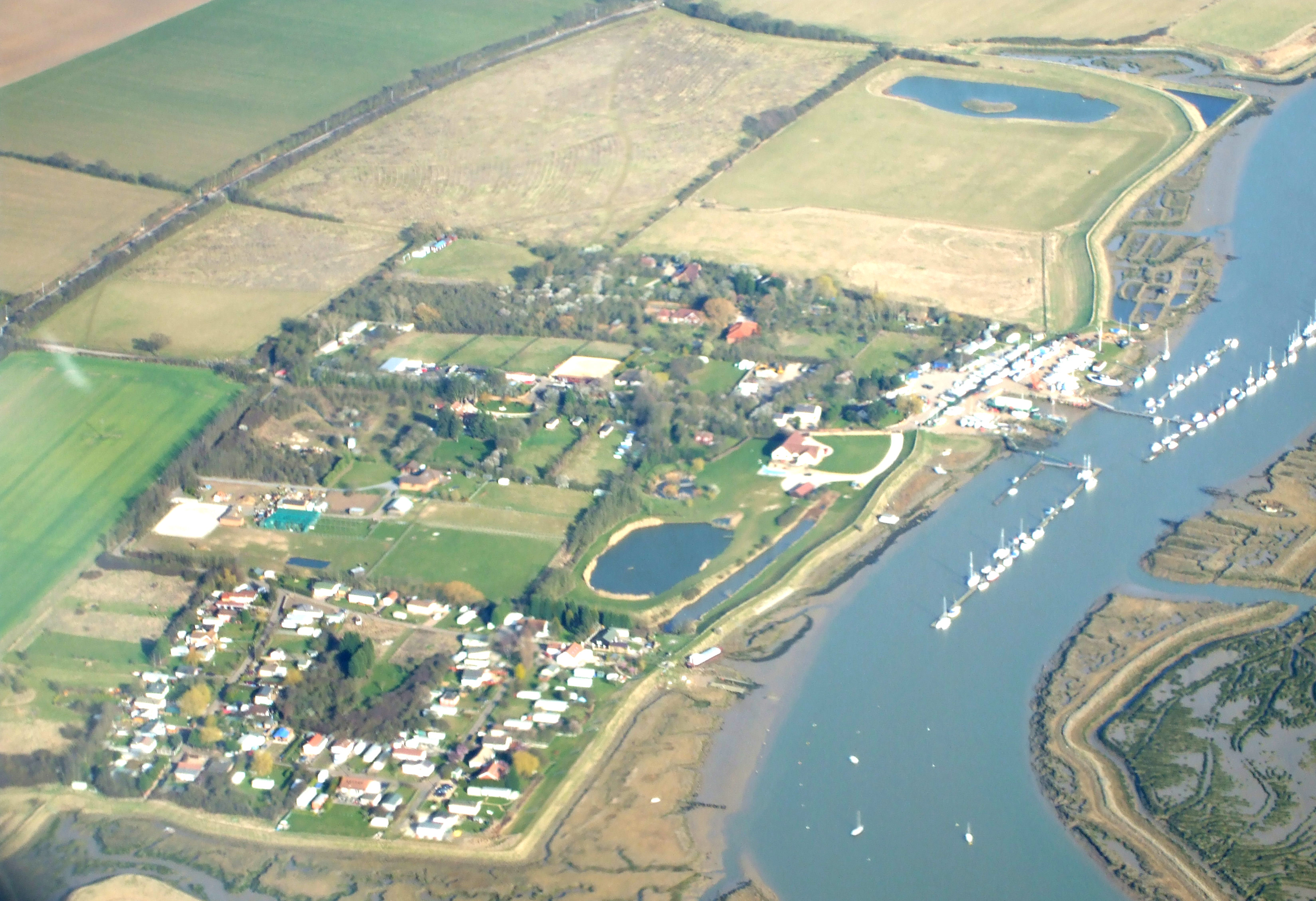
Althorne Marina.

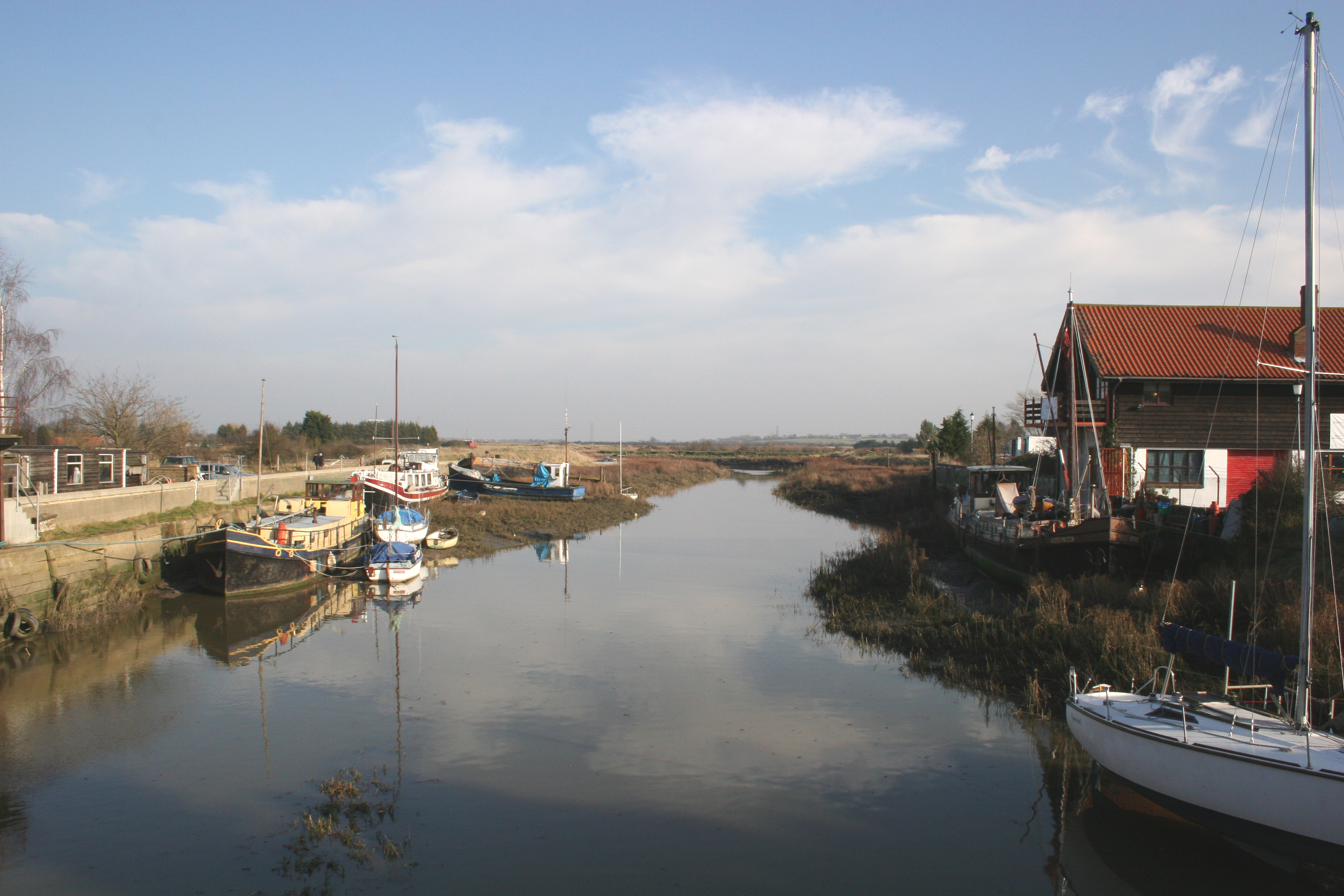
End of the Navigable Crouch at Battlesbridge

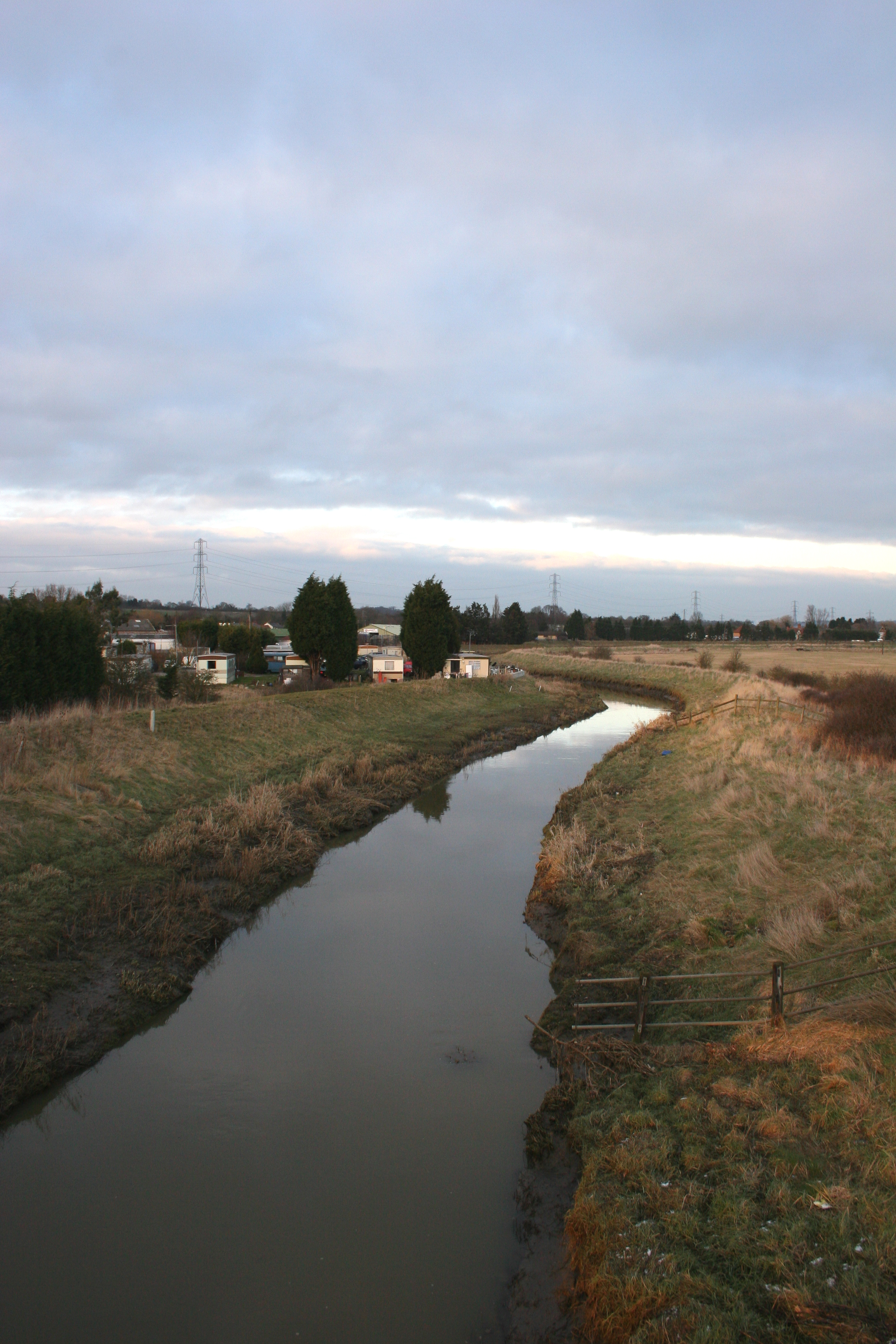
River Crouch South West of Battlesbridge.Taken from the Bridge on the A1245 (TQ775942).

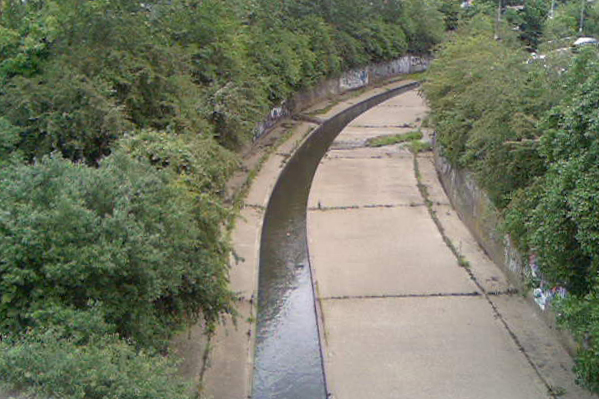
River Crouch, Wickford. Narrow but quite deep!

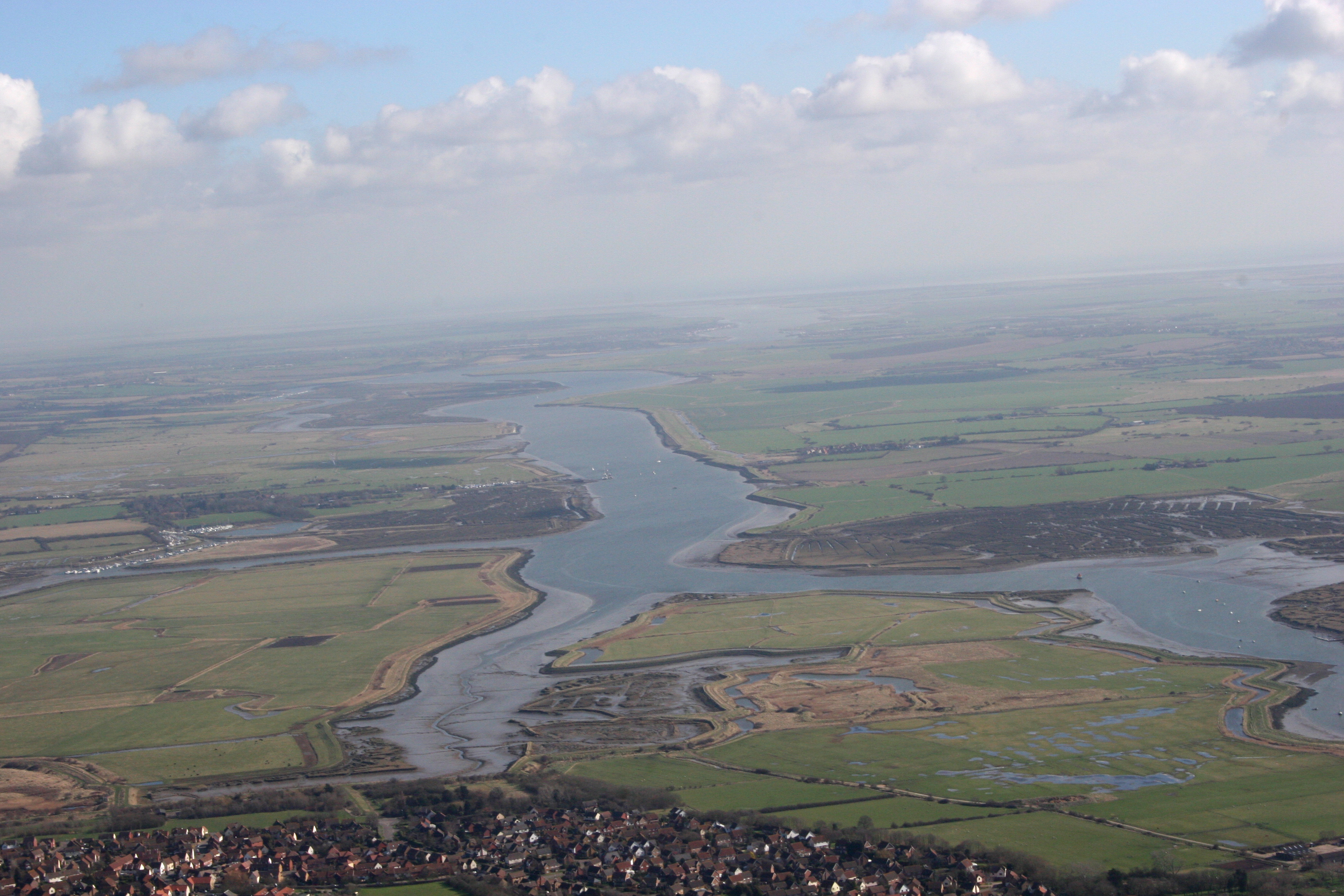
River Crouch, photo taken over South Woodham Ferrers

== See also ==
- Bridgemarsh Island
- Wallasea Island
- Foulness Island
