= Basildon Borough Council elections =

Local government elections in Essex, England

One third of Basildon Borough Council in Essex, England is elected each year, followed by one year without election. Since the last boundary changes in 2002, 42 councillors have been elected from 16 wards.

== Council elections ==
Composition of the council
| Year | Conservative | Labour | Liberal Democrats (Note: Includes totals for the predecessors of the Liberal Democrats, the Liberal Party and SDP (both of which participated in the Alliance).) | Reform | UKIP | Wickford Ind. | Independents & Others | Council control after election |
|---|---|---|---|---|---|---|---|---|
Local government reorganisation; council established (46 seats)
| 1973 | 9 | 31 | 0 | – | – | – | 6 | Labour |
| 1976 | 17 | 23 | 0 | – | – | – | 6 | No overall control |
New ward boundaries (42 seats)
| 1979 | 16 | 17 | 0 | – | – | – | 9 | No overall control |
| 1980 | 13 | 20 | 0 | – | – | – | 9 | No overall control |
| 1982 | 10 | 22 | 3 | – | – | – | 4 | Labour |
| 1983 | 13 | 24 | 3 | – | – | – | 2 | Labour |
| 1984 | 15 | 24 | 3 | – | – | – | 0 | Labour |
| 1986 | 13 | 22 | 7 | – | – | – | 0 | Labour |
| 1987 | 11 | 20 | 11 | – | – | – | 0 | No overall control |
| 1988 | 13 | 20 | 9 | – | – | – | 0 | No overall control |
| 1990 | 14 | 23 | 5 | – | – | – | 0 | Labour |
| 1976 | 17 | 21 | 4 | – | – | – | 0 | No overall control |
| 1992 | 26 | 13 | 3 | – | – | – | 0 | Conservative |
| 1994 | 19 | 13 | 8 | – | 0 | – | 2 | No overall control |
| 1995 | 14 | 16 | 12 | – | 0 | – | 0 | No overall control |
| 1996 | 1 | 24 | 17 | – | 0 | – | 0 | Labour |
| 1998 | 6 | 23 | 13 | – | 0 | – | 0 | Labour |
| 1999 | 11 | 23 | 8 | – | 0 | – | 0 | Labour |
| 2000 | 18 | 20 | 4 | – | 0 | – | 0 | No overall control |
New ward boundaries (42 seats)
| 2002 | 21 | 18 | 3 | – | 0 | – | 0 | No overall control |
| 2003 | 23 | 14 | 3 | – | 0 | – | 2 | Conservative |
| 2004 | 24 | 15 | 3 | – | 0 | – | 0 | Conservative |
| 2006 | 27 | 12 | 3 | – | 0 | – | 0 | Conservative |
| 2007 | 28 | 11 | 3 | – | 0 | – | 0 | Conservative |
| 2008 | 29 | 10 | 3 | – | 0 | – | 0 | Conservative |
| 2010 | 29 | 10 | 3 | – | 0 | – | 0 | Conservative |
| 2011 | 29 | 11 | 2 | – | 0 | – | 0 | Conservative |
| 2012 | 26 | 14 | 2 | – | 0 | – | 0 | Conservative |
| 2014 | 17 | 10 | 1 | – | 12 | – | 2 | No overall control |
| 2015 | 18 | 9 | 1 | – | 11 | – | 2 | No overall control |
| 2016 | 18 | 9 | 0 | – | 10 | 3 | 2 | No overall control |
| 2018 | 23 | 12 | 0 | – | 5 | 0 | 2 | Conservative |
| 2019 | 20 | 15 | 0 | – | 1 | 2 | 4 | No overall control |
| 2021 | 22 | 12 | 0 | 0 | 0 | 2 | 6 | Conservative |
| 2022 | 22 | 10 | 0 | 0 | 0 | 2 | 7 | Conservative |
| 2023 | 26 | 10 | 0 | 0 | 0 | 1 | 5 | Conservative |
New ward boundaries (42 seats)
| 2024 | 13 | 18 | 0 | 0 | 0 | 5 | 6 | No overall control |
| 2026 | 12 | 12 | 0 | 11 | 0 | 3 | 4 | No overall control |

== Borough result maps ==
1979 results map

1980 results map

1982 results map

1983 results map

1984 results map

1986 results map

1987 results map

1988 results map

1990 results map

1991 results map

1992 results map

1994 results map

1995 results map

1996 results map

1998 results map

1999 results map

2000 results map

2002 results map

2003 results map

2004 results map

2006 results map

2007 results map

2008 results map

2010 results map

2011 results map

2012 results map

2014 results map

2015 results map

2016 results map

2018 results map

2019 results map

2021 results map

2022 results map

2023 results map

2024 results map

2026 results map

== By-election results ==
=== 1998–2002 ===
Vange By-Election 23 July 1998
| Party | Candidate | Votes | % | ±% |
|---|---|---|---|---|
| Labour | | 766 | 57.2 | −8.0 |
| Conservative | | 507 | 37.9 | +12.9 |
| Liberal Democrats | | 65 | 4.9 | −4.9 |
| Majority | | 259 | 19.3 | |
| Turnout | | 1,338 | | |
| Labour hold | | Swing | | |

Pitsea West By-Election 7 June 2001
| Party | Candidate | Votes | % | ±% |
|---|---|---|---|---|
| Labour | | 2,229 | 55.0 | +9.0 |
| Conservative | | 1,180 | 29.6 | −12.8 |
| Liberal Democrats | | 475 | 11.9 | +11.9 |
| Independent | | 52 | 1.3 | +1.3 |
| Socialist Alliance | | 51 | 1.3 | +1.3 |
| Majority | | 1,049 | 25.4 | |
| Turnout | | 3,987 | | |
| Labour hold | | Swing | | |

Lee Chapel North By-Election 23 August 2001
| Party | Candidate | Votes | % | ±% |
|---|---|---|---|---|
| Labour | Richard Rackham | 930 | 59.4 | +14.1 |
| Conservative | Michael Dickinson | 524 | 33.5 | −1.4 |
| Liberal Democrats | | 64 | 4.1 | −5.3 |
| Socialist Alliance | | 34 | 2.2 | +2.2 |
| Independent | | 13 | 0.8 | −6.0 |
| Majority | | 406 | 25.9 | |
| Turnout | | 1,565 | 21.0 | |
| Labour hold | | Swing | | |

Billericay West By-Election 4 October 2001
| Party | Candidate | Votes | % | ±% |
|---|---|---|---|---|
| Conservative | | 1,344 | 75.5 | +8.8 |
| Liberal Democrats | | 363 | 20.4 | −6.0 |
| Labour | | 72 | 4.0 | −2.9 |
| Majority | | 981 | 55.1 | |
| Turnout | | 1,779 | 16.8 | |
| Conservative gain from Liberal Democrats | | Swing | | |

=== 2002-2006 ===
Laindon Park By-Election 23 September 2004
| Party | Candidate | Votes | % | ±% |
|---|---|---|---|---|
| Labour | Allan Davies | 818 | 42.3 | +14.0 |
| Conservative | Harry Tucker | 582 | 30.1 | −4.8 |
| BNP | David King | 365 | 18.9 | −1.3 |
| Liberal Democrats | Fane Cummings | 139 | 7.2 | −3.6 |
| Independent | Alfred Viccary | 30 | 1.6 | −4.2 |
| Majority | | 236 | 12.2 | |
| Turnout | | 1,934 | 22.9 | |
| Labour gain from Conservative | | Swing | | |

=== 2010-2014 ===
Nethermayne By-Election 23 July 2010
| Party | Candidate | Votes | % | ±% |
|---|---|---|---|---|
| Liberal Democrats | Phillip Jenkins | 605 | 33.5 | −2.9 |
| Labour | David Kirkman | 461 | 25.5 | +1.9 |
| Conservative | Stephen Foster | 372 | 20.6 | −10.6 |
| UKIP | Kerry Smith | 280 | 15.5 | +15.5 |
| BNP | Irene Bateman | 70 | 3.9 | −4.9 |
| Independent | Jason Richardson | 18 | 1.0 | +1.0 |
| Majority | | 144 | 8.0 | |
| Turnout | | 1,806 | 20.4 | |
| Liberal Democrats hold | | Swing | | |

Wickford Castleton By-Election, 2 May 2013
| Party | Candidate | Votes | % | ±% |
|---|---|---|---|---|
| UKIP | Nigel De Lecq Le Gresley | 637 | 36.2 | N/A |
| Conservative | Jennie Jackman | 589 | 33.5 | ▼48.1 |
| Independent | Alan Ronald Ball | 288 | 16.40 | N/A |
| Labour | Albert Edward Ede | 179 | 10.1 | ▼16.3 |
| Liberal Democrats | Philip Edward Jenkins | 32 | 1.82 | ▼13.4 |
| BNP | Philip David Howell | 24 | 1.3 | N/A |
| National Front | Thomas Frank Beaney | 7 | 0.3 | N/A |
| Majority | | 48 | | |
| Turnout | | 1,756 | 27.7 | −11.1 |
| UKIP gain from Conservative | | Swing | | |

Billericay East by-election, 27 June 2013
| Party | Candidate | Votes | % | ±% |
|---|---|---|---|---|
| Conservative | Andrew Schrader | 790 | 50.8 | −6.7 |
| UKIP | Terry Gandy | 464 | 29.8 | +14.1 |
| Labour | Lauren Brown | 170 | 10.9 | −3.8 |
| Liberal Democrats | Nigel Horn | 128 | 8.2 | −3.9 |
| National Front | Thomas Beaney | 3 | 0.2 | N/A |
| Majority | | 326 | 21.0 | |
| Turnout | | 1,564 | 16.7 | |
| Conservative hold | | Swing | | |

=== 2018-2022 ===
Lee Chapel North by-election, 21 June 2018
| Party | Candidate | Votes | % | ±% |
|---|---|---|---|---|
| Labour | Kayode Adeniran | 612 | 57.4 | +1.7 |
| Conservative | Spencer Warner | 267 | 25.0 | −1.5 |
| UKIP | Frank Ferguson | 145 | 13.6 | −4.1 |
| BNP | Christine Winter | 42 | 3.9 | +3.9 |
| Majority | | 345 | 32.4 | |
| Turnout | | 1,066 | | |
| Labour hold | | Swing | | |

Pitsea South East by-election, 21 June 2018
| Party | Candidate | Votes | % | ±% |
|---|---|---|---|---|
| Labour | Andrew Ansell | 718 | 46.1 | +6.7 |
| Conservative | Yetunde Adeshile | 710 | 45.6 | +0.0 |
| UKIP | Richard Morris | 130 | 8.3 | −2.8 |
| Majority | | 8 | 0.5 | |
| Turnout | | 1,558 | | |
| Labour gain from UKIP | | Swing | | |

Vange by-election, 19 March 2019
| Party | Candidate | Votes | % | ±% |
|---|---|---|---|---|
| Labour | Aidan McGurran | 504 | 51.3 | +10.1 |
| Conservative | Yetunde Adeshile | 478 | 48.7 | +27.2 |
| Majority | | 26 | 2.6 | |
| Turnout | | 982 | | |
| Labour hold | | Swing | | |

Pitsea North West by-election, 29 July 2021
| Party | Candidate | Votes | % | ±% |
|---|---|---|---|---|
| Conservative | Stuart Terson | 794 | 56.5 | |
| Labour | Aidan McGurran | 430 | 30.6 | |
| Basildon Community Residents Party | Jake Hogg | 82 | 5.8 | |
| Liberal Democrats | Martin Howard | 57 | 4.1 | |
| Reform | Daniel Tooley | 23 | 1.6 | |
| For Britain | Christopher Bateman | 19 | 1.4 | |
| Majority | | 364 | 25.9 | |
| Turnout | | 1,405 | | |
| Conservative gain from Labour | | Swing | | |

Lee Chapel North by-election, 25 November 2021
| Party | Candidate | Votes | % | ±% |
|---|---|---|---|---|
| Labour | Terry Webb | 451 | 39.8 | |
| Conservative | Deepak Shukla | 395 | 34.8 | |
| Basildon Community Residents Party | Kay Quested | 135 | 11.9 | |
| Reform | Frank Ferguson | 98 | 8.6 | |
| Liberal Democrats | Michael Chandler | 55 | 4.9 | |
| Majority | | 56 | 4.9 | |
| Turnout | | 1,134 | | |
| Labour hold | | Swing | | |

=== 2022-2026 ===
Nethermayne by-election, 20 July 2022
| Party | Candidate | Votes | % | ±% |
|---|---|---|---|---|
| Independent | Mo Larkin | 909 | 62.7 | +62.7 |
| Conservative | Mark Cottrell | 233 | 16.1 | +4.1 |
| Labour | Dylan Wright | 169 | 11.7 | −2.7 |
| Liberal Democrats | Stephen Nice | 102 | 7.0 | +3.2 |
| Reform | Michael Kinnane | 37 | 2.6 | +2.6 |
| Majority | | 676 | 46.6 | |
| Turnout | | 1,450 | | |
| Independent hold | | Swing | | |

Wickford Park by-election, 26 June 2025
| Party | Candidate | Votes | % | ±% |
|---|---|---|---|---|
| Reform | Sarah-Jane Shields | 922 | 40.6 | |
| Conservative | Lewis Hooper | 840 | 37.0 | |
| Liberal Democrats | Stewart Mott | 171 | 7.5 | |
| Wickford Ind. | Andrew Carter | 148 | 6.5 | |
| Labour | Wayne Milne | 146 | 6.4 | |
| Green | Penny Wright | 43 | 1.9 | |
| Majority | | 82 | 3.6 | |
| Turnout | | 2,270 | | |
| Reform gain from Wickford Ind. | | Swing | | |

St Martin's by-election, 17 July 2025
| Party | Candidate | Votes | % | ±% |
|---|---|---|---|---|
| Reform | Sam Journet | 1,057 | 44.6 | |
| Labour | Elizabeth Atkinson | 833 | 35.1 | |
| Conservative | Deepak Roy | 320 | 13.5 | |
| Green | Ellie Matthewman | 82 | 3.5 | |
| Liberal Democrats | Michael Chandler | 39 | 1.6 | |
| TUSC | Andrew Buxton | 26 | 1.1 | |
| SDP | Simon Breedon | 13 | 0.5 | |
| Majority | | 224 | 9.5 | |
| Turnout | | 2,370 | | |
| Reform gain from Labour | | Swing | | |
