= 2019 Basildon Borough Council election =

Basildon Borough Council election of 2019

← 2018	2 May 2019	2021 →

14 of the 42 seats to Basildon Borough Council 22 seats needed for a majority
	First party	Second party	Third party
Party	Conservative	Labour	Independent
Seats before	23	13	3
Seats won	5	6	3
Seats after	20	15	6
Seat change	▼3	▲2	▲3
	Fourth party
Party	UKIP
Seats before	3
Seats won	0
Seats after	1
Seat change	▼2
- Map showing the results of contested wards in the 2019 Basildon Borough Council elections.
Council control before election
Conservative
Council control after election
No overall control

The 2019 Basildon Borough Council election took place on 2 May 2019 to elect members of Basildon Borough Council in Essex. This was on the same day as other local elections. The Conservative Party lost control of the council. which fell under no overall control.

After the election, the composition of the council was

- Conservative 20
- Labour 15
- Independent 6
- UKIP 1

== Results summary ==
2019 Basildon Borough Council election
Party	This election			Full council			This election		
Party	Seats	Net	Seats %	Other	Total	Total %	Votes	Votes %	+/−
Conservative	5	▼3	35.7	15	20	47.6	13,356	43.1	▲6.2
Labour	6	▲2	42.9	9	15	35.7	7,567	24.4	▼3.1
Independent	1	▲1	7.1	3	4	9.5	3,313	10.7	▲6.2
Wickford Ind.	2	▲2	14.3	0	2	4.8	3,261	10.5	New
UKIP	0	▼2	0.0	1	1	2.4	0	0.0	▼27.8
Liberal Democrats	0	Steady	0.0	0	0	0.0	2,900	9.4	▲6.9
Green	0	Steady	0.0	0	0	0.0	589	1.9	▲1.5

All comparisons in vote share are to the corresponding 2016 election.

== Ward results ==
An asterisk denotes an incumbent councillor seeking re-election.

=== Billericay East ===
Location of Billericay East ward

Billericay East
Party	Candidate	Votes	%
Conservative	David John Dadds*	1,881	64.1
Green	Sarah Anne Read	589	20.1
Liberal Democrats	Karen Taurina Joy Manterfield	236	8.0
Labour	Gillian Mary Palmer	230	7.8
Majority		1,292	44.0
Turnout		2,936	32
Conservative hold			

=== Billericay West ===
Location of Billericay West ward

Billericay West
Party	Candidate	Votes	%
Conservative	Daniel Lawrence*	1,692	52.5
Liberal Democrats	Edward Krishan Sainsbury	1,270	39.4
Labour	Tracey Jane Hilton	260	8.1
Majority		422	13.1
Turnout		3,222	35
Conservative hold			

=== Burstead ===
Location of Burstead ward

Burstead
Party	Candidate	Votes	%
Conservative	Kevin Blake*	2,278	82.9
Labour	Andrew Charles Buxton	471	17.1
Majority		1,807	65.7
Turnout		2,749	33
Conservative hold			

=== Fryerns ===
Location of Fryerns ward

Fryerns
Party	Candidate	Votes	%
Labour	Allan Robert Davies*	1,021	55.3
Conservative	Perry John Ian Taylor	552	29.9
Liberal Democrats	Vivien Jennifer Howard	274	14.8
Majority		469	25.4
Turnout		1,847	19
Labour hold			

=== Laindon Park ===
Location of Laindon Park ward

Laindon Park
Party	Candidate	Votes	%
Labour	John Peter Richard Scarola	810	35.5
Conservative	Christopher Jason Lee Allen	754	33.1
Independent	Tony Low	717	31.4
Majority		56	2.5
Turnout		2,281	23
Labour gain from Conservative			

=== Lee Chapel North ===
Location of Lee Chapel North ward

Lee Chapel North
Party	Candidate	Votes	%
Labour	Kayode Adeniran	870	52.6
Conservative	Yetunde Juliet Oyebola Adeshile	437	26.4
Liberal Democrats	Michael Chandler	348	21.0
Majority		433	26.2
Turnout		1,655	17
Labour hold			

=== Nethermayne ===
Location of Nethermayne ward

Nethermayne
Party	Candidate	Votes	%
Independent	Pauline Patricia Kettle	2,149	73.0
Labour	David John Goddard	349	11.9
Conservative	Sandeep Singh Sandhu	210	7.1
Independent	Stephen Michael Hodge*	138	4.7
Liberal Democrats	Stephen William Nice	96	3.3
Majority		1,800	61.2
Turnout		2,942	30
Independent gain from UKIP			

=== Pitsea North West ===
Location of Pitsea North West ward

Pitsea North West
Party	Candidate	Votes	%
Labour	Patricia Reid	885	48.4
Conservative	Gary Canham	696	38.1
Liberal Democrats	Martin Keith Howard	246	13.5
Majority		189	10.3
Turnout		1,827	20
Labour gain from UKIP			

=== Pitsea South East ===
Location of Pitsea South East ward

Pitsea South East
Party	Candidate	Votes	%
Conservative	Craig Ronald Rimmer	1,190	52.0
Labour	Alexander James Harrison	900	39.3
Liberal Democrats	Clare Louise Nice	199	8.7
Majority		290	12.7
Turnout		2,289	26
Conservative hold			

=== St Martin's ===
Location of St Martin's ward

St Martin's
Party	Candidate	Votes	%
Labour	Maryam Yaqub	611	47.4
Conservative	Sandra Elizabeth Hillier	448	34.7
Liberal Democrats	Philip Edward Jenkins	231	17.9
Majority		163	12.6
Turnout		1,290	21
Labour hold			

=== Vange ===
Location of Vange ward

Vange
Party	Candidate	Votes	%
Labour	Melissa Anne McGeorge*	575	43.8
Conservative	Mark Richard Biddle	428	32.6
Independent	Simon John Breedon	309	23.6
Majority		147	11.2
Turnout		1,312	19
Labour hold			

=== Wickford Castledon ===
Location of Wickford Castleton ward

Wickford Castledon
Party	Candidate	Votes	%
Conservative	Don Morris*	1,060	54.0
Wickford Ind.	Alan Ronald Ball	665	33.9
Labour	Louise Rachel Catling	238	12.1
Majority		395	20.1
Turnout		1,963	31
Conservative hold			

=== Wickford North ===
Location of Wickford North ward

Wickford North
Party	Candidate	Votes	%
Wickford Ind.	Eunice Christine Brockman	1,247	44.9
Conservative	Michael Owen Mowe*	1,182	42.6
Labour	Peter James Towler	347	12.5
Majority		65	2.3
Turnout		2,776	27
Wickford Ind. gain from Conservative			

=== Wickford Park ===
Location of Wickford Park ward

Wickford Park
Party	Candidate	Votes	%
Wickford Ind.	David Harrison	1,349	71.1
Conservative	Stephanie Lucinda Hedley-Barnes	548	28.9
Majority		801	42.2
Turnout		1,897	27
Wickford Ind. gain from Conservative			
