= 2015 Basildon Borough Council election =

2015 UK local government election

← 2014	7 May 2015	2016 →

14 of the 42 seats to Basildon Borough Council 23 seats needed for a majority
	First party	Second party	Third party
Party	Conservative	UKIP	Labour
Last election	17	12	9
Seats before	17	10	9
Seats won	8	2	4
Seats after	18	11	9
Seat change	▲1	▲1	▼2
Popular vote	31,401	20,987	17,721
Percentage	42.6%	28.4%	24.0%
	Fourth party	Fifth party
Party	Independent	Liberal Democrats
Last election	0	1
Seats before	2	1
Seats won	0	0
Seats after	2	1
Seat change	Steady	Steady
Popular vote	312	3,281
Percentage	0.4%	4.5%
- Map showing the results of contested wards in the 2015 Basildon Borough Council elections.
Council control before election
No overall control
Council control after election
No overall control

The 2015 Basildon Borough Council election took place on 7 May 2015, as part of the 2015 United Kingdom local elections, and took place alongside the UK General Election. One third of seats were up for election, with these seats last being contested in 2011. As a result of the election, the council remained in no overall control. The Conservative Party remained as the largest party, and formed a minority administration.

== Results summary ==
2015 Basildon Borough Council Election
Party	Seats	Gains	Losses	Net gain/loss	Seats %	Votes %	Votes	+/−
Conservative	8	1	0	▲1	57.1	42.6	31,401	▼3.4
Labour	4	0	2	▼2	28.6	24.0	17,721	▼8.1
UKIP	2	2	1	▲1	14.3	28.4	20,987	▲20.2
Liberal Democrats	0	0	0	Steady	0.0	4.5	3,281	▼4.4
Independent	0	0	0	Steady	0.0	0.4	312	▼2.8
TUSC	0	0	0	Steady	0.0	0.1	97	New

The turnout was 62.9%, and there were 376 ballots rejected. All comparisons in vote share are to the corresponding 2011 election.

== Council composition ==
Following the 2014 election, the composition of the council was:

↓
17	12	9	3	1
Conservative	UKIP	Labour	IND	L

On the eve of the 2015 election, the composition of the council was:

↓
17	10	9	3	2	1
Conservative	UKIP	Labour	IND	IG	L

After the election, the composition of the council was:

↓
18	11	9	2	1
Conservative	UKIP	Labour	IG	L

IND - Independent
IG - Independence Group
L - Liberal Democrats

== Ward results ==
An asterisk denotes an incumbent councillor seeking re-election.

=== Billericay East ===
Location of Billericay East ward

Billericay East
Party	Candidate	Votes	%	±%
Conservative	David John Dadds*	4,085	60.6	−4.0
UKIP	Herbert John Webb	1,076	16.0	+7.5
Labour	Patricia Reid	878	13.0	−0.9
Liberal Democrats	Nigel John Horn	704	10.4	−2.6
Majority		3,009	44.6	
Turnout		6,743	74.0	+29.8
Conservative hold		Swing		

=== Billericay West ===
Location of Billericay West ward

Billericay West
Party	Candidate	Votes	%	±%
Conservative	Daniel Lawrence	4,419	64.2	+4.9
UKIP	Susan Patricia McCaffery	1,066	15.5	−0.8
Labour	Andrew James Ansell	978	14.2	−0.1
Liberal Democrats	Alan Henry Richards	421	6.1	−3.9
Majority		3,353	48.7	
Turnout		6,884	74.0	+30.6
Conservative hold		Swing		

=== Burstead ===
Location of Burstead ward

Burstead
Party	Candidate	Votes	%	±%
Conservative	Kevin Blake*	3,898	62.4	−0.5
UKIP	Paul John Downes	1,156	18.5	+8.6
Labour	David Thomas Kirkman	828	13.3	−3.3
Liberal Democrats	Ben Williams	362	5.8	−4.8
Majority		43.9	2,742	
Turnout		6,244	73.0	+29.4
Conservative hold		Swing		

=== Fryerns ===
Location of Fryerns ward

Fryerns
Party	Candidate	Votes	%	±%
Labour	Allan Robert Davies*	1,832	33.6	6.0
UKIP	Cliff Hammans	1,749	32.1	+24.7
Conservative	Sandra Elizabeth Hillier	1,638	30.1	+13.8
Liberal Democrats	Colin Stanley Grant	169	3.1	+2.3
TUSC	David James John Murray	58	1.1	N/A
Majority		83	1.5	
Turnout		5,446	57.0	+26.9
Labour hold		Swing		

=== Laindon Park ===
Location of Laindon Park ward

Laindon Park
Party	Candidate	Votes	%	±%
Conservative	Andrew James Barnes	1,871	35.2	−13.9
UKIP	Anne Marie Waters	1,668	31.4	N/A
Labour	Stephen Gillan	1,408	26.5	−16.9
Liberal Democrats	John Francis Barnes-Challinor	226	4.3	−3.2
Independent	Patricia Ann Rackley	136	2.6	N/A
Majority		203	3.8	
Turnout		5,309	60.0	+27.7
Conservative hold		Swing		

=== Lee Chapel North ===
Location of Lee Chapel North ward

Lee Chapel North
Party	Candidate	Votes	%	±%
Labour	Alan Bennett	1,895	37.4	−17.5
UKIP	Arthur John James	1,825	36.0	N/A
Conservative	Nicole Carrie Schrader	1,131	22.3	−2.4
Liberal Democrats	Steve Nice	215	4.3	−2.4
Majority		70	1.4	
Turnout		5,066	55.0	+25.8
Labour hold		Swing		

=== Nethermayne ===
Location of Nethermayne ward

Nethermayne
Party	Candidate	Votes	%	±%
UKIP	Stephen Michael Hodge	1,700	29.9	+9.7
Conservative	Mark Anthony Coker	1,674	29.4	+6.3
Labour	Andrew Forrest Gordon*	1,518	26.7	−3.5
Liberal Democrats	Phil Jenkins	618	10.9	−13.6
Independent	Pauline Patricia Kettle	176	3.1	N/A
Majority		26	0.5	
Turnout		5,686	64.0	+29.1
UKIP gain from Labour		Swing		

=== Pitsea North West ===
Location of Pitsea North West ward

Pitsea North West
Party	Candidate	Votes	%	±%
UKIP	Gary Canham	1,731	35.2	+18.5
Labour	Keith Bobbin*	1,611	32.8	−14.5
Conservative	Ian David Dwyer	1,424	29.0	−0.9
Liberal Democrats	Martin Keith Howard	149	3.0	−3.1
Majority		120	2.4	
Turnout		4,915	54.0	+28.5
UKIP gain from Labour		Swing		

=== Pitsea South East ===
Location of Pitsea South East ward

Pitsea South East
Party	Candidate	Votes	%	±%
Conservative	Amanda Louise Arnold	1,841	35.2	−8.4
UKIP	Jose Carrion	1,637	31.3	+17.3
Labour	David Edmund Burton-Sampson	1,572	30.1	−8.3
Liberal Democrats	Vivien Jennifer Howard	177	3.4	−0.6
Majority		204	3.9	
Turnout		5,227	60.0	+27.7
Conservative hold		Swing		

=== St Martin's ===
Location of St Martin's ward

St Martin's
Party	Candidate	Votes	%	±%
Labour	Andrew Charles Buxton	1,393	41.1	−16.7
UKIP	Andrew Robert Morris	955	28.2	N/A
Conservative	Stephanie Lucinda Hedley-Barnes	910	26.9	−5.1
Liberal Democrats	Liz Grant	130	3.8	−6.4
Majority		438	12.9	
Turnout		3,388	56.0	+26.5
Labour hold		Swing		

=== Vange ===
Location of Vange ward

Vange
Party	Candidate	Votes	%	±%
Labour	Melissa Anne McGeorge	1,289	36.0	−16.3
UKIP	Michel May	1,136	31.7	+15.5
Conservative	Tony Ball	1,009	28.2	+1.6
Liberal Democrats	Linda Mary Williams	110	3.0	−1.9
TUSC	Samuel James Bennett	39	1.1	N/A
Majority		153	4.3	
Turnout		3,583	53.0	+27.3
Labour hold		Swing		

=== Wickford Castledon ===
Location of Wickford Castleton ward

Wickford Castledon
Party	Candidate	Votes	%	±%
Conservative	Don Morris	2,018	48.2	−11.5
UKIP	Nigel de Lecq Le Gresley	1,529	36.5	N/A
Labour	Jenefer Anne Taylor	641	15.3	−1.2
Majority		489	11.7	
Turnout		4,188	68.0	29.1
Conservative hold		Swing		

Note: The ward had been won by the Conservatives at the last regular election in 2011, but gained by UKIP in a by-election in 2013.

=== Wickford North ===
Location of Wickford North ward

Wickford North
Party	Candidate	Votes	%	±%
Conservative	Michael Owen Mowe*	3,128	47.7	−6.4
UKIP	Eunice Christine Brockman	2,285	34.8	N/A
Labour	Albert Edward Ede	1,147	17.5	+0.9
Majority		843	12.7	
Turnout		6,560	67.0	+29.1
Conservative hold		Swing		

=== Wickford Park ===
Location of Wickford Park ward

Wickford Park
Party	Candidate	Votes	%	±%
Conservative	Chris Jackman*	2,355	51.7	−17.1
UKIP	Derek Harrison	1,474	32.3	N/A
Labour	Matthew Martin Whaley	731	16.0	−4.9
Majority		881	19.4	
Turnout		4,560	55.0	+22.9
Conservative hold		Swing		
