= 2016 Basildon Borough Council election =

2016 UK local government election

← 2015	5 May 2016	2018 →

14 of the 42 seats to Basildon Borough Council 23 seats needed for a majority
	First party	Second party	Third party
Party	Conservative	UKIP	Labour
Last election	18	11	9
Seats before	18	8	9
Seats won	6	3	5
Seats after	18	10	9
Seat change	Steady	▲3	▼1
Popular vote	11,752	8,856	8,772
Percentage	36.9%	27.8%	27.5%
	Fourth party	Fifth party	Sixth party
Party	Wickford Ind.	Independent	Liberal Democrats
Last election	0	2	1
Seats before	3	2	1
Seats won	0	0	0
Seats after	3	2	0
Seat change	Steady	Steady	▼1
Popular vote	N/A	1,550	789
Percentage	N/A	4.5%	2.5%
	Seventh party
Party	Green
Last election	0
Seats before	1
Seats won	0
Seats after	0
Seat change	▼1
Popular vote	137
Percentage	0.4%
- Map showing the results of contested wards in the 2016 Basildon Borough Council elections.
Council control before election
No overall control
Council control after election
No overall control

The 2016 Basildon Borough Council election took place on 5 May 2016 to elect members of Basildon Borough Council in Essex. This was on the same day as other local elections.

== Results summary ==
2016 Basildon Borough Council election
Party	Seats	Gains	Losses	Net gain/loss	Seats %	Votes %	Votes	+/−
Conservative	6	0	0	Steady		36.9	11,752	▼1.5
UKIP	5	3	0	▲3		27.8	8,856	▲10.5
Labour	3	0	1	▼1		27.5	8,772	▼5.1
Independent	0	0	0	Steady		4.5	1,550	▲1.9
Liberal Democrats	0	0	1	▼1		2.5	789	▼5.6
Green	0	0	1	▼1		0.4	137	New

All comparisons in vote share are to the corresponding 2012 election.

== Ward results ==
=== Billericay East ===
Location of Billericay East ward

Billericay East
Party	Candidate	Votes	%	±%
Conservative	Stuart Sullivan	1,716	60.1	+2.6
UKIP	Susan McCaffery	616	21.6	+5.9
Labour	Patricia Reid	523	18.3	+3.6
Majority		1100	38.5	−3.3
Turnout		2855		
Conservative hold		Swing		

=== Billericay West ===
Location of Billericay West ward

Billericay West
Party	Candidate	Votes	%	±%
Conservative	Phillip Turner	1,865	65.6	+3.1
Labour	Jack Ferguson	538	18.9	+0.8
UKIP	Cliff Hammans	442	15.5	−5.8
Majority		1327	46.7	+5.4
Turnout		2845		
Conservative hold		Swing		

=== Burstead ===
Location of Burstead ward

Burstead
Party	Candidate	Votes	%	±%
Conservative	Richard Moore	1,717	62.4	0.0
UKIP	Kevin Piper	620	22.5	+4.0
Labour	David Kirkman	416	15.1	+1.8
Majority				
Turnout				
Conservative hold		Swing		

=== Crouch ===
Crouch
Party	Candidate	Votes	%	±%
Conservative	Stuart Allen	959	54.3	−6.2
UKIP	Richard Petchey	480	27.2	+8.2
Labour	Sally Muylders	326	18.5	−1.9
Majority		479	27.1	−13.2
Turnout		1765		
Conservative hold		Swing		

=== Fryerns ===
Location of Fryerns ward

Fryerns
Party	Candidate	Votes	%	±%
Labour	Adele Brown	983	44.4	+10.8
UKIP	Rhyan Walne	771	34.8	+2.7
Conservative	Tony Law	462	20.8	−9.3
Majority				
Turnout				
Labour hold		Swing		

=== Laindon Park ===
Location of Laindon Park ward

Laindon Park
Party	Candidate	Votes	%	±%
UKIP	Hazel Green	902	37.5	+6.1
Conservative	Gary Maylin	668	27.8	−7.4
Labour	Lewis Blaney	647	26.9	+0.4
Green	Philip Rackley	113	4.7	N/A
Liberal Democrats	Alan Richards	75	3.1	−1.2
Majority				
Turnout				
UKIP gain from Labour		Swing		

=== Langdon Hills ===
Location of Langdon Hills ward

Langdon Hills
Party	Candidate	Votes	%	±%
Conservative	Stephen Hiler	942	39.4	+1.5
UKIP	Philip Gibbs	940	39.3	−1.6
Labour	Alex Harrison	344	14.4	−2.4
Liberal Democrats	Liz Grant	84	3.5	−0.9
Green	John Drummond	83	3.5	N/A
Majority				
Turnout				
Conservative hold		Swing		

=== Lee Chapel North ===
Location of Lee Chapel North ward

Lee Chapel North
Party	Candidate	Votes	%	±%
Labour	Andrew Gordon	1,003	45.5	+8.1
UKIP	Arthur James	814	36.9	+0.9
Conservative	Stephen Yates	363	16.5	−6.2
Independent	Clarence Zwengunde	26	1.2	N/A
Majority				
Turnout				
Labour hold		Swing		

=== Nethermayne ===
Location of Nethermayne ward

Nethermayne
Party	Candidate	Votes	%	±%
UKIP	Derrick Fellowes	733	27.3	−2.6
Labour	Graham Herbing	567	21.1	−5.6
Liberal Democrats	Ben Williams	495	18.4	+7.5
Conservative	Chris Allen	428	15.9	−13.5
Independent	Pauline Kettle	412	15.3	+12.2
Green	Dean Hall	54	2.0	N/A
Majority				
Turnout				
UKIP gain from Liberal Democrats		Swing		

=== Pitsea North West ===
Location of Pitsea North West ward

Pitsea North West
Party	Candidate	Votes	%	±%
Labour	Gavin Callaghan	955	44.3	+11.5
UKIP	Michelle Regan	720	33.4	−1.8
Conservative	Jacqueline Blake	480	22.3	−6.7
Majority				
Turnout				
Labour hold		Swing		

=== Pitsea South East ===
Location of Pitsea South East ward

Pitsea South East
Party	Candidate	Votes	%	±%
UKIP	Jose Carrion	811	35.7	+4.4
Labour	Olukayode Adeniran	791	34.8	+4.7
Conservative	Ian Dwyer	668	29.4	−5.8
Majority				
Turnout				
UKIP gain from Labour		Swing		

=== St. Martin's ===
Location of St Martin's ward

St. Martin's
Party	Candidate	Votes	%	±%
Labour	David Burton-Sampson	688	46.5	+5.4
UKIP	Leslie Allport	450	30.4	+2.2
Conservative	Jeff Henry	341	23.1	−3.8
Majority				
Turnout				
Labour hold		Swing		

=== Vange ===
Location of Vange ward

Vange
Party	Candidate	Votes	%	±%
Labour	Kayte Block	616	41.2	+5.2
UKIP	Terry Latchford	557	37.3	+5.6
Conservative	Tamara Rainford	321	21.5	−6.7
Majority				
Turnout				
Labour hold		Swing		

=== Wickford North ===
Location of Wickford North ward

Wickford North
Party	Candidate	Votes	%	±%
Conservative	Carole Morris	1,186	41.1	−6.5
Independent	Eunice Brockman	1,112	38.6	N/A
Labour	Dolores McGurran	375	13.0	−4.5
Liberal Democrats	David Radley	210	7.3	N/A
Majority				
Turnout				
Conservative hold		Swing		
