= 2012 Basildon Borough Council election =

2012 UK local government election

2012 Basildon District Council election
← 2011	5 May 2012	2014 →

15 of the 42 seats to Basildon District Council 22 seats needed for a majority
	First party	Second party	Third party
Party	Conservative	Labour	Liberal Democrats
Seats before	29	11	2
Seats won	7	7	1
Seats after	25	15	2
Seat change	▼4	▲4	Steady
Popular vote	11,354	9,614	2,401
Percentage	38.4%	32.6%	8.1%
- Map of the results of the 2012 Basildon council election. Conservatives in blue, Labour in red and Liberal Democrats in yellow. Wards in grey were not contested in 2012.
Council control before election
Conservative Party
Council control after election
Conservative Party

The 2012 Basildon Council election took place on 3 May 2012 to elect members of Basildon Borough Council in Essex, England. One third of the council seats was to be elected.

== Overall results ==
2012 Basildon local election result
Party	Seats	Gains	Losses	Net gain/loss	Seats %	Votes %	Votes	+/−
Conservative	7	0	4	▼4	46.7	38.4	11,354	▼7.1
Labour	7	4	0	▲4	46.7	32.6	9,614	▲11.8
Liberal Democrats	1	0	0	Steady	6.7	8.1	2,401	▼3.4
UKIP	0	0	0	Steady	0.0	17.3	5,121	▲15.3
British Freedom	0	0	0	Steady	0.0	0.3	87	▼13.8
English Democrat	0	0	0	Steady	0.0	0.3	94	New
National Front	0	0	0	Steady	0.0	0.4	107	New
Independent	0	0	0	Steady	0.0	2.6	756	▼0.7
Total	15						35,967	

All comparisons in vote share are to the corresponding 2008 election.

== Ward results ==
=== Billericay East ===
Location of Billericay East ward

Billericay East
Party	Candidate	Votes	%	±%
Conservative	Stuart Bryan	1,502	57.5	−6.6
UKIP	Susan McCaffery	409	15.7	+7.5
Labour	Patricia Reid	383	14.7	+1.1
Liberal Democrats	Nigel Horn	316	12.1	−1
Rejected ballots		10		
Majority		1093	41.8	−8.82
Turnout		2610	29	−15.2
Conservative hold		Swing	-7.05	

=== Billericay West ===
Location of Billericay West ward

Billericay West (2)
Party	Candidate	Votes	%	±%
Conservative	Daniel Lawrence	1,688	62.5	−8.6
Conservative	Philip Turner	1,648		
UKIP	Terrence Gandy	574	21.3	+18.0
Labour	Santa Bennet	380	18.1	+10.2
Labour	Andrew Buxton	257		
Liberal Democrats	John James	321	11.9	+0.9
Rejected ballots		18		
Majority		1114	41.3	−18.3
Turnout		2701	29	−14.5
Conservative hold		Swing	-2.5	

=== Burstead ===
Location of Burstead ward

Burstead
Party	Candidate	Votes	%	±%
Conservative	Richard Moore	1,517	62.5	−2.4
UKIP	Cherry Young	396	16.3	+16.3
Labour	Elaine McDonald	359	14.8	+5.7
Liberal Democrats	Benjamin Williams	155	6.4	−6.1
Rejected ballots		13		
Majority		1121	46.2	−5.2
Turnout		2427	28	−15.6
Conservative hold		Swing	-3.1	

=== Crouch ===
Location of Crouch ward

Crouch
Party	Candidate	Votes	%	±%
Conservative	Stuart Allen	888	61	−1
Labour	Sarah Davies	299	20	−4
UKIP	Graham Starling	279	19	19
Rejected ballots		7		
Majority		589	40.2	−6.5
Turnout		1466	23	−44
Conservative hold		Swing	-2.5	

=== Fryerns ===
Location of Fryerns ward

Fryerns
Party	Candidate	Votes	%	±%
Labour	Adele Brown	1,097	55	+11.8
Conservative	Tina Arnold	399	20	−5.5
UKIP	David Sheppard	366	18	+6.5
Liberal Democrats	Arnold Lutton	137	7	−1.5
Rejected ballots		11		
Majority		698		
Turnout		2012	21	−9.1
Labour hold		Swing		

=== Laindon Park ===
Location of Laindon Park ward

Laindon Park
Party	Candidate	Votes	%	±%
Labour	John Scarola	867	41	2.4
Conservative	Frank Tomlin	691	33	−16.1
UKIP	Mark Ellis	388	19	19
British Freedom	Tony Harris	87	4	4
Liberal Democrats	Colin Grant	61	3	−4.5
Rejected ballots		6		
Majority		176		
Turnout		2094	25	−7.3
Labour gain from Conservative		Swing		

=== Langdon Hills ===
Location of Langdon Hills ward

Langdon Hills
Party	Candidate	Votes	%	±%
Conservative	Stephen Hillier	879	43	−11
Labour	Jenefer Taylor	651	32	14
UKIP	Andy Ager	377	18	12
Liberal Democrats	Liz Grant	108	5	−11
Independent	Matthew Ing	44	2	2
Rejected ballots		3		
Majority		228	11	−24.8
Turnout		2062	30	−40
Conservative hold		Swing	-12.5	

=== Lee Chapel North ===
Location of Lee Chapel North ward

Lee Chapel North
Party	Candidate	Votes	%	±%
Labour	Lynda Gordon	1,048	54	−0.9
UKIP	Frank Ferguson	359	18	18
Conservative	Craig Rimmer	343	18	−10.8
National Front	Thomas Beaney	107	6	−3.5
Liberal Democrats	Steve Nice	85	4	−2.7
Rejected ballots		11		
Majority		689		
Turnout		1942	22	−7.2
Labour hold		Swing		

=== Nethermayne ===
Location of Nethermayne ward

Nethermayne
Party	Candidate	Votes	%	±%
Liberal Democrats	Geoff Williams	899	36	11.5
Labour Co-op	Swatantra Nandanwar	578	23	−7.2
UKIP	Kerry Smith	573	23	2.8
Conservative	Andrew Schrader	427	17	−6.1
	X None of the Above	36	1	−1.1
Rejected ballots		2517		
Majority		321		
Turnout		2517	28	−6.9
Liberal Democrats hold		Swing		

=== Pitsea North West ===
Location of Pitsea North West ward

Pitsea North West
Party	Candidate	Votes	%	±%
Labour	Gavin Callaghan	932	49	1.7
Conservative	Andrew Baggott	564	29	−0.9
UKIP	Terry McBride	323	17	0.3
Liberal Democrats	Martin Howard	97	5	−1.1
Rejected ballots		7		
Majority		368		
Turnout		1923	21	−4.5
Labour gain from Conservative		Swing		

=== Pitsea South East ===
Location of Pitsea South East ward

Pitsea South East
Party	Candidate	Votes	%	±%
Labour	Aidan McGurran	933	41	2.6
Conservative	Ann Blake	876	39	−4.6
UKIP	Imelda Clancy	375	16	2
Liberal Democrats	Viv Howard	91	4	0
Rejected ballots		9		
Majority		9		
Turnout		2284	27	−6.3
Labour gain from Conservative		Swing		

=== St. Martin's ===
Location of St Martin's ward

St Martin's
Party	Candidate	Votes	%	±%
Labour	Phillip William	759	58	−0.2
Conservative	Tony Low	248	19	−13
UKIP	Peter Wood	229	17	17
Liberal Democrats	Clare Nice	80	6	−4.2
Rejected ballots		5		
Majority		511		
Turnout		1322	22	−7.5
Labour hold		Swing		

=== Vange ===
Location of Vange ward

Vange
Party	Candidate	Votes	%	±%
Labour	Byron Taylor	919	59	6.7
Conservative	Luke MacKenzie	320	20	−6.6
UKIP	Becky Ager	274	18	1.8
Liberal Democrats	Phillip Jenkins	51	3	−1.9
Rejected ballots		11		
Majority		599		
Turnout		1564	23	−7.6
Labour gain from Conservative		Swing		

=== Wickford North ===
Location of Wickford North ward

Wickford North
Party	Candidate	Votes	%	±%
Conservative	Carole Morris	1,012	42	−12.1
Independent	Dave Harrison	676	28	3
Labour	Albert Ede	409	17	0.4
UKIP	Trevor Malsbury	199	8	8
English Democrat	Stephen Smith	94	4	4
Rejected ballots		9		
Majority		336		
Turnout		2399	25	−12.3
Conservative hold		Swing		

== Sources ==
https://web.archive.org/web/20120411150856/http://www.basildon.gov.uk/CHttpHandler.ashx?id=3946&p=0 Statement of Persons Nominated
