= 2011 Basildon Borough Council election =

2011 UK local government election

2011 Basildon District Council election
← 2010	5 May 2011	2012 →

15 of the 42 seats to Basildon District Council 22 seats needed for a majority
	First party	Second party	Third party
Party	Conservative	Labour	Liberal Democrats
Seats before	29	10	3
Seats won	8	7	0
Seats after	29	11	2
Seat change	Steady	▲1	▼1
Popular vote	18,842	12,342	3,766
Percentage	46.6%	30.5%	9.3%
- Map of the results of the 2011 Basildon council election. Conservatives in blue, Labour in red and Liberal Democrats in yellow. Wards in grey were not contested in 2011.
Council control before election
Conservative Party
Council control after election
Conservative Party

The 2011 Basildon Council election took place on 5 May 2011 to elect members of Basildon Borough Council in Essex, England. One third of the council was up for election and the Conservative Party stayed in overall control of the council.

After the election, the composition of the council was

- Conservative 29
- Labour 11
- Liberal Democrats 2

== Election result ==
The results saw the Conservatives stay in control of the council after retaining all of the seats they had been defending. This left the Conservatives with 29 seats, compared to 11 for Labour. Meanwhile, the Liberal Democrats were reduced to 2 councillors and the party lost vote share across the council. Overall turnout in the election was 35%.

The only change in the election saw Labour gain 1 seat from the Liberal Democrats in Nethermayne, with the winning Labour candidate, Andrew Gordon, becoming the youngest councillor at the age of 18. Among the other winners was Daniel Munyambu for Labour in Vange, who became the second Kenyan to be elected as a councillor in the United Kingdom, and the former council leader Nigel Smith who returned to the council in Lee Chapel North.

2011 Basildon local election result
Party	Seats	Gains	Losses	Net gain/loss	Seats %	Votes %	Votes	+/−
Conservative	8	0	0	Steady	53.3	46.0	19,430	▲2.8
Labour	7	1	0	▲1	46.7	32.1	13,532	▲9.8
Liberal Democrats	0	0	1	▼1	0.0	8.9	3,766	▼4.0
UKIP	0	0	0	Steady	0.0	8.2	3,475	▲7.0
Independent	0	0	0	Steady	0.0	3.2	1,336	▼4.6
BNP	0	0	0	Steady	0.0	0.8	356	▼11.2
National Front	0	0	0	Steady	0.0	0.6	244	New
None of The Above	0	0	0	Steady	0.0	0.1	63	New

All comparisons in vote share are to the corresponding 2007 election.

== Ward results ==
=== Billericay East ===
Location of Billericay East ward

Billericay East
Party	Candidate	Votes	%	±%
Conservative	David Dadds	2,626	64.6	+3.5
Labour	Patricia Reid	567	13.9	+2.9
Liberal Democrats	Nigel Horn	528	13.0	−7.3
UKIP	Susan McCaffery	346	8.5	+3.9
Majority		2,059	50.6	+9.9
Turnout		4,067	44.2	−30
Conservative hold		Swing		

=== Billericay West ===
Location of Billericay West ward

Billericay West
Party	Candidate	Votes	%	±%
Conservative	Stephen Horgan	2,416	59.3	−3.9
UKIP	Terry Gandy	665	16.3	+12.7
Labour	Geoffrey Bores	584	14.3	+3.0
Liberal Democrats	John James	407	10.0	−8.6
Majority		1,751	43.0	−1.6
Turnout		4,072	43.5	−30
Conservative hold		Swing		

=== Burstead ===
Location of Burstead ward

Burstead
Party	Candidate	Votes	%	±%
Conservative	Kevin Blake	2,330	62.9	+4.6
Labour	Sandra Bennett	615	16.6	+5.1
Liberal Democrats	Stewart Goshawk	393	10.6	−6.1
UKIP	Cherry Young	367	9.9	+0.5
Majority		1,715	46.3	+4.8
Turnout		3,705	43.6	−29
Conservative hold		Swing		

=== Fryerns (2 seats) ===
Location of Fryerns ward

Fryerns (2)
Party	Candidate	Votes	%	±%
Labour	Allan Davies	1,365	27.6	
Labour	David Kirkman	1,190	24.1	
Conservative	Gwen Ball	806	16.3	
Conservative	James Paton	588	11.9	
UKIP	David Sheppard	365	7.4	
BNP	Len Heather	356	7.2	
Liberal Democrats	Arnold Lutton	269	5.4	
Turnout		4,939	30.1	−26
Labour hold		Swing		
Labour hold		Swing		

=== Laindon Park ===
Location of Laindon Park ward

Laindon Park
Party	Candidate	Votes	%	±%
Conservative	Jilly Hyde	1,318	49.1	+6.0
Labour	John McCrea	1,166	43.4	+13.2
Liberal Democrats	Colin Grant	201	7.5	−9.3
Majority		152	5.7	−7.2
Turnout		2,685	32.3	−27
Conservative hold		Swing		

=== Lee Chapel North ===
Location of Lee Chapel North ward

Lee Chapel North
Party	Candidate	Votes	%	±%
Labour	Nigel Smith	1,408	54.9	+17.5
Conservative	Christine Hedley	740	28.8	−5.1
National Front	Thomas Beaney	244	9.5	+9.5
Liberal Democrats	Emma Peall	173	6.7	−10.9
Majority		668	26.0	+22.5
Turnout		2,565	29.2	−26
Labour hold		Swing		

=== Nethermayne ===
Location of Nethermayne ward

Nethermayne
Party	Candidate	Votes	%	±%
Labour	Andrew Gordon	926	30.2	+6.5
Liberal Democrats	Phil Jenkins	752	24.5	−11.9
Conservative	Stephen Foster	709	23.1	−8.1
UKIP	Kerry Smith	619	20.2	+20.2
Independent	None of the Above X	63	2.1	+2.1
Majority		174	5.7	
Turnout		3,069	34.9	−28
Labour gain from Liberal Democrats		Swing		

=== Pitsea North West ===
Location of Pitsea North West ward

Pitsea North West
Party	Candidate	Votes	%	±%
Labour	Keith Bobbin	1,111	47.3	+16.2
Conservative	Danny Lawrence	702	29.9	−4.2
UKIP	Terry McBride	391	16.7	+7.4
Liberal Democrats	Martin Howard	143	6.1	−9.8
Majority		409	17.4	
Turnout		2,347	25.5	−27
Labour hold		Swing		

=== Pitsea South East ===
Location of Pitsea South East ward

Pitsea South East
Party	Candidate	Votes	%	±%
Conservative	Mo Larkin	1,197	43.6	+3.9
Labour	Mark Walker	1,056	38.4	+6.6
UKIP	Imelda Clancy	384	14.0	+5.5
Liberal Democrats	Vivien Howard	110	4.0	−7.6
Majority		141	5.1	−2.9
Turnout		2,747	32.3	−26
Conservative hold		Swing		

=== St Martin's ===
Location of St Martin's ward

St Martin's
Party	Candidate	Votes	%	±%
Labour	Patricia Rackley	1,004	57.8	+19.7
Conservative	Andrew Schrader	557	32.0	+3.2
Liberal Democrats	Michael Dickinson	177	10.2	−1.3
Majority		447	25.7	+16.4
Turnout		1,738	29.5	+6
Labour hold		Swing		

=== Vange ===
Location of Vange ward

Vange
Party	Candidate	Votes	%	±%
Labour	Daniel Munyambu	1,089	52.3	+21.4
Conservative	Andrew Morris	554	26.6	−9.2
UKIP	Kim Gandy	338	16.2	+16.2
Liberal Democrats	Elizabeth Grant	102	4.9	−1.4
Majority		535	25.7	
Turnout		2,083	30.6	+7
Labour hold		Swing		

=== Wickford Castledon ===
Location of Wickford Castleton ward

Wickford Castledon
Party	Candidate	Votes	%	±%
Conservative	Sylvia Buckley	1,434	59.7	+0.4
Independent	Alan Ball	446	18.6	+18.6
Labour	Sarah Davies	397	16.5	−0.8
Liberal Democrats	Tony Morris	127	5.3	−11.6
Majority		988	41.1	−0.9
Turnout		2,404	38.9	−30
Conservative hold		Swing		

=== Wickford North ===
Location of Wickford North ward

Wickford North
Party	Candidate	Votes	%	±%
Conservative	Michael Mowe	1,925	54.1	−4.0
Independent	Dave Harrison	890	25.0	+25.0
Labour	Thomas Kirkman	590	16.6	+0.2
Liberal Democrats	John Spriggs	155	4.4	−13.0
Majority		1,035	29.1	−11.6
Turnout		3,560	37.3	−29
Conservative hold		Swing		

=== Wickford Park ===
Location of Wickford Park ward

Wickford Park
Party	Candidate	Votes	%	±%
Conservative	Chris Jackman	1,528	68.8	+10.1
Labour	Andrew Buxton	464	20.9	+5.3
Liberal Democrats	John McGarrigle	229	10.3	−8.2
Majority		1,064	47.9	+7.7
Turnout		2,221	32.1	−32
Conservative hold		Swing		
