= 1976 Basildon District Council election =

1976 UK local government election

← 1973	6 May 1976	1979 →

All 46 seats to Basildon District Council 24 seats needed for a majority
	First party	Second party	Third party
Party	Labour	Conservative	Residents
Last election	31	9	6
Seats won	23	17	6
Seat change	▼8	▲8	Steady
Popular vote	13,895	17,427	5,447
Percentage	36.5%	45.7%	14.2%
Council control before election
Labour
Council control after election
No overall control

The 1976 Basildon District Council election took place on 6 May 1976 to elect members of Basildon District Council in Essex, England. This was on the same day as other local elections. The Labour Party lost overall control of the council, which fell under no overall control.

== Overall results ==
1976 Basildon District Council Election
Party	Seats	Gains	Losses	Net gain/loss	Seats %	Votes %	Votes	+/−
Labour	23	0	8	▼8	50.0	36.5	13,895	▼8.5
Conservative	17	8	0	▲8	37.0	45.7	17,427	▲10.4
Residents	6	0	0	Steady	13.0	14.2	5,447	▲0.5
Liberal	0	0	0	Steady	0.0	1.8	680	▼0.7
Independent	0	0	0	Steady	0.0	0.9	348	
National Front	0	0	0	Steady	0.0	0.6	244	New
Communist	0	0	0	Steady	0.0	0.2	66	▼0.2
Total	46						38,107	

== Ward results ==
=== Barstable (3 seats) ===
Barstable (3)
Party	Candidate	Votes	%
Labour	E. Gelder	1,134	
Labour	C. Sweeney	1,127	
Labour	W. Blunkell	1,103	
Conservative	B. Bartlett	696	
Conservative	H. Liebner	626	
Conservative	D. Solly	609	
Turnout			29.0%
Labour hold			
Labour hold			
Labour hold			

=== Billericay (3 seats) ===
Billericay (3)
Party	Candidate	Votes	%
Conservative	G. Copley	1,842	
Conservative	K. Emery	1,822	
Conservative	R. Marshall	1,799	
Residents	M. Cooke	1,365	
Residents	N. Curtis	1,298	
Residents	M. Heywood	1,271	
Labour	T. Moul	342	
Labour	D. Lane	328	
Labour	G. Brooke	314	
Turnout			57.7%
Conservative hold			
Conservative hold			
Conservative hold			

=== Burstead (3 seats) ===
Burstead (3)
Party	Candidate	Votes	%
Residents	B. Hooks	1,763	
Residents	C. Jones	1,736	
Residents	F. Young	1,710	
Conservative	M. Hawkins	960	
Conservative	C. Wilson	929	
Labour	P. Hepburn	257	
Labour	R. Prattle	245	
Liberal	M. Howard	239	
Labour	H. Wiles	238	
Liberal	P. Johnson	175	
Liberal	T. McCartan	169	
Turnout			49.2%
Residents hold			
Residents hold			
Residents hold			

=== Buttsbury (3 seats) ===
Buttsbury (3)
Party	Candidate	Votes	%
Residents	H. Wilkins	2,099	
Residents	A. Greaves	2,069	
Residents	J. Openshaw	2,042	
Conservative	J. Quirk	1,997	
Conservative	N. Stanley	1,977	
Conservative	A. Archer	1,892	
Labour	E. Greenbow	163	
Labour	I. Grant	140	
Labour	J. Bacon	109	
Turnout			61.2%
Residents hold			
Residents hold			
Residents hold			

=== Castleton (4 seats) ===
Castleton (4)
Party	Candidate	Votes	%
Conservative	C. Ball	2,311	
Conservative	T. Taylor	2,154	
Conservative	G. Jones	2,122	
Conservative	V. Ridley	2,084	
Labour	R. Green	544	
Labour	C. Robinson	524	
Labour	E. Munting	500	
Labour	I. Ambrose	497	
Independent	R. Burge	348	
Turnout			38.2%
Conservative hold			
Conservative hold			
Conservative hold			
Conservative hold			

=== Central (3 seats) ===
Central (3)
Party	Candidate	Votes	%
Labour	P. Davey	1,399	
Labour	D. Harrison	1,265	
Labour	V. Ganesan	1,208	
Conservative	E. Copland	1,126	
Conservative	D. Hull	1,095	
Conservative	C. Cooksey	1,089	
Turnout			43.5%
Labour hold			
Labour hold			
Labour hold			

=== Fryerns East (3 seats) ===
Fryerns East (3)
Party	Candidate	Votes	%
Labour	A. Dove	1,175	
Labour	J. Potter	1,042	
Labour	N. Potter	1,011	
Conservative	R. Hughes	533	
Conservative	M. Humphreys	532	
Conservative	H. Dixon	517	
Turnout			31.7%
Labour hold			
Labour hold			
Labour hold			

=== Fryerns West (3 seats) ===
Fryerns West (3)
Party	Candidate	Votes	%
Labour	R. Walker	993	
Labour	P. Ballard	988	
Labour	C. O'Brien	962	
Conservative	J. Damm	540	
Conservative	R. Sheridan	513	
Conservative	J. Francklin	500	
Turnout			36.0%
Labour hold			
Labour hold			
Labour hold			

=== Laindon (4 seats) ===
Laindon (4)
Party	Candidate	Votes	%
Labour	C. Lynch	1,410	
Labour	B. Edwards	1,368	
Labour	G. Krejzl	1,323	
Conservative	G. Buckenham	1,295	
Labour	E. Lane	1,275	
Conservative	A. Borlase	1,253	
Conservative	D. Lovey	1,210	
Conservative	V. York	1,183	
Liberal	D. Field	237	
Liberal	R. Collins	234	
Liberal	D. Foskett	221	
Liberal	B. Roughley	212	
Turnout			32.5%
Labour hold			
Labour hold			
Labour hold			
Conservative gain from Labour			

=== Langdon Hills (3 seats) ===
Langdon Hills (3)
Party	Candidate	Votes	%
Conservative	P. Cole	1,267	
Conservative	J. Hopkins	1,102	
Conservative	S. Blackbourn	1,078	
Labour	I. Harlow	876	
Labour	G. Lynch	858	
Labour	J. Jekyll	838	
Residents	I. Macdonald	220	
Residents	B. Simmons	200	
Turnout			42.1%
Conservative gain from Labour			
Conservative gain from Labour			
Conservative hold			

=== Lee Chapel North (3 seats) ===
Lee Chapel North (3)
Party	Candidate	Votes	%
Labour	J. Costello	1,761	
Labour	R. Austin	1,441	
Labour	D. Austin	1,385	
Conservative	S. Copland	556	
Conservative	S. Wilson	546	
Conservative	B. Pennell	532	
Liberal	C. Collins	204	
Liberal	P. Tremain	161	
Liberal	B. Mavis	159	
Communist	B. Denny	66	
Turnout			44.2%
Labour hold			
Labour hold			
Labour hold			

=== Pitsea (3 seats) ===
Pitsea (3)
Party	Candidate	Votes	%
Labour	J. Amey	1,346	
Conservative	M. Davies	1,276	
Conservative	F. Laine	1,258	
Conservative	M. Stevens	1,246	
Labour	E. Dines	1,241	
Labour	A. Woolford	1,240	
National Front	B. Weedon	244	
National Front	G. Dudley	225	
National Front	L. Gardiner	203	
Turnout			40.2%
Labour hold			
Conservative gain from Labour			
Conservative gain from Labour			

=== Vange (4 seats) ===
Vange (4)
Party	Candidate	Votes	%
Labour	M. Miller	1,248	
Labour	H. Tinworth	1,186	
Labour	H. Witzer	1,181	
Labour	D. Lock	1,180	
Conservative	W. Burles	680	
Conservative	J. Dolby	662	
Conservative	A. Featherstone	661	
Conservative	R. Pennell	656	
Turnout			31.5%
Labour hold			
Labour hold			
Labour hold			
Labour hold			

=== Wickford (4 seats) ===
Wickford (4)
Party	Candidate	Votes	%
Conservative	R. Ridley	2,348	
Conservative	L. Yorke	2,258	
Conservative	M. Ryan	2,235	
Conservative	P. Farmer	2,177	
Labour	M. Walsh	1,247	
Labour	L. Harrison	1,183	
Labour	B. Hurley	1,169	
Labour	J. Edwards	1,107	
Turnout			47.9%
Conservative hold			
Conservative gain from Labour			
Conservative gain from Labour			
Conservative gain from Labour			
