= David Burton-Sampson =

British politician (born 1977)

David Burton-Sampson MP
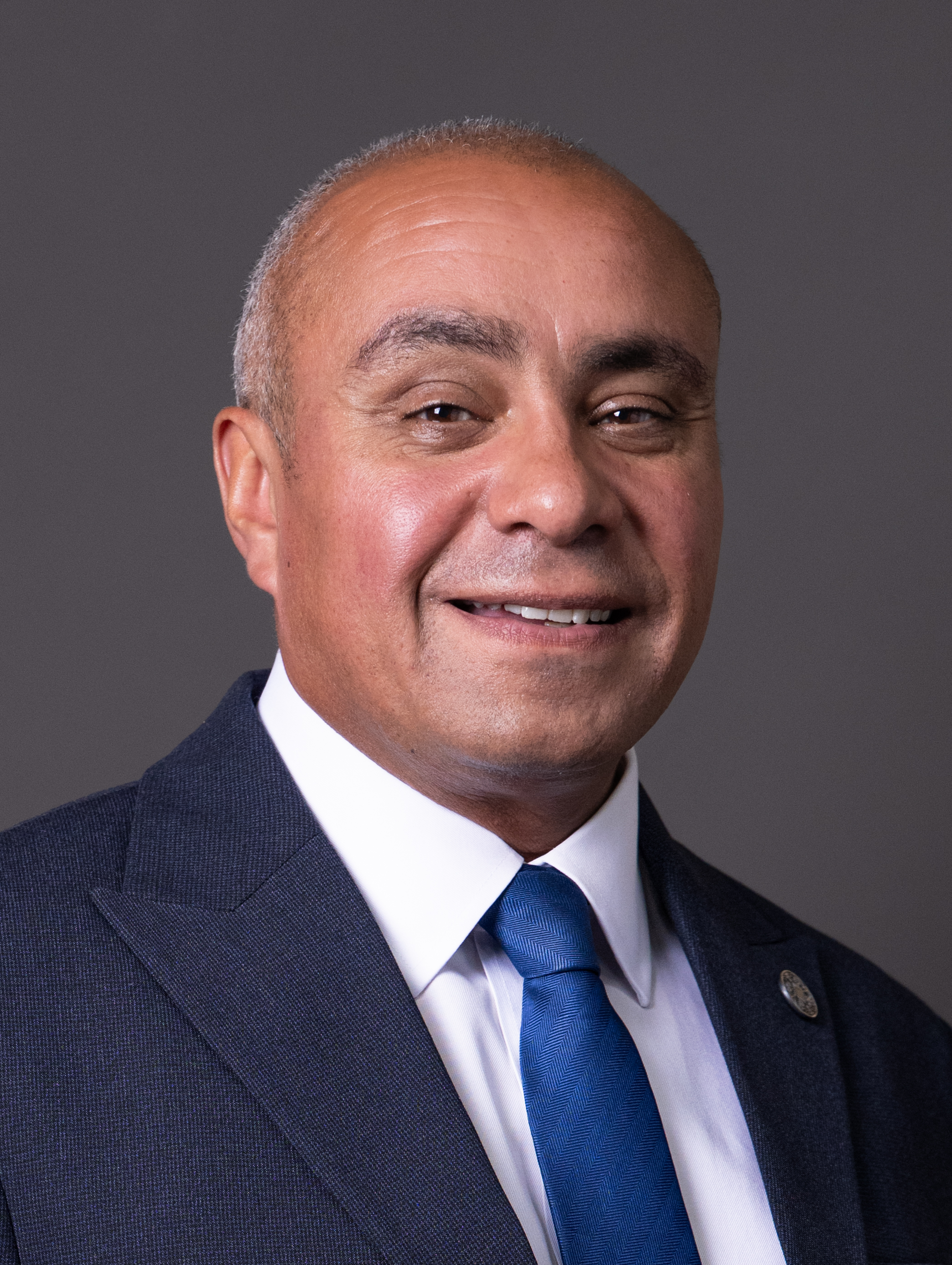
- Official portrait, 2026

Member of Parliament for Southend West and Leigh
- Incumbent
- Assumed office 4 July 2024
- Preceded by: Anna Firth
- Majority: 1,949 (4.1%)

Mayor of Basildon
- In office 23 May 2019 – 27 May 2021
- Deputy: Derrick Fellowes
- Preceded by: David Dadds
- Succeeded by: David Dadds

Deputy Mayor of Basildon
- In office 25 May 2017 – 24 May 2018
- Mayor: David Harrison
- Preceded by: Stephen Ward
- Succeeded by: Daniel Lawrence

Basildon Borough Councillor for St Martin's
- In office 9 May 2016 – 11 May 2021
- Preceded by: Phillip William
- Succeeded by: Davida Ademuyiwa

Personal details
- Born: David Edmund Burton-Sampson; November 1977 (age 48) Crosby, Merseyside, England
- Party: Labour
- Domestic partner: Mark (2011–present)
- Education: Holy Family Catholic High School
- Alma mater: Liverpool Institute for Performing Arts (BA)
- Website: www.davidburtonsampson.co.uk

David Edmund Burton-Sampson (born November 1977) is a British Labour Party politician who has been the Member of Parliament (MP) for Southend West and Leigh since the 2024 general election.

== Early life ==
Burton-Sampson was born in November 1977 in Crosby, Merseyside. He was raised by a single mother. Burton-Sampson attended Holy Family Catholic High School in Thornton from 1989 to 1996 before graduating with a BA in performing arts from the Liverpool Institute for Performing Arts in 1999. After graduating, he moved to London to pursue a career in the performing arts but ultimately began a career in management, eventually working for Metro Bank. Burton-Sampson has lived in Essex since 1999.

== Political career ==
Burton-Sampson was elected as a Labour Party councillor for St Martin's in the 2016 Basildon Borough Council election. He eventually became the deputy leader of the Labour group on the council. In May 2017, he was appointed deputy mayor of Basildon to serve a one-year term under mayor David Harrison of the Wickford Independents. In May 2019, he was appointed mayor of Basildon on a one-year term, however, his term was extended by a year due to the COVID-19 pandemic. In the 2021 council election, Burton-Sampson lost his seat to Conservative candidate Davida Ademuyiwa.

In May 2024, Burton-Sampson was selected as the Labour candidate for Southend West and Leigh in the 2024 general election. He won the seat with a majority of 1,949 votes, unseating the Conservative incumbent Anna Firth who had won the seat in an uncontested by-election following the October 2021 murder of then-MP Sir David Amess. In Parliament, Burton-Sampson chairs the all-party parliamentary group on open banking and payments, and co-chairs the APPG on fair banking. He also serves as the vice chair for the APPGs on micromobility and Ukraine as well as an officer for the APPGs on Parkinson's disease and male suicide.

In May 2026, he replaced Joe Morris as parliamentary private secretary to the Department of Health and Social Care.

== Personal life ==
He is gay and has been in a civil partnership with his partner Mark since 10 June 2011. He is the chair of Basildon Pride and is a Christian.

== Electoral performance ==
=== House of Commons ===
General election 2024: Southend West and Leigh
Party	Candidate	Votes	%	±%
Labour	David Burton-Sampson	16,739	35.6	+6.6
Conservative	Anna Firth	14,790	31.5	−27.6
Reform	Peter Little	8,273	17.6	New
Green	Tilly Hogrebe	3,262	6.9	New
Liberal Democrats	Stephen Cummins	3,174	6.8	−3.8
Confelicity	James Miller	262	0.6	New
Independent	Tom Darwood	172	0.4	New
Heritage	Lara Hurley	99	0.2	New
Psychedelic Movement	Jason Pilley	99	0.2	New
Independent	Robert Francis	98	0.2	New
Majority		1,949	4.1	
Turnout		46,968	62.5	–4.4
Labour gain from Conservative		Swing	+17.1	

=== Basildon Borough Council ===
2021 Basildon Borough Council election: St Martin's
Party	Candidate	Votes	%	±%
Conservative	Davida Ademuyiwa	697	39.5	+4.8
Labour	David Burton-Sampson	675	38.3	–9.1
BCRP	Patricia Rackley	309	17.5	New
Liberal Democrats	Philip Jenkins	83	4.7	−13.2
Majority		22	1.2	
Turnout		1,764	25.2	+4.2
Conservative gain from Labour				

2016 Basildon Borough Council election: St Martin's
Party	Candidate	Votes	%	±%
Labour	David Burton-Sampson	688	46.5	+5.4
UKIP	Leslie Allport	450	30.4	+2.2
Conservative	Jeff Henry	341	23.1	−3.8
Majority		238		
Turnout		1,479		
Labour hold				
