= 1973 Basildon District Council election =

1973 UK local government election

7 June 1973	1976 →

All 46 seats to Basildon District Council 24 seats needed for a majority
	First party	Second party	Third party
Party	Labour	Conservative	Residents
Seats won	31	9	6
Popular vote	12,043	9,458	3,659
Percentage	45.0%	35.3%	13.7%
Council control after election
Labour

The 1973 Basildon Borough Council election were the first elections to the newly created Basildon District Council and took place on 7 June 1973. This was on the same day as other local elections. The Local Government Act 1972 stipulated that the elected members were to shadow and eventually take over from the predecessor corporation on 1 April 1974. The election resulted in Labour gaining control of the council.

== Overall results ==
1973 Basildon District Council Election
Party	Seats	Gains	Losses	Net gain/loss	Seats %	Votes %	Votes	+/−
Labour	31					48.1	14,730	
Conservative	9					33.8	10,348	
Residents	6					12.0	3,659	
Democratic Labour	0					3.1	957	
Liberal	0					1.8	543	
Independent	0					0.8	233	
Communist	0					0.4	117	
Ind. Labour Party	0					0.2	73	
Total	46						30,607	
Labour win								

== Ward results ==
=== Barstable (3 seats) ===
Barstable (3)
Party	Candidate	Votes	%
Labour	D. Hicks	902	
Labour	E. Gelder	888	
Labour	C. Sweeney	765	
Democratic Labour	M. Crew	589	
Democratic Labour	J. Morgan	560	
Democratic Labour	W. Jeans	421	
Conservative	C. Walker	220	
Conservative	M. Rowley	217	
Conservative	D. Williams	213	
Turnout			28.4%

=== Billericay (3 seats) ===
Billericay (3)
Party	Candidate	Votes	%
Conservative	D. Greenfield	1,166	
Conservative	T. Dove	1,149	
Conservative	H. Quirk	1,135	
Residents	M. Cooke	1,058	
Residents	D. Walster	984	
Residents	J. Turner	979	
Labour	A. Bone	253	
Labour	L. Dore	251	
Labour	F. Lane	251	
Turnout			41.4%

=== Burstead (3 seats) ===
Burstead (3)
Party	Candidate	Votes	%
Residents	C. Jones	1,046	
Residents	B. Hooks	1,040	
Residents	F. Young	963	
Conservative	B. Bartlett	498	
Conservative	P. Kemp	472	
Conservative	C. Wilson	458	
Liberal	E. Fortune	452	
Liberal	M. Howard	378	
Liberal	V. Wood	362	
Labour	I. Harlow	271	
Labour	R. Prattle	254	
Labour	R. Allen	252	
Turnout			36.5%

=== Buttsbury (3 seats) ===
Buttsbury (3)
Party	Candidate	Votes	%
Residents	M. Horton	1,555	
Residents	H. Wilkins	1,498	
Residents	J. Openshaw	1,491	
Conservative	J. Heath	1,191	
Conservative	D. Crosland	1,116	
Conservative	D. Lovey	1,080	
Labour	E. Rowlands	182	
Labour	E. Hamilton	180	
Labour	D. Lane	151	
Turnout			42.2%

=== Castleton (4 seats) ===
Castleton (4)
Party	Candidate	Votes	%
Conservative	C. Ball	1,515	
Conservative	G. Jones	1,493	
Conservative	T. Taylor	1,493	
Conservative	C. Mills	1,474	
Labour	J. Edwards	674	
Labour	R. Green	658	
Labour	R. Oliver	650	
Labour	W. Walsh	621	
Turnout			28.3%

=== Central (3 seats) ===
Central (3)
Party	Candidate	Votes	%
Labour	P. Davey	1,112	
Labour	S. Hughes	1,068	
Labour	D. Harrison	1,029	
Conservative	D. Hull	402	
Conservative	A. Featherstone	372	
Conservative	T. Featherstone	366	
Democratic Labour	F. Crow	264	
Democratic Labour	P. Curtis	209	
Turnout			31.3%

=== Fryerns East (3 seats) ===
Fryerns East (3)
Party	Candidate	Votes	%
Labour	A. Dove	740	
Labour	J. Potter	621	
Labour	A. Sykes	616	
Conservative	J. Hopkins	263	
Conservative	H. Dixon	230	
Turnout			17.3%

=== Fryerns West (3 seats) ===
Fryerns West (3)
Party	Candidate	Votes	%
Labour	P. Ballard	737	
Labour	C. O'Brien	723	
Labour	R. Walker	720	
Conservative	D. Tuckett	127	
Conservative	N. Tuckett	109	
Ind. Labour Party	R. Chaplin	73	
Ind. Labour Party	B. Chaplin	61	
Ind. Labour Party	G. Coster	43	
Turnout			20.3%

=== Laindon (4 seats) ===
Laindon (4)
Party	Candidate	Votes	%
Labour	C. Lynch	1,195	
Labour	G. Ward	1,159	
Labour	H. Woodman	1,150	
Labour	V. Ganesan	1,096	
Conservative	G. Harris	780	
Conservative	E. Lane	771	
Conservative	F. Trudgett	742	
Conservative	S. Wilson	726	
Turnout			21.1%

=== Langdon Hills (3 seats) ===
Langdon Hills (3)
Party	Candidate	Votes	%
Labour	M. Lynch	696	
Labour	G. Krejzl	691	
Conservative	P. Cole	607	
Labour	H. Witzer	594	
Conservative	R. Britnell	550	
Conservative	C. Cordery	547	
Democratic Labour	B. Simmons	104	
Democratic Labour	A. Damm	63	
Turnout			29.1%

=== Lee Chapel North (3 seats) ===
Lee Chapel North (3)
Party	Candidate	Votes	%
Labour	J. Costello	1,406	
Labour	D. Harkness	1,309	
Labour	S. Woods	1,296	
Conservative	D. Jones	248	
Conservative	B. Pennell	245	
Conservative	B. Owen	241	
Communist	B. Denny	117	
Turnout			32.4%

=== Pitsea (3 seats) ===
Pitsea (3)
Party	Candidate	Votes	%
Labour	J. Amey	990	
Labour	H. Tinworth	914	
Labour	D. Kelland	905	
Conservative	B. Laine	641	
Conservative	J. Lyon	627	
Conservative	P. Laine	589	
Turnout			29.0%

=== Vange (4 seats) ===
Vange (4)
Party	Candidate	Votes	%
Labour	R. Austin	1,284	
Labour	D. Austin	1,224	
Labour	R. Farndon	1,199	
Labour	L. Harris	1,198	
Conservative	W. Burles	338	
Conservative	R. Pennell	296	
Conservative	L. Jones	286	
Conservative	T. Murphy	278	
Turnout			24.6%

=== Wickford (4 seats) ===
Wickford (4)
Party	Candidate	Votes	%
Labour	R. Taylor	1,601	
Labour	B. Edwards	1,505	
Labour	D. Lock	1,469	
Conservative	R. Ridley	1,462	
Labour	D. Jones	1,460	
Conservative	J. Tonkinson	1,399	
Conservative	L. Yorke	1,393	
Conservative	H. Brady	1,346	
Turnout			40.7%
