= 2018 Basildon Borough Council election =

2018 UK local government election

- 3 May 2018

14 of the 42 seats to Basildon Borough Council 22 seats needed for a majority
	First party	Second party	Third party
Party	Conservative	Labour	UKIP
Seats before	18	9	15
Seats won	10	3	0
Seats after	23	12	5
Seat change	▲5	▲3	▼10
Popular vote	18,468	8,265	2,596
Percentage	51.3%	23.0%	7.2%
	Fourth party
Party	Independent
Seats before	0
Seats won	2
Seats after	2
Seat change	▲2
Popular vote	3,891
Percentage	10.8%
- Map showing the results of contested wards in the 2018 Basildon Borough Council elections.
Council control before election
No overall control
Council control after election
Conservative

The 2018 Basildon Borough Council election took place on 3 May 2018 to elect members of Basildon Borough Council in Essex. This was on the same day as other local elections. The Conservative Party gained overall control of the council. which had previously been under no overall control and run by a coalition between UKIP, Labour and Independents.

After the election, the composition of the council was

- Conservative 23
- Labour 12
- UKIP 5
- Independent 2

== Results summary ==
2018 Basildon Borough Council election
Party	Seats	Gains	Losses	Net gain/loss	Seats %	Votes %	Votes	+/−
Conservative	10	5	0	▲5	66.7	51.3	18,468	▲17.5
Labour	3	2	0	▲3	20.0	23.0	8,265	▲1.1
Independent	2	0	0	0	13.3	7.2	3,891	▲7.1
UKIP	0	0	10	▼8	0.0	7.2	2,596	▼32.0

All comparisons in vote share are to the corresponding 2014 election.

== Ward results ==
=== Billericay East ===
Location of Billericay East ward

Billericay East
Party	Candidate	Votes	%	±%
Conservative	Andrew Schrader	2,584	77.7	
Labour	Thomas Scanlan	555	16.7	
UKIP	Susan McCaffery	186	5.6	
Majority		2,029	61.0	
Turnout		3,325	36	
Conservative hold		Swing		

=== Billericay West ===
Location of Billericay West ward

Billericay West
Party	Candidate	Votes	%	±%
Conservative	Anthony Hedley	2,677	80.5	
Labour	Malcolm Reid	528	15.9	
UKIP	Philip Gibbs	120	3.6	
Majority		2,149	64.6	
Turnout		3,325	35	
Conservative hold		Swing		

=== Burstead ===
Location of Burstead ward

Burstead
Party	Candidate	Votes	%	±%
Conservative	Andrew Baggott	2,881	83.0	
Labour	Santa Bennett	476	13.7	
UKIP	David Houghton	114	3.3	
Majority		2,405	69.2	
Turnout		3,471	40	
Conservative hold		Swing		

=== Crouch ===
Location of Crouch ward

Crouch ward
Party	Candidate	Votes	%	±%
Conservative	Terri Sargent	1,474	74.2	
Labour	Sally Muylders	372	18.7	
UKIP	Kevin Piper	141	7.1	
Majority		1,102	55.4	
Turnout		1,987	30	
Conservative hold		Swing		

=== Fryerns ===
Location of Fryerns ward

Fryerns
Party	Candidate	Votes	%	±%
Labour	David Kirkman	1,016	48.6	
Conservative	Christopher Allen	704	33.7	
UKIP	David Sheppard	370	17.7	
Majority		312	14.9	
Turnout		2,090	20	
Labour gain from UKIP		Swing		

=== Laindon Park ===
Location of Laindon Park ward

Laindon Park
Party	Candidate	Votes	%	±%
Conservative	Jeff Henry	1,013	43.7	
Labour	Clarence Zwengunde	857	37.0	
UKIP	Mark Conroy	448	19.3	
Majority		156	6.7	
Turnout		2,318	24	
Conservative gain from UKIP		Swing		

=== Langdon Hills ===
Location of Langdon Hills ward

Langdon Hills
Party	Candidate	Votes	%	±%
Independent	Imelda Clancy	1,349	52.6	
Conservative	Kevin Wingfield	721	28.1	
Labour	Alexander Harrison	356	13.9	
UKIP	Norma Saggers	139	5.4	
Majority		628	24.4	
Turnout		2565	37	
Independent gain from UKIP		Swing		

=== Lee Chapel North ===
Location of Lee Chapel North ward

Lee Chapel North
Party	Candidate	Votes	%	±%
Labour	Elaine McDonald	1,160	55.7	
Conservative	Spencer Warner	552	26.5	
UKIP	Frank Ferguson	369	17.7	
Majority		608	29.2	
Turnout		2,081	21	
Labour gain from UKIP		Swing		

=== Nethermayne ===
Location of Nethermayne ward

Nethermayne
Party	Candidate	Votes	%	±%
Independent	Kerry Smith	2,542	77.3	
Labour	Naomi Wallace	433	13.2	
Conservative	Sandeep Singh Sandhu	228	6.9	
UKIP	Simon Breedon	84	2.6	
Majority		2,189	64.1	
Turnout		3287	34	
Independent gain from UKIP		Swing		

=== Pitsea North West ===
Location of Pitsea North West ward

Pitsea North West
Party	Candidate	Votes	%	±%
Labour	Jack Ferguson	956	47.2	
Conservative	Yetunde Adeshile	655	32.3	
UKIP	Loren Hannon	342	16.9	
Democrats and Veterans Party	Steve Harvey	74	3.7	
Majority		301	14.9	
Turnout		2,027	22	
Labour gain from UKIP		Swing		

=== Pitsea South East ===
Location of Pitsea South East ward

Pitsea South East
Party	Candidate	Votes	%	±%
Conservative	Luke Mackenzie	1,165		
Conservative	Craig Rimmer	1,132		
Labour	Andrew Ansell	1,008		
Labour	Olukayode Adeniran	952		
UKIP	Richard Morris	283		
UKIP	Lorna Riches	243		
Democrats and Veterans Party	John Eacersall	101		
Turnout		4,884	28	
Conservative gain from UKIP		Swing		

=== Wickford Castledon ===
Location of Wickford Castleton ward

Wickford Castledon
Party	Candidate	Votes	%	±%
Conservative	Malcolm Buckley	1,191	58.5	
Wickford Independents	Alan Ball	566	27.8	
Labour	Louise Catling	278	13.7	
Majority		625	30.7	
Turnout		2,035	32	
Conservative gain from UKIP		Swing		

=== Wickford North ===
Location of Wickford North ward

Wickford North
Party	Candidate	Votes	%	±%
Conservative	Peter Holliman	1,682	57.2	
Wickford Independents	Eunice Brockman	1,256	42.8	
Majority		426	14.4	
Turnout		2,938	29	
Conservative gain from UKIP		Swing		

=== Wickford Park ===
Location of Wickford Park ward

Wickford Park
Party	Candidate	Votes	%	±%
Conservative	George Jeffery	941	48.0	
Wickford Independents	David Harrison	750	38.2	
Labour	Patricia Reid	270	13.8	
Majority		191	9.8	
Turnout		2,237	27	
Conservative gain from UKIP		Swing		
