= 2008 Basildon District Council election =

2008 UK local government election

← 2007	1 May 2008	2010 →

14 of the 42 seats to Basildon District Council 22 seats needed for a majority
	First party	Second party	Third party
Party	Conservative	Labour	Liberal Democrats
Seats before	28	11	3
Seats won	10	3	1
Seats after	29	10	3
Seat change	▲1	▼1	Steady
Popular vote	15,936	6,982	3,851
Percentage	47.5%	20.8%	11.5%
- Map of the results of the 2008 Basildon council election. Conservatives in blue, Labour in red and Liberal Democrats in yellow. Wards in grey were not contested in 2008.
Council control before election
Conservative Party
Council control after election
Conservative Party

The 2008 Basildon District Council election took place on 1 May 2008 to elect members of Basildon District Council in Essex, England. One third of the council was up for election and the Conservative Party stayed in overall control of the council.

After the election, the composition of the council was:

- Conservative 29
- Labour 10
- Liberal Democrats 3

== Candidates ==
The Conservative, Labour and British National parties stood in all 14 seats contested, which was an increase from 11 at the 2007 election for the British National Party. The Liberal Democrats stood in 13 wards, just not contesting Pitsea North West, while there were 4 United Kingdom Independence Party, 3 Green and 3 independent candidates. The independent candidates included councillor Jane Dyer in Vange, after she left the Labour party just before the election, and former councillor David Harrison in Wickford North.

== Election result ==
The results saw the Conservatives increase their majority by 1 after taking Vange ward to hold 29 seats. Conservative Luke Mackenzie became the youngest councillor in Basildon at the age of 22, after taking Vange from independent, formerly Labour, councillor Jane Dyer, who only received 72 votes in the election. Labour remained on 10 seats, with the party 82 votes behind the Conservatives in the contest in Vange. Meanwhile, the Liberal Democrats remained on 3 seats, but finished behind the British National Party in the share of the vote. Overall turnout in the election was 29%.

Following the election Lynda Gordon became the first female group leader on Basildon council, after taking over from Nigel Smith as leader of the Labour group. Smith had declared that he would step down as leader of the Labour group before the election.

2008 Basildon local election result
Party	Seats	Gains	Losses	Net gain/loss	Seats %	Votes %	Votes	+/−
Conservative	10	1	0	▲1	71.4	47.5	15,936	▲2.3
Labour	3	0	0	▼1	21.4	20.8	6,982	▼2.4
Liberal Democrats	1	0	0	Steady	7.1	11.5	3,851	▼7.5
BNP	0	0	0	Steady	0.0	14.1	4,743	▲5.9
Independent	0	0	1	Steady	0.0	3.3	1,093	▼2.9
UKIP	0	0	0	Steady	0.0	2.0	669	New
Green	0	0	0	Steady	0.0	0.8	266	▼0.7

All comparisons in vote share are to the corresponding 2004 election.

== Ward results ==
=== Billericay East ===
Location of Billericay East ward

Billericay East
Party	Candidate	Votes	%	±%
Conservative	Stuart Sullivan	1,932	65.8	+21.6
Liberal Democrats	Roger Hatch	428	14.6	−20.7
BNP	Geoffrey McCarthy	220	7.5	−4.6
Labour	Patricia Reid	206	7.0	−1.3
UKIP	Susan McCaffery	152	5.2	+5.2
Majority		1,504	51.2	+42.2
Turnout		2,938	32	−2
Conservative hold		Swing		

=== Billericay West ===
Location of Billericay West ward

Billericay West
Party	Candidate	Votes	%	±%
Conservative	Philip Turner	2,145	71.1	+5.4
Liberal Democrats	Belinda Jackson	332	11.0	−4.4
Labour	Wendy Aitken	239	7.9	+0.0
BNP	Michael Bateman	200	6.6	−4.4
UKIP	Cherry Young	99	3.3	+3.3
Majority		1,813	60.1	+9.8
Turnout		3,015	32	−1
Conservative hold		Swing		

=== Burstead ===
Location of Burstead ward

Burstead
Party	Candidate	Votes	%	±%
Conservative	Richard Moore	1,967	64.9	+2.0
BNP	Irene Bateman	407	13.4	+2.3
Liberal Democrats	Geoffrey Taylor	384	12.7	−2.5
Labour	Margaret Viney	275	9.1	−1.7
Majority		1,506	51.4	+3.7
Turnout		3,033	36	−0
Conservative hold		Swing		

=== Crouch ===
Location of Crouch ward

Crouch
Party	Candidate	Votes	%	±%
Conservative	Stuart Allen	1,311	68.5	+7.7
BNP	Carolyn Rossiter	251	13.1	−0.4
Labour	Anthony Borlase	218	11.4	+0.9
Liberal Democrats	Jennifer Cole	135	7.0	+0.4
Majority		1,060	55.4	+8.1
Turnout		1,915	30	−6
Conservative hold		Swing		

=== Fryerns ===
Location of Fryerns ward

Fryerns
Party	Candidate	Votes	%	±%
Labour	Paul Kirkman	1,013	40.1	−2.0
Conservative	Jim Devlin	636	25.2	+2.0
BNP	Leonard Heather	628	24.9	+2.0
Liberal Democrats	John Lutton	250	9.9	−1.9
Majority		377	14.9	−3.9
Turnout		2,527	27	−1
Labour hold		Swing		

=== Laindon Park ===
Location of Laindon Park ward

Laindon Park
Party	Candidate	Votes	%	±%
Conservative	Frank Tomlin	1,020	45.1	+11.8
Labour	David Kirkman	661	29.2	+4.7
BNP	David King	387	17.1	+5.5
Liberal Democrats	Jonathan Myall	193	8.5	+4.9
Majority		359	15.9	+7.0
Turnout		2,261	27	−4
Conservative hold		Swing		

=== Langdon Hills ===
Location of Langdon Hills ward

Langdon Hills
Party	Candidate	Votes	%	±%
Conservative	Stephen Hillier	1,176	57.6	−5.0
Labour	William Archibald	283	13.9	−2.5
BNP	Kevin Swaby	197	9.6	+9.6
UKIP	Imelda Clancy	152	7.4	+7.4
Liberal Democrats	Emma Peall	130	6.4	−4.7
Green	Annie Humphries	104	5.1	−4.8
Majority		893	43.7	−2.5
Turnout		2,042	30	−5
Conservative hold		Swing		

=== Lee Chapel North ===
Lee Chapel North ward in Basildon 2002

Lee Chapel North
Party	Candidate	Votes	%	±%
Labour	Lynda Gordon	972	43.8	+4.3
Conservative	Mark Coxshall	604	27.2	−1.1
BNP	Jay Slaven	358	16.1	−0.2
Liberal Democrats	Stephen Nice	160	7.2	−2.6
Green	Ernest Humphries	126	5.7	−0.3
Majority		368	16.6	+5.4
Turnout		2,220	25	−0
Labour hold		Swing		

=== Nethermayne ===
Location of Nethermayne ward

Nethermayne
Party	Candidate	Votes	%	±%
Liberal Democrats	Geoff Williams	1,247	43.0	−8.0
Conservative	Kerry Whitaker	697	24.1	−6.6
Labour	Mark Witzer	495	17.1	−1.2
BNP	Mark Henry	459	15.8	+15.8
Majority		550	19.0	−1.3
Turnout		2,898	33	+0
Liberal Democrats hold		Swing		

=== Pitsea North West ===
Location of Pitsea North West ward

Pitsea North West
Party	Candidate	Votes	%	±%
Conservative	Andrew Baggott	945	40.7	+7.3
Labour	Emma Collins	739	31.9	−2.4
BNP	Raymond Pearce	370	15.9	−1.0
UKIP	Terry McBride	266	11.5	+3.7
Majority		205	8.9	
Turnout		2,320	25	+2
Conservative hold		Swing		

=== Pitsea South East ===
Location of Pitsea South East ward

Pitsea South East
Party	Candidate	Votes	%	±%
Conservative	Ann Blake	1,255	52.0	+5.3
Labour	Richard Llewellyn	604	25.0	−6.1
BNP	Sidney Chaney	383	15.9	+0.7
Liberal Democrats	Vivien Howard	171	7.1	+7.1
Majority		651	27.0	+11.4
Turnout		2,413	27	−1
Conservative hold		Swing		

=== St Martin's ===
Location of St Martin's ward

St Martin's
Party	Candidate	Votes	%	±%
Labour	Philip Rackley	539	38.1	−3.2
Conservative	Gwen Ball	408	28.8	+5.9
BNP	Philip Howell	305	21.6	+0.1
Liberal Democrats	Michael Dickinson	163	11.5	+0.9
Majority		131	9.3	−9.1
Turnout		1,415	24	−3
Labour hold		Swing		

=== Vange ===
Location of Vange ward

Vange
Party	Candidate	Votes	%	±%
Conservative	Luke MacKenzie	590	35.8	+0.9
Labour	Santa Bennett	508	30.9	−7.8
BNP	Rodney Leveridge	289	17.6	−8.8
Liberal Democrats	Philip Jenkins	104	6.3	+6.3
Independent	Jane Dyer	72	4.4	+4.4
Independent	David Aitken	47	2.9	+2.9
Green	Dean Hall	36	2.2	+2.2
Majority		82	5.0	
Turnout		1,646	24	−4
Conservative gain from Independent		Swing		

=== Wickford North ===
Location of Wickford North ward

Wickford North
Party	Candidate	Votes	%	±%
Conservative	Carole Morris	1,250	43.1	−9.6
Independent	David Harrison	974	33.6	−0.2
BNP	Anthony Gladwin	289	10.0	+10.0
Labour	Christopher Wilson	230	7.9	−5.6
Liberal Democrats	Michael Woods	154	5.3	+5.3
Majority		276	9.5	−9.4
Turnout		2,897	31	−2
Conservative hold		Swing		
