= 2010 Basildon District Council election =

2010 UK local government election

- 6 May 2010

14 of the 42 seats to Basildon District Council 22 seats needed for a majority
| | First party | Second party | Third party |
|---|---|---|---|
| Party | Conservative | Labour | Liberal Democrats |
| Seats before | 29 | 10 | 3 |
| Seats won | 11 | 2 | 1 |
| Seats after | 29 | 10 | 3 |
| Seat change | Steady | Steady | Steady |
| Popular vote | 36,551 | 15,766 | 13,465 |
| Percentage | 49.6% | 21.4% | 18.3% |
- Map of the results of the 2010 Basildon council election. Conservatives in blue, Labour in red and Liberal Democrats in yellow. Wards in grey were not contested in 2010.
Council control before election
Conservative Party
Council control after election
Conservative Party

The 2010 Basildon District Council election took place on 6 May 2010 to elect members of Basildon District Council in Essex, England. One third of the council was up for election and the Conservative Party stayed in overall control of the council.

After the election, the composition of the council was:

- Conservative 29
- Labour 10
- Liberal Democrats 3

== Election result ==
The results saw the Conservatives retain control of the council after winning half of the votes cast. This enabled them to win 11 seats, compared to two for Labour and one for the Liberal Democrats. With the election having taken place at the same time as the general election, turnout was 64%, a rise from the 29% recorded at the 2008 election.

2010 Basildon local election result
| Party | Seats | Gains | Losses | Net gain/loss | Seats % | Votes % | Votes | +/− |
|---|---|---|---|---|---|---|---|---|
| Conservative | 11 | 0 | 0 | Steady | 78.6 | 49.6 | 36,551 | ▼4.8 |
| Labour | 2 | 0 | 0 | Steady | 14.3 | 21.4 | 15,766 | ▼1.5 |
| Liberal Democrats | 1 | 0 | 0 | Steady | 7.1 | 18.3 | 13,465 | ▲5.3 |
| BNP | 0 | 0 | 0 | Steady | 0.0 | 7.2 | 5,308 | ▲0.5 |
| UKIP | 0 | 0 | 0 | Steady | 0.0 | 3.5 | 2,587 | New |

All comparisons in vote share are to the corresponding 2006 election.

== Ward results ==
=== Billericay East ===
Location of Billericay East ward

Billericay East
| Party | Candidate | Votes | % | ±% |
|---|---|---|---|---|
| Conservative | Anthony Archer | 4,084 | 61.1 | −4.7 |
| Liberal Democrats | Nigel Horn | 1,360 | 20.3 | +5.7 |
| Labour | Patricia Reid | 737 | 11.0 | +4.0 |
| UKIP | Susan McCaffery | 308 | 4.6 | −0.6 |
| BNP | Geoffrey McCarthy | 196 | 2.9 | −4.6 |
| Majority | | 2,724 | 40.7 | −10.5 |
| Turnout | | 6,685 | 74 | +42 |
| Conservative hold | | Swing | | |

=== Billericay West ===
Location of Billericay West ward

Billericay West
| Party | Candidate | Votes | % | ±% |
|---|---|---|---|---|
| Conservative | Anthony Hedley | 4,287 | 63.2 | −7.9 |
| Liberal Democrats | Peter Fisher | 1,262 | 18.6 | +7.6 |
| Labour | Wendy Aitken | 768 | 11.3 | +3.4 |
| UKIP | Cherry Young | 246 | 3.6 | +0.3 |
| BNP | Michael Bateman | 219 | 3.2 | −3.4 |
| Majority | | 3,025 | 44.6 | −15.5 |
| Turnout | | 6,782 | 73 | +41 |
| Conservative hold | | Swing | | |

=== Burstead ===
Location of Burstead ward

Burstead
| Party | Candidate | Votes | % | ±% |
|---|---|---|---|---|
| Conservative | Paul Arnold | 3,579 | 58.3 | −6.6 |
| Liberal Democrats | Stewart Goshawk | 1,028 | 16.7 | +4.0 |
| Labour | Margaret Viney | 707 | 11.5 | +2.4 |
| UKIP | Terry Gandy | 575 | 9.4 | +9.4 |
| BNP | Irene Bateman | 251 | 4.1 | −9.3 |
| Majority | | 2,551 | 41.5 | −9.9 |
| Turnout | | 6,140 | 73 | +37 |
| Conservative hold | | Swing | | |

=== Crouch ===
Location of Crouch ward

Crouch
| Party | Candidate | Votes | % | ±% |
|---|---|---|---|---|
| Conservative | Terri Sargent | 2,660 | 62.4 | −6.1 |
| Labour | Sarah Davies | 669 | 15.7 | +4.3 |
| Liberal Democrats | Geoffrey Taylor | 590 | 13.8 | +6.8 |
| BNP | Anthony Gladwin | 344 | 8.1 | −5.0 |
| Majority | | 1,991 | 46.7 | −8.7 |
| Turnout | | 4,263 | 67 | +37 |
| Conservative hold | | Swing | | |

=== Fryerns ===
Location of Fryerns ward

Fryerns
| Party | Candidate | Votes | % | ±% |
|---|---|---|---|---|
| Labour | William Archibald | 1,880 | 36.6 | −3.5 |
| Conservative | Hayley Rogers | 1,585 | 30.8 | +5.6 |
| Liberal Democrats | Arnold Lutton | 822 | 16.0 | +6.1 |
| BNP | Leonard Heather | 579 | 11.3 | −13.6 |
| UKIP | David Sheppard | 276 | 5.4 | +5.4 |
| Majority | | 295 | 5.7 | −9.2 |
| Turnout | | 5,142 | 56 | +29 |
| Labour hold | | Swing | | |

=== Laindon Park ===
Location of Laindon Park ward

Laindon Park
| Party | Candidate | Votes | % | ±% |
|---|---|---|---|---|
| Conservative | John Dornan | 2,135 | 43.1 | −2.0 |
| Labour | Trevor Wahlen | 1,497 | 30.2 | +1.0 |
| Liberal Democrats | Philip Jenkins | 830 | 16.8 | +8.3 |
| BNP | Tony Parry | 488 | 9.9 | −7.2 |
| Majority | | 638 | 12.9 | −3.0 |
| Turnout | | 4,950 | 59 | +32 |
| Conservative hold | | Swing | | |

=== Langdon Hills ===
Location of Langdon Hills ward

Langdon Hills
| Party | Candidate | Votes | % | ±% |
|---|---|---|---|---|
| Conservative | Sandra Hillier | 2,594 | 54.1 | −3.5 |
| Labour | Thomas Kirkman | 875 | 18.3 | +4.4 |
| Liberal Democrats | Elizabeth Grant | 769 | 16.0 | +9.6 |
| UKIP | Imelda Clancy | 307 | 6.4 | −1.0 |
| BNP | Thomas Beaney | 248 | 5.2 | −4.4 |
| Majority | | 1,719 | 35.9 | −7.8 |
| Turnout | | 4,793 | 70 | +40 |
| Conservative hold | | Swing | | |

=== Lee Chapel North ===
Lee Chapel North ward in Basildon 2002

Lee Chapel North
| Party | Candidate | Votes | % | ±% |
|---|---|---|---|---|
| Labour | Alan Bennett | 1,818 | 37.4 | −6.4 |
| Conservative | Sam Browne | 1,649 | 33.9 | +6.7 |
| Liberal Democrats | Stephen Nice | 855 | 17.6 | +10.4 |
| BNP | Philip Howell | 536 | 11.0 | −5.1 |
| Majority | | 169 | 3.5 | −13.1 |
| Turnout | | 4,858 | 56 | +31 |
| Labour hold | | Swing | | |

=== Nethermayne ===
Location of Nethermayne ward

Nethermayne
| Party | Candidate | Votes | % | ±% |
|---|---|---|---|---|
| Liberal Democrats | Linda Williams | 2,017 | 36.4 | −6.6 |
| Conservative | Stephen Foster | 1,727 | 31.2 | +7.1 |
| Labour | Hyman Witzer | 1,312 | 23.7 | +6.6 |
| BNP | Carolyn Rossiter | 487 | 8.8 | −7.0 |
| Majority | | 290 | 5.2 | −13.8 |
| Turnout | | 5,543 | 63 | +30 |
| Liberal Democrats hold | | Swing | | |

=== Pitsea North West ===
Location of Pitsea North West ward

Pitsea North West
| Party | Candidate | Votes | % | ±% |
|---|---|---|---|---|
| Conservative | Ron Livesey | 1,654 | 34.1 | −6.6 |
| Labour | David Kirkman | 1,508 | 31.1 | −0.8 |
| Liberal Democrats | Martin Howard | 770 | 15.9 | +15.9 |
| BNP | Raymond Pearce | 460 | 9.5 | −6.4 |
| UKIP | Terry McBride | 453 | 9.3 | −2.2 |
| Majority | | 146 | 3.0 | −5.9 |
| Turnout | | 4,845 | 53 | +28 |
| Conservative hold | | Swing | | |

=== Pitsea South East ===
Location of Pitsea South East ward

Pitsea South East
| Party | Candidate | Votes | % | ±% |
|---|---|---|---|---|
| Conservative | David Abrahall | 1,973 | 39.7 | −12.3 |
| Labour | Daniel Blaney | 1,577 | 31.8 | +6.8 |
| Liberal Democrats | Vivien Howard | 576 | 11.6 | +4.5 |
| UKIP | Kerry Smith | 422 | 8.5 | +8.5 |
| BNP | Kevin Swaby | 417 | 8.4 | −7.5 |
| Majority | | 396 | 8.0 | −19.0 |
| Turnout | | 4,965 | 58 | +31 |
| Conservative hold | | Swing | | |

=== Wickford Castledon ===
Location of Wickford Castleton ward

Wickford Castledon
| Party | Candidate | Votes | % | ±% |
|---|---|---|---|---|
| Conservative | Malcolm Buckley | 2,495 | 59.3 | +12.0 |
| Labour | Alwyn Birch | 728 | 17.3 | +7.1 |
| Liberal Democrats | Emma Peall | 711 | 16.9 | +16.9 |
| BNP | Michael Keeble | 273 | 6.5 | −5.7 |
| Majority | | 1,767 | 42.0 | +25.0 |
| Turnout | | 4,207 | 69 | +32 |
| Conservative hold | | Swing | | |

=== Wickford North ===
Location of Wickford North ward

Wickford North
| Party | Candidate | Votes | % | ±% |
|---|---|---|---|---|
| Conservative | Tony Ball | 3,580 | 58.1 | +15.0 |
| Liberal Democrats | Richard Stokkereit | 1,073 | 17.4 | +12.1 |
| Labour | Santa Bennett | 1,013 | 16.4 | +8.5 |
| BNP | David King | 497 | 8.1 | −1.9 |
| Majority | | 2,507 | 40.7 | +31.2 |
| Turnout | | 6,163 | 66 | +35 |
| Conservative hold | | Swing | | |

=== Wickford Park ===
Location of Wickford Park ward

Wickford Park
| Party | Candidate | Votes | % | ±% |
|---|---|---|---|---|
| Conservative | Donald Morris | 2,549 | 58.7 | −6.0 |
| Liberal Democrats | Michael Woods | 802 | 18.5 | +18.5 |
| Labour | Colin Payn | 677 | 15.6 | +0.9 |
| BNP | Paul Maylin | 313 | 7.2 | +7.2 |
| Majority | | 1,747 | 40.2 | −3.8 |
| Turnout | | 4,341 | 64 | +39 |
| Conservative hold | | Swing | | |
