= 2006 Basildon District Council election =

2006 UK local government election

← 2004	4 May 2006	2007 →

14 of the 42 seats to Basildon District Council 22 seats needed for a majority
	First party	Second party	Third party
Party	Conservative	Labour	Liberal Democrats
Last election	25	14	3
Seats before	24	15	3
Seats won	11	2	1
Seats after	27	12	3
Seat change	▲3	▼3	Steady
Popular vote	20,654	8,684	4,944
Percentage	54.4%	22.9%	13.0%
- Map of the results of the 2006 Basildon council election. Conservatives in blue, Labour in red and Liberal Democrats in yellow. Wards in grey were not contested in 2006.
Council control before election
Conservative Party
Council control after election
Conservative Party

The 2006 Basildon District Council election took place on 4 May 2006 to elect members of Basildon District Council in Essex, England. One third of the council was up for election and the Conservative party stayed in overall control of the council.

After the election, the composition of the council was

- Conservative 27
- Labour 12
- Liberal Democrats 3

== Election result ==
The results saw the Conservative party increase their majority to 12 seats after gaining 3 seats from Labour. The Conservatives gains came in the wards of Laindon Park, Pitsea North West and Pitsea South East enabling the party to win 11 of the 14 seats contested. Overall turnout in the election was 33.5%.

2006 Basildon local election result
Party	Seats	Gains	Losses	Net gain/loss	Seats %	Votes %	Votes	+/−
Conservative	11	3	0	▲3	78.6	54.4	20,654	
Labour	2	0	3	▼3	14.3	22.9	8,684	
Liberal Democrats	1	0	0	0	7.1	13.0	4,944	
BNP	0	0	0	0	0	6.7	2,553	
Independent	0	0	0	0	0	1.5	553	
Green	0	0	0	0	0	1.0	381	
English Democrat	0	0	0	0	0	0.5	198	

== Ward results ==
=== Billericay East ===
Location of Billericay East ward

Billericay East
Party	Candidate	Votes	%	±%
Conservative	Anthony Archer	2,486	72.5	+6.6
Liberal Democrats	John James	638	18.6	−5.3
Labour	Patricia Reid	307	8.9	−1.3
Majority		1,848	53.9	+11.9
Turnout		3,431	38.1	+1.5
Conservative hold		Swing		

=== Billericay West ===
Location of Billericay West ward

Billericay West
Party	Candidate	Votes	%	±%
Conservative	Anthony Hedley	2,172	64.1	−3.8
Liberal Democrats	Geoffrey Taylor	511	15.1	−8.7
BNP	Michael Bateman	438	12.9	+12.9
Labour	Wendy Aitken	265	7.8	−0.5
Majority		1,661	49.1	+5.0
Turnout		3,386	36.2	−1.1
Conservative hold		Swing		

=== Burstead ===
Location of Burstead ward

Burstead
Party	Candidate	Votes	%	±%
Conservative	Geoffrey Buckenham	2,305	69.8	+8.1
Liberal Democrats	Susan Haeger	648	19.6	−7.1
Labour	Margaret Viney	350	10.6	−1.0
Majority		1,657	50.2	+15.2
Turnout		3,303	40.0	+2.8
Conservative hold		Swing		

=== Crouch ===
Location of Crouch ward

Crouch
Party	Candidate	Votes	%	±%
Conservative	Terri Sargent	1,394	60.8	+6.7
BNP	Geoffrey McCarthy	310	13.5	+13.5
Labour	Anthony Borlase	240	10.5	−2.6
English Democrat	Kim Gandy	198	8.6	−11.7
Liberal Democrats	Jonathan Myall	152	6.6	−6.0
Majority		1,084	47.3	+13.5
Turnout		2,294	36.5	+2.4
Conservative hold		Swing		

=== Fryerns ===
Location of Fryerns ward

Fryerns
Party	Candidate	Votes	%	±%
Labour	Janet Payn	1,258	43.7	+3.5
BNP	Leonard Heather	727	25.3	+3.7
Conservative	Mark Coker	548	19.0	−2.0
Liberal Democrats	John Lutton	344	12.0	+1.4
Majority		531	18.5	−0.1
Turnout		2,877	31.6	+1.6
Labour hold		Swing		

=== Laindon Park ===
Location of Laindon Park ward

Laindon Park
Party	Candidate	Votes	%	±%
Conservative	John Dornan	1,173	44.5	+9.6
Labour	Barbara Croft	944	35.8	+7.5
BNP	Matthew Single	518	19.7	−0.5
Majority		229	8.7	+2.2
Turnout		2,635	31.5	+1.5
Conservative gain from Labour		Swing		

=== Langdon Hills ===
Location of Langdon Hills ward

Langdon Hills
Party	Candidate	Votes	%	±%
Conservative	Sandra Hillier	1,439	62.6	+8.1
Labour	William Archibald	377	16.4	−4.0
Liberal Democrats	Philip Jenkins	255	11.1	−3.0
Green	Annie Humphries	228	9.9	−1.0
Majority		1,062	46.2	+12.1
Turnout		2,299	35.1	+1.3
Conservative hold		Swing		

=== Lee Chapel North ===
Lee Chapel North ward in Basildon 2002

Lee Chapel North
Party	Candidate	Votes	%	±%
Labour	Nigel Smith	1,009	39.7	+1.1
Conservative	Esther Phillips	610	24.0	+0.6
BNP	Philip Howell	560	22.0	+1.9
Liberal Democrats	Stephen Nice	212	8.3	−1.8
Green	Ernest Humphries	153	6.0	+0.4
Majority		399	15.7	+0.5
Turnout		2,544	30.0	+0.2
Labour hold		Swing		

=== Nethermayne ===
Location of Nethermayne ward

Nethermayne
Party	Candidate	Votes	%	±%
Liberal Democrats	Linda Williams	1,268	42.0	−3.5
Conservative	Henry Tucker	1,027	34.0	+3.4
Labour	Michael Bushell	726	24.0	+0.1
Majority		241	8.0	−6.9
Turnout		3,021	35.0	−2.2
Liberal Democrats hold		Swing		

=== Pitsea North West ===
Location of Pitsea North West ward

Pitsea North West
Party	Candidate	Votes	%	±%
Conservative	Ronald Livesey	1,014	44.4	+4.2
Labour	Keith Bobbin	882	38.6	+0.8
Liberal Democrats	Martin Howard	388	17.0	−5.0
Majority		132	5.8	+3.4
Turnout		2,284	25.2	+1.9
Conservative gain from Labour		Swing		

=== Pitsea South East ===
Location of Pitsea South East ward

Pitsea South East
Party	Candidate	Votes	%	±%
Conservative	David Abrahall	1,579	59.1	+15.1
Labour	Emma Collins	1,095	40.9	+14.4
Majority		484	18.1	+0.6
Turnout		2,674	30.8	+0.0
Conservative gain from Labour		Swing		

=== Wickford Castledon ===
Location of Wickford Castleton ward

Wickford Castledon
Party	Candidate	Votes	%	±%
Conservative	Malcolm Buckley	1,291	56.2	−11.9
Independent	Alan Ball	553	24.1	+24.1
Labour	Leonard Wilkins	269	11.7	−4.6
Liberal Democrats	Vivien Howard	186	8.1	−7.5
Majority		738	32.1	−19.7
Turnout		2,299	38.0	
Conservative hold		Swing		

=== Wickford North ===
Location of Wickford North ward

Wickford North
Party	Candidate	Votes	%	±%
Conservative	Anthony Ball	2,335	76.6	+19.9
Labour	Christopher Wilson	712	23.4	+8.8
Majority		1,623	53.3	+11.9
Turnout		3,047	34.0	−0.9
Conservative hold		Swing		

=== Wickford Park ===
Location of Wickford Park ward

Wickford Park
Party	Candidate	Votes	%	±%
Conservative	Donald Morris	1,281	68.4	+8.3
Liberal Democrats	Michael Woods	342	18.3	+2.1
Labour	Daniel Blaney	250	13.3	−10.4
Majority		939	50.1	+13.7
Turnout		1,873	27.7	
Conservative hold		Swing		
