= 2021 Basildon Borough Council election =

UK local election

- 6 May 2021

14 of the 42 seats to Basildon Borough Council 22 seats needed for a majority
	First party	Second party	Third party
Party	Conservative	Labour	Independent
Seats before	18	14	7
Seats won	10	3	2
Seats after	22	12	6
Seat change	▲4	▼2	▼1
	Fourth party
Party	UKIP
Seats before	1
Seats won	0
Seats after	0
Seat change	▼1
- Map showing the results of contested wards in the 2021 Basildon Borough Council elections.
Council control before election
No overall control
Council control after election
Conservative

The 2021 Basildon Borough Council election took place on 6 May 2021 to elect members of Basildon Borough Council in Essex. This was on the same day as other local elections. The Conservative Party regained control of the council from no overall control.

== Results summary ==
2021 Basildon Borough Council election
Party	This election			Full council			This election		
Party	Seats	Net	Seats %	Other	Total	Total %	Votes	Votes %	+/−
Conservative	10	▲4	66.7	12	22	52.4	19,155	48.7	+5.6
Labour	3	▼2	20.0	9	12	28.6	8,991	22.9	-1.5
Independent	2	▼1	13.3	4	6	14.3	3,918	10.0	-0.7
Wickford Independents	0	Steady	0.0	2	2	4.8	1,035	2.6	-7.9
Liberal Democrats	0	Steady	0.0	0	0	0.0	3,526	9.0	-0.4
BCRP	0	Steady	0.0	0	0	0.0	1,971	5.0	New
Reform	0	Steady	0.0	0	0	0.0	534	1.4	New
UKIP	0	▼1	0.0	0	0	0.0	153	0.4	New
For Britain	0	Steady	0.0	0	0	0.0	57	0.1	±0.0

== Ward results ==
BCRP = Basildon Community Residents Party

=== Billericay East ===
Billericay East
Party	Candidate	Votes	%	±%
Conservative	Stuart Sullivan	2,412	69.9	+5.8
Labour	Tracey Hilton	585	17.0	+9.2
Liberal Democrats	Karen Manterfield	364	10.6	+2.6
UKIP	Susan McCaffery	88	2.6	N/A
Majority		1,827	52.9	+8.9
Turnout		3,449	36.3	+4.3
Conservative hold		Swing	▼1.7	

=== Billericay West ===
Billericay West
Party	Candidate	Votes	%	±%
Conservative	Philip Turner	1,885	50.0	−2.5
Liberal Democrats	Edward Sainsbury	1,687	44.7	+5.3
Labour	David Goddard	199	5.3	−2.8
Majority		198	5.3	−7.8
Turnout		3,771	39.8	+4.8
Conservative hold		Swing	▼3.9	

=== Burstead ===
Burstead
Party	Candidate	Votes	%	±%
Conservative	Richard Moore	2,394	75.9	−7.0
Labour	Malcolm Reid	397	12.6	−4.5
Liberal Democrats	Laura Clark	362	11.5	N/A
Majority		1,997	63.3	−2.4
Turnout		3,153	35.8	+2.8
Conservative hold		Swing	▼1.8	

=== Crouch ===
Crouch
Party	Candidate	Votes	%	±%
Conservative	Stuart Allen	1,428	71.5	−2.7
Labour	Mark Burton-Sampson	312	15.6	−3.1
Liberal Democrats	Simon Blake	100	5.0	N/A
Independent	Sean Barlow	90	4.5	N/A
Reform	Neil Huntley	67	3.4	N/A
Majority		1,116	55.9	+0.5
Turnout		1,997	29.4	−0.6
Conservative hold		Swing	▲0.2	

=== Fryerns ===
Fryerns
Party	Candidate	Votes	%	±%
Labour	Adele Brown	974	41.0	−14.3
Conservative	Sandeep Sandhu	786	33.1	+3.2
BCRP	Jim Howard	337	14.2	N/A
Reform	Max Woodrow	210	8.8	N/A
Liberal Democrats	Viv Howard	66	2.8	−12.0
Majority		188	7.9	−17.5
Turnout		2,373	22.4	+3.4
Labour hold		Swing	▼5.6	

=== Laindon Park ===
Laindon Park
Party	Candidate	Votes	%	±%
Conservative	Kevin Wingfield	1,545	54.6	+21.5
Labour	Angela Stanbrook	765	27.0	−8.5
Independent	Tony Low	155	5.5	−25.5
BCRP	Mark Dale	144	5.1	N/A
Liberal Democrats	Stephen McCarthy	100	3.5	N/A
UKIP	Fred Southgate	65	2.3	N/A
For Britain	Christopher Bateman	57	2.0	N/A
Majority		780	27.6	+25.1
Turnout		2,831	28.2	+5.2
Conservative gain from UKIP		Swing	▲15.0	

=== Langdon Hills ===
Langdon Hills
Party	Candidate	Votes	%
Independent	Val Robbins	1,023	37.9
Conservative	Christopher Allen	949	35.2
Conservative	Charles Sansom	840	31.1
Independent	Walt Brown	732	27.1
Independent	Derrick Fellowes	363	13.4
Labour	Clarence Zwengunde	276	10.2
Liberal Democrats	Timothy Nicklin	248	9.2
Independent	None of the Above X	46	1.7
Turnout		2,699	38.4
Independent hold			
Conservative hold			

=== Lee Chapel North ===
Lee Chapel North
Party	Candidate	Votes	%	±%
Labour	Alex Harrison	966	39.0	−13.6
Conservative	Deepak Shukla	921	37.2	+10.8
BCRP	Kay Quested	354	14.3	N/A
Reform	Lewis Fripp	123	5.0	N/A
Liberal Democrats	Michael Chandler	113	4.6	−16.4
Majority		45	1.8	−24.4
Turnout		2,477	24.2	+7.2
Labour hold		Swing	▼12.2	

=== Nethermayne ===
Nethermayne
Party	Candidate	Votes	%	±%
Independent	Hazel Green	1,448	45.7	N/A
Conservative	Mark Cottrell	646	20.4	+13.3
Labour	Michael Baker	527	16.6	+4.7
BCRP	Lauren Whitwell	394	12.4	N/A
Liberal Democrats	Stephen Nice	113	3.6	+0.3
Reform	Norma Saggers	39	1.2	N/A
Majority		802	25.3	−35.9
Turnout		3,167	30.6	+0.6
Independent gain from UKIP		Swing		

=== Pitsea North West ===
Pitsea North West
Party	Candidate	Votes	%	±%
Labour	Gavin Callaghan	1,101	46.6	−1.8
Conservative	Stuart Terson	987	41.8	+3.7
BCRP	Jake Hogg	213	9.0	N/A
Liberal Democrats	Martin Howard	63	2.7	−10.8
Majority		114	4.8	−5.5
Turnout		2,364	25.0	+5.0
Labour hold		Swing	▼2.8	

=== Pitsea South East ===
Pitsea South East
Party	Candidate	Votes	%	±%
Conservative	Gary Canham	1,305	47.1	−4.9
Labour	Andrew Ansell	1,238	44.7	+5.4
Reform	Daniel Tooley	95	3.4	N/A
Liberal Democrats	Peter Lancaster	73	2.6	−6.1
Independent	Simon Breedon	61	2.2	N/A
Majority		67	2.4	−10.3
Turnout		2,772	29.9	+3.9
Conservative gain from UKIP		Swing	▼5.2	

=== St. Martin's ===
St. Martin's
Party	Candidate	Votes	%	±%
Conservative	Davida Ademuyiwa	697	39.5	+4.8
Labour	David Burton-Sampson	675	38.3	−9.1
BCRP	Patricia Rackley	309	17.5	N/A
Liberal Democrats	Philip Jenkins	83	4.7	−13.2
Majority		22	1.2	—
Turnout		1,764	25.2	+4.2
Conservative gain from Labour		Swing	▲7.0	

=== Vange ===
Vange
Party	Candidate	Votes	%	±%
Conservative	Yetunde Adeshile	749	44.9	+12.3
Labour	Aidan McGurran	648	38.9	−4.9
BCRP	Phil Rackley	220	13.2	N/A
Liberal Democrats	Peter Smith	50	3.0	N/A
Majority		101	6.0	—
Turnout		1,667	23.5	+4.5
Conservative gain from Labour		Swing	▲8.6	

=== Wickford North ===
Wickford North
Party	Candidate	Votes	%	±%
Conservative	Carole Morris	1,611	52.3	+9.7
Wickford Ind.	Alan Ball	1,035	33.6	−11.3
Labour	Gillian Palmer	328	10.7	−1.8
Liberal Democrats	Nicola Hoad	104	3.4	N/A
Majority		576	18.7	—
Turnout		3,078	29.5	+2.5
Conservative hold		Swing	▲10.5	

== By-elections ==
=== Pitsea North West ===
Pitsea North West: 29 July 2021
Party	Candidate	Votes	%	±%
Conservative	Stuart Terson	794	56.5	+14.7
Labour	Aidan McGurran	430	30.6	−16.0
BCRP	Jake Hogg	82	5.8	−3.2
Liberal Democrats	Martin Howard	57	4.1	+1.4
Reform	Daniel Tooley	23	1.6	New
For Britain	Christopher Bateman	19	1.4	New
Rejected ballots		6	0.4	
Majority		364	25.9	N/A
Turnout		1,415	14.9	−10.1
Conservative gain from Labour		Swing	▲15.4	

The Pitsea North West by-election was triggered by the resignation of Labour councillor Gavin Callaghan.

=== Lee Chapel North ===
Lee Chapel North: 25 November 2021
Party	Candidate	Votes	%	±%
Labour	Terry Webb	451	39.8	+0.8
Conservative	Deepak Shukla	395	34.8	−2.4
BCRP	Kay Quested	135	11.9	−2.4
Reform	Frank Ferguson	98	8.6	+3.7
Liberal Democrats	Michael Chandler	55	4.8	+0.3
Rejected ballots		2	0.2	
Majority		56	5.0	+3.2
Turnout		1,136	11.2	−13.0
Labour hold		Swing	▲1.6	

The Lee Chapel North by-election was triggered by the resignation of councillor Kayode Adeniran.
