= 2007 Basildon District Council election =

2007 UK local government election

| ← 2006 | 3 May 2007 | 2008 → |

14 of the 42 seats to Basildon District Council 22 seats needed for a majority
| | First party | Second party | Third party |
|---|---|---|---|
| Party | Conservative | Labour | Liberal Democrats |
| Seats before | 27 | 12 | 3 |
| Seats won | 8 | 5 | 1 |
| Seats after | 28 | 11 | 3 |
| Seat change | ▲1 | ▼1 | Steady |
| Popular vote | 14,823 | 7,656 | 4,411 |
| Percentage | 43.2% | 22.3% | 12.9% |
- Map of the results of the 2007 Basildon council election. Conservatives in blue, Labour in red and Liberal Democrats in yellow. Wards in grey were not contested in 2007.
Council control before election
Conservative Party
Council control after election
Conservative Party

The 2007 Basildon District Council election took place on 3 May 2007 to elect members of Basildon District Council in Essex, England. One third of the council was up for election and the Conservative Party stayed in overall control of the council.

After the election, the composition of the council was:

- Conservative 28
- Labour 11
- Liberal Democrats 3

== Campaign ==
The election saw the British National Party stand in 11 of the 14 wards being contested, an increase from 6 in 2006 and more than the Liberal Democrats who only stood in 9 seats.

There was controversy during the election over comments by the Conservative candidate in Vange, Luke Mackenzie, in an election leaflet where he called for voters who did not want asylum seekers to get council houses to vote Conservative. Other parties called on the Conservatives to disown Mackenzie, who was standing against the only ethnic minority councillor in Basildon, saying he was "peddling scare stories" and that the comments were "inflammatory". However Mackenzie denied increasing racial tension, saying voters felt immigration was "entirely out of control" and that a shortage of housing was caused by people from outside of Basildon, and was defended by the leaders of the Conservative group in Basildon.

== Election result ==
The results saw the Conservative hold control of the council after gaining one seat from Labour. The Conservatives took Laindon Park, but narrowly failed to take the targeted wards of Pitsea North West and Vange from Labour, by 19 and 68 votes respectively. The Conservative share of the vote was down on the 2006 election at 43%, while Labour won 22%. Overall turnout in the election was 30%, a decline from the 33.5% recorded in 2006.

2007 Basildon local election result
| Party | Seats | Gains | Losses | Net gain/loss | Seats % | Votes % | Votes | +/− |
|---|---|---|---|---|---|---|---|---|
| Conservative | 8 | 1 | 0 | ▲1 | 57.1 | 43.2 | 14,823 | ▼2.1 |
| Labour | 5 | 0 | 1 | ▼1 | 35.7 | 22.3 | 7,656 | ▼5.6 |
| Liberal Democrats | 1 | 0 | 0 | 0 | 7.1 | 12.9 | 4,411 | ▼6.8 |
| BNP | 0 | 0 | 0 | 0 | 0.0 | 12.0 | 4,114 | ▲7.9 |
| Independent | 0 | 0 | 0 | 0 | 0.0 | 7.8 | 2,661 | ▲5.9 |
| UKIP | 0 | 0 | 0 | 0 | 0.0 | 1.2 | 397 | New |
| Green | 0 | 0 | 0 | 0 | 0.0 | 0.6 | 211 | ▼0.5 |

All comparisons in vote share are to the corresponding 2003 election.

== Ward results ==
=== Billericay East ===
Location of Billericay East ward

Billericay East
| Party | Candidate | Votes | % | ±% |
|---|---|---|---|---|
| Conservative | David Dadds | 1,373 | 44.2 | −28.3 |
| Liberal Democrats | John James | 1,095 | 35.3 | +16.7 |
| BNP | Laurence Long | 377 | 12.1 | +12.1 |
| Labour | Patricia Reid | 259 | 8.3 | −0.6 |
| Majority | | 278 | 9.0 | −44.9 |
| Turnout | | 3,104 | 34.2 | −3.9 |
| Conservative hold | | Swing | | |

=== Billericay West ===
Location of Billericay West ward

Billericay West
| Party | Candidate | Votes | % | ±% |
|---|---|---|---|---|
| Conservative | Stephen Horgan | 2,017 | 65.7 | +1.6 |
| Liberal Democrats | Geoffrey Taylor | 473 | 15.4 | +0.3 |
| BNP | Michael Bateman | 337 | 11.0 | −1.9 |
| Labour | Margaret Viney | 244 | 7.9 | +0.1 |
| Majority | | 1,544 | 50.3 | +1.2 |
| Turnout | | 3,071 | 32.7 | −3.5 |
| Conservative hold | | Swing | | |

=== Burstead ===
Location of Burstead ward

Burstead
| Party | Candidate | Votes | % | ±% |
|---|---|---|---|---|
| Conservative | Kevin Blake | 1,886 | 62.9 | −6.9 |
| Liberal Democrats | Susan Haeger | 455 | 15.2 | −4.4 |
| BNP | Linda Henry | 334 | 11.1 | +11.1 |
| Labour | Santa Bennett | 325 | 10.8 | +0.2 |
| Majority | | 1,431 | 47.7 | −2.5 |
| Turnout | | 3,000 | 36.2 | −3.8 |
| Conservative hold | | Swing | | |

=== Fryerns ===
Location of Fryerns ward

Fryerns
| Party | Candidate | Votes | % | ±% |
|---|---|---|---|---|
| Labour | Allan Davies | 1,092 | 42.1 | −1.6 |
| Conservative | Mark Coker | 603 | 23.2 | +4.2 |
| BNP | Leonard Heather | 595 | 22.9 | −2.4 |
| Liberal Democrats | John Lutton | 305 | 11.8 | −0.2 |
| Majority | | 489 | 18.8 | +0.3 |
| Turnout | | 2,595 | 28.3 | −3.3 |
| Labour hold | | Swing | | |

=== Laindon Park ===
Location of Laindon Park ward

Laindon Park
| Party | Candidate | Votes | % | ±% |
|---|---|---|---|---|
| Conservative | Jilly Hyde | 850 | 33.3 | −11.2 |
| Labour | Barbara Croft | 624 | 24.5 | −11.3 |
| Independent | Victor York | 613 | 24.0 | +24.0 |
| BNP | David King | 295 | 11.6 | −8.1 |
| Liberal Democrats | Jon Myall | 91 | 3.6 | +3.6 |
| Green | Annie Humphries | 77 | 3.0 | +3.0 |
| Majority | | 226 | 8.9 | +0.2 |
| Turnout | | 2,550 | 30.8 | −0.7 |
| Conservative gain from Labour | | Swing | | |

=== Lee Chapel North ===
Lee Chapel North ward in Basildon 2002

Lee Chapel North
| Party | Candidate | Votes | % | ±% |
|---|---|---|---|---|
| Labour | Richard Rackham | 875 | 39.5 | −0.2 |
| Conservative | Peter Morris | 627 | 28.3 | +4.3 |
| BNP | Jay Slaven | 361 | 16.3 | −5.7 |
| Liberal Democrats | Steve Nice | 218 | 9.8 | +1.5 |
| Green | Ernest Humphries | 134 | 6.0 | +0.0 |
| Majority | | 248 | 11.2 | −4.5 |
| Turnout | | 2,215 | 25.4 | −4.6 |
| Labour hold | | Swing | | |

=== Nethermayne ===
Location of Nethermayne ward

Nethermayne
| Party | Candidate | Votes | % | ±% |
|---|---|---|---|---|
| Liberal Democrats | Ben Williams | 1,451 | 51.0 | +9.0 |
| Conservative | Steve Foster | 874 | 30.7 | −3.3 |
| Labour | Julian Ware-Lane | 520 | 18.3 | −5.7 |
| Majority | | 577 | 20.3 | +12.3 |
| Turnout | | 2,845 | 33.0 | −2.0 |
| Liberal Democrats hold | | Swing | | |

=== Pitsea North West ===
Location of Pitsea North West ward

Pitsea North West
| Party | Candidate | Votes | % | ±% |
|---|---|---|---|---|
| Labour | Keith Bobbin | 734 | 34.3 | −4.3 |
| Conservative | Mark Coxshall | 714 | 33.4 | −11.0 |
| BNP | Geoffrey McCarthy | 362 | 16.9 | +16.9 |
| UKIP | Terry McBride | 167 | 7.8 | +7.8 |
| Liberal Democrats | Martin Howard | 162 | 7.6 | −9.4 |
| Majority | | 20 | 0.9 | |
| Turnout | | 2,139 | 23.2 | −2.0 |
| Labour hold | | Swing | | |

=== Pitsea South East ===
Location of Pitsea South East ward

Pitsea South East
| Party | Candidate | Votes | % | ±% |
|---|---|---|---|---|
| Conservative | Maureen Larkin | 1,151 | 46.7 | −12.4 |
| Labour | Emma Collins | 767 | 31.1 | −9.8 |
| BNP | Sidney Chaney | 375 | 15.2 | +15.2 |
| UKIP | Imelda Clancy | 174 | 7.1 | +7.1 |
| Majority | | 384 | 15.6 | −2.5 |
| Turnout | | 2,467 | 28.4 | −2.4 |
| Conservative hold | | Swing | | |

=== St Martin's ===
Location of St Martin's ward

St Martin's
| Party | Candidate | Votes | % | ±% |
|---|---|---|---|---|
| Labour | Patricia Rackley | 625 | 41.3 | +4.7 |
| Conservative | James Devlin | 346 | 22.9 | −0.5 |
| BNP | Philip Howell | 325 | 21.5 | −5.3 |
| Liberal Democrats | Mike Dickinson | 161 | 10.6 | −2.6 |
| UKIP | Terry Wood | 56 | 3.7 | +3.7 |
| Majority | | 279 | 18.4 | +8.6 |
| Turnout | | 1,513 | 26.6 | −1.3 |
| Labour hold | | Swing | | |

=== Vange ===
Location of Vange ward

Vange
| Party | Candidate | Votes | % | ±% |
|---|---|---|---|---|
| Labour | Danny Nandanwar | 704 | 38.7 | +3.4 |
| Conservative | Luke MacKenzie | 636 | 34.9 | +5.9 |
| BNP | Rodney Leveridge | 481 | 26.4 | +3.7 |
| Majority | | 68 | 3.7 | −2.7 |
| Turnout | | 1,821 | 27.9 | +1.4 |
| Labour hold | | Swing | | |

=== Wickford Castledon ===
Location of Wickford Castleton ward

Wickford Castledon
| Party | Candidate | Votes | % | ±% |
|---|---|---|---|---|
| Conservative | Sylvia Buckley | 1,058 | 47.3 | −8.9 |
| Independent | Alan Ball | 677 | 30.3 | +6.2 |
| BNP | Anthony Gladwin | 272 | 12.2 | +12.2 |
| Labour | Leonard Wilkins | 229 | 10.2 | −1.5 |
| Majority | | 381 | 17.0 | −15.1 |
| Turnout | | 2,236 | 36.9 | −1.1 |
| Conservative hold | | Swing | | |

=== Wickford North ===
Location of Wickford North ward

Wickford North
| Party | Candidate | Votes | % | ±% |
|---|---|---|---|---|
| Conservative | Michael Mowe | 1,592 | 52.7 | −23.9 |
| Independent | David Harrison | 1,021 | 33.8 | +33.8 |
| Labour | Christopher Wilson | 409 | 13.5 | −9.9 |
| Majority | | 571 | 18.9 | −34.4 |
| Turnout | | 3,022 | 32.6 | −1.4 |
| Conservative hold | | Swing | | |

=== Wickford Park ===
Location of Wickford Park ward

Wickford Park
| Party | Candidate | Votes | % | ±% |
|---|---|---|---|---|
| Conservative | Christopher Jackman | 1,096 | 64.7 | −3.7 |
| Independent | Derek Paffett | 350 | 20.6 | +20.6 |
| Labour | Anthony Borlase | 249 | 14.7 | +1.4 |
| Majority | | 746 | 44.0 | −6.1 |
| Turnout | | 1,695 | 24.9 | −2.8 |
| Conservative hold | | Swing | | |
