= 2014 Basildon Borough Council election =

2014 UK local government election

2014 Basildon District Council election
- 22 May 2014

15 of the 42 seats to Basildon District Council 22 seats needed for a majority
| | First party | Second party | Third party |
|---|---|---|---|
| Party | Conservative | UKIP | Labour |
| Last election | 25 | 0 | 15 |
| Seats before | 24 | 1 | 11 |
| Seats won | 4 | 11 | 0 |
| Seats after | 17 | 12 | 9 |
| Seat change | ▼7 | ▲11 | ▼2 |
| Popular vote | 13,614 | 15,163 | 8,092 |
| Percentage | 35.0% | 39.0% | 20.8% |
| | Fourth party | Fifth party |
| Party | Independent | Liberal Democrats |
| Last election | 0 | 2 |
| Seats before | 4 | 2 |
| Seats won | 0 | 0 |
| Seats after | 3 | 1 |
| Seat change | ▼1 | ▼1 |
| Popular vote | 36 | 1,846 |
| Percentage | 0.1% | 4.7% |
- Map of the results of the 2014 Basildon council election. Conservatives in blue, Labour in red and Liberal Democrats in yellow. Wards in grey were not contested in 2014.
Council control before election
Conservative Party
Council control after election
No overall control

The 2014 Basildon District Council election took place on 22 May 2014 to elect members of Basildon District Council in England. This was on the same day as other local elections and elections to the European Parliament. This election was to elect one third of the council, plus one additional seat which was vacant. These seats were last up for election in 2010.

== Results summary ==
2014 Basildon Borough Council Election
| Party | Seats | Gains | Losses | Net gain/loss | Seats % | Votes % | Votes | +/− |
|---|---|---|---|---|---|---|---|---|
| UKIP | 9 | 9 | 0 | +9 | 60.0 | 39.2 | 16,087 | ▲35.7 |
| Conservative | 4 | 0 | -7 | -7 | 26.7 | 33.8 | 13,877 | ▼15.8 |
| Labour | 2 | 0 | -3 | -3 | 13.3 | 21.9 | 9,011 | ▲0.5 |
| Liberal Democrats | 0 | 0 | 0 | 0 | 0.0 | 4.7 | 1,937 | ▼13.6 |
| National Front | 0 | 0 | 0 | 0 | 0.0 | 0.2 | 101 | New |
| TUSC | 0 | 0 | 0 | 0 | 0.0 | 0.1 | 39 | New |
| Independent | 0 | 0 | 0 | 0 | 0.0 | 0.1 | 36 | New |

The turnout was 32.8%, and there were 160 ballots rejected. All comparisons in vote share are to the corresponding 2010 election.

== Council composition ==
Prior to the election, the composition of the council was:

↓
| 24 | 11 | 4 | 2 | 1 |
| Conservative | Labour | IND | L | UK |

After the election, the composition of the council was:

↓
| 17 | 12 | 9 | 3 | 1 |
| Conservative | UKIP | Labour | IND | L |

UK - UKIP
IND - Independent
L - Liberal Democrats

== Ward results ==
=== Billericay East ===
Location of Billericay East ward

Billericay East
| Party | Candidate | Votes | % | ±% |
|---|---|---|---|---|
| Conservative | Andrew Schrader | 1,724 | 50.8 | −10.3 |
| UKIP | Terry Gandy | 987 | 29.1 | +24.5 |
| Labour | Patricia Reid | 414 | 12.2 | +1.2 |
| Liberal Democrats | Nigel Horn | 266 | 7.8 | −12.5 |
| Majority | | 737 | 21.7 | |
| Turnout | | 3,404 | 36.3 | |
| Conservative hold | | Swing | | |

=== Billericay West ===
Location of Billericay West ward

Billericay West
| Party | Candidate | Votes | % | ±% |
|---|---|---|---|---|
| Conservative | Anthony Hedley* | 1,912 | 57.7 | −5.5 |
| UKIP | Susan McCaffery | 868 | 26.2 | +22.6 |
| Labour | Andrew Ansell | 344 | 10.4 | −0.9 |
| Liberal Democrats | Jenny Cole | 192 | 5.8 | −12.8 |
| Majority | | 1,044 | 31.5 | |
| Turnout | | 3,326 | 35.2 | |
| Conservative hold | | Swing | | |

=== Burstead ===
Location of Burstead ward

Burstead
| Party | Candidate | Votes | % | ±% |
|---|---|---|---|---|
| Conservative | Andrew Baggott | 1,798 | 55.0 | −3.3 |
| UKIP | Paul Downes | 932 | 28.5 | +19.1 |
| Labour | Wendy Aitken | 382 | 11.7 | +0.2 |
| Liberal Democrats | Ben Williams | 156 | 4.8 | −11.9 |
| Majority | | 866 | 26.5 | |
| Turnout | | 3,284 | 38.0 | |
| Conservative hold | | Swing | | |

=== Crouch ===
Location of Crouch ward

Crouch
| Party | Candidate | Votes | % | ±% |
|---|---|---|---|---|
| Conservative | Terri Sargeant* | 1,004 | 46.5 | −15.9 |
| UKIP | Clifford Hammans | 884 | 41.0 | N/A |
| Labour | Malcolm Reid | 270 | 12.5 | −3.2 |
| Majority | | 120 | 5.6 | |
| Turnout | | 2,166 | 33.7 | |
| Conservative hold | | Swing | | |

=== Fryerns ===
Location of Fryerns ward

Fryerns
| Party | Candidate | Votes | % | ±% |
|---|---|---|---|---|
| UKIP | David Sheppard | 1,199 | 42.9 | +37.5 |
| Labour | William Archibald* | 983 | 35.1 | −1.5 |
| Conservative | Ian Dwyer | 502 | 17.9 | −12.9 |
| Liberal Democrats | Colin Grant | 74 | 2.6 | −13.4 |
| TUSC | David Murray | 39 | 1.4 | N/A |
| Majority | | 216 | 7.7 | |
| Turnout | | 2,807 | 28.5 | |
| UKIP gain from Labour | | Swing | | |

=== Laindon Park ===
Location of Laindon Park ward

Laindon Park
| Party | Candidate | Votes | % | ±% |
|---|---|---|---|---|
| UKIP | Mark Ellis | 1,122 | 41.0 | N/A |
| Labour | Lauren Brown | 885 | 32.3 | +2.1 |
| Conservative | John Dornan* | 599 | 21.9 | −21.2 |
| Liberal Democrats | Francis Barnes-Challinor | 112 | 4.1 | −12.7 |
| National Front | Anthony Harms | 21 | 0.8 | N/A |
| Majority | | 237 | 8.7 | |
| Turnout | | 2,747 | 30.3 | |
| UKIP gain from Conservative | | Swing | | |

=== Langdon Hills ===
Location of Langdon Hills ward

Langdon Hills
| Party | Candidate | Votes | % | ±% |
|---|---|---|---|---|
| UKIP | Linda Allport-Hodge | 1,033 | 40.9 | +34.5 |
| Conservative | Sandra Hillier* | 958 | 37.9 | −16.2 |
| Labour | Matthew Whaley | 425 | 16.8 | −1.5 |
| Liberal Democrats | Alan Richards | 111 | 4.4 | −11.6 |
| Majority | | 75 | 3.0 | |
| Turnout | | 2,538 | 36.0 | |
| UKIP gain from Conservative | | Swing | | |

=== Lee Chapel North ===
Location of Lee Chapel North ward

Lee Chapel North (two seats)
| Party | Candidate | Votes | % | ±% |
|---|---|---|---|---|
| UKIP | Frank Ferguson | 983 | 39.1 | N/A |
| UKIP | Trevor Malsbury | 924 | 36.8 | N/A |
| Labour | Alan Bennett* | 922 | 36.7 | −0.7 |
| Labour | Jenefer Taylor | 919 | 36.6 | N/A |
| Conservative | Andrew Barnes | 329 | 13.1 | −20.8 |
| Conservative | Nicole Stephens | 263 | 10.5 | N/A |
| Liberal Democrats | Phil Jenkins | 99 | 3.9 | −13.7 |
| Liberal Democrats | Steve Nice | 91 | 3.6 | N/A |
| National Front | Thomas Beaney | 80 | 3.2 | N/A |
| Majority | | 2 | 0.1 | |
| Turnout | | 2,530 | 26.5 | |
| UKIP gain from Labour | | Swing | | |
| UKIP gain from Independent | | Swing | | |

The second vacancy was caused by the resignation of an independent councillor who had been elected in 2012 as a Labour candidate. Malsbury will fill this seat, and will thus be up for re-election in May 2016. Ferguson will fill the seat that was ordinarily due for election in 2014, and will face re-election in 2018.

=== Nethermayne ===
Location of Nethermayne ward

Nethermayne
| Party | Candidate | Votes | % | ±% |
|---|---|---|---|---|
| UKIP | Kerry Smith | 1,340 | 43.5 | N/A |
| Liberal Democrats | Linda Williams* | 700 | 22.7 | −13.7 |
| Labour | David Kirkman | 559 | 18.1 | −5.6 |
| Conservative | Colin Grant | 446 | 14.5 | −16.7 |
| Independent | None of the Above X | 36 | 1.2 | N/A |
| Majority | | 640 | 20.8 | |
| Turnout | | 3,085 | 34.1 | |
| UKIP gain from Liberal Democrats | | Swing | | |

=== Pitsea North West ===
Location of Pitsea North West ward

Pitsea North West
| Party | Candidate | Votes | % | ±% |
|---|---|---|---|---|
| UKIP | Imelda Clancy | 1,156 | 45.1 | +35.8 |
| Labour | Melissa McGeorge | 906 | 35.3 | +4.2 |
| Conservative | Luke Mackenzie | 427 | 16.7 | −17.4 |
| Liberal Democrats | Martin Howard | 73 | 2.8 | −13.1 |
| Majority | | 250 | 9.8 | |
| Turnout | | 2,573 | 27.5 | |
| UKIP gain from Conservative | | Swing | | |

=== Pitsea South East ===
Location of Pitsea South East ward

Pitsea South East
| Party | Candidate | Votes | % | ±% |
|---|---|---|---|---|
| UKIP | Stephen Ward | 1,061 | 37.9 | +29.4 |
| Labour | David Burton-Sampson | 966 | 34.5 | +2.7 |
| Conservative | David Abrahall* | 709 | 25.3 | −14.4 |
| Liberal Democrats | Vivien Howard | 63 | 2.3 | −9.3 |
| Majority | | 95 | 3.4 | |
| Turnout | | 2,815 | 31.4 | |
| UKIP gain from Conservative | | Swing | | |

=== Wickford Castledon ===
Location of Wickford Castleton ward

Wickford Castledon
| Party | Candidate | Votes | % | ±% |
|---|---|---|---|---|
| UKIP | Alan Ball | 1,118 | 48.7 | N/A |
| Conservative | Malcolm Buckley* | 909 | 40.0 | −19.3 |
| Labour | Andrew Buxton | 269 | 11.7 | −5.6 |
| Majority | | 209 | 9.1 | |
| Turnout | | 2,312 | 36.6 | |
| UKIP gain from Conservative | | Swing | | |

=== Wickford North ===
Location of Wickford North ward

Wickford North
| Party | Candidate | Votes | % | ±% |
|---|---|---|---|---|
| UKIP | Peter Holliman | 1,487 | 44.8 | |
| Conservative | Tony Ball* | 1,357 | 40.9 | |
| Labour | Albert Ede | 475 | 14.3 | |
| Majority | | 130 | 3.9 | |
| Turnout | | 3,331 | 33.7 | |
| UKIP gain from Conservative | | Swing | | |

=== Wickford Park ===
Location of Wickford Park ward

Wickford Park
| Party | Candidate | Votes | % | ±% |
|---|---|---|---|---|
| UKIP | David Harrison | 993 | 44.6 | N/A |
| Conservative | Donald Morris* | 940 | 42.2 | −16.5 |
| Labour | George Wake | 292 | 13.1 | −2.5 |
| Majority | | 53 | 2.4 | |
| Turnout | | 2,237 | 31.6 | |
| UKIP gain from Conservative | | Swing | | |

== Changes since May 2014 ==
In December 2014, Kerry Smith, the then leader of the UKIP group and newly selected parliamentary candidate for South Basildon and East Thurrock resigned from the party after the release of a tape recording of a private phone call in which he made offensive remarks about fellow UKIP members. Imelda Clancy also left the party later that month, and the two sit as "Independence Group" members on the council, reducing UKIP's strength to ten seats, though they remain the second-largest party ahead of Labour on nine seats.

A third independent councilor (originally elected as Labour) joined the Independence Group in January 2015.
