= St Mary Magdalene, Great Burstead =

Church in Essex, England

Church of St Mary Magdalene
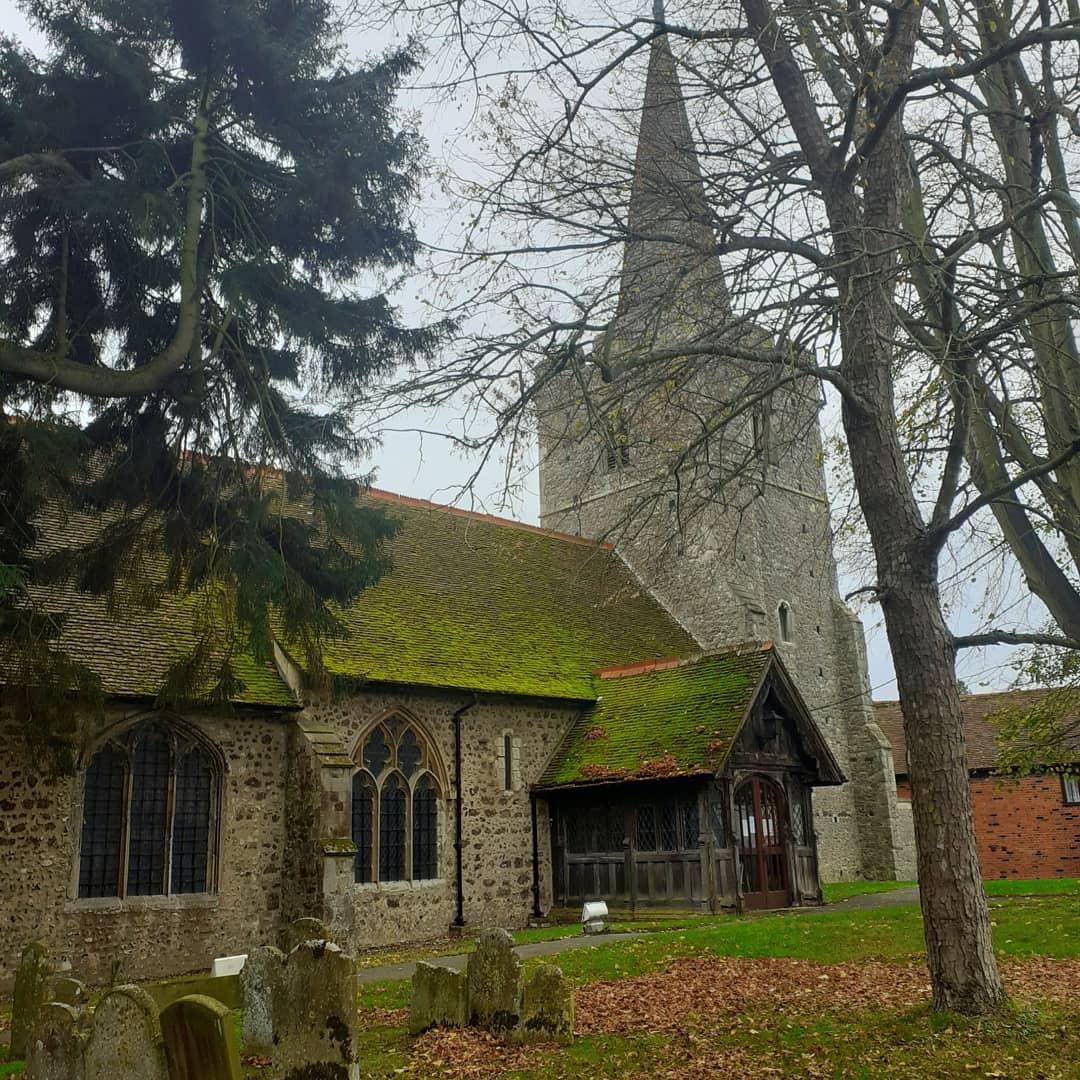
- North entrance of the church

- Location within Essex
- 51°36′14″N 0°25′30″E
- OS grid reference: TQ 68065 92239
- Country: England
- Denomination: Anglican
- Website: greatburstead-church.co.uk

History
- Status: Active
- Dedication: Mary Magdalene

Architecture
- Functional status: Parish church

Administration
- Province: Canterbury
- Diocese: Chelmsford
- Archdeaconry: Barking
- Deanery: Barking & Dagenham
- Parish: Great Burstead

Clergy
- Vicar: Michael Hall

Listed Building – Grade I
- Official name: Church of St Mary Magdalene
- Designated: 4 July 1955
- Reference no.: 1122255

Church of St Mary Magdalene is a Grade I-listed parish church located in the village of Great Burstead, about 1.5 mi (2.4 km) south of Billericay, Essex, England. While the current building dates back to the 12th century, it's believed a wooden church may have been built on the site as early as the seventh century. The church is part of the Great Burstead Conservation Area, which was designated as such in 1983.

== Location ==
The church is in the village of Great Burstead, about 3 mi (4.8 km) northwest of Basildon and 10 mi (16 km) south of Chelmsford. The churchyard, about 60 m (200 ft) above sea level, overlooks the Crouch and Thames river valleys. The village is on the London Basin and is built on London Clay, partly overlain by the sandier Bagshot Beds; both beds were deposited during the Eocene.

== History ==
=== Saxons ===
The site of Great Burstead Church was originally a Saxon settlement. The name Great Burstead is derived from the Saxon burgh (a fortified place) and stead (farmstead). Both terms suggest that it was a fortified settlement. Area topography indicates a raised position along its boundary, with a ditch and stream to the west.

The Saxons, under King Æscwine, arrived in Essex in 527. Cedd converted Ebba, the thane of Great Burstead, to Christianity in 653. The first Christian Saxon King, Sæberht (died 616), is said to be buried in the grounds; he was converted by the Christian mission of Mellitus, the first Bishop of London.

Ebba left due to family quarrels and was succeeded by Edwy, who was persuaded by Bishop Earconwald to build a church in 669 which was dedicated to Theodore, Archbishop of Canterbury. Around 680, Bishop Cedd of Essex blessed a well on the church site and placed a cross. A wooden building was constructed around then, whose foundations may remain under the present church.

=== Normans and 12th-century construction ===
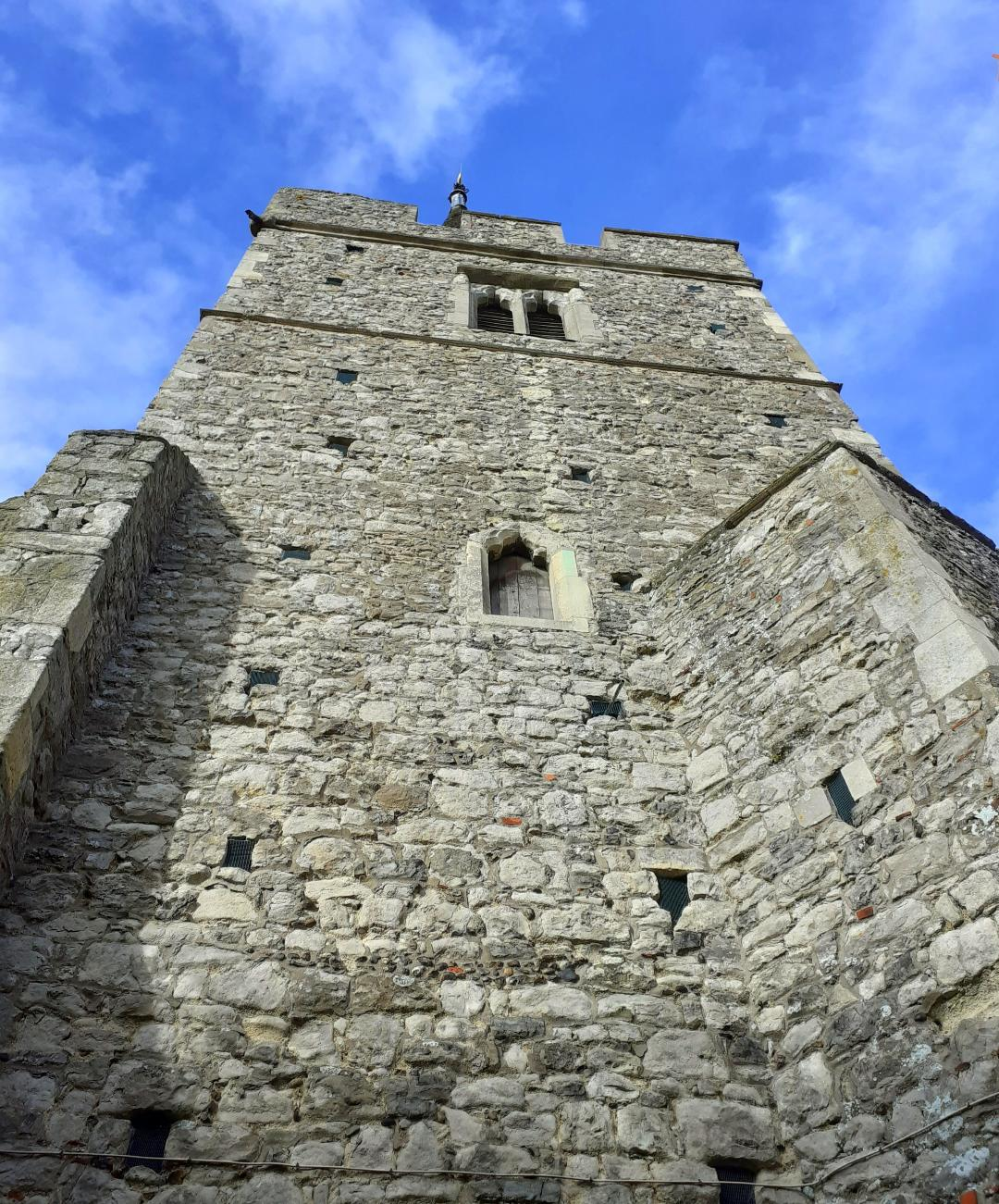
The church's 14th-century west tower

William the Conqueror gave 39 lordships in Essex to his half-brother, Odo of Bayeux, and Great Burstead became his capital manor. By 1147, the lordship belonged to the Cistercian monks of Stratford Langthorne Abbey. Thames flooding forced the monastery to move to Great Burstead Church in 1338, where it remained until 1551. The church is of Norman construction.

The walls of the nave, 44 by 23 feet (13.4 m × 7.0 m), were built from probably-locally-sourced stone rubble. The north wall of the nave, with one arrowslit window, dates to the 12th century. Arrowslit windows were not used by the Normans in castle construction early in the century; they came into use later in the 12th century, during the time of Richard the Lionheart. In the south chapel is a 12th-century oak crusaders' chest which was used to collect funds for the Crusades during the rule of King Henry I.

=== West tower and bells ===
The church's 14th-century, 14-foot-square (4.3 m) west tower, built of ragstone dressed with limestone, has three stages in height. It has angle buttresses and a castellated parapet on top, surmounted by a shingle spire built around a timber spire. The tower's original putlocks are in place.

Its five bells are supported by an oak cradle dating to 1650. Bell number one, built in 1458 by Balcombe in London, weighs 750 lbs. (381 kg). Bell number two, built in 1724 by Thomas Gardiner in Sudbury, Suffolk, weighs 450 lbs.(228 kg). Bell number three, built in 1731 by Thomas Gardiner, weighs 900 lbs. (460 kg). Bell number four, built in 1814 by Thomas Meares II at London's Whitechapel Bell Foundry, weighs 550 lbs (279 kg). Bell number five weighs 650 lbs. (330 kg). The bells were listed by John C. L. Stahlschmidt in his 1884 book, Surrey Bells and London Bell-Founders.

The south aisle and the chancel in the northeast corner were added during the 15th century. Recent renovations revealed 14th-, 15th- and 16th-century paintings along the south wall of the south aisle, which also has restored 15th-century benches. The church was extended during the early 16th century with the 31-by-16-foot (9.4 m × 4.9 m) south chapel. The north and south porches were added that century with crown post roofs; the north porch has heavy oak beams, and the south porch has ornate wood carvings. The bells in the church are not currently ringable, due to structural issues with the timbers.

== Churchyard ==
=== Yew tree ===
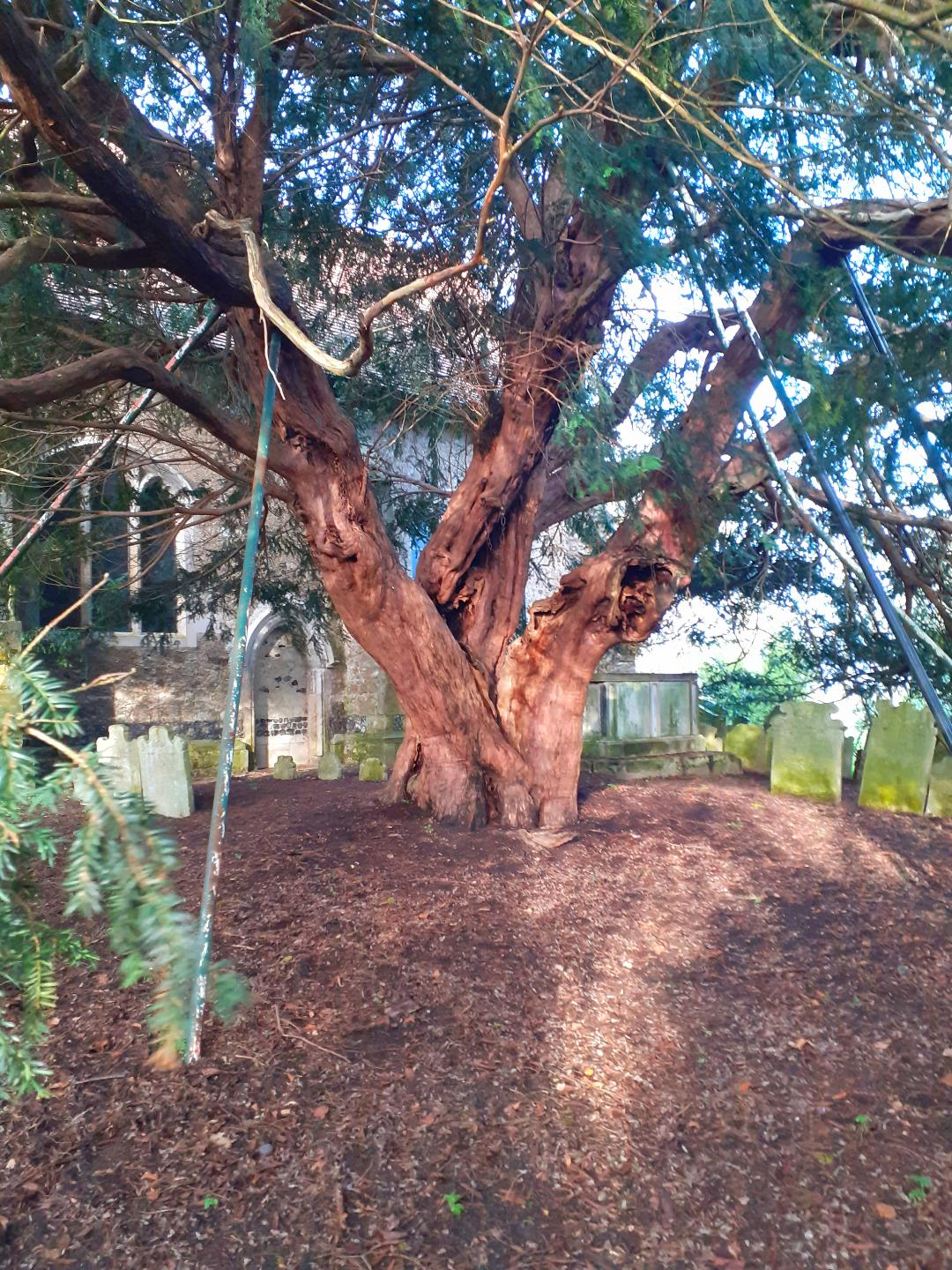
The church's yew tree is the oldest in Essex.

At the rear of the church is the oldest yew tree in Essex. Yew trees are classified as male or female, and the tree is estimated to be about 800 years old.

=== Battle of Billericay ===
The Battle of Billericay took place at dawn on 28 June 1381. Wat Tyler (the leader of the Peasants' Revolt) had been killed in London, and the peasants fled in panic towards Billericay. King Richard II's soldiers pursued the Essex men towards Norsey Woods, north-east of Billericay, and the insurgents hastily set up barricades with wagons. The king's forces, led by Thomas of Woodstock and Thomas Percy, quickly rode through the barricades on horseback. An estimated 500 Essex men were killed at Norsey Woods, many of whom are buried in the churchyard.

== Mayflower pilgrims ==
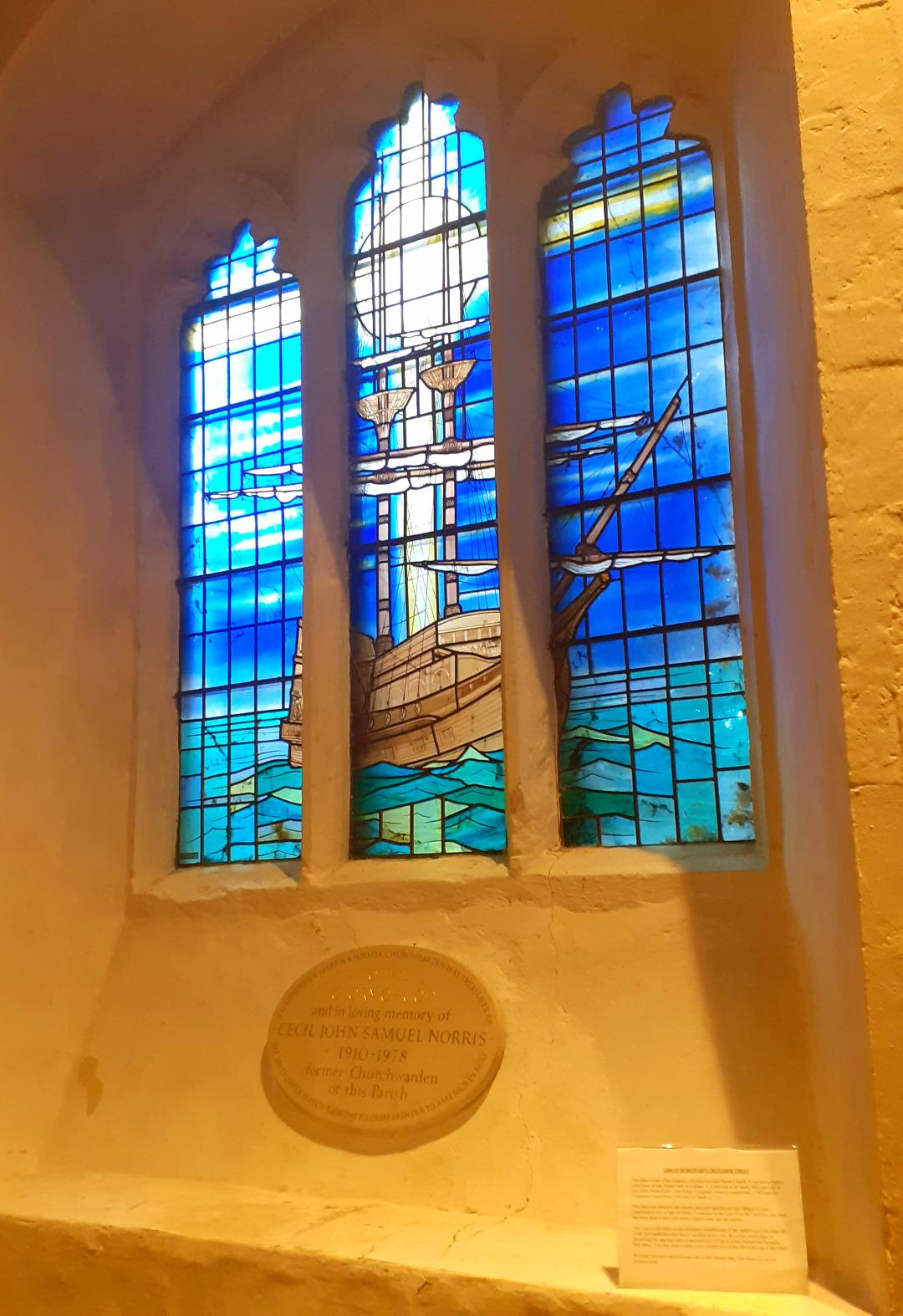
Mayflower church window

Billericay's best-known resident, Christopher Martin, was born around 1575. A prosperous merchant, Martin was churchwarden of St Mary Magdalene in 1611–1612. He became a Puritan, and was investigated by the church for misusing church funds at Ingatestone Hall. Martin became treasurer of the Mayflower, against the advice of the ship's Dutch financial backers. Unpopular with its crew, he bankrupted the ship and survived a near-mutiny only when the Mayflower sighted land. He was a signatory of the 11 November 1620 Mayflower Compact. Martin died on 8 January 1621 and was buried at the Coles Hill Burial Ground in Plymouth, Massachusetts.

Mary Prowe married Martin in the church on 26 February 1606. They had one son, Nathaniel, who remained in England. Mary died on 11 January 1621, three days after Christopher's death.

Solomon Prowe, Mary's son from her first marriage, was born c. 1596 and was baptized at the church. He was a member of the King's Watch, a local militia with strong Puritan views. After surviving the Mayflower voyage, he died on 24 December 1620 when exploration of Plymouth Harbour had just been completed.

== Crash of Zeppelin L 32 ==
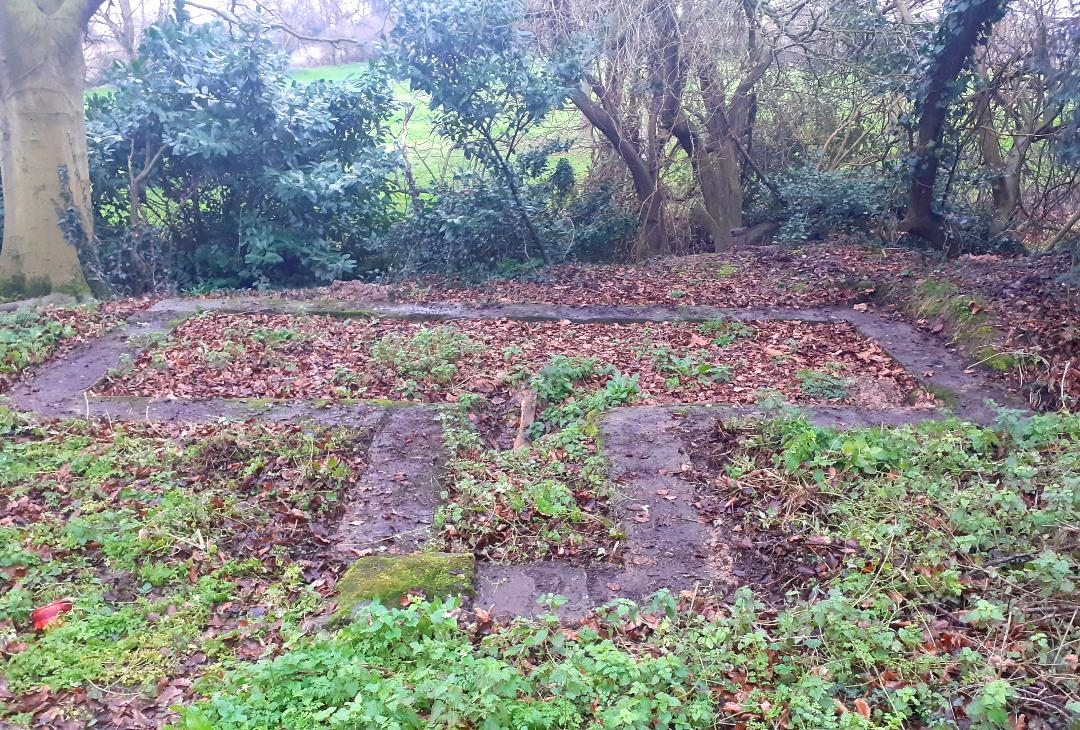
Burial site from 1916 to 1966 of the L 32 Zeppelin crew, seen in 2021

The population of east London were denied the comfort of their beds on 23 September 1916 by police whistles, as the city was attacked by four German zeppelins. At about 01:30, the Zeppelin L 32 was struck by Second Lieutenant Frederick Sowrey of the Royal Flying Corps. A further burst of machine-gun fire with delayed incendiary bullets severely damaged the airship's gas-filled cells; the ship twisted and turned, blazing from end to end, shedding burning debris as she passed over Billericay's High and Chapel Streets. Local residents said that it sounded like a train rattling windows, making a rushing noise as it went past, and the fire illuminated the countryside for miles around. The ship's captain, Oberleutnant Werner Peterson, jumped clear clutching the ship's log. Its stern struck an oak tree near present-day Greens Farm Lane, and the ship ploughed into nearby fields at Snails Farm. The body of the commander was found in the field, and the rest of the crew died in the L 32's twisted aluminum hull.

The 22 crew members of L 32 were recovered and placed in a barn near Greens Farm Lane, The next morning, the church road was impassable due to spectators approaching the crash site. Two days later, the bodies of the Zeppelin crew were transported by road to a prepared burial site.

In 1966, the crew were exhumed and moved to the Cannock Chase German Military Cemetery in Staffordshire. The church was visited by a number of German citizens from the 1916 burial to the late 1960s. Cater Museum curator Ted Wright wrote a book, The Fate of the Zeppelin L32; according to Wright,

Mr. Frederick Eales, a local of Billericay, noticed a military-looking gentleman passing along the high street and asked if he could help, The gentleman replied that he was a high-ranking German officer seeking the whereabouts of the grave of the men of L32. Mr. Eales said that not only did he know where, but he would take him; after showing him the grave in Great Burstead churchyard, they returned to Eales' house for refreshment. Some weeks later, a parcel arrived from Germany containing a glass bowl with a zeppelin engraved on it and a letter of appreciation for Mr. Eales' help.

== Present day ==
St Mary Magdalene is a parish church in the Deanery of Basildon in the Diocese of Chelmsford. Worship is in the Anglo-Catholic tradition. Church services are held on Sundays and special occasions, and the church performs weddings, funerals and baptisms. The church grounds are cared for by volunteers from the congregation and the community.
