= Great Burstead and South Green =

- Civil parish
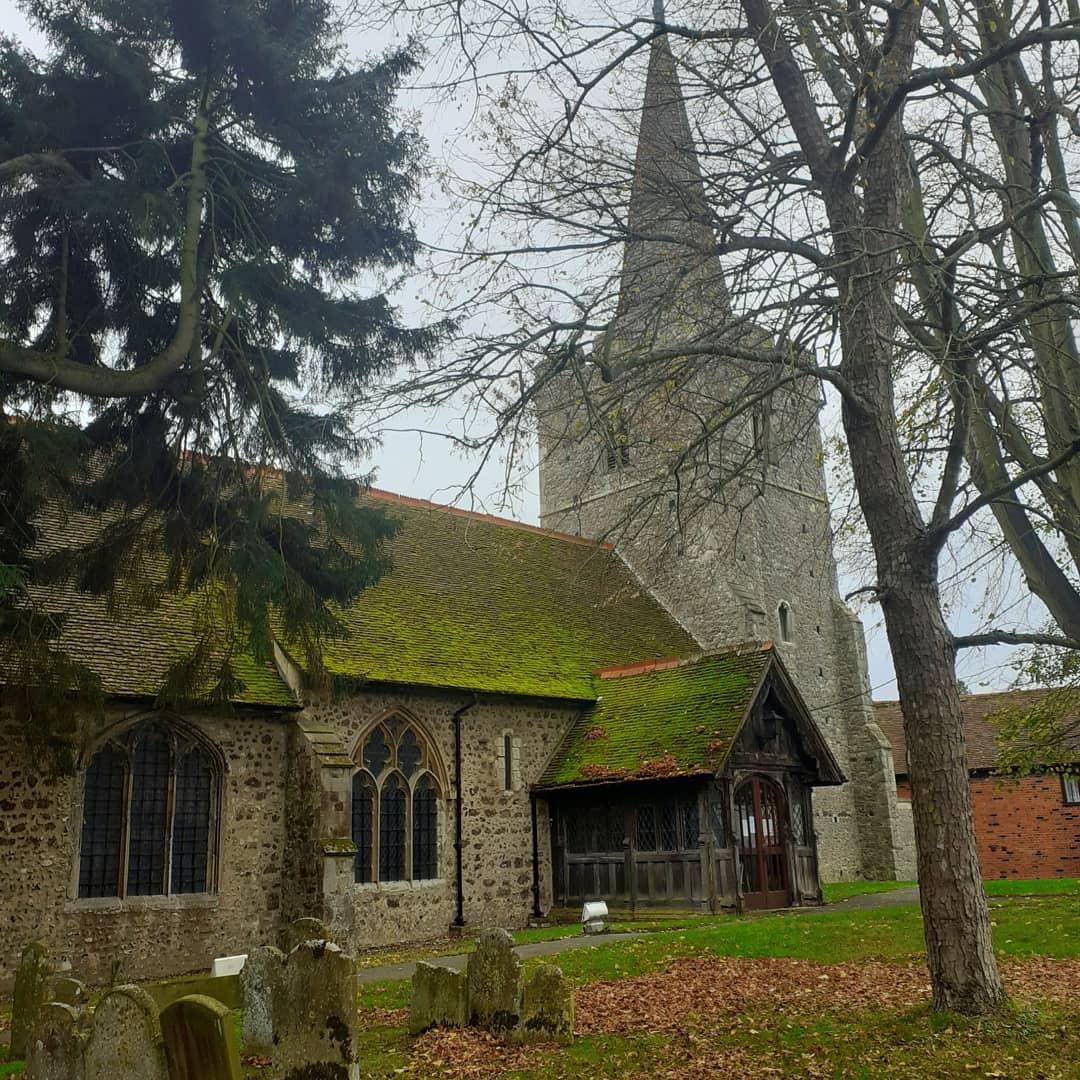
- Great Burstead church
- Interactive map of Great Burstead and South Green
- Coordinates: 51.604078°N 0.42522669°E
- Country: England
- Primary council: Basildon
- County: Essex
- Region: East of England
- Great Burstead and South Green: 1996
- Status: Parish
- Main settlements: Great Burstead, Noak Hill and South Green

Area
  - Total: 7.420 km^{2} (2.865 sq mi)

Population (2021)
  - Total: 6,265
  - Density: 844.3/km^{2} (2,187/sq mi)
- Website: http://www.greatbursteadsouthgreen-vc.gov.uk/

Great Burstead and South Green is a civil parish in the Basildon borough of Essex, England. The parish includes the settlements of Great Burstead, Noak Hill and South Green. At the 2021 census the parish had a population of 6,265.

The parish touches Billericay, Little Burstead, Noak Bridge and Ramsden Crays. There are 14 listed buildings in the parish.

== History ==
Great Burstead was an ancient parish. It became part of the Billericay Urban District in 1934 and was abolished in 1937 when all the parishes in that district were merged into a single parish called Billericay. The urban district was renamed Basildon in 1955 and was reformed to become the modern Basildon district in 1974, at which point the district also became an unparished area.

The modern parish of Great Burstead and South Green was formed on 1 September 1996 from part of the unparished area. The new parish covers a smaller area than the pre-1937 parish of Great Burstead, which had also included the town of Billericay.

== Governance ==
There are three tiers of local government covering Great Burstead and South Green, at parish (village), district, and county level: Great Burstead and South Green Village Council, Basildon Borough Council, and Essex County Council. The village council meets at the South Green Memorial Hall on Southend Road.

Great Burstead village and South Green both form part of the Billericay built up area as defined by the Office for National Statistics. Noak Hill is classed as a separate built up area.

== Listed buildings ==
There are 15 listed buildings recorded in the National Heritage List for England for Great Burstead and South Green. Of these one is grade I and 14 are grade II.

Name	Grade	Location	Type	Completed (Note: The date given is the date used by Historic England as significant for the initial building or that of an important part in the structure's description.)	Date designated	Grid ref. (Note: The grid reference is based on the British national grid reference system, sometimes known as OSGB36, used by the Ordnance Survey.) Geo-coordinates	Notes	Entry number (Note: The "List Entry Number" is a unique number assigned to each listed building and scheduled monument by Historic England.)	Image	Wikidata
120 Church Street	II	120, Church Street, Great Burstead			6 January 1975	TQ6806892306; 51°36′16″N 0°25′32″E		1170008	Upload Photo	Q26463254
124 and 126, Church Street	II	124 and 126, Church Street, Great Burstead			6 January 1975	TQ6803992279; 51°36′15″N 0°25′30″E		1122256	Upload Photo	Q26415397
The Village Stores	II	125, Church Street, Great Burstead			6 January 1975	TQ6803592237; 51°36′14″N 0°25′30″E		1338381	Upload Photo	Q26622709
Church of St Mary Magdalene	I	Church Street, Great Burstead	church building		4 July 1955	TQ6806592239; 51°36′14″N 0°25′32″E		1122255	Church of St Mary Magdalene More images	Q17535729
Coxes Farmhouse	II	Coxes Farm Road	farmhouse		6 January 1975	TQ6926593275; 51°36′46″N 0°26′36″E		1338382	Coxes Farmhouse More images	Q26622710
Oak Hill Farm Barn	II	Coxes Farm Road			21 October 2005	TQ6939293883; 51°37′06″N 0°26′43″E		1391396	Upload Photo	Q26670760
89, Grange Road	II	89, Grange Road			24 September 1990	TQ6856393032; 51°36′39″N 0°25′59″E		1275848	Upload Photo	Q26565404
Brick Farm Building About 50 Metres North North West of the Grange	II	Mill Road, Great Burstead			25 September 1990	TQ6853592451; 51°36′20″N 0°25′56″E		1338400	Upload Photo	Q26622724
Blackmore Farmhouse	II	Noak Hill Road			6 January 1975	TQ6746092636; 51°36′28″N 0°25′01″E		1122239	Upload Photo	Q26415383
Sames Cottage	II	19, Outwood Common Road			6 January 1975	TQ6847593481; 51°36′54″N 0°25′55″E		1122242	Upload Photo	Q26415386
Elm Cottages	II	1 and 2, Southend Road			4 July 1955	TQ6862893366; 51°36′50″N 0°26′03″E		1122247	Upload Photo	Q26415393
Barn to the North East of Southend Farmhouse	II	Southend Road			6 January 1975	TQ6883793146; 51°36′43″N 0°26′13″E		1170931	Upload Photo	Q26464629
Gatwick House	II	Southend Road			4 July 1955	TQ6796393840; 51°37′06″N 0°25′29″E		1338414	Upload Photo	Q26622735
Mill Cottages	II	Southend Road			6 January 1975	TQ6782593862; 51°37′07″N 0°25′22″E		1170918	Upload Photo	Q26464609
Southend Farmhouse	II	Southend Road			6 January 1975	TQ6880793128; 51°36′42″N 0°26′12″E		1122246	Upload Photo	Q26415391
