= Great Burstead =

Former civil parish in Essex, England

Coordinates: 51.604°N 0.445°E

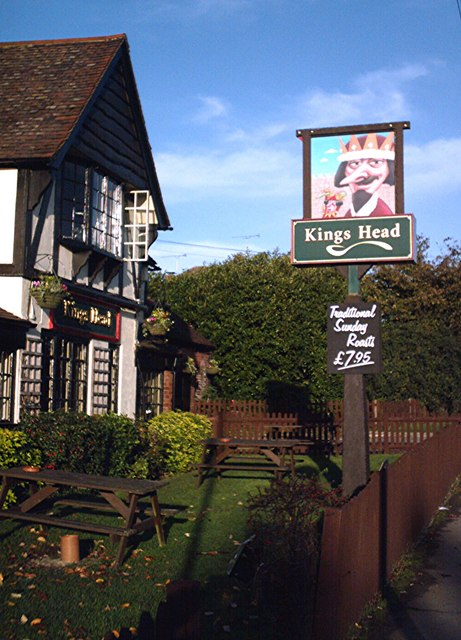
- The King's Head pub

- Location within Essex
- OS grid reference: TQ679922
- Civil parish: Great Burstead and South Green
- District: Basildon
- Shire county: Essex
- Region: East
- Country: England
- Sovereign state: United Kingdom
- Post town: Billericay
- Postcode district: CM11 2
- Dialling code: 01277
- Police: Essex
- Fire: Essex
- Ambulance: East of England
- UK Parliament: Billericay

Great Burstead is a village in the civil parish of Great Burstead and South Green in the Borough of Basildon in Essex, England. The village lies 1.5 miles (2.4 km) south of the centre of Billericay. Great Burstead and the adjoining village of South Green are both now classed as part of the Billericay built up area.

== History ==
The name Burstead is Old English and means a fortified place.

Evidence of human occupation in the area has been found from the Paleolithic and Mesolithic eras. In Roman times, the main settlement in the area appears to have been at Billericay. In Saxon times a new fortified settlement, the "burgh stead", developed to the south of Billericay. Great Burstead had a market and it remained the main settlement in the area from medieval times until Billericay overtook it again in the 19th century.

The Domesday Book of 1086 lists two estates or manors at a vill called Burghesteda in the Barstable Hundred of Essex. The book does not otherwise distinguish between the manors, but historians have deduced that the manor held by the Bishop of London was Little Burstead, and the manor held by Odo of Bayeux (half brother of William the Conqueror) was Great Burstead. Odo's manor was recorded as having 118 households.

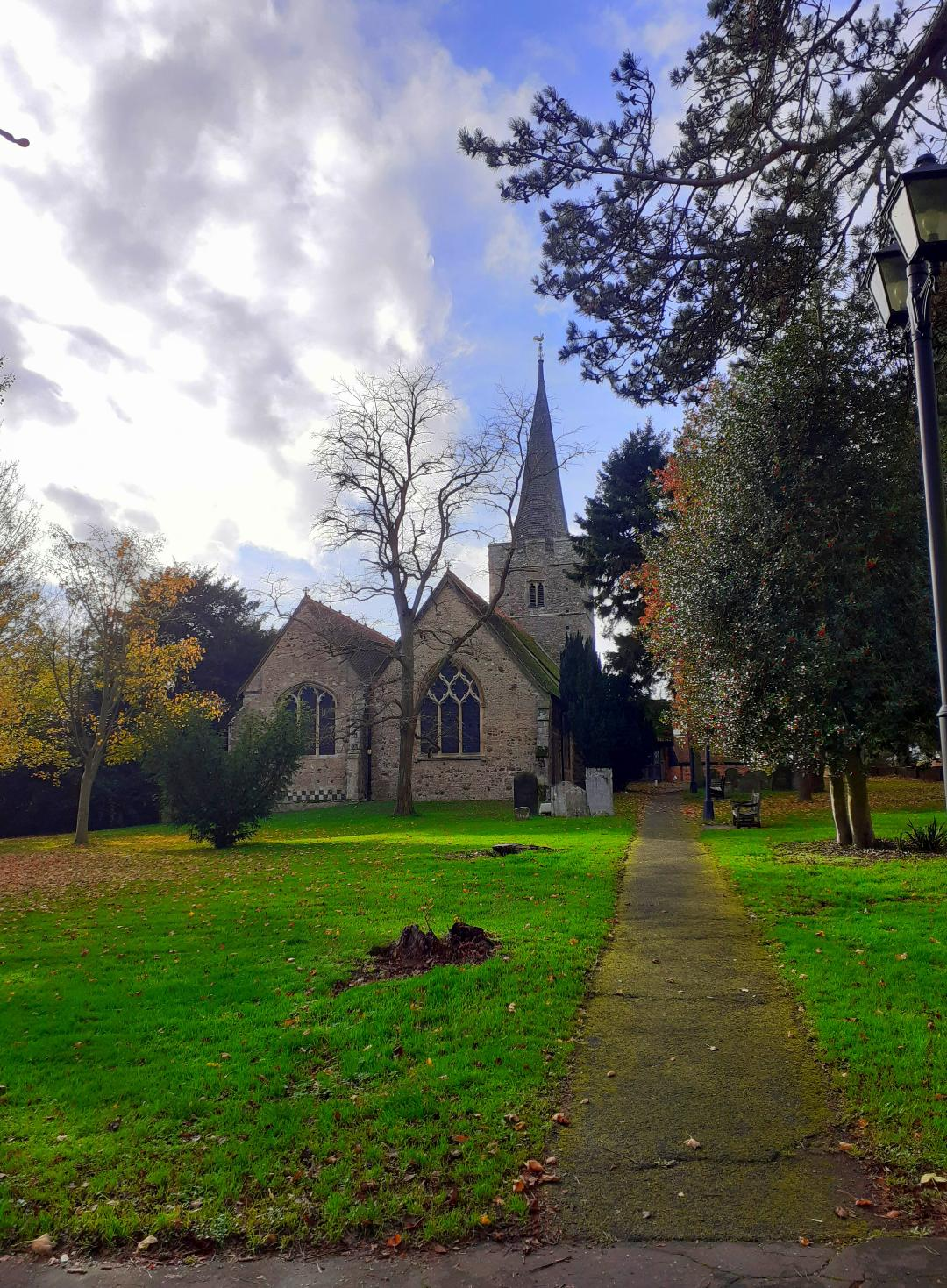
St Mary Magdalene's Church

No church or priest is explicitly mentioned at either Burstead in the Domesday Book, but Great Burstead was an ancient parish. There is evidence of early Christian activity in the area. Sæberht, the first King of the East Saxons to convert to Christianity, was reputedly buried at Great Burstead in 616 AD. The missionary and bishop Cedd visited in 653 AD, when he converted the thane of Great Burstead to Christianity, sanctified a well, and set up a preaching cross. A wooden church was built around 680 AD to replace the preaching cross. The current stone church, dedicated to St Mary Magdalene, dates back to Norman times, although most of the building was rebuilt in the 14th and 15th centuries.

An ancient English Yew, found to the south of the church, is thought to be one of Essex's oldest trees.

In 1381 the Peasants' Revolt took place, and after the death of Wat Tyler in London, the Essex men retreated back to Billericay. The Battle of Billericay took place on 28 June 1381 probably in Norsey Wood; 500 Essex man were killed, and over 700 horses were captured. The men are believed to be buried along with their leaders in the churchyard at St Mary Magdalene's.

Thomas Watts, a local Great Burstead draper, was burned at the stake in Chelmsford for refusing to pray in church under Queen Mary I. On 9 June 1555, Thomas was buried in Great Burstead Church.

Christopher Martin, a merchant and local property owner was born in Great Burstead in 1582. He married Mary Prowe in Great Burstead church in 1607 and became a churchwarden there in 1611. In 1620 he became the Governor of the Mayflower ship, and purchasing agent for supplies, and was a signatory of the Mayflower Compact in 1621. He died on 8 January 1621 in Plymouth, Massachusetts.

On 24 September 1916, German Zeppelin L32 was shot down by 2nd Lt Frederick Sowrey of the Royal Flying Corps. The airship narrowly missed Billericay High Street and crashed in fields just off from Greens Farm lane Great Burstead, killing all 22 crew.

The Great Burstead cricket team was formed in 1956. It has recently merged with East Hanningfield CC but will continue to play in the T Rippon Mid-Essex League.

South Green, to the north-east of the old village centre of Great Burstead, is sometimes described as a separate village and sometimes as a residential area of Great Burstead. South Green has the main parade of shops for the area and a village green. In medieval times the green was likely to have been used for archery practice.

Great Burstead village and South Green both form part of the Billericay built up area as defined by the Office for National Statistics.

=== Administrative history ===
Great Burstead was an ancient parish in the Barstable hundred of Essex. As well as the village itself, the parish also included an extensive surrounding area, including the town of Billericay. When elected parish and district councils were established in 1894, Great Burstead was given a parish council and included in the Billericay Rural District. In 1934 most of the rural district, including Great Burstead, was converted into the Billericay Urban District. All the parishes in that district were merged into a single parish called Billericay in 1937. The urban district was renamed Basildon in 1955 and was reformed to become the modern Basildon district in 1974, at which point the district also became an unparished area. At the 1931 census (the last before the abolition of the civil parish), Great Burstead had a population of 3,690.

The modern parish of Great Burstead and South Green was formed on 1 September 1996 from part of the unparished area. The new parish covers a smaller area than the pre-1937 parish of Great Burstead, which had also included the town of Billericay.
