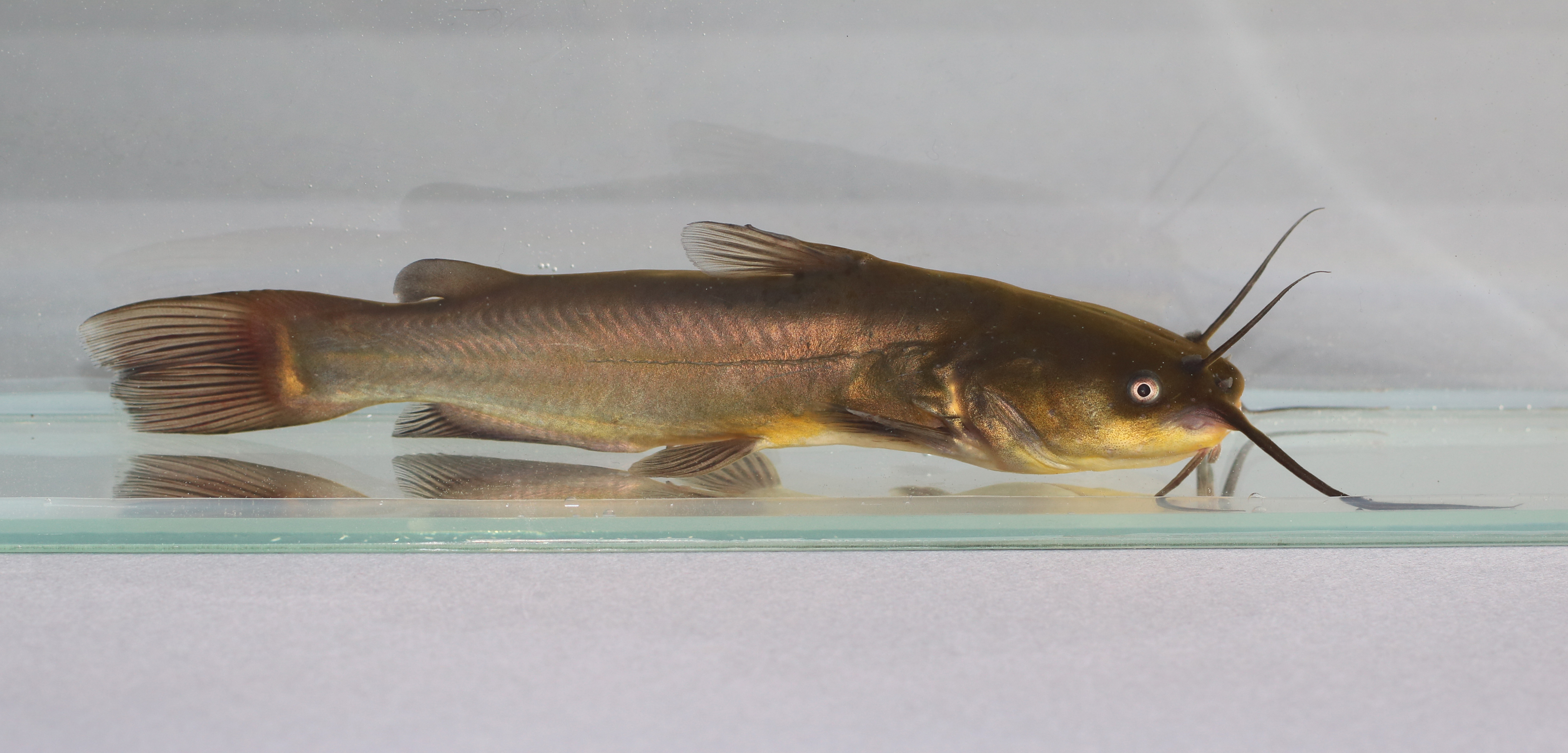

Conservation status
- Least Concern (IUCN 3.1)

Scientific classification
- Kingdom: Animalia
- Phylum: Chordata
- Class: Actinopterygii
- Division: Teleostei
- Order: Siluriformes
- Family: Ictaluridae
- Genus: Ameiurus
- Species: A. melas

Binomial name
- Ameiurus melas Rafinesque, 1820
- Native range of A. melas

Synonyms
- Silurus melas Rafinesque, 1820; Ictalurus melas (Rafinesque, 1820); Ameiurus vulgaris (Thompson, 1842)

= Black bullhead =

Species of fish

The black bullhead or black bullhead catfish (Ameiurus melas) is a species of bullhead catfish. Like other bullhead catfish, it has the ability to thrive in waters that are low in oxygen, brackish, turbid, and/or very warm. It also has barbels located near its mouth, a broad head, spiny fins, and no scales. It can be identified from other bullheads as the barbels are black, and it has a tan crescent around the tail. Its caudal fin is truncated (squared off at the corners). Like virtually all catfish, it is nocturnal, preferring to feed at night, although young feed during the day. It generally does not get as large as the channel or blue catfish, with average adult weights are in the 1-to-2-pound (0.45 to 0.91 kg) range, and almost never as large as 4 pounds (1.8 kg). It has a typical length of 6–14 inches (15–36 cm), with the largest specimen being 24 inches (61 cm), making it the largest of the bullheads. It is typically black or dark brown on the dorsal side of its body and yellow or white on the ventral side.

== Description ==
Like most of the bullheads and flathead catfish, the black bullhead has a squared tail fin, in contrast to the forked tail of channel and blue catfish. It is a bottom-rover fish, meaning it is well-adapted for bottom living. It is typically dorsoventrally flattened, and has a slightly humped back. Its color depends on the area where it is taken, but it generally is darker than brown or yellow bullheads (A. nebulosus and A. natalis, respectively). It can be distinguished from the flathead catfish (Pylodictis olivaris) by the fact that the black bullhead's lower lip does not protrude past the upper lip. Distinguishing it from the brown bullhead is a bit more difficult, depending on the area where it is caught, but a distinguishing detail between the two includes weak serration on the pectoral spine of the black bullhead, while the brown's corresponding spine is more strongly barbed. The anal fin of the black bullhead also has a gray base, and its caudal fin often has a pale bar at its base. The brown bullhead is also typically mottled brown and gray-green dorsally, instead of the darker black. Both the black and brown bullheads can easily be distinguished from the yellow bullhead by the color of the barbels on their chin: the yellow bullhead has white barbels under its mouth. Black bullhead are typically 165–229 millimetres (6.5–9.0 in) long.

At the base of their pectoral and dorsal fins are spines, which they can use as spurs to cut predators.

== Habitat and distribution ==
Black bullheads are native to the Mississippi and Ohio river basins and are widespread throughout the central and southern United States. They are largely absent from the Atlantic coastal drainages of the eastern US. They typically inhabit stagnant or slow-moving waters with soft bottoms, such as lakes, ponds, oxbows, and low-gradient streams. They have been known to congregate in confined spaces, such as lake outlets or under dams.

They are very tolerant fish, and are able to live in muddy water, with warmer temperatures and in water with lower levels of oxygen, which reduce competition from other fish. They are consistently more tolerant of high water silting, water pollution, and warm water temperatures than other bullhead species.

=== Introduced range ===
Black bullheads occur as an invasive species in large parts of Europe. Due to the significant negative impacts of its introduction to the ecosystem, the European Union has included it in the list of invasive alien species of Union concern and hence cannot be imported, bred, transported, commercialized, or intentionally released into the environment in any of its member states.

In the United Kingdom, the species has been eradicated by use of rotenone biocide. It was only found in one place, Lake Meadows, Billericay, Essex, and they grew to a maximum weight of 1.19 pounds (.539 kg).

== Ecology ==
Black bullhead are gregarious fish and typically forage and move in schools. They remain inactive within beds of vegetation by day, and forage mainly at night.

=== Diet ===
Black bullheads are omnivorous, so they eat almost anything, from grains and other plant matter to insects, dead or living fish, and crustaceans. Midge larvae and other young insects are the primary diet for adult bullheads. Black bullheads have been known to eat small fish and fish eggs as well. They have short, pointed, conical teeth, formed in multiple rows called cardiform teeth. Black bullheads have no scales; instead, they have about 100,000 taste receptors placed all over their bodies. Many of these are located on the barbels near their mouths. The receptors help the fish to identify food in their dark habitats. During the winter, black bullheads decrease food intake, and may stop eating altogether. Instead, they bury themselves around the shore line of the lake in debris, with only their gills exposed. This "hibernation" allows them to survive conditions of low oxygen and low temperature.

=== Reproduction ===
Black bullheads start to spawn in April and continue through June. In Wisconsin and similar latitudes, spawning has been recorded as late as early August.

During mating, the females scoop out a small hole or depression in mud or sand, typically at a depth between 0.6–1.2 metres (2.0–3.9 ft) under the surface and beneath shelter such as vegetation, woody debris, or overhanging banks. They may also be made within muskrat burrows. Eggs are laid in a gelatinous mass and guarded by both parents, which periodically fan and stir the spawn with their tails and fins. Incubation time is dependent on the water temperature, and typically takes place over five to ten days.

After hatching, young bullhead retain external yolk sacs and remain within the nest. After the fry have fully absorbed their yolk sacs and rise from the substrate, they remain in a compact cloud-like school. The parents continue to follow them at first, and circle around the school to keep it compact. The parents abandon their offspring when they reach around 25 millimetres (0.98 in) of length, at which point the fry typically move into shallower water. As juveniles, the diet of black bullheads consists primarily of very small aquatic invertebrates, such as cladocerans and midge larvae.

== Angling ==
Considered rough fish, black bullheads are not as popular for sport fishing as their larger relatives, channel catfish, blue catfish, and flat head catfish. However, they have pale flesh and make excellent table fare when water quality is good despite their small size. As with channel catfish, the flesh around the bellies and gills of larger individuals can be strong tasting due to yellow fat, but these flavors can be avoided by removing the fatty portions of a large specimen when cleaning. They are the largest of the bullheads and are one of several catfish informally referred to as mud catfish.

They have been introduced in many areas of the US because of their ability to survive (and even thrive) in less than ideal conditions, but they are seldom used in active stocking programs due to their relatively low desirability. Fisheries experts tend to not recommend them because they compete with bluegill and channel catfish for food and do not grow as fast or get as big as channel catfish. For that reason, finding them commercially for pond stocking is difficult. That said, in clean water, meat quality is very good, and unlike channel catfish, black bullheads reproduce and indefinitely maintain healthy populations without restocking in ponds populated with bass and crappie. In fact, as with bluegill, a pond with black bullhead in it needs a predator species such as bass to keep the bullhead population under control. Due to their ability to reproduce in a pond with bass, bullheads are the best catfish for mixed-species ponds that are not fished out and restocked regularly.

Black bullheads can be caught using similar techniques as for channel or blue catfish, although their small size may require smaller bait and hooks. They respond well to earthworms and tend to feed higher up in the water column than channel catfish. Like most catfish, they are most active at night, and tend to be less active during the day, bedding under piers or in shady shore areas.

In some areas of little to no fishing pressure, black bullheads have been found to be more aggressive and have been caught while casting and retrieving metal spoon lures.

== See also ==
- Bullhead catfish (general)
