= Mill Meadows =

Mill Meadows may refer to

- Mill Meadows, Billericay
- Mill Meadows, Henley-on-Thames
