= Kater =

Kater may refer to:

== People ==
- Fritz Kater, German trade unionist
- Henry Kater, German-British physicist
- Michael Hans Kater (1937–2025), German-Canadian historian
- Norman William Kater (1861–1930), Australian physician pastoralist politician
- Peter Kater, American pianist

== Other uses ==
- Kater, German title of the 2016 Austrian film Tomcat

== See also ==
- Cater (disambiguation)
- Kata people, also known as Katir or Kator
- Katoor dynasty, also known as Kator or Katur
