= Listed buildings in Billericay =

Non-Civil Parish in Essex, England

Billericay is a town in the Borough of Basildon of Essex, England. It contains 46 listed buildings that are recorded in the National Heritage List for England. Of these three are grade II* and 43 are grade II.

This list is based on the information retrieved online from Historic England.

== Key ==
Grade	Criteria
I	Buildings that are of exceptional interest
II*	Particularly important buildings of more than special interest
II	Buildings that are of special interest

== Listing ==
Name	Grade	Location	Type	Completed (Note: The date given is the date used by Historic England as significant for the initial building or that of an important part in the structure's description.)	Date designated	Grid ref. (Note: The grid reference is based on the British national grid reference system, sometimes known as OSGB36, used by the Ordnance Survey.) Geo-coordinates	Notes	Entry number (Note: The "List Entry Number" is a unique number assigned to each listed building and scheduled monument by Historic England.)	Image	Wikidata
Billericay War Memorial	II		war memorial		6 July 2004	TQ6748494691; 51°37′34″N 0°25′06″E		1431204	Billericay War Memorial More images	Q26677700
The Chequers Inn Including 1 Chapel Street	II	1, Chapel Street	inn		4 July 1955	TQ6749894691; 51°37′34″N 0°25′06″E		1122264	The Chequers Inn Including 1 Chapel Street More images	Q26415406
Number 3 and Number 5 (st Aubyns)	II	3 and 5 (st Aubyns), Chapel Street			4 July 1955	TQ6749894681; 51°37′34″N 0°25′06″E		1122248	Upload Photo	Q26415394
7 and 9, Chapel Street	II	7 and 9, Chapel Street			10 December 1973	TQ6749894671; 51°37′33″N 0°25′06″E		1338376	Upload Photo	Q26622706
11 and 13, Chapel Street	II	11 and 13, Chapel Street			10 December 1973	TQ6749794664; 51°37′33″N 0°25′06″E		1122249	Upload Photo	Q26415395
54 and 56, Chapel Street	II	54 and 56, Chapel Street			28 November 1986	TQ6749394416; 51°37′25″N 0°25′06″E		1338398	Upload Photo	Q26622723
The Old Vicarage and Attached Wall, Gatepiers and Gate	II	Gatepiers And Gate, Chapel Street			22 October 1986	TQ6748994461; 51°37′27″N 0°25′06″E		1122211	Upload Photo	Q26415353
Hurlocks Farmhouse	II	Greens Farm Lane			24 October 1980	TQ6831494525; 51°37′28″N 0°25′49″E		1122209	Upload Photo	Q26415350
12, High Street	II	12, High Street			4 August 1971	TQ6754094813; 51°37′38″N 0°25′09″E		1122262	Upload Photo	Q26415404
22, High Street	II	22, High Street			4 July 1955	TQ6753194772; 51°37′37″N 0°25′08″E		1170052	Upload Photo	Q26463319
24, High Street	II	24, High Street			4 August 1971	TQ6752394765; 51°37′36″N 0°25′08″E		1122263	Upload Photo	Q26415405
38, High Street	II	38, High Street			4 July 1955	TQ6750794722; 51°37′35″N 0°25′07″E		1170061	Upload Photo	Q26463330
40, High Street	II	40, High Street			4 July 1955	TQ6750694715; 51°37′35″N 0°25′07″E		1338383	Upload Photo	Q26622711
41, High Street	II	41, High Street			4 July 1955	TQ6749494768; 51°37′36″N 0°25′06″E		1122268	Upload Photo	Q26415411
43, High Street	II	43, High Street			4 July 1955	TQ6749194759; 51°37′36″N 0°25′06″E		1170121	Upload Photo	Q26463451
Church House	II	46, High Street			6 January 1975	TQ6747394658; 51°37′33″N 0°25′05″E		1122265	Upload Photo	Q26415408
51, High Street	II	51, High Street			4 July 1955	TQ6745794745; 51°37′36″N 0°25′04″E		1338386	Upload Photo	Q26622714
57-61, High Street	II	57-61, High Street	building		4 July 1955	TQ6746894701; 51°37′34″N 0°25′05″E		1122269	57-61, High Street More images	Q26415412
63, High Street	II	63, High Street			7 September 1972	TQ6745894689; 51°37′34″N 0°25′04″E		1170126	Upload Photo	Q26463454
72, High Street	II	72, High Street			22 October 1970	TQ6744094593; 51°37′31″N 0°25′03″E		1306211	Upload Photo	Q26593012
74a, 74 and 74b, High Street	II	74a, 74 and 74b, High Street			22 October 1970	TQ6744094586; 51°37′31″N 0°25′03″E		1338384	Upload Photo	Q26622712
75-79, High Street	II	75-79, High Street			6 January 1975	TQ6743894641; 51°37′32″N 0°25′03″E		1122227	Upload Photo	Q26415371
Offices of North Thames Gas Board	II	91, High Street	building		4 August 1971	TQ6740994594; 51°37′31″N 0°25′02″E		1122228	Offices of North Thames Gas Board More images	Q26415372
93 and 95, High Street	II	93 and 95, High Street			6 January 1975	TQ6740394582; 51°37′31″N 0°25′01″E		1338405	Upload Photo	Q26622726
98, High Street	II	98, High Street			4 August 1971	TQ6739494502; 51°37′28″N 0°25′01″E		1122266	Upload Photo	Q26415409
Foxcroft	II	100, High Street			4 August 1971	TQ6738894488; 51°37′28″N 0°25′00″E		1306221	Upload Photo	Q26593021
106, High Street	II	106, High Street			4 August 1971	TQ6736894459; 51°37′27″N 0°24′59″E		1338385	Upload Photo	Q26622713
108, High Street	II	108, High Street			4 August 1971	TQ6736294435; 51°37′26″N 0°24′59″E		1122267	Upload Photo	Q26415410
The Red Lion Inn	II	113, High Street	pub		6 January 1975	TQ6735394499; 51°37′28″N 0°24′59″E		1338406	The Red Lion Inn More images	Q26622727
131 and 133, High Street	II	131 and 133, High Street			4 July 1955	TQ6734094388; 51°37′24″N 0°24′58″E		1122229	Upload Photo	Q26415374
Pair of K6 Telephone Kiosks	II	136 High Street, High Street			4 January 2012	TQ6736194328; 51°37′22″N 0°24′59″E		1403108	Upload Photo	Q26675570
137, High Street	II	137, High Street			6 January 1975	TQ6734294362; 51°37′24″N 0°24′58″E		1338407	Upload Photo	Q26622728
The White Hart Public House	II	138, High Street			20 November 1972	TQ6736494306; 51°37′22″N 0°24′59″E		1170117	Upload Photo	Q26463440
Three Horseshoes House	II	139, High Street			4 August 1971	TQ6734294353; 51°37′23″N 0°24′58″E		1122230	Upload Photo	Q26415375
Burghstead House	II*	143, High Street	house		4 July 1955	TQ6732694333; 51°37′23″N 0°24′57″E		1122231	Burghstead House More images	Q17557044
Church of St Mary Magdalene	II*	High Street	church building		4 July 1955	TQ6748494671; 51°37′33″N 0°25′06″E		1170075	Church of St Mary Magdalene More images	Q17557066
K6 Telephone Kiosk (adjoining Number 96)	II	High Street			17 February 1989	TQ6739094515; 51°37′28″N 0°25′01″E		1235002	Upload Photo	Q26528368
1-5, Norsey Road	II	1-5, Norsey Road			6 January 1975	TQ6758394881; 51°37′40″N 0°25′11″E		1122240	Upload Photo	Q26415384
6, 8 and 10, Norsey Road	II*	6, 8 and 10, Norsey Road			27 January 1988	TQ6758594868; 51°37′40″N 0°25′11″E		1338399	Upload Photo	Q17557083
Lodge to St Andrews Hospital	II	Norsey Road			6 January 1975	TQ6768594965; 51°37′43″N 0°25′17″E		1122241	Upload Photo	Q26415385
St Andrews Hospital (those Parts Formerly the Billericay Union Workhouse	II	Norsey Road			6 January 1975	TQ6768995043; 51°37′45″N 0°25′17″E		1305881	Upload Photo	Q26592708
Locker's Hall	II	Southend Road			4 August 1971	TQ6755294077; 51°37′14″N 0°25′08″E		1305834	Upload Photo	Q26592664
South Lodge	II	Southend Road			6 January 1975	TQ6758194028; 51°37′12″N 0°25′10″E		1122245	Upload Photo	Q26415390
Great Blunts Farmhouse	II	Stock Road			4 July 1955	TQ6826797083; 51°38′51″N 0°25′51″E		1122206	Upload Photo	Q26415348
Hill House	II	Stock Road			10 October 1986	TQ6772095348; 51°37′55″N 0°25′19″E		1122210	Upload Photo	Q26415351
Hill House Cottage	II	Stock Road			16 April 1973	TQ6771195292; 51°37′53″N 0°25′19″E		1305853	Upload Photo	Q26592682

== See also ==
- Grade I listed buildings in Essex
- Grade II* listed buildings in Essex

== Sources ==
- Bettley, James; Pevsner, Nikolaus (2007) [1954], Essex, The Buildings of England, New Haven and London: Yale University Press, ISBN 978-0-300-11614-4
