= Cater =

Cater may refer to:

- Catering, the business of providing food services at a remote site

== Buildings ==
- Cater Hall, a historic building at Auburn University in Alabama, United States
- Cater Museum, a museum in Billericay, Essex, England

== Companies and organizations ==
- Cater Allen, a British private bank
- Cater Brothers, a former British supermarket chain

== People ==
=== Surname ===
- Monte Cater (born 1949), American football coach
- Danny Cater (born 1940), American Major League Baseball player
- Douglass Cater (1923–1995), American journalist
- Eugene R. Cater (1923–1990), American politician
- Jack Cater (1922–2002), British colonial administrator, Chief Secretary of Hong Kong from 1978 to 1981
- John Cater (1932–2009), English actor
- Martin Čater (born 1992), Slovenian alpine ski racer
- Mojca Cater (born 1970), Canadian swimmer
- Nick Cater, Australian journalist
