= Billericay =

Town and civil parish in Essex, England

Coordinates: 51.628°N 0.4184°E

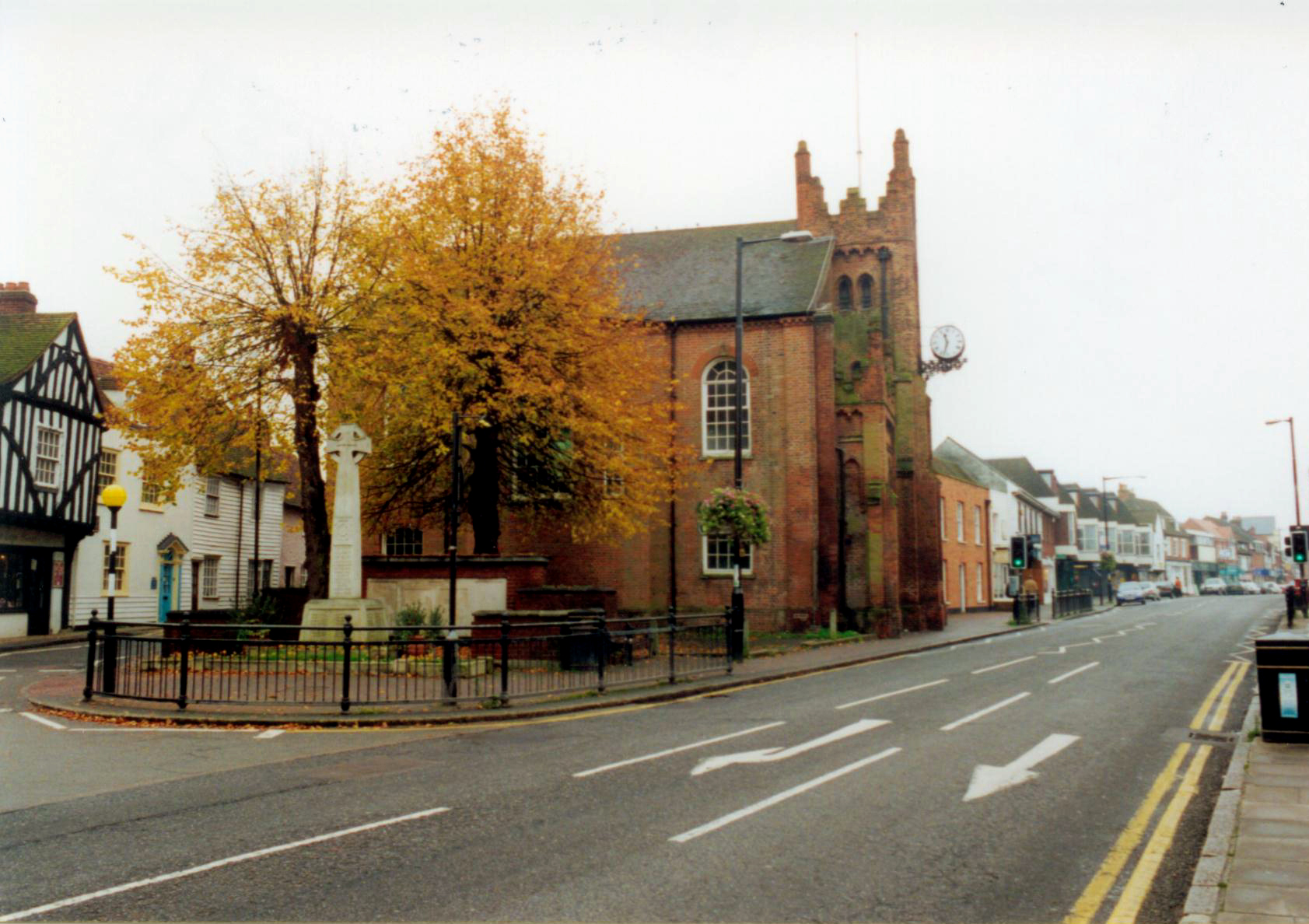
- High Street and St Mary Magdalen Church

- Location within the United Kingdom
- Interactive map of Billericay
- Population: 28,562 (Parish, 2021); (Note: To get individual parish data, use the query function on table PP002.); 34,075 (Built up area, 2021)
- OS grid reference: TQ675945
- Civil parish: Billericay
- District: Borough of Basildon
- Shire county: Essex
- Country: England
- Sovereign state: United Kingdom
- Post town: BILLERICAY
- Postcode district: CM11, CM12
- Dialling code: 01277
- UK Parliament: Basildon and Billericay

Billericay (/bɪləˈrɪkiː/ BIL-ə-RIK-ee) is a historic market town and civil parish in the Borough of Basildon, Essex, England. It lies 23 miles (37 km) east of the City of London. At the 2021 census, the parish had a population of 28,562 and the built-up area was 34,075.

The town was founded in the 13th century by the Abbot of West Ham, in his Manor of Great Burstead. During the Peasants’ Revolt of 1381, the Essex rebels were defeated in a battle with Richard II's forces in the Battle of Billericay. In 1620, four local people were on board the Mayflower as it sailed to Massachusetts, to establish the first English settlement in what would become the north of the United States. The town has long taken a pride in this connection; many businesses and other organisations use the name Mayflower, with the town council and other local organisations using it as their emblem.

== Toponymy ==
The origin of the name Billericay is unclear. It was first recorded as Byllyrica in 1291. The urban settlement, which was within the manor and parish of Great Burstead, was one of many founded in the late 13th century in an already densely populated rural landscape. Several suggestions for the origin of the place name include:

- Villa Erica (Heather Villa): suggesting a Romano-British origin
- Bellerīca: a medieval Latin word meaning 'dyehouse or tanhouse'
- Billers: a traditional name for watercress, for which Bilbrook in Somerset and Staffordshire are named. Watercress was farmed in Billericay springs during the 20th century.

Although the precise etymology of the name is not known, England has places similarly named:

- Billerica, Kent: A deserted town adjacent to the settlement of Court-up-Street by Port Lympne. Significantly, this is adjacent to a Roman Saxon Shore fort, as well as being on spring lines suitable for growing watercress
- Billerica Farm, near Upton Noble, Somerset: Although this farm might be named after the other Billericas, the site is also close to springs suitable for farming watercress.

The Tudor antiquarian John Leland believed the already-abandoned Billerica in Kent was a variant of Bellocastrum, ‘fair castle’ in Latin. In Billericay, there is a Roman fort at Blunt's Wall Farm; likewise ‘Burh’ gives its name to Great Burstead. This suggests that a Romano-British place name was reused by the Anglo-Saxons following the end of Roman rule in Britain.

== History ==
=== Early history ===
Some of the earliest records of human occupation of Billericay are the burial mounds in Norsey Wood, showing evidence of occupation in the Bronze and Iron Ages. Evidence of a Roman town, subsequently abandoned, were found on the high ground at Billericay School, just south of the High Street during excavations in 1970–71. There may also have been a small cavalry fort at Blunts Wall Farm.

=== Middle Ages ===
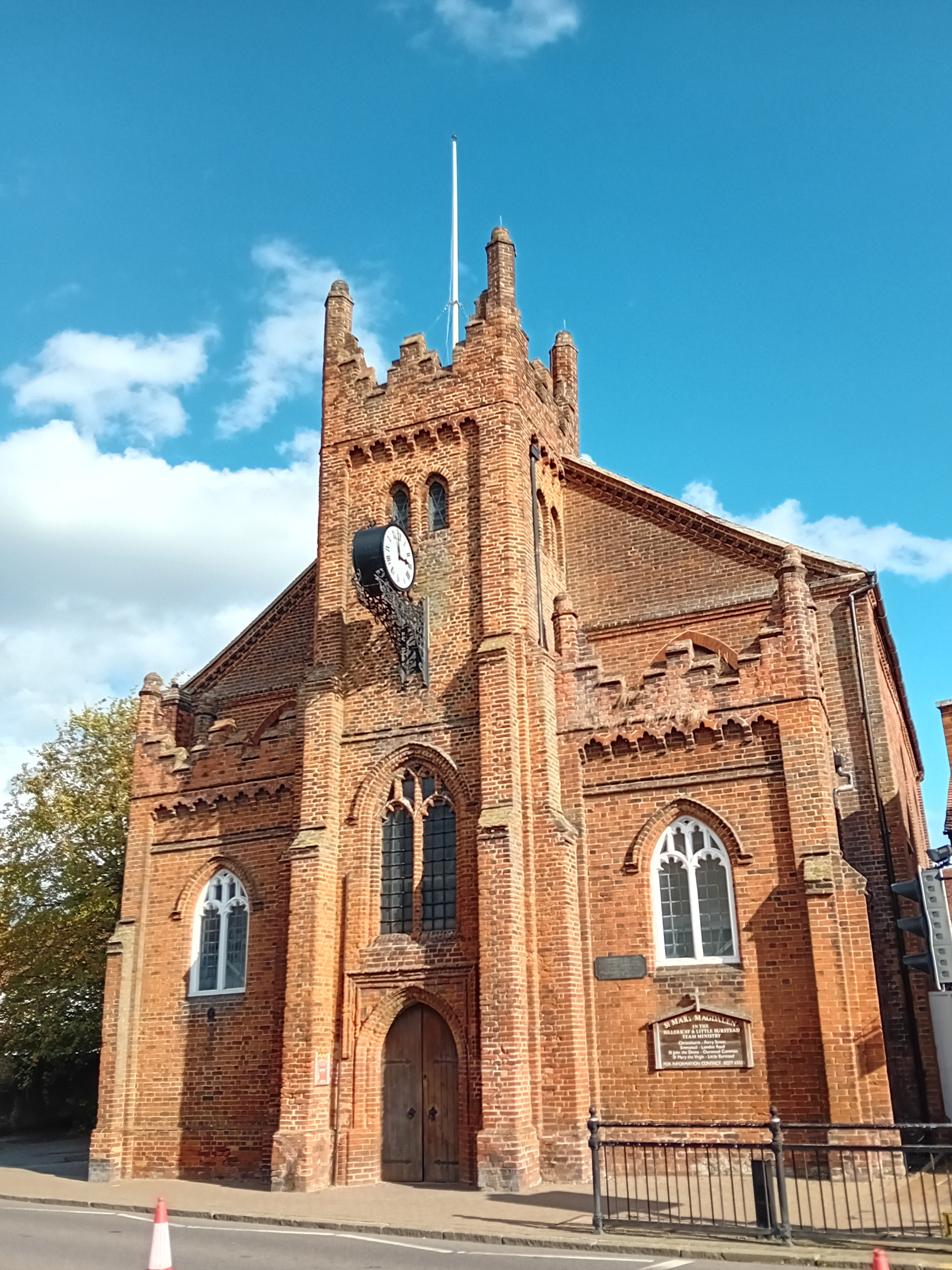
St Mary Magdalen's Church, High Street, with a 15th-century tower and Georgian main building behind it

The town of Billericay was established in the 13th century in the Manor and Parish of Great Burstead. The Manor of Burgestede is first recorded in an Anglo-Saxon will of 975 AD. In the Domesday Book of 1086, two separate manors are recorded as Burghestada. The name Great Burstead is first recorded in the early 13th century, but the division into Great and Little Burstead Manors had happened by the time of the Norman Conquest.

The town of Billericay, first recorded as Byllyrica in 1291, is understood to have been founded in the 13th century by the Abbot of West Ham, head of the Cistercian community of Stratford Langthorne Abbey, 20 miles (32.2 km) away on the Lower Lea, in what is now inner London. The Abbey held the Manor of Great Burstead at the time.

The town was established at the High Street. Like the abandoned Roman settlement just to the south, it benefitted from a prominent position on the high ground forming the watershed on the catchment areas of the rivers Crouch and Wid. It was also on the crossroads (at Sun Corner) of the road from the Thames to Chelmsford (the modern B1007) and the A129 road linking Hutton to Wickford; it is believed that the Crouch may have been navigable as far as Wickford at that time.

At this time, the parish church for Billericay was at St Mary Magdalene, Great Burstead. By the 14th century, a chantry chapel had been built on the High Street, which became a chapel of ease to Great Burstead following the Reformation; it eventually became a parish church in 1844, also dedicated to St Mary Magdalen.

In the 13th and 14th centuries, some pilgrims to Canterbury journeyed via Billericay. Some of them may have spent the night in the town before crossing the river Thames at Tilbury; this may account for the large number of inns.

The town's most notable historical episode was the Battle of Billericay during the Peasants' Revolt of 1381.

=== Tudor period ===
The Wycliffe preachers influenced the town. Four local people (Thomas Watts, Joan Hornes, Elizabeth Thackwell and Margaret Ellis) were burned at the stake. Two other residents, Joan Potter and James Harris, were tortured for their Protestant faith during the reign of Queen Mary.

=== Pilgrim Fathers ===
A meeting of the Pilgrim Fathers, prior to their sailing in the Mayflower, is said to have taken place on the High Street; many local names and much historical imagery reflect this, such as Mayflower House, Mayflower Morris Men, Mayflower Taxis, Mayflower School and Mayflower Hall. Sunnymede school's houses were called Mayflower, Pilgrim and Chantry.

Christopher Martin, who was born in Great Burstead and later became a Billericay goods merchant and property owner, travelled on the Mayflower in 1620; he was the official ship's governor and purchasing agent, procuring ships supplies for the voyage.

The Mayflower ship set sail once the Pilgrim Fathers had all boarded and set to meet the Speedwell in the English Channel; the Speedwell was sailing from the Netherlands. Unfortunately, the Speedwell developed leaks and so the ships headed for the Devon coast to repair her, but this proved impossible; the Mayflower eventually sailed from Plymouth without her.

Four people from Billericay were on board, including Christopher Martin, his wife Mary Prowe, along with Solomon Prowe - her son from her first marriage - and John Langemore, the Martins' servant. All four pilgrims perished after their arrival at Cape Cod, Massachusetts. Martin died of fever on 8 January 1621 and his wife perished in Plymouth in the same year. Both Christopher and Mary are buried in the Cole Hill Burial ground in Plymouth. The unfortunate fate of the would-be pioneers did not deter other inhabitants of Billericay from setting sail for the New World. The town of Billerica, Massachusetts, was established in 1655 by colonists from Billericay and named after their home town in England.

=== Georgian and Victorian eras ===
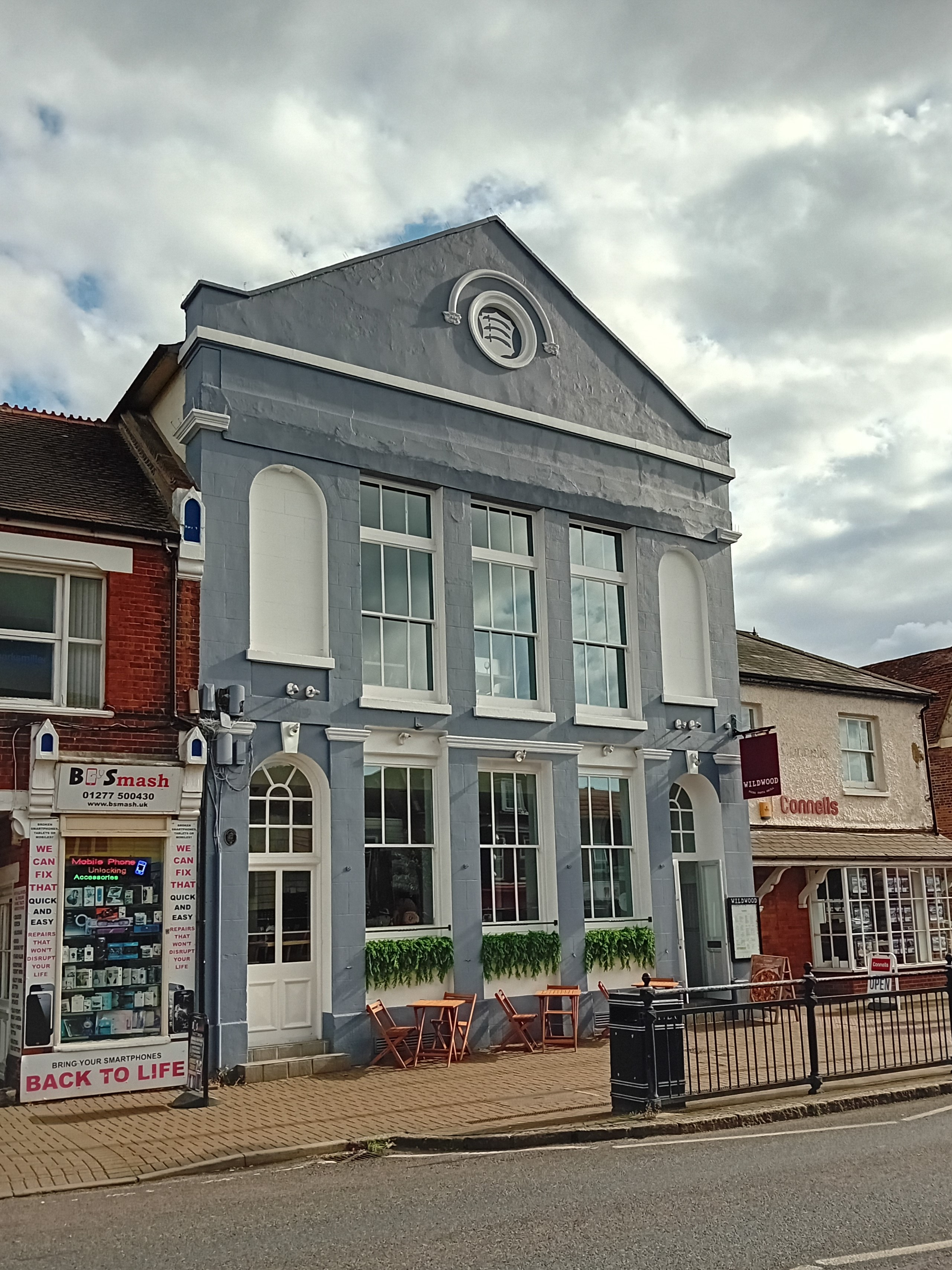
Old Town Hall, 94 High Street, was converted to a restaurant in 2000

In the Georgian period, many excellent examples of the period's houses were built in Billericay. One of those remaining today is Burghstead Lodge in High Street, which used to house the library. The Town Hall was built in 1830 at 94 High Street.

The Billericay Poor Law Union was created in 1835 to serve the town and several surrounding parishes. It built a workhouse in 1840 on Norsey Road. Parts of this building were later incorporated into St Andrew's Hospital.

The population of the town in the 1841 census was 1,824.

The railway arrived in Billericay in 1889; the station is situated on a branch line from the Great Eastern Main Line between Shenfield and Southend-on-Sea. In 1899, Billericay's market, the reason for the town's establishment is recorded for the last time, though there were short-lived revivals.

=== 20th century ===
In 1916, during the First World War, a German Zeppelin airship was shot down during an aerial battle over Billericay. During its fiery demise, it narrowly missed the High Street, crashing into a field off Greens Farm Lane. A plaque was erected at the site in 2016, to commemorate 100 years since the incident. Parts of the aluminium frame can be seen at the Cater Museum in the High Street. Recent research has indicated that this may be identified with the 'ghost Zeppelin' of Tonbridge, which was allegedly seen floating over that town earlier in the day.

The former workhouse became St Andrew's Hospital, which housed the internationally renowned Regional Plastic Surgery and Burns Unit from 1973, until this was relocated to Broomfield Hospital, north of Chelmsford, in April 1998. Most of the hospital was redeveloped subsequently into housing, with the listed old workhouse buildings being converted to residential use.

== Geography ==
=== Open spaces ===
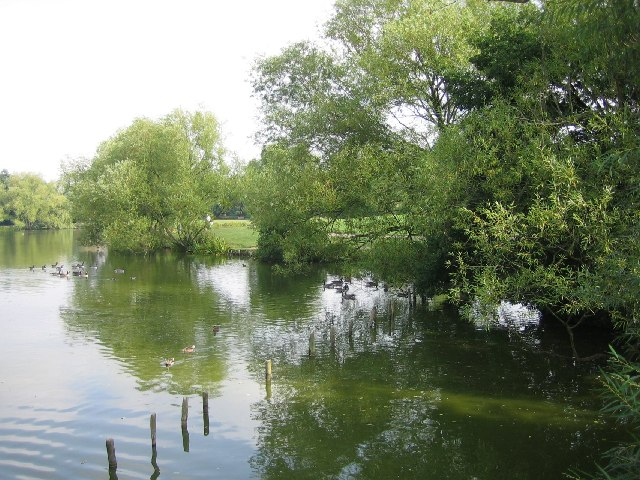
The boating lake at Lake Meadows

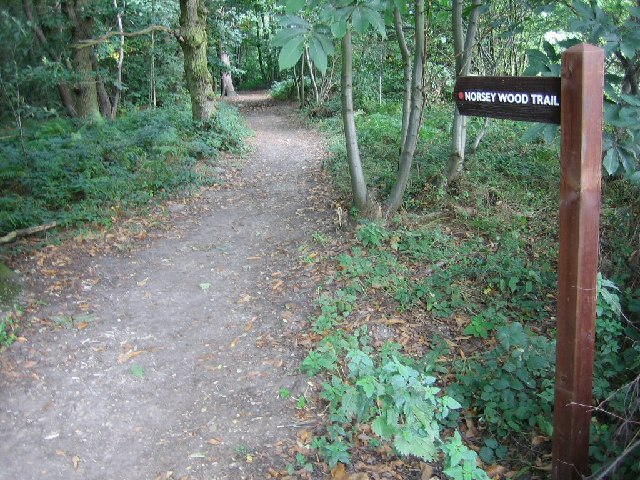
Norsey Wood

Billericay has two main parks: Lake Meadows and the Queen Elizabeth II Playing Field. (Note: This is usually known as Sun Corner)

There are several open spaces on the urban edge:

- Hannakins Farm mixed-use park to the north-west, includes several playing fields
- Mill Meadows on the eastern side of the town
- Norsey Wood, another nature reserve to the north-east
- Queens Park Country Park, also to the north-west, is managed as a local nature reserve.

Norsey Wood and Mill Meadows are green wedges, in that they extend from the open countryside to the centre of town; they are environmentally valuable and sensitive, and have, in part or whole, been designated as Sites of Special Scientific Interest. Centuries of grazing have created the ideal conditions for a diversity of wild flowers, fungi, insects and invertebrates, many of which are very rare.

=== Constituent and neighbouring settlements ===
The Billericay built up area includes the Queen's Park, Sunnymede, Great Burstead, South Green and Noak Hill localities.

Neighbouring settlements include Stock to the north, Ramsden Heath and Ramsden Bellhouse to the east, Basildon to the south, Little Burstead to the south-west, and Havering's Grove to the west.

Billericay is within the London Basin and lies on a mixture of London clay, Claygate Beds and Bagshot Beds on the higher ground. The point where the soils change from sandy to impermeable clay creates springs.

== Governance ==
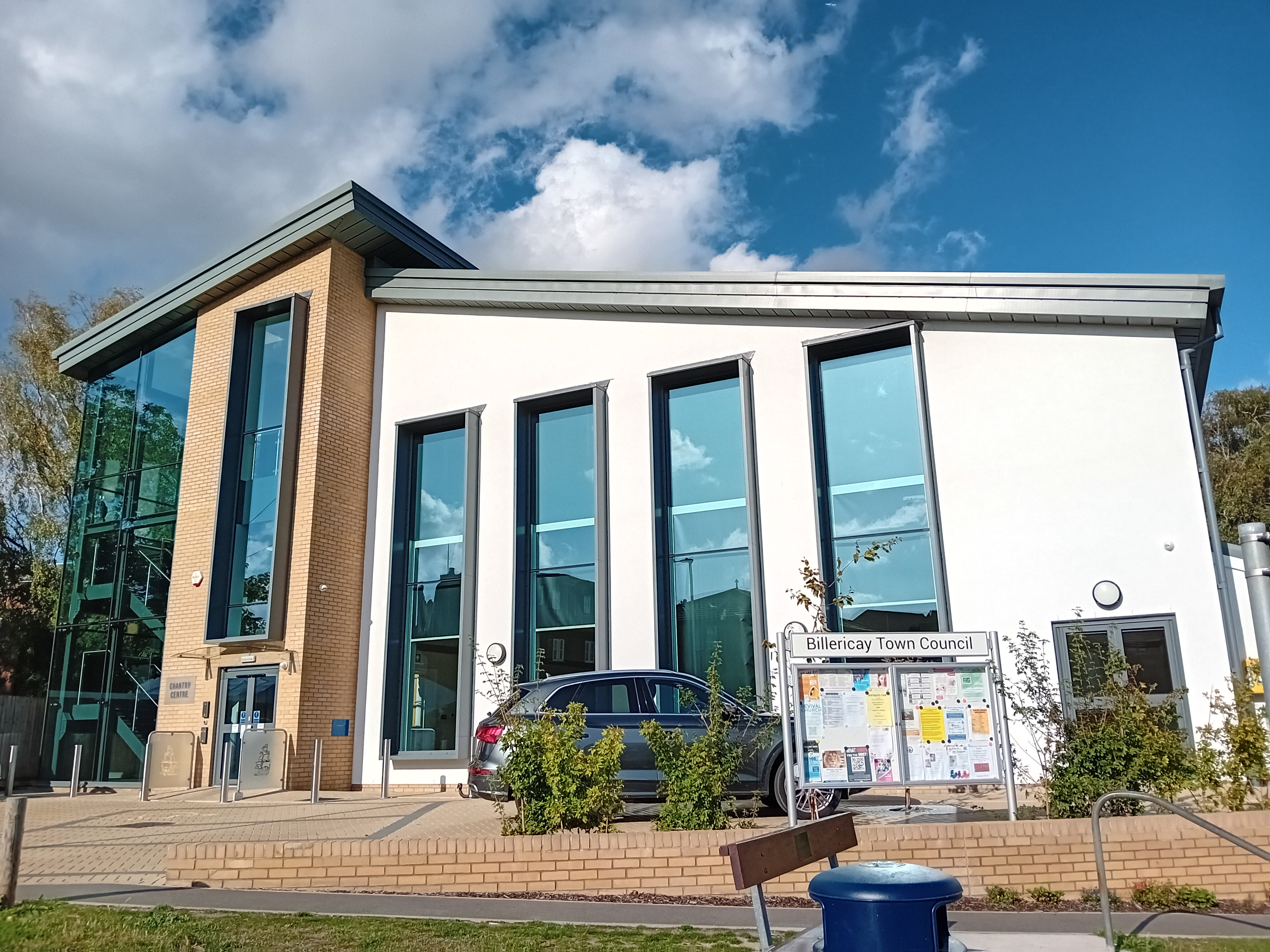
Chantry Centre, the town council's headquarters

Since major boundary changes in Essex for the 2010 general election, Billericay has been part of the Basildon and Billericay parliamentary constituency. The MP is Richard Holden of the Conservative Party.

There are three tiers of local government covering the town, at parish, district and county level: Billericay Town Council, Basildon Borough Council and Essex County Council. The town council has its headquarters at the Chantry Centre on Chantry Drive, which was purpose-built for the council in 2020 and also serves as a community centre. The town council has run a youth town council scheme since 1998, elected in schools around the town.

=== Administrative history ===
The town was historically a chapelry in the ancient parish of Great Burstead. The Billericay Poor Law Union, created in 1835, gradually took on local government powers, becoming a rural sanitary district in 1872; this in turn became the Billericay Rural District in 1894, when a Great Burstead Parish Council was also created covering the parish. The rural district covered a large area stretching as far as Brentwood and Pitsea. In 1934, most of the rural district was reconstituted as Billericay Urban District and the parish councils within the area were abolished. Three years later, all the urban parishes within the district were united into a civil parish of Billericay.

The urban district, but not the parish, was renamed Basildon in 1955, although the council continued to be based at the Town Hall and adjoining offices in Billericay until the early 1960s, when it moved into new premises in Basildon itself. In 1974, through enactment of the Local Government Act 1972, the Basildon Urban District was reconstituted as the modern Basildon district and the civil parish of Billericay was abolished, becoming an unparished area. A new civil parish of Billericay was established in 1996, this time just covering the town itself rather than the whole Basildon district.

== Transport ==
Billericay is a part of the London commuter belt, with a high proportion of people working in the City and other central parts of London.

The town is served by Billericay railway station, which lies on the Shenfield to Southend Line. Services between London Liverpool Street, Shenfield and Southend Victoria are operated by Greater Anglia; some trains in peak hours run to Southminster.

Local bus services are operated by First Essex, which connect the town with Chelmsford, Basildon, Brentwood and Wickford. Many routes connect to the station's bus stop, including service 300 which operates regularly between Basildon and Chelmsford. School services are provided by First Essex and NIBS Buses.

The town was established at the Sun Corner crossroads of two roads:

- B1007 (Note: Higher grade parts of the B1007 are designated the A176.) provides a road link to Basildon, via the A127; it passes from just south of the town centre as Laindon Road, then Sun Corner, and northwards as Billericay's High Street and Stock Road. The road continues north to Chelmsford, via the village of Stock and an interchange to the A12
- A129 provides an east-west link between Hadleigh, Wickford and Shenfield.

== Education ==
Primary schools in the town are: Buttsbury, Brightside, Sunnymede and South Green.

There are two secondary comprehensives: Billericay School and Mayflower High School.

St John's School in an independent school for children up to the age of 18.

== Culture ==
The Cater Museum is a local history museum and charity containing artefacts recording the lives of people in the area. It is housed in an 18th and 19th-century Grade II listed building on the High Street.

The Billericay Community Archive posts photos, memories and history relating to the town and surrounding areas on their website.

In 2015, the Billericay Community Cinema was established; within a year, the not-for-profit and volunteer-based group won a national award: the Best New Film Society at the All Community Cinema Awards. In September 2025, it celebrated its tenth anniversary and won Cinema for All's national Community Award, which recognises outstanding community connection and involvement over the past year; its founder, Adam Adshead, also took home the Outstanding Contribution by an Individual award.

=== In popular culture ===
The town's name was used in the 1977 Ian Dury song, "Billericay Dickie".

The town is described as the Essex location for the BBC TV sitcom Gavin & Stacey, as the home of Gavin Shipman and his parents; however, the filming for scenes actually took place in Wales, including in the town of Dinas Powys in the Vale of Glamorgan.

== Media ==
Local radio stations covering the area are BBC Essex on 95.3 FM, Heart East on 96.3 FM and Phoenix FM on 98 FM, a community radio station which is based in Brentwood.

Local TV coverage is provided by BBC London and ITV London, which is received from the Crystal Palace TV transmitter. Some areas of town can also receive BBC East and ITV Anglia from the Sudbury TV transmitter.

The town is served by the local newspaper, Southend Echo.

== Sport ==
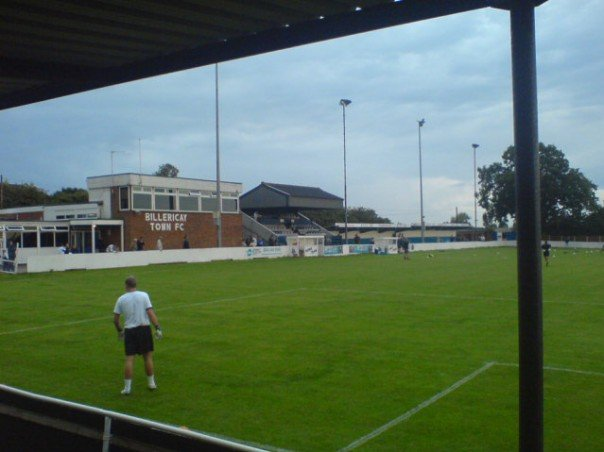
Billericay Town's clubhouse, main stand and the Cowshed at their New Lodge ground, 2007

Billericay Town F.C. is the town's football team that currently plays in the Isthmian League. It is notable for winning the FA Vase trophy three times in 1976, 1977 and 1979.

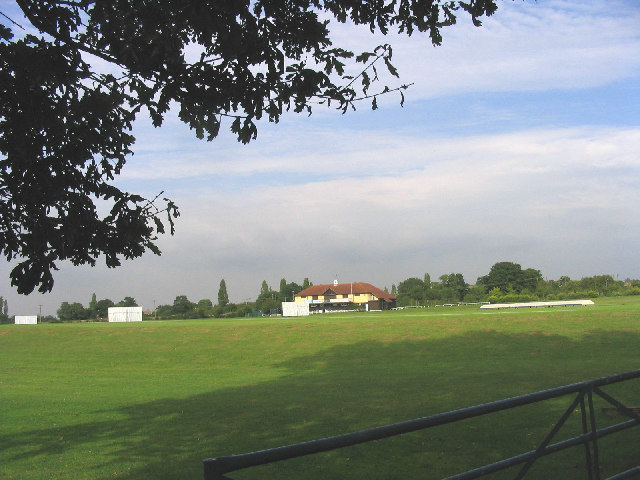
Billericay Cricket Club

The town is also represented by Billericay Rugby Football Club, Billericay Cricket Club, Mayflower Archer and Billericay Striders Running Club.

== Notable people ==
- Neal Asher, science fiction writer, born in Billericay
- Francis Thomas Bacon, engineer, born in Billericay
- Lee Barnard, footballer, went to school in Billericay
- Peter Bone, politician, born in Billericay
- Louise Boyce, model and writer, born in Billericay
- Nick Cater, author and journalist in Australia, born in Billericay
- Daniel Corbett, TV weather forecaster, lived in Billericay as a child
- Robert Denmark, middle- and long-distance athlete
- Justin Edinburgh, footballer, lived in Billericay, played for Tottenham Hotspur; played for and managed Billericay Town
- Lee Evans, comedian, went to school and lives in Billericay
- Mark Foster, swimmer, born in Billericay
- David Gandy, model, born and went to school in Billericay
- Wrey Gardiner, poet, editor and publisher, founded The Grey Walls Press in Billericay
- Teresa Gorman, politician, the constituency's high-profile former MP
- Lee Harrison, footballer, born in Billericay
- Chris Haywood, actor/producer, born in Billericay
- David Hopwood, banker, born in Billericay
- Ralph Izzard, journalist, born in Billericay
- Marshall Jefferson, music producer, lived in Billericay
- Perry McCarthy, racing driver
- Suzanne Maddock, actor, lives in Billericay
- Christopher Martin, Mayflower pilgrim, lived in Billericay
- Alison Moyet, pop singer, born in Billericay
- Richard Osman, TV producer and personality ("Pointless Friend" on BBC show Pointless), born in Billericay
- Kevin Painter, darts player, born in Billericay
- Paul Parker, was raised in Billericay and lived there when he became a professional footballer. He played for Queens Park Rangers and Manchester United.
- Gemma Ray, musician, singer, composer and producer, raised in Billericay
- Charlie Richardson, gangster, lived in Billericay
- Stewart Robson, footballer, born in Billericay
- Joseph Thornton, 19th-century Oxford-based bookseller, born in Billericay
- Russell Tovey, actor, has Billericay as his home town
- Paul Walter, cricketer, born in Billericay
- Patrick W. Welch, painter, born in Billericay
- Charlie Wernham, comedian and comedy actor, born and lives in Billericay
- Ben Wheatley, film director, born in Billericay.
- Freya Godfrey, footballer, born in Billericay

== Twin towns ==
Billericay is twinned with:

- Billerica, Massachusetts, United States, since 1998
- Chauvigny, France, since 2005
- Fishers, Indiana, United States, since 1998.

== See also ==
- Listed buildings in Billericay.
