= Battle of Billericay =

1381 battle during the Peasant's Revolt

- Part of Peasant's Revolt
Date	28 June 1381
Location	Billericay, Essex 51.628°N 0.4184°E
Result	Royal victory

Belligerents
Royal forces	Rebel forces

Commanders and leaders
Earl of Buckingham; Thomas Percy	Unknown

Strength
Unknown	Unknown

Casualties and losses
Unknown, minimal	Around 500

The Battle of Billericay took place on 28 June 1381 when the boy King Richard II's soldiers defeated the Essex rebels adjacent to a wood north-east of Billericay, part of the Peasants' Revolt. This is likely to have been Norsey Wood, which maps of 1593 show to cover the same extent as in the early 20th century.

After the death of Wat Tyler and dispersal of the main rebel army, a summons was sent out in Essex for a mobilisation of rebels at Great Baddow and Rettendon, at threat of arson. Hundreds met and gathered in North-East Billericay on 27 June, digging trenches and chaining carts together.

The King's forces were led by Thomas of Woodstock, the Earl of Buckingham and Sir Thomas Percy. They charged the defensive line as broke it, as the rebels struggled to form a defensive line. Some stayed behind and formed a Saxon fighting ring, as many ran and fled into the woods itself.

It is thought that 500 Essex men were killed and buried at Great Burstead churchyard, and 800 horses were captured. The few survivors who didn't desert tried in vain to rally the people of Colchester to fight, and then to Sudbury, only to find hostile Royal forces. The last survivors then made their way to Huntingdon before making a last stand at Ramsey Abbey where 25 were slain and the remainder became outlaws.

The details comprising this overview have been summarised from a piece written for the Norsey Wood Society newsletter by Billericay historian Julian Whybra.

His ultimate sources were the Westminster Chronicle attributed to Robert of Reading, and the Historia Anglicana by Thomas Walsingham.
