= Lake Meadows =

Park in Billericay, Essex, England

Coordinates: 51.634°N 0.417°E

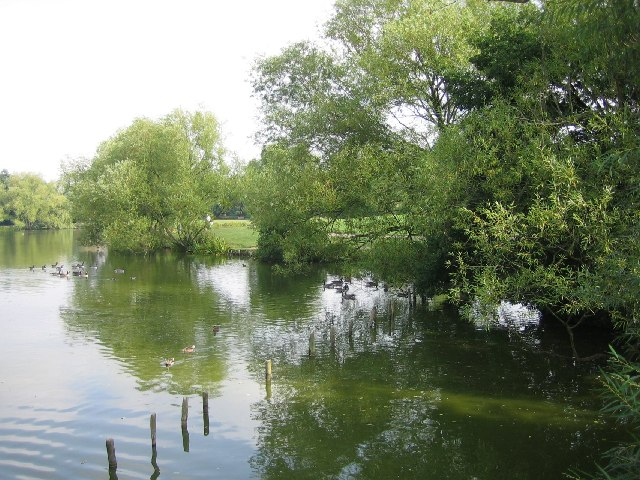
- Lake Meadows
- Interactive map of Lake Meadows
- Location: Billericay, Essex
- Area: 40 acres (16 ha)
- Open: All year

Lake Meadows is a park in Billericay, Essex, England. It is the site of many local events, including Billericay Fireworks and small-scale concerts. The Billericay fireworks are the largest firework display in Essex. As a concert venue, Lake Meadows has a capacity of 5,000.

There is 40 acres of parkland, fishing lakes and golf apparatus as well as a cafe, which is open from April to October.

The Friends of Lake Meadows are a voluntary organisation working with Basildon Council, Billericay Town Council and the Billericay community to promote public interest in the mark and help maintain it.
