= Cater Museum =

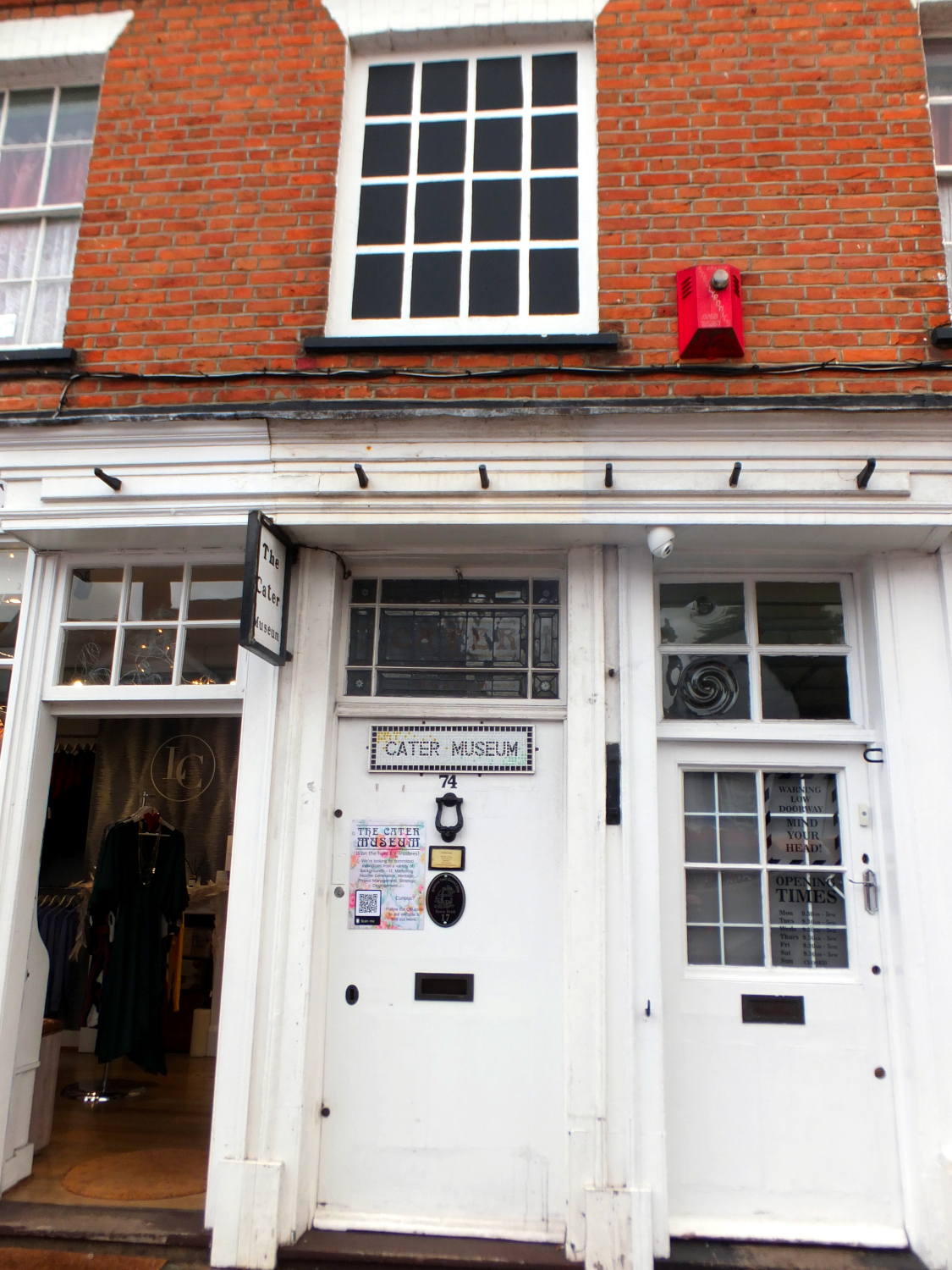
- The Cater Museum in Billericay High Street
- Established: 7 May 1960
- Location: 74 High Street, Billericay, England
- Coordinates: 51.625231°N 0.417476°E
- Type: Local museum
- Website: catermuseum.co.uk

The Cater Museum is a small local museum in Billericay, Essex county, England. The museum was established by Alice May Cater, in honour of her late husband William Alexander Cater, a local antiquarian. It was opened to the public on 7 May 1960.

== History ==
The museum is a registered charity and is located at 74 High Street, Billericay. It lies within a Grade II listed, 18th-century, red-brick-fronted building, which was previously a shop and the home of a saddle and harness maker.

In 2002, a Victorian kitchen garden was opened at the rear of the museum where a number of Elizabethan herbs were planted. In 2008, the museum received £41,000 of National Lottery funding to carry out renovation of the rear of the building to restore it to its original 18th-century character. While this renovation was being carried out, a number of artefacts were discovered in the garden, some dating from around the 1860s. Items included Victorian pipes, ginger beer jars and medicine bottles; many of these were added to the museum's collection.

== Collections ==
The museum's collections previously belonged to the Cater family, the museum's first curator Harry Richman, Anthony Nicholls and A. Basil Brooks.

The museum stores numerous local artefacts over three floors, including information on local families and buildings. Amongst the artefacts are: reports of the Zeppelin that was downed in the area during World War I; the remains of a two-headed lamb born in the area; and the door of the house once owned by Christopher Martin, who was a passenger aboard the Mayflower.
