= Westminster Chronicle =

An important historical document for the reign of Richard II, the chronicle written at Westminster Abbey covers the years from 1381 to 1394. The chronicle is in Latin.

== Editions and translations ==
- The Westminster Chronicle, 1381-1394, ed. and trans. by L. C. Hector and Barbara F. Harvey, Oxford Medieval Texts (Oxford: Clarendon Press, 1982).
