= Louise Boyce =

British model, content creator and author

- Born: Louise MacCallum; 1980 (age 45–46); East Sheen, London
- Education: Waldegrave School, Twickenham
- Occupations: Model, content creator, presenter
- Spouse: Jesse Boyce (m. 2014)
- Children: 3
- Modeling information
- Height: 5 ft 10 in (178 cm)
- Hair color: Blonde
- Eye color: Blue
- Website: mamastillgotit.com

Louise Boyce (born 1980) is a British fashion model, content creator and author known primarily for her parenting-focused online persona, Mama Still Got It. Her debut book, Mama Still Got It: How to Make It Through the Calpol Years Without Losing Yourself (2023), reached the Sunday Times bestseller list in the UK.

== Early life and career ==
Louise Boyce was born and raised in London, England. She began modeling at age 15 and in 1996 was crowned European New Face Model of the year. In 1998, she moved to Sydney, Australia to work as a model. The pressures of the fashion industry led her to develop an eating disorder (bulimia) during her late teens. At the age of 18, she decided to leave her agency and take a break from modeling to focus on recovery.

Boyce resumed her modeling career in 2001 as a curve model and worked for fashion outlets such as Marks & Spencer, Evans, and H&M. Later on, she worked as a commercial and catalog model.

In the late 2010s, Boyce developed the online persona "Mama Still Got It" establishing both an Instagram account and blog focused on her experiences as a mother. Her area of specialism often addresses subjects such as the mental load of motherhood and body image, using humor and direct commentary.

In 2019, during her third pregnancy, Boyce initiated the "Push It Out" campaign, highlighting the advertising industry's practice of using non-pregnant models with foam pregnancy bumps in maternity promotions. The campaign led some retailers, such as ASOS, to include disclaimers clarifying the use of artificial pregnancy bumps.

During the COVID-19 pandemic, Boyce began posting short sketches and parody videos depicting everyday parenting challenges. A recurring figure in these clips is "Bernie," a toddler alter ego she portrays using small plastic hands, which attracted considerable attention from parents online.

In 2021, Boyce launched the "Mama Still Got It" podcast, inviting parents and subject-matter experts to discuss parenting-related topics, from maternal identity to beauty advice. In 2023, she appeared on BBC Radio 4's Woman's Hour to discuss topics related to motherhood and social media.

== Writing ==
In June 2023, Boyce released her first book, Mama Still Got It: How to Make It Through the Calpol Years Without Losing Yourself, published by HarperCollins. The book is a part-memoir, part comedic guide to the school year in a parent's life. It chronicles a year of parenting milestones and mishaps – from the optimism of back-to-school September, through holiday chaos, to summer break, with self-deprecating humor and honesty. Mama Still Got It was well received, entering The Sunday Times bestseller list.
