= Little Burstead =

Village in Essex, England

Coordinates: 51.598030°N 0.407800°E

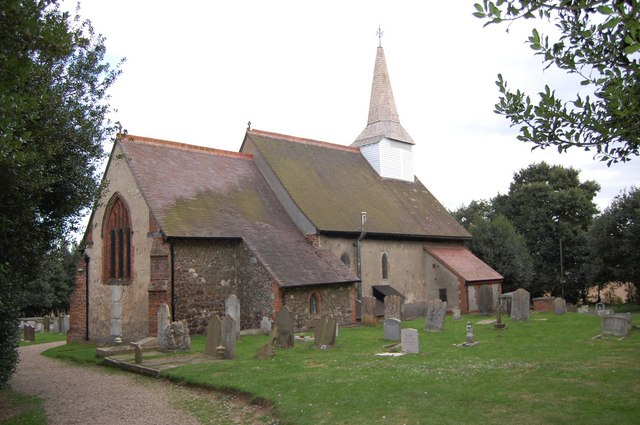
- Parish Church of St Mary The Virgin

- Location within Essex
- Population: 419 (Parish, 2021)
- OS grid reference: TQ668915
- Civil parish: Little Burstead
- District: Basildon
- Shire county: Essex
- Region: East
- Country: England
- Sovereign state: United Kingdom
- Post town: Billericay
- Postcode district: CM12
- Dialling code: 01277
- Police: Essex
- Fire: Essex
- Ambulance: East of England
- UK Parliament: Basildon and Billericay
- Website: Little Burstead Parish Council

Little Burstead is a village and civil parish in the Basildon borough of Essex, England. It lies 1.5 miles (2 km) south of Billericay, its post town, and 3 miles (5 km) north-west of the centre of Basildon. At the 2021 census the parish had a population of 419.

== History ==
The name Burstead is Old English and means a fortified place.

The Domesday Book of 1086 lists two estates or manors at a vill called Burghesteda in the Barstable Hundred of Essex. The book does not otherwise distinguish between the manors, but historians have deduced that the manor held by Odo of Bayeux was Great Burstead, and the manor held by the Bishop of London was Little Burstead. The Bishop of London's manor at that time had nine households and was reported to have been held by a Godwin of Benfield prior to the Norman Conquest of 1066.

A church, dedicated to St Mary, was built at Little Burstead in the 12th century, and the manor of Little Burstead came to be a parish.

In the 19th century, the parish had an area of 1,829 acres and a population in 1870 of 186 (37 houses).

== Governance ==
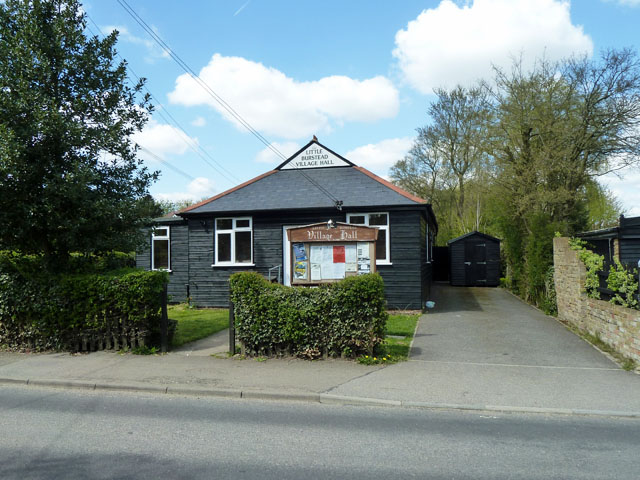
Little Burstead Village Hall

There are three tiers of local government covering Little Burstead, at parish, district, and county level: Little Burstead Parish Council, Basildon Borough Council, and Essex County Council. The parish council meets at Little Burstead Village Hall on Laindon Common Road.

When elected parish and district councils were created in 1894, Little Burstead was included in the Billericay Rural District. Most of that rural district, including the parish of Little Burstead, was converted into the Billericay Urban District in 1934. The parish of Little Burstead was abolished in 1937 when all the parishes in that district were merged into a single parish called Billericay. The urban district was renamed Basildon in 1955 and was reformed to become the modern Basildon district in 1974, at which point the district also became an unparished area.

The modern parish of Little Burstead was created in 1996 from part of the unparished area.

== Religion ==
The parish church, dedicated to St Mary the Virgin, is set in a picturesque but isolated rural situation, on high ground overlooking the Thames Valley. It was built in late Norman times as a windowed oratory and was originally much smaller. The roof of the nave would have been much lower and the door was on the north side opposite the present south door, which is 15th century. The altar was almost certainly sited in the recess to the side of the present pulpit. Extensive alterations would have occurred when the chancel was added in the mid-14th century. The walls of the church are built of ragstone rubble and of puddingstone (a conglomerate of pebbles in a siliceous matrix found locally) with limestone and brick dressing. The round stones on either side of the porch are probably the base of a churchyard calvary. The south door is 15th century and the porch was added much later. The font is early 16th century and the gallery was added in 1880.

A probable explanation for the present isolated position of the church might be explained by looking further back in history than the modern site of the village and considering that the back of the church was in fact 'the front'. The road that now leads to the church probably did not exist at the time it was built; the main route from Billericay ran from Tye Common, through Wiggins Lane, across to Hatches Farm Road and up Botney Hill towards Herongate. Three manors were sited between Botney Hill and the Dunton Road; standing in this area, one can see that the church is positioned so that it overlooks the area that it probably served.

== Amenities ==
Laindon Common is in Little Burstead; it is managed by the Laindon Common Conservators, on behalf of Basildon Council.
