= Norsey Wood =

Woodland nature reserve in Essex, England

- Site of Special Scientific Interest
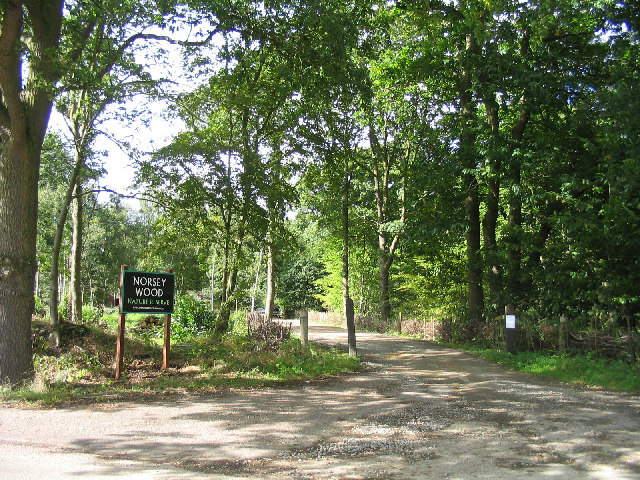
- Location of Norsey Wood.
- Area of search: Essex
- Grid reference: TQ 686955
- Coordinates: 51.632°N 0.436°E
- Interest: Biological
- Area: 67.2 ha (166 acres)
- Notification date: 1984

Norsey Wood is a 166-acre (67.2-hectare) biological Site of Special Scientific Interest (SSSI) sited to the north-east of the town of Billericay, in Essex, England. It is also a Local Nature Reserve and a Scheduled Monument. Norsey Wood is owned by the local authority, Basildon Council.

== Description ==
The site is described as an ancient coppice woodland. Norsey Wood has a wide variety of plants and animal life. The wood is helping to conserve biodiversity by providing suitable homes for some threatened and rare species like the dormouse and pipistrelle bat.

The wood is divided by rides or pathways; many of which are thought to date back to the Iron Age. The earliest written evidence for the rides is a map of 1593. They have been described as the oldest known extant woodland rides.

Bluebell, bracken and bramble are dominant on the ground layer, but there are sphagnum mosses (sphagnum palustre and Sphagnum cuspidatum) in acidic flushes, and the rare water violet in one of the four ponds. There are nine species of dragonfly. Archaeolocal features include a Bronze Age bowl barrow, Iron Age and Roman cemeteries, and a medieval deer bank.

Norsey Wood is the likely site of the Battle of Billericay during the Peasants' Revolt of 1381, a battle the peasants lost.

== Facilities ==
The visitor centre has toilets and a car park, by the Outwood Common Road entrance.

There is a Forest nursery school based on site, with access to the woods for the children.

== Access ==
There is access to the wood from several entrances on Outwood Common Road, Break Egg Hill, Norsey Close, Deerbank and Norsey Road.
