= Mill Meadows, Billericay =

Nature reserve in Billericay, Essex, England

Coordinates: 51.621°N 0.425°E

- Site of Special Scientific Interest
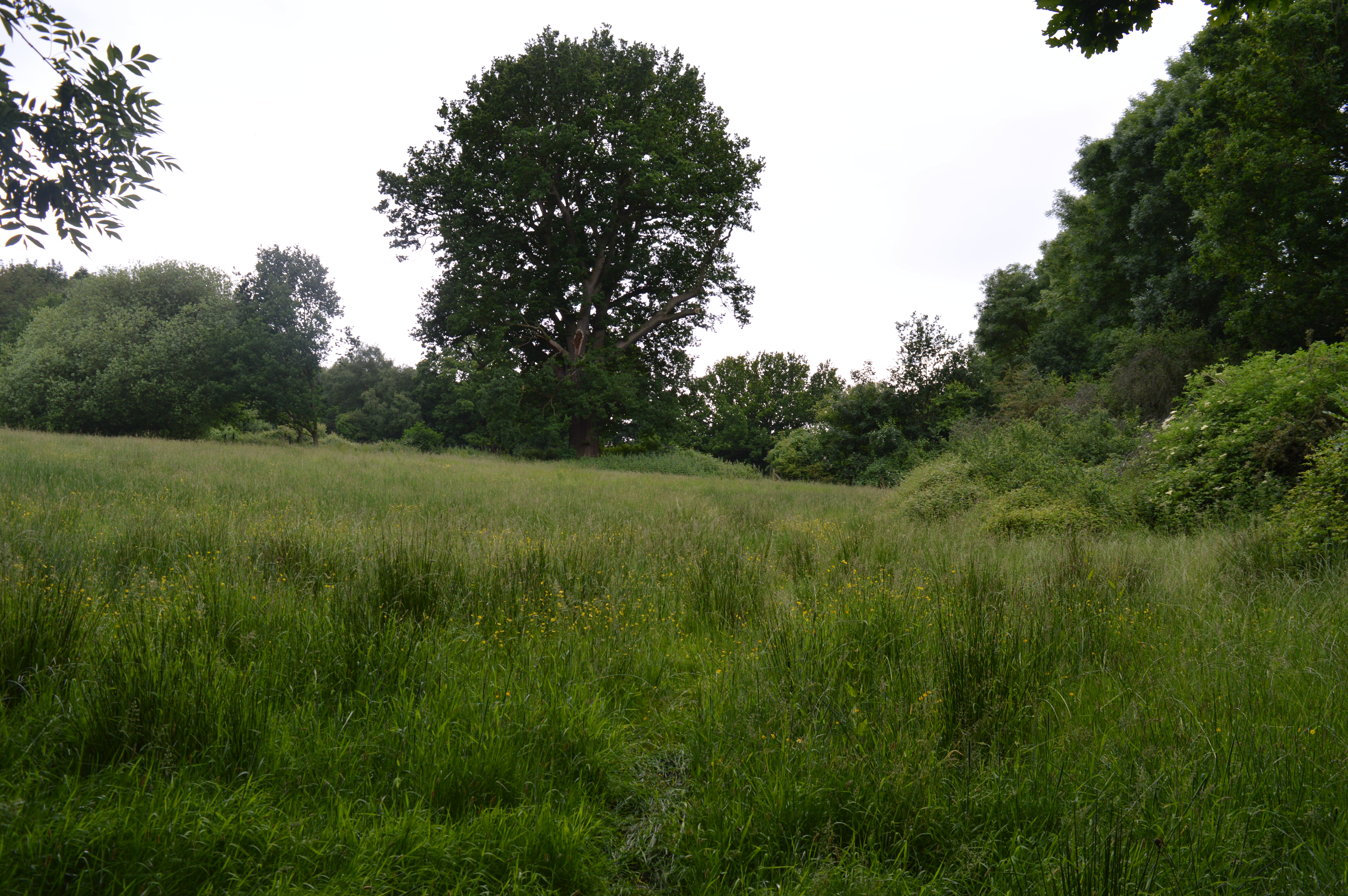
- Location of Mill Meadows, Billericay.
- Area of search: Essex
- Grid reference: TQ 681941
- Interest: Biological
- Area: 6.7 ha (17 acres)
- Notification date: 1999
- Location map: Magic Map

Mill Meadows, Billericay is a 6.7-hectare (17-acre) biological Site of Special Scientific Interest (SSSI) in Billericay in Essex, England. It is part of the 36.8 hectare Mill Meadows Local Nature Reserve (LNR), which is owned and managed by Basildon District Council.

The SSSI is composed of five sloping fields separated by old hedge lines, on London clay. Some areas are wet, and the main grasses are red fescue and common bent. Flowers include harebell and common spotted orchid. The LNR also has scrub and woodland, with mammals including badgers, stoats and foxes, and many bird species.

There is access from Greens Farm Lane.
