= Christopher Martin (Mayflower passenger) =

Mayflower passenger (1582–1621)

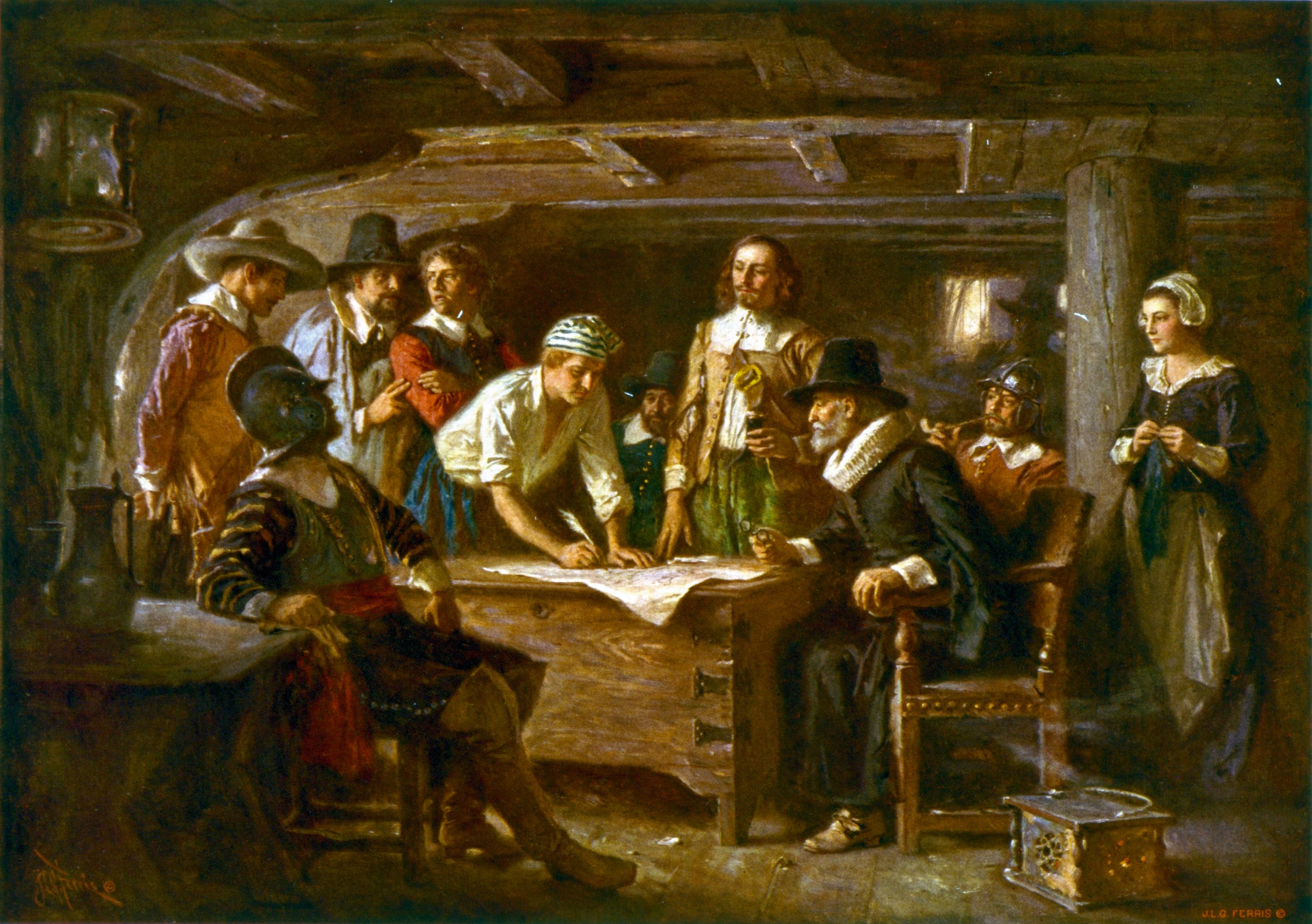
Signing the Mayflower Compact 1620, a painting by Jean Leon Gerome Ferris 1899

Christopher Martin (c. 1582 – 1621) and his family embarked on the historic 1620 voyage of the Pilgrim ship Mayflower on its journey to the New World. He was initially the governor of passengers on the ship Speedwell until that ship was found to be unseaworthy, and later on the Mayflower, until replaced by John Carver. He was a signatory to the Mayflower Compact. He and his family all perished in the first winter at Plymouth Colony.

== Early life ==
Christopher Martin first appears in the records of Great Burstead, Essex, England, with his 1607 marriage to a widow by the name of Mary Prowe.

Per Banks, according to Bradford he "came from Billirike (Billericay was then a hamlet in Gt. Burstead) in Essex, from which parties came sundrie others to go with them."

He was a merchant by trade, but without the required seven year apprenticeship, which caused him problems when he was sued, probably in 1607 in Quarter Sessions Court, by another merchant George Hilles. The result of the suit is not known, but Martin did manage to build his estate significantly over the following years.

Martin and his wife Mary had their only child together, Nathaniel, born probably in 1609 in Great Burstead. To their marriage Mary also brought a son from her prior marriage, Solomon Prowe, probably a young child. In 1609 Christopher Martin was one of those men with property holdings who were selected to appear at the archdeacons Visitation of that year.

In 1611 Martin was appointed churchwarden at Great Burstead, a position of which he may have been appointed on an involuntary basis. At Easter in 1612, Martin and his wife refused to kneel at the Easter Service and to take Holy Communion. This refusal to participate in Anglican church ceremonies indicated very early his Puritan views. This particular incident did not seem to cause issues for him within the community since a month later he was admitted as a land owner of three properties in Great Burstead by the Manorial Court.

The records of the Virginia Company in London state that on January 15, 1616/17 Christopher Martin paid for the transportation of two people with a man named Ralph Hamor. It is unknown who Martin paid to transport to the Colony of Virginia.

Records indicate that he was residing in Billericay in 1620 and it is noted that his family was having problems with the church again, this time for the behavior of his son Nathaniel and step-son Solomon. This was in regard to the boys' contrary answers to questions put to them by the vicar during their confirmation ritual. On March 3, 1620, Martin was prosecuted in the Archidiaconal Court "for suffering his son (Solomon Prowe) to the answer (the Archdeacon) that his father gave him his name." Then Martin himself was cited by church officials for not providing the financial accounts he maintained during the time he was the churchwarden. Problems with financial records would follow him later with the Mayflower voyage preparations.

About this time, presumably in early 1620, Martin was making arrangements for his family to emigrate to America on the Mayflower. Why his son Nathaniel did not travel with the family on the Mayflower is unknown – although the possibility exists that he had died, there is also speculation per Stratton that Nathaniel may well have been alive in England in 1620 and just did not accompany the family when the Mayflower departed. Nothing further is known of him.

Christopher Martin had begun selling off his land holdings, in preparation for departure from England, several years before he boarded the Mayflower. One such sale was dated June 22, 1617 and the last sale was June 8, 1620.

Due to his somewhat wealthy estate, interest in emigrating to the Colony of Virginia and being at odds with the Anglican Church, Martin associated himself with the London merchants, known as Merchant Adventurers, who were providing financial investment and arranging the emigration and settlement in America of the Leiden congregation.

== Voyage preparations ==
The Leiden congregation, knowing that passengers from all over England would be joining their party who were not members of their church, thought it would be prudent to appoint one of the "Londoners" to join in London the agents of the Leiden church, John Carver and Robert Cushman. The work to be done required the procurement of all needed goods and supplies for the Mayflower, and at the time Speedwell, voyage and for the provisions needed by the settlement afterwards. Christopher Martin, as "treasurer agent", was assigned to this task and he immediately took to the job with alacrity, with the Leiden congregation as well as the Mayflower company would coming to regret his involvement in anything that required the handling of their scarce funds.

In his later historic writings, Bradford gives some of the thinking behind the Martin's involvement in voyage preparations – the Leideners thinking it be useful that one of the "Strangers" sent by the (Merchant) Adventurers would complement well the work done by their agents John Carver and Robert Cushman in receiving monies and purchasing provisions in England for the voyage, "not so much for any great need of their help, as to avoid all suspicion, or jealousy of any particularities." Good intentions were found to not work on the personality of Christopher Martin.

Martin immediately began to abuse his authority, since with the power to purchase supplies, separately from Carver and Cushman, Martin began to purchase whatever goods he wished and without considering what was a fair price to pay for such goods. Martin, along with Carver and Cushman, was required to purchase supplies and foodstuffs such as beer, wine, hardtack, salted beef and pork, dried peas, fishing supplies, muskets, armor, clothing, tools, trade goods for Indians, and the screw-jack which would prove to be useful in ship-structure support prior to their arrival in America. Carver and Cushman collected provisions in London and Canterbury with Martin doing as he wished in Southampton, the major port on England's south coast, contrary to the others wishes. He did not ask for (or take) advice and when funds began to run short, just prior to the sailing for America, he was questioned about his financial records and became quite enraged over suspicions that the Leiden church had and refused to show his records to anyone.

== On the Speedwell ==
What is unknown, is why, despite serious concerns that the Leiden congregation had about Martin, they still assigned him to be the governor of the passengers scheduled to embark on the Speedwell, the smaller companion ship of the Mayflower. The Leideners also came to regret this, but not for very long as the Speedwell did not make the voyage. Part of the record from one of those on the Speedwell, Robert Cushman, in writing a letter to a friend in London about Christopher Martin – relating the following about him – "insulted our poor people with such scorn and contempt as if they were not good enough to wipe his shoes"; and "if I speak to him, he flies in my face, as mutinous and saith no complaints shall be heard..."; and he was afraid if any passengers were to go ashore, they would not return – "...but he will not hear them, nor suffer them to go ashore lest they should run away."; "The sailors also are so offended at his ignorant boldness, in meddling and controlling, in things he knows not what belongs to; as that some threaten to mischief him, others say they will leave the ship, and go their way; but at best this cometh of it, that he makes himself a scorn and laughing stock unto them."

The Speedwell proved to be unseaworthy for the Atlantic voyage, and many of them quit the voyage to return to London often at great financial loss, or transferred over to the Mayflower which became quite over-crowded.

== On the Mayflower ==
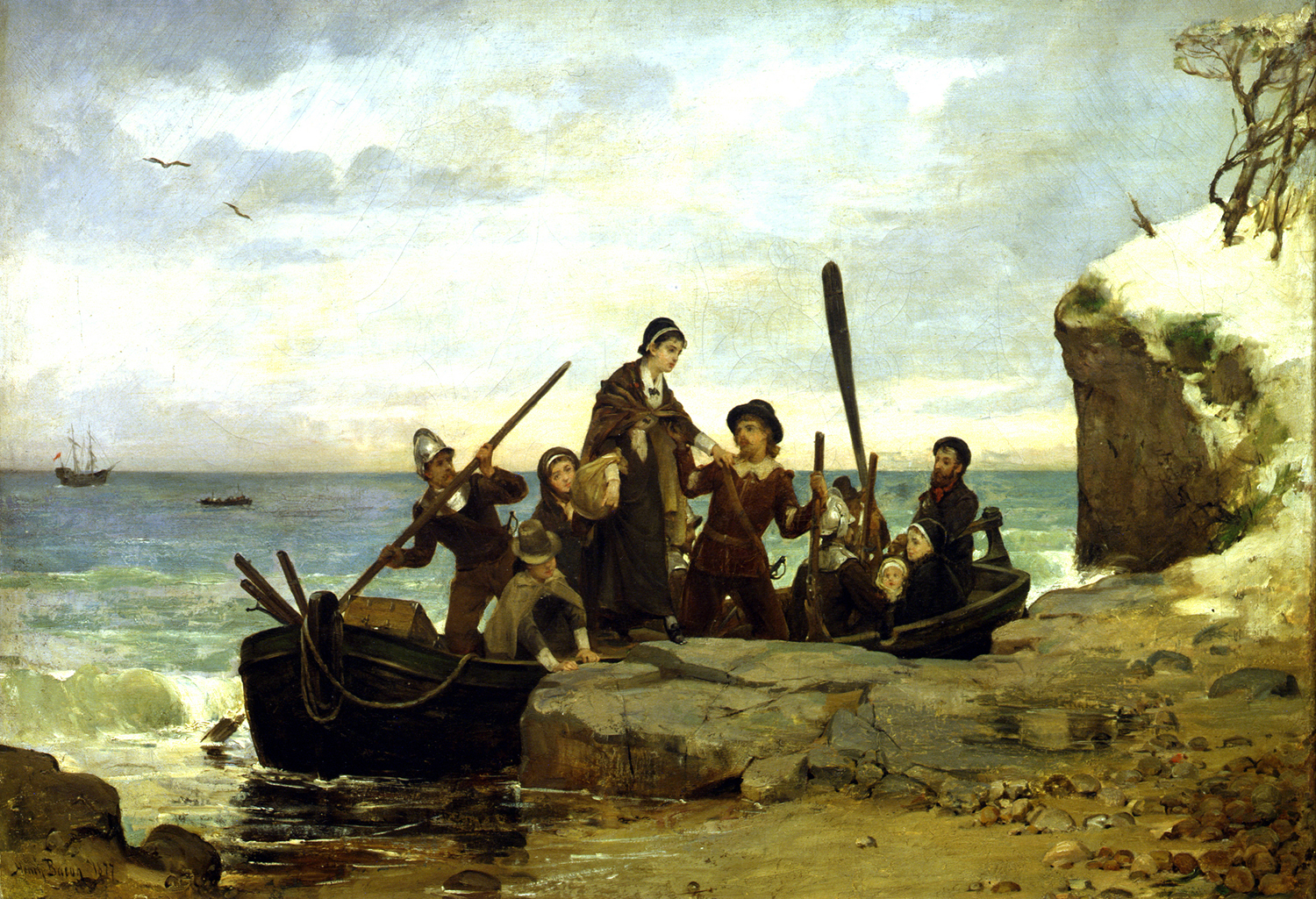
The Landing of the Pilgrims (1877) by Henry A. Bacon. The Pilgrims are traditionally said to have landed at Plymouth Rock.

Bradford indicates that initially, prior to the Mayflower sailing, Martin was the passenger governor for that ship – (Christopher Martin) "was governor in the bigger ship, and Mr. Cushman assistant." Robert Cushman did not, in the end, sail with the Mayflower.

Bradford does not state who was ship governor when the Mayflower sailed alone, but somewhere along the way on the Atlantic voyage, the Leideners had had enough of Christopher Martin and chose to be governed on the Mayflower by the more popular John Carver.

Christopher Martin had embarked in the Mayflower in company with his wife Mary, her son (and servant) Solomon Prower and Martin's servant John Langmore, all possibly residents of Essex at the time of embarkation.

The Mayflower departed Plymouth, England on September 6/16, 1620. The small, 100-foot ship had 102 passengers and a crew of about 30–40 in extremely cramped conditions. By the second month out, the ship was being buffeted by strong westerly gales, causing the ship's timbers to be badly shaken with caulking failing to keep out sea water, and with passengers, even in their berths, lying wet and ill. This, combined with a lack of proper rations and unsanitary conditions for several months, contributed to the eventual death of many travelers, especially the majority of women and children. On the way there were two deaths, a crew member and a passenger, but the worst was yet to come after arriving at their destination when, in the space of several months, almost half the passengers perished in cold, harsh, unfamiliar New England winter.

On November 9/19, 1620, after about three months at sea, including a month of delays in England, they spotted land, which was the Cape Cod Hook, now called Provincetown Harbor. And after several days of trying to get south to their planned destination of the Colony of Virginia, strong winter seas forced them to return to the harbor at Cape Cod hook, where they anchored on November 11/21. The Mayflower Compact was signed that day.

Upon arrival at Cape Cod, Christopher Martin was a signatory to the Mayflower Compact, but his step-son Solomon, being still in his teens, was not old enough to sign. His servant John Langemore, also believed to be in his teens at the time, also did not sign the Mayflower Compact.

== Family ==
The family information stated here replaces previous information due to new research in England by Mayflower researcher and biographer Caleb Johnson. The research reported the first family of Mary Prower and children of that marriage, most of whom were previously unreported. Present-day descendants of several of those children may be qualified as newly found Mayflower descendants.

Christopher Martin married widow Mary Prowe [Prower] in Great Burstead parish, Essex, on February 26, 1606/07.

Mary (______) Prower may have been born in the mid-1570s due to her first child having been born about 1594. Her ancestry is unknown. After extensive research, Author Caleb Johnson believes the name of her first husband was Edward Prower who first appears in Billericay, Essex, about 1586, possibly from Hallingbury. He married Mary (_____) about 1592.

Edward and Mary Prower had the following children, all born or baptized in Great Burstead:

1. Edward Prower (Jr), born about 1594. Possibly named for his father. No baptism record for him or his brother Solomon in Great Burstead parish as no records exist from 1579 through 1596.
2. Solomon Prower, born possibly between 1595 and 1598. He was a Mayflower passenger with Bradford referring to him as a servant. He died in Plymouth on December 24, 1620.
3. John Prower, baptized December 2, 1599, buried December 11, 1599.
4. Mary Prower, baptized June 21, 1601. Possibly named after her mother.
5. Unnamed child, buried October 26, 1603.

Although no burial record or probate exists for Edward Prower, Johnson believes that he died between 1603 (had infant buried in October 1603) and February 1606/07, when his widow Mary married Christopher Martin.

Author Caleb Johnson additionally states that since Mary (Prowe) Martin came as a passenger on the Mayflower, her five children are rightfully Mayflower descendants. It is known that her son Solomon came on the Mayflower as a "singleman" and died in December 1620. Two other children – John and an unnamed child, died in infancy.

Johnson further states that if there are any descendants of Mary (Prowe) Martin alive today, they must be descendants of eldest son Edward Prower (Jr.) or daughter Mary Prower. Johnson has found no record to prove that daughter Mary survived, but he states that there is proof that Edward Prower did survive, married and had several children. There is a record that on August 19, 1621, that Edward Prower and his wife Dorothy registered the baptism of their first child at Great Burstead, naming him Solomon Prower. Johnson believes that Edward had heard about the death of his brother Solomon in Plymouth seven months earlier and had named his first-born for him. This infant died in January 1622, so in memory Edward Prower named his next child, baptised in November 1622, also Solomon. In August 1628 they baptised a daughter Martha.

== Death of Christopher Martin and family ==
Martin's step-son Solomon Prowe died on December 24, 1620, just as the exploration of Plymouth Harbor had commenced.

By early January 1621, Christopher Martin had become quite ill and on January 6 (or 7) Governor John Carver returned to the Mayflower from a trip ashore to discuss accounts and business with Martin. Christopher Martin is believed to have died the following day, January 8, 1621. Mary Martin died a few days later on January 11. Both were categorized as dying in the "general sickness." Their servant John Langmore also died that winter.

Bradford wrote that "Mr. Martin, he and all his, dyed in the first infection; not long after the arivall." The death of Christopher Martin removed what might have been a source of future trouble in the life of Plymouth colony.

Christopher Martin was buried in the Coles Hill Burial Ground, Plymouth. The burial place of his wife Mary was also Coles Hill Burial Ground. The family is memorialized on the Pilgrim Memorial Tomb, Coles Hill, Plymouth. The three entries for them on the Tomb are "Christopher Martin and his wife", "Solomon Prower" and their servant John Langemore/Langerman named as "John Langmore". Solomon Prower and John Langerman most likely were also buried on Coles Hill, as were all on the Mayflower who died the first winter after the ship moved from its Cape Cod anchorage.

In 1920, at the 300th anniversary of the Mayflower sailing, a plaque was unveiled in the United Reformed Church in Billericay, Essex, England, to commemorate the Martin family, Mayflower emigrants from that town. The plaque names Christopher Martin, Marie Martin, Solomon Prower and John Langerman.

== Servants traveling with the Christopher Martin family on the Mayflower ==
- Solomon Prowe. Servant and step-son of Christopher Martin. He did not sign the Mayflower Compact indicating he had not yet reached the age of twenty-one, possibly being born between 1600 and 1606. He seems to have been from Essex, from where the Martin family probably originated. All members of the Martin family died during the first few months the Mayflower was in the New World. Solomon Prower died on December 24, 1620, just days before the exploration of Plymouth Harbor for the Pilgrim settlement.
- John Langemore. Servant to Christopher Martin. Probably in his teens as he did not sign the Mayflower Compact. Almost nothing is known of his ancestry although he may have come with the Martin family from Essex. He died the first winter, as did all members of the Martin family.
