= 1984 Basildon District Council election =

1984 UK local government election

← 1983	3 May 1984	1986 →

14 of the 42 seats to Basildon District Council 22 seats needed for a majority
	First party	Second party	Third party
Party	Labour	Conservative	Alliance
Seats before	24	13	3
Seats won	9	4	1
Seats after	24	15	3
Seat change	Steady	▲2	Steady
Popular vote	19,288	15,612	9,450
Percentage	42.6%	34.5%	20.9%
- Map showing the results of contested wards in the 1984 Basildon Borough Council elections.
Council control before election
Labour Party
Council control after election
Labour Party

The 1984 Basildon District Council election took place on 3 May 1984 to elect members of Basildon District Council in Essex, England. This was on the same day as other local elections. One third of the council was up for election; the seats which were last contested in 1980. The Labour Party retained control of the council, which it had held since 1982.

== Overall results ==
1984 Basildon District Council Election
Party	Seats	Gains	Losses	Net gain/loss	Seats %	Votes %	Votes	+/−
Labour	9	0	0	Steady	64.3	42.6	19,288	▼3.2
Conservative	4	3	1	▲2	28.6	34.5	15,612	▲1.3
Alliance	1	1	0	▲1	7.1	20.9	9,450	▲12.5
Independent Liberal	0	0	0	Steady	0.0	1.3	601	New
Ind. Conservative	0	0	0	Steady	0.0	0.7	297	New
Total	14						45,248	

All comparisons in vote share are to the corresponding 1980 election.

== Ward results ==
=== Billericay East ===
Location of Billericay East ward

Billericay East
Party	Candidate	Votes	%
Conservative	P. Patrick	2,047	61.8%
Labour	I. Harlow	646	19.5%
Alliance	A. Edwards	618	18.7%
Turnout			38.4%
Conservative gain from Residents			

=== Billericay West ===
Location of Billericay West ward

Billericay West
Party	Candidate	Votes	%
Conservative	A. White	2,163	64.9%
Alliance	G. Taylor	778	23.3%
Labour	A. Charley	394	11.8%
Turnout			41.1%
Conservative gain from Residents			

=== Burstead ===
Location of Burstead ward

Burstead
Party	Candidate	Votes	%
Conservative	I. Leask	1,939	53.3%
Alliance	G. Cronkshaw	1,044	28.7%
Labour	M. Baker	656	18.0%
Turnout			43.7%
Conservative gain from Residents			

=== Fryerns Central ===
Location of Fryerns Central ward

Fryerns Central
Party	Candidate	Votes	%
Labour	C. O'Brien	2,094	63.7%
Independent Liberal	J. White	601	18.3%
Conservative	R. Sheridan	591	18.0%
Turnout			%
Labour hold			

=== Fryerns East ===
Location of Fryerns East ward

Fryerns East
Party	Candidate	Votes	%
Labour	D. Harrison	1,860	71.9%
Conservative	G. Penvere	526	20.3%
Alliance	J. Smith	201	7.8%
Turnout			31.2%
Labour hold			

=== Laindon ===
Location of Laindon ward

Laindon
Party	Candidate	Votes	%
Labour	P. Rackley	1,602	48.7%
Conservative	G. Buckenham	1,406	42.7%
Alliance	B. Simmons	284	8.6%
Turnout			41.5%
Labour hold			

=== Langdon Hills ===
Location of Langdon Hills ward

Langdon Hills
Party	Candidate	Votes	%
Labour	J. Bielby	1,196	43.0%
Alliance	P. Richardson	881	31.7%
Conservative	R. Dutton	706	25.4%
Turnout			37.6%
Labour hold			

=== Lee Chapel North ===
Location of Lee Chapel North ward

Lee Chapel North
Party	Candidate	Votes	%
Labour	R. Fitzgibbon	1,996	61.1%
Alliance	K. Neil	742	22.7%
Conservative	J. Jenkinson	528	16.2%
Turnout			40.8%
Labour hold			

=== Nethermayne ===
Location of Nethermayne ward

Nethermayne
Party	Candidate	Votes	%
Labour	J. Buckley	1,690	42.8%
Alliance	G. Williams	1,310	33.2%
Conservative	T. Hall	950	24.1%
Turnout			49.8%
Labour hold			

=== Pitsea East ===
Location of Pitsea East ward

Pitsea East
Party	Candidate	Votes	%
Labour	W. Hodge	2,106	64.7%
Conservative	E. Dines	961	29.5%
Alliance	R. Hawksworth	190	5.8%
Turnout			37.5%
Labour hold			

=== Pitsea West ===
Location of Pitsea West ward

Pitsea West
Party	Candidate	Votes	%
Labour	D. Marks	2,136	74.1%
Conservative	P. Tomkins	554	19.2%
Alliance	S. Saunders	194	6.7%
Turnout			32.6%
Labour hold			

=== Vange ===
Location of Vange ward

Vange
Party	Candidate	Votes	%
Labour	H. Witzer	1,527	66.7%
Conservative	J. Coombs	529	23.1%
Alliance	A. Scott	232	10.1%
Turnout			29.6%
Labour hold			

=== Wickford North ===
Location of Wickford North ward

Wickford North
Party	Candidate	Votes	%
Conservative	R. Britnell	1,570	46.8%
Labour	C. Wilson	987	29.4%
Alliance	M. Birch	801	23.9%
Turnout			40.3%
Conservative hold			

=== Wickford South ===
Location of Wickford South ward

Wickford South
Party	Candidate	Votes	%
Alliance	G. Palmer	2,175	54.2%
Conservative	G. Jones	1,142	28.5%
Labour	D. Saxby	398	9.9%
Ind. Conservative	D. Edwards	297	7.4%
Turnout			49.1%
Alliance gain from Conservative			
