= 2004 Basildon District Council election =

2004 UK local government election

← 2003	10 June 2004	2006 →

14 of the 42 seats to Basildon District Council 22 seats needed for a majority
	First party	Second party	Third party
Party	Conservative	Labour	Liberal Democrats
Seats before	23	14	3
Seats won	9	4	2
Seats after	25	14	3
Seat change	▲2	Steady	Steady
Popular vote	16,536	8,483	6,960
Percentage	45.2%	23.2%	19.0%
- Map of the results of the 2004 Basildon council election. Conservatives in blue, Labour in red and Liberal Democrats in yellow. Wards in grey were not contested in 2004.
Council control before election
Conservative Party
Council control after election
Conservative Party

The 2004 Basildon District Council election took place on 10 June 2004 to elect members of Basildon District Council in Essex, England. One third of the council was up for election and the Conservative party stayed in overall control of the council.

After the election, the composition of the council was

- Conservative 25
- Labour 14
- Liberal Democrats 3

== Election result ==
2004 Basildon local election result
Party	Seats	Gains	Losses	Net gain/loss	Seats %	Votes %	Votes	+/−
Conservative	9	2	0	▲2	64.3	45.2	16,536	
Labour	4	2	2	Steady	28.6	23.2	8,483	
Liberal Democrats	1	0	0	Steady	7.1	19.0	6,960	
BNP	0	0	0	Steady	0	8.2	2,983	
Green	0	0	0	Steady	0	1.5	566	
Senior Citizens	0	0	0	Steady	0	1.2	430	
English Democrat	0	0	0	Steady	0	1.1	420	
Independent	0	0	2	▼2	Steady	0.4	147	
Respect	0	0	0	Steady	0	0.2	57	

All comparisons in vote share are to the corresponding 2000 election.

== Ward results ==
=== Billericay East ===
Location of Billericay East ward

Billericay East
Party	Candidate	Votes	%	±%
Conservative	Stuart Sullivan	2,150	65.9	−0.3
Liberal Democrats	John James	780	23.9	+1.6
Labour	Patricia Reid	333	10.2	−1.3
Majority		1,370	42.0	−1.9
Turnout		3,263	36.6	
Conservative hold		Swing		

=== Billericay West ===
Location of Billericay West ward

Billericay West
Party	Candidate	Votes	%	±%
Conservative	Philip Turner	2,345	67.9	−1.6
Liberal Democrats	Frank Bellard	821	23.8	+2.9
Labour	William Archibald	287	8.3	−1.4
Majority		1,524	44.1	−4.5
Turnout		3,453	37.3	
Conservative hold		Swing		

=== Burstead ===
Location of Burstead ward

Burstead
Party	Candidate	Votes	%	±%
Conservative	Richard Moore	1,935	61.7	+10.1
Liberal Democrats	Geoffrey Taylor	837	26.7	−11.7
Labour	Margaret Viney	365	11.6	+1.6
Majority		1,098	35.0	+21.8
Turnout		3,137	37.2	
Conservative hold		Swing		

=== Crouch ===
Location of Crouch ward

Crouch
Party	Candidate	Votes	%	±%
Conservative	Stuart Allen	1,121	54.1	
English Democrat	Kim Gandy	420	20.3	
Labour	Wendy Aitken	272	13.1	
Liberal Democrats	Vivien Howard	261	12.6	
Majority		701	33.8	
Turnout		2,074	34.1	
Conservative hold		Swing		

=== Fryerns ===
Location of Fryerns ward

Fryerns
Party	Candidate	Votes	%	±%
Labour	Paul Kirkman	1,117	40.2	−3.2
BNP	David King	601	21.6	−0.3
Conservative	Kenneth Evens	584	21.0	+1.8
Liberal Democrats	John Lutton	296	10.6	+0.6
Green	Adam Ellis	183	6.6	+1.0
Majority		516	18.6	−2.9
Turnout		2,781	30.0	
Labour hold		Swing		

=== Laindon Park ===
Location of Laindon Park ward

Laindon Park
Party	Candidate	Votes	%	±%
Conservative	Frank Tomlin	881	34.9	−8.7
Labour	Anthony Borlase	716	28.3	−12.0
BNP	Steven Watts	509	20.2	+20.2
Liberal Democrats	Jonathan Myall	273	10.8	+2.4
Independent	Alfred Viccary	147	5.8	+0.8
Majority		165	6.5	+3.2
Turnout		2,526	30.0	
Conservative gain from Labour		Swing		

=== Langdon Hills ===
Location of Langdon Hills ward

Langdon Hills
Party	Candidate	Votes	%	±%
Conservative	Stephen Hillier	1,195	54.5	
Labour	Paul Mitchell	448	20.4	
Liberal Democrats	Linda Williams	310	14.1	
Green	Annie Humphries	238	10.9	
Majority		747	34.1	
Turnout		2,191	33.8	
Conservative hold		Swing		

=== Lee Chapel North ===
Lee Chapel North ward in Basildon 2002

Lee Chapel North
Party	Candidate	Votes	%	±%
Labour	Lynda Gordon	996	38.6	−2.0
Conservative	Terry Fleet	604	23.4	+0.4
BNP	Sidney Chaney	519	20.1	+5.0
Liberal Democrats	Michael Martin	261	10.1	−0.9
Green	Ernest Humphries	145	5.6	−0.4
Respect	Richard Duane	57	2.2	+2.2
Majority		392	15.2	−2.4
Turnout		2,582	29.8	
Labour gain from Independent		Swing		

=== Nethermayne ===
Location of Nethermayne ward

Nethermayne
Party	Candidate	Votes	%	±%
Liberal Democrats	Geoffrey Williams	1,459	45.5	−2.6
Conservative	Harry Tucker	982	30.6	+6.4
Labour	Andrew Manning	766	23.9	−3.8
Majority		477	14.9	−5.5
Turnout		3,207	37.2	
Liberal Democrats hold		Swing		

=== Pitsea North West ===
Location of Pitsea North West ward

Pitsea North West
Party	Candidate	Votes	%	±%
Conservative	Andrew Baggott	838	40.2	+4.8
Labour	Allan Davies	789	37.8	−10.5
Liberal Democrats	Martin Howard	458	22.0	+5.8
Majority		49	2.4	
Turnout		2,085	23.3	
Conservative gain from Labour		Swing		

=== Pitsea South East ===
Location of Pitsea South East ward

Pitsea South East
Party	Candidate	Votes	%	±%
Conservative	Jacqueline Blake	1,199	44.0	+7.9
Labour	Michael Plant	722	26.5	−7.1
BNP	Leonard Heather	526	19.3	+3.8
Liberal Democrats	Christopher Melanaphy	275	10.1	+2.2
Majority		477	17.5	+15.0
Turnout		2,722	30.8	
Conservative hold		Swing		

=== St Martin's ===
Location of St Martin's ward

St Martin's
Party	Candidate	Votes	%	±%
Labour	Richard Llewellyn	592	36.6	−10.4
BNP	Philip Howell	434	26.8	+26.8
Conservative	Deborah Allen	378	23.4	−5.9
Liberal Democrats	Stephen Nice	213	13.2	−1.6
Majority		158	9.8	−7.9
Turnout		1,617	27.9	
Labour hold		Swing		

=== Vange ===
Location of Vange ward

Vange
Party	Candidate	Votes	%	±%
Labour	Hilary Dyer	612	35.3	−6.6
Conservative	Philip Johnson	502	29.0	−8.4
BNP	L Stone	394	22.7	+22.7
Liberal Democrats	Philip Jenkins	224	12.9	−0.6
Majority		110	6.4	+1.9
Turnout		1,732	26.5	
Labour gain from Independent		Swing		

=== Wickford North ===
Location of Wickford North ward

Wickford North
Party	Candidate	Votes	%	±%
Conservative	Carole Morris	1,822	56.7	−6.7
Liberal Democrats	Fane Cummings	492	15.3	−0.8
Labour	Christopher Wilson	468	14.6	−5.9
Senior Citizens	David Harrison	430	13.4	+13.4
Majority		1,330	41.4	−1.5
Turnout		3,212	34.9	
Conservative hold		Swing		
