= 1999 Basildon District Council election =

1999 UK local government election

← 1998	6 May 1999	2000 →

14 of the 42 seats to Basildon District Council 22 seats needed for a majority
	First party	Second party	Third party
Party	Labour	Conservative	Liberal Democrats
Seats before	23	6	13
Seats won	8	5	1
Seats after	23	11	8
Seat change	Steady	▲5	▼5
Popular vote	12,173	11,401	5,408
Percentage	40.0%	37.4%	17.8%
- Map showing the results of contested wards in the 1999 Basildon Borough Council elections.
Council control before election
Labour
Council control after election
Labour

The 1999 Basildon District Council election took place on 6 May 1999 to elect members of Basildon District Council in Essex, England. One third of the council was up for election and the Labour Party stayed in overall control of the council.

After the election, the composition of the council was:

- Labour 23
- Conservative 11
- Liberal Democrats 8

== Election results ==
The results saw Labour keep their majority after retaining all the seats they had been defending in Basildon. The Conservatives became the main opposition on the council after gaining seats from the Liberal Democrats in Billericay and Wickford. Overall turnout in the election was 24.3%.

1999 Basildon local election result
Party	Seats	Gains	Losses	Net gain/loss	Seats %	Votes %	Votes	+/−
Labour	8	0	0	Steady	57.1	40.0	12,173	▼8.3
Conservative	5	5	0	▲5	35.7	37.4	11,401	▲13.9
Liberal Democrats	1	0	5	▼5	7.1	17.8	5,408	▼5.7
Residents	0	0	0	Steady	0.0	4.2	1,287	New
Independent	0	0	0	Steady	0.0	0.6	184	New

All comparisons in vote share are to the corresponding 1995 election.

== Ward results ==
=== Billericay East ===
Location of Billericay East ward

Billericay East
Party	Candidate	Votes	%
Conservative	Tony Archer	1,102	52.3%
Liberal Democrats	F. Bellard	701	33.3%
Labour	P. Reid	304	14.4%
Turnout			23.9%
Conservative gain from Liberal Democrats			

=== Billericay West ===
Location of Billericay West ward

Billericay West
Party	Candidate	Votes	%
Conservative	Stephen Horgan	1,364	47.0%
Residents	Taylor G.	1,287	44.3%
Labour	L. Howard	253	8.7%
Turnout			27.5%
Conservative gain from Liberal Democrats			

=== Burstead ===
Location of Burstead ward

Burstead
Party	Candidate	Votes	%
Conservative	Desmond Lake	1,196	55.2%
Liberal Democrats	C. Hands	608	28.0%
Labour	M. Viney	364	16.8%
Turnout			24.8%
Conservative gain from Liberal Democrats			

=== Fryerns Central ===
Location of Fryerns Central ward

Fryerns Central
Party	Candidate	Votes	%
Labour	Annie Humphries	1,293	68.8%
Conservative	W. Marck	350	18.6%
Liberal Democrats	S. Dickinson	193	10.3%
Independent	A. Viccary	42	2.2%
Turnout			23.6%
Labour hold			

=== Fryerns East ===
Location of Fryerns East ward

Fryerns East
Party	Candidate	Votes	%
Labour	L. Rossati	1,107	70.3%
Conservative	D. Allen	331	21.0%
Liberal Democrats	J. Lutton	137	8.7%
Turnout			20.9%
Labour hold			

=== Laindon ===
Location of Laindon ward

Laindon
Party	Candidate	Votes	%
Labour	Tony Bennett	1,081	49.1%
Conservative	D. Walsh	769	34.9%
Liberal Democrats	V. Howard	209	9.5%
Independent	S. Chaney	142	6.5%
Turnout			22.4%
Labour hold			

=== Langdon Hills ===
Location of Langdon Hills ward

Langdon Hills
Party	Candidate	Votes	%
Labour	Bob Sears	1,329	49.5%
Conservative	S. Hillier	1,177	43.9%
Liberal Democrats	M. Dickinson	177	6.6%
Turnout			27.8%
Labour hold			

=== Lee Chapel ===
Location of Lee Chapel North ward

Lee Chapel
Party	Candidate	Votes	%
Labour	Lynda Gordon	1,202	64.4%
Conservative	S. Popplewell	456	24.4%
Liberal Democrats	M. Dale	208	11.1%
Turnout			25.0%
Labour hold			

=== Nethermayne ===
Location of Nethermayne ward

Nethermayne
Party	Candidate	Votes	%
Liberal Democrats	Joe White	1,128	47.9%
Labour	A. Manning	794	33.7%
Conservative	S. Allen	434	18.4%
Turnout			34.4%
Liberal Democrats hold			

=== Pitsea East ===
Location of Pitsea East ward

Pitsea East
Party	Candidate	Votes	%
Labour	Keith Bobbin	1,235	50.9%
Conservative	K. Blake	990	40.8%
Liberal Democrats	J. Baker	201	8.3%
Turnout			23.2%
Labour hold			

=== Pitsea West ===
Location of Pitsea West ward

Pitsea West
Party	Candidate	Votes	%
Labour	David Abrahall	1,122	69.0%
Conservative	A. Hedley	347	21.4%
Liberal Democrats	L. Bellard	156	9.6%
Turnout			19.9%
Labour hold			

=== Vange ===
Location of Vange ward

Vange
Party	Candidate	Votes	%
Labour	D. Golding	893	65.3%
Conservative	R. Cornish	370	27.1%
Liberal Democrats	L. Williams	104	7.6%
Turnout			17.4%
Labour hold			

=== Wickford North ===
Location of Wickford North ward

Wickford North
Party	Candidate	Votes	%
Conservative	Michael Mowe	1,094	43.7%
Liberal Democrats	A. Banton	878	35.1%
Labour	C. Wilson	532	21.2%
Turnout			27.1%
Conservative gain from Liberal Democrats			

=== Wickford South ===
Location of Wickford South ward

Wickford South
Party	Candidate	Votes	%
Conservative	Don Morris	1,421	50.9%
Liberal Democrats	S. Howe	708	25.3%
Labour	A. Ede	664	23.8%
Turnout			23.6%
Conservative gain from Liberal Democrats			
