= 1996 Basildon District Council election =

1996 UK local government election

← 1995	2 May 1996	1998 →

15 of the 42 seats to Basildon District Council 22 seats needed for a majority
	First party	Second party	Third party
Party	Labour	Liberal Democrats	Conservative
Seats before	16	12	14
Seats won	9	4	2
Seats after	24	16	2
Seat change	▲8	▲4	▼12
Popular vote	19,809	9,865	13,078
Percentage	45.9%	22.9%	30.3%
- Map showing the results of contested wards in the 1996 Basildon Borough Council elections.
Council control before election
No overall control
Council control after election
Labour

The 1996 Basildon District Council election took place on 2 May 1996 to elect members of Basildon District Council in Essex, England. This was on the same day as other local elections. One third of the council was up for election; the seats which were last contested in 1992. The Labour Party gained control of the council, which had previously been under no overall control, for the first time since 1991.

== Overall results ==
1996 Basildon District Council Election
Party	Seats	Gains	Losses	Net gain/loss	Seats %	Votes %	Votes	+/−
Labour	9	8	0	▲8	60.0	45.9	19,809	▲20.1
Liberal Democrats	4	3	0	▲3	26.7	22.9	9,865	▲10.4
Conservative	2	0	11	▼11	13.3	30.3	13,078	▼31.4
Independent	0	0	0	Steady	0.0	1.0	413	New
Total	15						43,165	

All comparisons in vote share are to the corresponding 1992 election.

== Ward results ==
=== Billericay East ===
Location of Billericay East ward

Billericay East
Party	Candidate	Votes	%
Liberal Democrats	M. Hersom	1,406	42.3%
Conservative	W. Lea	1,298	39.1%
Labour	R. Rackham	616	18.6%
Turnout			37.3%
Liberal Democrats gain from Conservative			

=== Billericay West ===
Location of Billericay West ward

Billericay West
Party	Candidate	Votes	%
Liberal Democrats	R. Hatch	2,014	51.5%
Conservative	F. Tomlin	1,426	36.4%
Labour	P. Clark	474	12.1%
Turnout			38.0%
Liberal Democrats gain from Conservative			

=== Burstead ===
Location of Burstead ward

Burstead
Party	Candidate	Votes	%
Conservative	G. Buckenham	1,197	60.3%
Liberal Democrats	J. Fowler	539	27.1%
Labour	K. Robertson	250	12.6%
Turnout			22.7%
Conservative hold			

=== Fryerns Central ===
Location of Fryerns Central ward

Fryerns Central
Party	Candidate	Votes	%
Labour	K. Adlam	2,378	74.8%
Conservative	S. Allen	550	17.3%
Liberal Democrats	K. Tyson	250	7.9%
Turnout			39.4%
Labour gain from Conservative			

=== Fryerns East ===
Location of Fryerns East ward

Fryerns East
Party	Candidate	Votes	%
Labour	J. Payn	1,997	73.5%
Conservative	D. Allan	497	18.3%
Liberal Democrats	J. Lutton	224	8.2%
Turnout			35.3%
Labour gain from Conservative			

=== Laindon ===
Location of Laindon ward

Laindon
Party	Candidate	Votes	%
Labour	A. Borlase	1,723	52.0%
Conservative	D. Schofield	1,080	32.6%
Liberal Democrats	M. Bellard	307	9.3%
Independent	S. Chaney	201	6.1%
Turnout			36.7%
Labour gain from Conservative			

=== Langdon Hills ===
Location of Langdon Hills ward

Langdon Hills
Party	Candidate	Votes	%
Labour	S. Caira-Neeson	1,600	
Labour	I. White	1,448	
Conservative	S. Lake	1,148	
Conservative	S. Horgan	1,146	
Liberal Democrats	S. Evans	337	
Liberal Democrats	W. Kent	283	
Turnout			35.6%
Labour gain from Conservative			
Labour hold			

=== Lee Chapel North ===
Location of Lee Chapel North ward

Lee Chapel North
Party	Candidate	Votes	%
Labour	D. Keefe	1,945	68.7%
Conservative	M. Amson	581	20.5%
Liberal Democrats	D. Neale	183	6.5%
Independent	M. Dale	121	4.3%
Turnout			37.8%
Labour gain from Conservative			

=== Nethermayne ===
Location of Nethermayne ward

Nethermayne
Party	Candidate	Votes	%
Liberal Democrats	B. Williams	1,447	40.9%
Labour	S. Nandanwar	1,379	38.9%
Conservative	S. Blackburn	715	20.2%
Turnout			51.3%
Liberal Democrats gain from Conservative			

=== Pitsea East ===
Location of Pitsea East ward

Pitsea East
Party	Candidate	Votes	%
Labour	K. Woods	1,851	55.0%
Conservative	K. Blake	1,145	34.0%
Liberal Democrats	D. Birch	276	8.2%
Independent	D. Murray	91	2.7%
Turnout			31.5%
Labour gain from Conservative			

=== Pitsea West ===
Location of Pitsea West ward

Pitsea West
Party	Candidate	Votes	%
Labour	R. Llewellyn	1,902	74.5%
Conservative	C. Coombes	447	17.5%
Liberal Democrats	A. Ferris	203	8.0%
Turnout			30.4%
Labour gain from Conservative			

=== Vange ===
Location of Vange ward

Vange
Party	Candidate	Votes	%
Labour	J. Palmer	1,655	73.6%
Conservative	S. Hillier	411	18.3%
Liberal Democrats	M. Dickinson	182	8.1%
Turnout			29.9%
Labour gain from Conservative			

=== Wickford North ===
Location of Wickford North ward

Wickford North
Party	Candidate	Votes	%
Liberal Democrats	A. Hooker	1,449	40.9%
Conservative	B. Pummell	1,147	32.3%
Labour	C. Wilson	951	26.8%
Turnout			36.6%
Liberal Democrats gain from Conservative			

=== Wickford South ===
Location of Wickford South ward

Wickford South
Party	Candidate	Votes	%
Conservative	M. Buckley	1,436	40.2%
Liberal Democrats	M. Woods	1,337	37.4%
Labour	L. Roe	799	22.4%
Turnout			34.2%
Conservative hold			
