= 1988 Basildon District Council election =

1988 UK local government election

← 1987	5 May 1988	1990 →

14 of the 42 seats to Basildon District Council 22 seats needed for a majority
	First party	Second party	Third party
Party	Labour	Conservative	SLD
Seats before	20	11	11
Seats won	8	6	0
Seats after	20	13	9
Seat change	Steady	▲2	▼2
Popular vote	18,116	19,283	10,531
Percentage	37.8%	40.2%	22.0%
- Map showing the results of contested wards in the 1988 Basildon Borough Council elections.
Council control before election
No overall control
Council control after election
No overall control

The 1988 Basildon District Council election took place on 5 May 1988 to elect members of Basildon District Council in Essex, England. This was on the same day as other local elections. One third of the council was up for election; the seats which were last contested in 1984. The council remained under no overall control.

== Overall results ==
1988 Basildon District Council Election
Party	Seats	Gains	Losses	Net gain/loss	Seats %	Votes %	Votes	+/−
Labour	8	0	1	▼1	57.1	37.8	18,116	▼4.8
Conservative	6	2	0	▲2	42.9	40.2	19,283	▲5.7
SLD	0	0	1	▼1	0.0	22.0	10,531	▲1.1
Total	14						47,930	

All comparisons in vote share are to the corresponding 1984 election.

== Ward results ==
=== Billericay East ===
Location of Billericay East ward

Billericay East
Party	Candidate	Votes	%
Conservative	P. Patrick	2,106	64.0%
Labour	J. Morley	678	20.6%
SLD	G. Viney	508	15.4%
Turnout			37.9%
Conservative hold			

=== Billericay West ===
Location of Billericay West ward

Billericay West
Party	Candidate	Votes	%
Conservative	C. Lees	2,638	70.6%
SLD	G. Taylor	761	20.4%
Labour	J. Orpe	338	9.0%
Turnout			40.8%
Conservative hold			

=== Burstead ===
Location of Burstead ward

Burstead
Party	Candidate	Votes	%
Conservative	R. White	1,967	47.8%
SLD	G. Bellard	1,773	43.1%
Labour	M. Davis	374	9.1%
Turnout			48.8%
Conservative hold			

=== Fryerns Central ===
Location of Fryerns Central ward

Fryerns Central
Party	Candidate	Votes	%
Labour	D. Webb	2,459	69.8%
Conservative	S. Allen	793	22.5%
SLD	P. Jenkins	272	7.7%
Turnout			40.5%
Labour hold			

=== Fryerns East ===
Location of Fryerns East ward

Fryerns East
Party	Candidate	Votes	%
Labour	E. Gelder	1,687	49.2%
SLD	J. Lutton	1,030	30.0%
Conservative	R. Sheridan	712	20.8%
Turnout			41.2%
Labour hold			

=== Laindon ===
Location of Laindon ward

Laindon
Party	Candidate	Votes	%
Labour	P. Rackley	1,776	47.4%
Conservative	G. Buckenham	1,649	44.0%
SLD	M. Hammond	319	8.5%
Turnout			42.2%
Labour hold			

=== Langdon Hills ===
Location of Langdon Hills ward

Langdon Hills
Party	Candidate	Votes	%
Conservative	J. Kennard	1,082	39.5%
Labour	J. Gardner	833	30.4%
SLD	S. Dean-Wiley	823	30.1%
Turnout			32.8%
Conservative gain from Labour			

=== Lee Chapel North ===
Location of Lee Chapel North ward

Lee Chapel North
Party	Candidate	Votes	%
Labour	R. Fitzgibbon	1,903	61.8%
Conservative	J. Woods	827	26.9%
SLD	S. Saunders	349	11.3%
Turnout			39.1%
Labour hold			

=== Nethermayne ===
Location of Nethermayne ward

Nethermayne
Party	Candidate	Votes	%
Labour	C. Wilson	1,390	36.5%
SLD	S. Blackbourn	1,260	33.1%
Conservative	H. Tucker	1,160	30.4%
Turnout			51.0%
Labour hold			

=== Pitsea East ===
Location of Pitsea East ward

Pitsea East
Party	Candidate	Votes	%
Labour	M. Baker	2,124	60.3%
Conservative	J. Harrington	1,399	39.7%
Turnout			33.5%
Labour hold			

=== Pitsea West ===
Location of Pitsea West ward

Pitsea West
Party	Candidate	Votes	%
Labour	D. Marks	1,912	69.3%
Conservative	P. Cleland	664	24.1%
SLD	J. Smith	184	6.7%
Turnout			31.0%
Labour hold			

=== Vange ===
Location of Vange ward

Vange
Party	Candidate	Votes	%
Labour	R. Cowie	1,653	62.0%
Conservative	S. Ryder	842	31.6%
SLD	B. Wakeham	169	6.3%
Turnout			33.9%
Labour hold			

=== Wickford North ===
Location of Wickford North ward

Wickford North
Party	Candidate	Votes	%
Conservative	B. Pummell	1,681	43.7%
SLD	D. Harrison	1,523	39.6%
Labour	E. Harrison	639	16.6%
Turnout			44.0%
Conservative hold			

=== Wickford South ===
Location of Wickford South ward

Wickford South
Party	Candidate	Votes	%
Conservative	M. Buckley	1,763	48.0%
SLD	G. Palmer	1,390	37.8%
Labour	T. Hazlewood	520	14.2%
Turnout			39.9%
Conservative gain from SLD			
