= 1998 Basildon District Council election =

1998 UK local government election

← 1996	7 May 1998	1999 →

16 of the 42 seats to Basildon District Council 22 seats needed for a majority
	First party	Second party	Third party
Party	Labour	Liberal Democrats	Conservative
Seats before	24	16	2
Seats won	9	2	5
Seats after	23	13	6
Seat change	▼1	▼3	▲4
Popular vote	12,464	7,993	11,046
Percentage	39.5%	25.3%	35.0%
- Map showing the results of contested wards in the 1998 Basildon Borough Council elections.
Council control before election
Labour
Council control after election
Labour

The 1998 Basildon District Council election took place on 7 May 1998 to elect members of Basildon District Council in Essex, England. One third of the council was up for election and the Labour Party stayed in overall control of the council.

After the election, the composition of the council was:

- Labour 23
- Liberal Democrats 13
- Conservative 6

== Election result ==
1998 Basildon local election result
Party	Seats	Gains	Losses	Net gain/loss	Seats %	Votes %	Votes	+/−
Labour	9	0	1	▼1	56.3	39.5	12,464	▼2.0
Conservative	5	4	0	▲5	31.3	35.0	11,046	▲6.8
Liberal Democrats	2	0	3	▼4	12.5	25.3	7,993	▼4.7
Socialist Alliance	0	0	0	Steady	0.0	0.2	59	New

All comparisons in vote share are to the corresponding 1994 election.

== Ward results ==
=== Billericay East ===
Location of Billericay East ward

Billericay East
Party	Candidate	Votes	%
Conservative	Peter Patrick	1,205	51.9%
Liberal Democrats	R. Dowden	815	35.1%
Labour	P. Reid	301	13.0%
Turnout			26.2%
Conservative gain from Liberal Democrats			

=== Billericay West ===
Location of Billericay West ward

Billericay West
Party	Candidate	Votes	%
Liberal Democrats	Michael Barr	1,231	46.0%
Conservative	S. Horgan	1,196	44.7%
Labour	R. Austin	248	9.3%
Turnout			25.7%
Liberal Democrats hold			

=== Burstead ===
Location of Burstead ward

Burstead
Party	Candidate	Votes	%
Conservative	Geoffrey Buckenham	1,061	45.8%
Liberal Democrats	G. Taylor	908	39.2%
Labour	M. Viney	348	15.0%
Turnout			26.4%
Conservative gain from Liberal Democrats			

=== Fryerns Central ===
Location of Fryerns Central ward

Fryerns Central
Party	Candidate	Votes	%
Labour	Paul Kirkman	1,424	72.1%
Conservative	A. Hedley	324	16.4%
Liberal Democrats	M. Dickinson	226	11.4%
Turnout			24.7%
Labour hold			

=== Fryerns East ===
Location of Fryerns East ward

Fryerns East
Party	Candidate	Votes	%
Labour	John Potter	1,261	73.1%
Conservative	D. Morris	321	18.6%
Liberal Democrats	J. Lutton	144	8.3%
Turnout			22.4%
Labour hold			

=== Laindon ===
Location of Laindon ward

Laindon
Party	Candidate	Votes	%
Labour	Colin Payn	1,158	51.6%
Conservative	D. Walsh	812	36.2%
Liberal Democrats	V. Howard	275	12.2%
Turnout			23.2%
Labour hold			

=== Langdon Hills ===
Location of Langdon Hills ward

Langdon Hills
Party	Candidate	Votes	%
Conservative	S. Hillier	1,191	45.3%
Labour	M. Larkin	1,176	44.7%
Liberal Democrats	L. Williams	261	9.9%
Turnout			27.4%
Conservative gain from Labour			

=== Lee Chapel ===
Location of Lee Chapel ward

Lee Chapel
Party	Candidate	Votes	%
Labour	Nigel Smith	1,309	63.6%
Conservative	M. Levey	474	23.0%
Liberal Democrats	M. Dale	274	13.3%
Turnout			27.3%
Labour hold			

=== Nethermayne ===
Location of Nethermayne ward

Nethermayne
Party	Candidate	Votes	%
Liberal Democrats	Geoff Williams	1,431	54.2%
Labour	T. Lomas	747	28.3%
Conservative	S. Allen	460	17.4%
Turnout			38.7%
Liberal Democrats hold			

=== Pitsea East ===
Location of Pitsea East ward

Pitsea East
Party	Candidate	Votes	%
Labour	Dave Marks	1,187	
Labour	R. Rackham	1,040	
Conservative	K. Blake	860	
Conservative	P. Turner	796	
Liberal Democrats	D. Birch	209	
Liberal Democrats	A. Ferriss	171	
Socialist Alliance	D. Murray	59	
Turnout			21.6%
Labour hold			

=== Pitsea West ===
Location of Pitsea West ward

Pitsea West
Party	Candidate	Votes	%
Labour	P. Ballard	1,140	66.4%
Conservative	C. Coombes	395	23.0%
Liberal Democrats	J. Barr	183	10.7%
Turnout			20.4%
Labour hold			

=== Vange ===
Location of Vange ward

Vange
Party	Candidate	Votes	%
Labour	F. Kirkman	909	
Labour	L. Rossati	873	
Conservative	R. Cornish	349	
Conservative	S. Hillier	319	
Liberal Democrats	P. Jenkins	137	
Liberal Democrats	T. Marsh	124	
Turnout			18.1%
Labour hold			

=== Wickford North ===
Location of Wickford North ward

Wickford North
Party	Candidate	Votes	%
Conservative	Tony Ball	1,052	38.8%
Liberal Democrats	M. Birch	1,042	38.5%
Labour	C. Wilson	614	22.7%
Turnout			29.2%
Conservative gain from Liberal Democrats			

=== Wickford South ===
Location of Wickford South ward

Wickford South
Party	Candidate	Votes	%
Conservative	Sylvia Buckley	1,346	47.3%
Liberal Democrats	J. Pattison	857	30.1%
Labour	A. Ede	642	22.6%
Turnout			25.1%
Conservative gain from Liberal Democrats			
