= 1992 Basildon District Council election =

1992 UK local government election

| ← 1991 | 7 May 1992 | 1994 → |

15 of the 42 seats to Basildon District Council 22 seats needed for a majority
| | First party | Second party | Third party |
|---|---|---|---|
| Party | Conservative | Labour | Liberal Democrats |
| Seats before | 17 | 21 | 4 |
| Seats won | 15 | 0 | 0 |
| Seats after | 26 | 13 | 3 |
| Seat change | ▲9 | ▼8 | ▼1 |
| Popular vote | 35,878 | 14,984 | 7,244 |
| Percentage | 61.7% | 25.8% | 12.5% |
- Map showing the results of contested wards in the 1992 Basildon Borough Council elections.
Council control before election
No overall control
Council control after election
Conservative Party

The 1992 Basildon District Council election took place on 7 May 1992 to elect members of Basildon District Council in Essex, England. This was on the same day as other local elections. One third of the council was up for election; the seats which were last contested in 1988. The Conservative Party won every seat up for election, and gained control of the council for the first time, which had previously been under no overall control.

== Overall results ==
1992 Basildon District Council Election
| Party | Seats | Gains | Losses | Net gain/loss | Seats % | Votes % | Votes | +/− |
|---|---|---|---|---|---|---|---|---|
| Conservative | 15 | 9 | 0 | ▲9 | 100.0 | 61.7 | 35,878 | ▲21.5 |
| Labour | 0 | 0 | 8 | ▼8 | 0.0 | 25.8 | 14,984 | ▼12.0 |
| Liberal Democrats | 0 | 0 | 1 | ▼1 | 0.0 | 12.5 | 7,244 | ▼9.5 |
| Independent | 0 | 0 | 0 | Steady | 0.0 | 0.1 | 50 | New |
| Total | 15 | | | | | | 58,156 | |

All comparisons in vote share are to the corresponding 1988 election.

== Ward results ==
=== Billericay East ===
Location of Billericay East ward

Billericay East
| Party | Candidate | Votes | % |
|---|---|---|---|
| Conservative | P. Patrick | 2,812 | 71.9% |
| Liberal Democrats | M. Barr | 733 | 18.8% |
| Labour | R. Llewellyn | 364 | 9.3% |
| Turnout | | | 45.9% |
| Conservative hold | | | |

=== Billericay West (2 seats) ===
Location of Billericay West ward

Billericay West (2)
| Party | Candidate | Votes | % |
|---|---|---|---|
| Conservative | D. Guest | 3,105 | |
| Conservative | B. Rees | 3,067 | |
| Liberal Democrats | P. Johnson | 684 | |
| Liberal Democrats | A. Ferriss | 671 | |
| Labour | H. Bruce | 292 | |
| Labour | H. Witzer | 249 | |
| Turnout | | | 44.3% |
| Conservative hold | | | |
| Conservative hold | | | |

=== Burstead ===
Location of Burstead ward

Burstead
| Party | Candidate | Votes | % |
|---|---|---|---|
| Conservative | R. Burrell | 2,984 | 71.2% |
| Liberal Democrats | G. Taylor | 877 | 20.9% |
| Labour | G. Krejzl | 328 | 7.8% |
| Turnout | | | 50.6% |
| Conservative hold | | | |

=== Fryerns Central ===
Location of Fryerns Central ward

Fryerns Central
| Party | Candidate | Votes | % |
|---|---|---|---|
| Conservative | S. Allens | 1,828 | 46.5% |
| Labour | R. Bolt | 1,644 | 41.8% |
| Liberal Democrats | J. Smith | 459 | 11.7% |
| Turnout | | | 46.4% |
| Conservative gain from Labour | | | |

=== Fryerns East ===
Location of Fryerns East ward

Fryerns East
| Party | Candidate | Votes | % |
|---|---|---|---|
| Conservative | D. Allen | 1,648 | 46.4% |
| Labour | E. Gelder | 1,553 | 43.7% |
| Liberal Democrats | J. Lutton | 354 | 10.0% |
| Turnout | | | 44.4% |
| Conservative gain from Labour | | | |

=== Laindon ===
Location of Laindon ward

Laindon
| Party | Candidate | Votes | % |
|---|---|---|---|
| Conservative | B. Jones | 2,727 | 63.4% |
| Labour | V. Walker | 1,219 | 28.3% |
| Liberal Democrats | M. Martin | 354 | 8.2% |
| Turnout | | | 48.6% |
| Conservative gain from Labour | | | |

=== Langdon Hills ===
Location of Langdon Hills ward

Langdon Hills
| Party | Candidate | Votes | % |
|---|---|---|---|
| Conservative | S. Lake | 2,622 | 60.5% |
| Labour | A. Lockyer | 1,407 | 32.5% |
| Liberal Democrats | E. Evans | 305 | 7.0% |
| Turnout | | | 48.7% |
| Conservative hold | | | |

=== Lee Chapel North ===
Location of Lee Chapel North ward

Lee Chapel North
| Party | Candidate | Votes | % |
|---|---|---|---|
| Conservative | T. Fleet | 2,121 | 54.1% |
| Labour | R. Fitzgibbon | 1,592 | 40.6% |
| Liberal Democrats | T. Low | 209 | 5.3% |
| Turnout | | | 50.6% |
| Conservative gain from Labour | | | |

=== Nethermayne ===
Location of Nethermayne ward

Nethermayne
| Party | Candidate | Votes | % |
|---|---|---|---|
| Conservative | S. Blackbourn | 2,182 | 51.5% |
| Labour | C. Wilson | 1,064 | 25.1% |
| Liberal Democrats | C. Jones | 990 | 23.4% |
| Turnout | | | 57.7% |
| Conservative gain from Labour | | | |

=== Pitsea East ===
Location of Pitsea East ward

Pitsea East
| Party | Candidate | Votes | % |
|---|---|---|---|
| Conservative | K. Blake | 3,032 | 63.5% |
| Labour | P. Kirkman | 1,528 | 32.0% |
| Liberal Democrats | L. Williams | 216 | 4.5% |
| Turnout | | | 43.6% |
| Conservative gain from Labour | | | |

=== Pitsea West ===
Location of Pitsea West ward

Pitsea West
| Party | Candidate | Votes | % |
|---|---|---|---|
| Conservative | C. Coombes | 2,017 | 52.7% |
| Labour | D. Marks | 1,601 | 41.8% |
| Liberal Democrats | B. Mavis | 212 | 5.5% |
| Turnout | | | 44.6% |
| Conservative gain from Labour | | | |

=== Vange ===
Location of Vange ward

Vange
| Party | Candidate | Votes | % |
|---|---|---|---|
| Conservative | D. Shields | 1,941 | 53.3% |
| Labour | R. Cowie | 1,479 | 40.6% |
| Liberal Democrats | J. Campbell | 219 | 6.0% |
| Turnout | | | 47.1% |
| Conservative gain from Labour | | | |

=== Wickford North ===
Location of Wickford North ward

Wickford North
| Party | Candidate | Votes | % |
|---|---|---|---|
| Conservative | B. Pummell | 3,364 | 73.9% |
| Liberal Democrats | E. Carter | 651 | 14.3% |
| Labour | C. Wilson | 536 | 11.8% |
| Turnout | | | 49.8% |
| Conservative gain from Labour | | | |

=== Wickford South ===
Location of Wickford South ward

Wickford South
| Party | Candidate | Votes | % |
|---|---|---|---|
| Conservative | M. Buckley | 3,495 | 71.3% |
| Liberal Democrats | R. Allen | 981 | 20.0% |
| Labour | L. Martin | 377 | 7.7% |
| Independent | R. Burge | 50 | 1.0% |
| Turnout | | | 53.2% |
| Conservative hold | | | |
