= 1995 Basildon District Council election =

1995 UK local government election

← 1994	4 May 1995	1996 →

14 of the 42 seats to Basildon District Council 22 seats needed for a majority
	First party	Second party	Third party
Party	Labour	Conservative	Liberal Democrats
Seats before	13	19	8
Seats won	8	0	6
Seats after	16	14	12
Seat change	▲3	▼5	▲4
Popular vote	22,614	13,124	10,994
Percentage	48.3%	28.0%	23.5%
- Map showing the results of contested wards in the 1995 Basildon Borough Council elections.
Council control before election
No overall control
Council control after election
No overall control

The 1995 Basildon District Council election took place on 4 May 1995 to elect members of Basildon District Council in Essex, England. This was on the same day as other local elections. One third of the council was up for election; the seats which were last contested in 1991. The council remained under no overall control.

== Overall results ==
1995 Basildon District Council Election
Party	Seats	Gains	Losses	Net gain/loss	Seats %	Votes %	Votes	+/−
Labour	8	3	0	▲3	57.1	48.3	22,614	▲18.3
Liberal Democrats	6	4	0	▲4	42.9	23.5	10,994	▼1.7
Conservative	0	0	7	▼7	0.0	28.0	13,124	▼16.8
Militant Labour	0	0	0	Steady	0.0	0.2	86	New
Total	14						46,818	

All comparisons in vote share are to the corresponding 1991 election.

== Ward results ==
=== Billericay East ===
Location of Billericay East ward

Billericay East
Party	Candidate	Votes	%
Liberal Democrats	F. Bellard	1,499	42.1%
Conservative	B. Lea	1,323	37.1%
Labour	P. Clark	742	20.8%
Turnout			40.3%
Liberal Democrats gain from Conservative			

=== Billericay West ===
Location of Billericay West ward

Billericay West
Party	Candidate	Votes	%
Liberal Democrats	J. Macpherson	1,876	46.1%
Conservative	F. Tomlin	1,673	41.1%
Labour	R. Bessell	524	12.9%
Turnout			40.2%
Liberal Democrats gain from Conservative			

=== Burstead ===
Location of Burstead ward

Burstead
Party	Candidate	Votes	%
Liberal Democrats	G. Bellard	1,451	43.0%
Conservative	G. Buckenham	1,291	38.3%
Labour	A. Lockyer	631	18.7%
Turnout			39.4%
Liberal Democrats gain from Conservative			

=== Fryerns Central ===
Location of Fryerns Central ward

Fryerns Central
Party	Candidate	Votes	%
Labour	P. Charles	2,513	77.7%
Conservative	W. Marck	442	13.7%
Liberal Democrats	K. Tyson	280	8.7%
Turnout			40.5%
Labour hold			

=== Fryerns East ===
Location of Fryerns East ward

Fryerns East
Party	Candidate	Votes	%
Labour	A. Dove	2,214	77.1%
Conservative	S. Evens	408	14.2%
Liberal Democrats	J. Lutton	250	8.7%
Turnout			37.1%
Labour hold			

=== Laindon ===
Location of Laindon ward

Laindon
Party	Candidate	Votes	%
Labour	T. Weldon	2,027	56.1%
Conservative	V. York	1,271	35.2%
Liberal Democrats	M. Martin	313	8.7%
Turnout			40.4%
Labour gain from Conservative			

=== Langdon Hills ===
Location of Langdon Hills ward

Langdon Hills
Party	Candidate	Votes	%
Labour	R. Sears	2,103	57.4%
Conservative	S. Horgan	1,232	33.6%
Liberal Democrats	S. Evans	327	8.9%
Turnout			40.1%
Labour gain from Conservative			

=== Lee Chapel North ===
Location of Lee Chapel North ward

Lee Chapel North
Party	Candidate	Votes	%
Labour	L. Gordon	2,467	79.5%
Conservative	M. Amson	638	20.5%
Turnout			41.0%
Labour hold			

=== Nethermayne ===
Location of Nethermayne ward

Nethermayne
Party	Candidate	Votes	%
Liberal Democrats	J. White	1,548	43.6%
Conservative	S. Caira-Neeson	1,362	38.4%
Labour	S. Elliott	640	18.0%
Turnout			51.3%
Liberal Democrats hold			

=== Pitsea East ===
Location of Pitsea East ward

Pitsea East
Party	Candidate	Votes	%
Labour	C. Alderson	2,045	62.7%
Conservative	R. Sheridan	841	25.8%
Liberal Democrats	D. Neale	289	8.9%
Militant (Trotskyist group)	D. Murray	86	2.6%
Turnout			30.5%
Labour gain from Conservative			

=== Pitsea West ===
Location of Pitsea West ward

Pitsea West
Party	Candidate	Votes	%
Labour	D. Abrahall	2,090	76.7%
Conservative	H. Marshall	425	15.6%
Liberal Democrats	L. Williams	210	7.7%
Turnout			32.0%
Labour hold			

=== Vange ===
Location of Vange ward

Vange
Party	Candidate	Votes	%
Labour	M. Bruce	1,894	76.8%
Conservative	S. Hillier	385	15.6%
Liberal Democrats	F. Thomas	186	7.5%
Turnout			32.7%
Labour hold			

=== Wickford North ===
Location of Wickford North ward

Wickford North
Party	Candidate	Votes	%
Liberal Democrats	C. Sweeney	1,432	38.6%
Conservative	A. Sharpe	1,226	33.0%
Labour	C. Wilson	1,056	28.4%
Turnout			40.0%
Liberal Democrats gain from Conservative			

=== Wickford South ===
Location of Wickford South ward

Wickford South
Party	Candidate	Votes	%
Liberal Democrats	A. Banton	1,333	36.9%
Conservative	D. Morris	1,329	36.8%
Labour	B. Sime	946	26.2%
Turnout			36.5%
Liberal Democrats hold			
