= 2003 Basildon District Council election =

2003 UK local government election

← 2002	1 May 2003	2004 →

14 of the 42 seats to Basildon District Council 22 seats needed for a majority
	First party	Second party	Third party
Party	Conservative	Labour	Liberal Democrats
Last election	21	18	3
Seats before	21	16	3
Seats won	8	5	1
Seats after	23	14	3
Seat change	▲2	▼4	▼1
Popular vote	12,090	7,441	5,255
Percentage	45.3%	27.9%	19.7%
	Fourth party
Party	Basildon Independent Residents
Last election	0
Seats before	2
Seats won	0
Seats after	2
Seat change	Steady
Popular vote	N/A
Percentage	N/A
- Map of the results of the 2003 Basildon council election. Conservatives in blue, Labour in red and Liberal Democrats in yellow. Wards in grey were not contested in 2003.
Council control before election
No overall control
Council control after election
Conservative Party

The 2003 Basildon District Council election took place on 1 May 2003 to elect members of Basildon District Council in Essex, England. One third of the council was up for election and the Conservative Party gained overall control of the council from no overall control.

After the election, the composition of the council was:

- Conservative 23
- Labour 14
- Liberal Democrats 3
- Basildon Independent Residents 2

== Background ==
The previous election in 2002 saw the Conservatives win exactly half of the seats, but Labour remained in control of the council with the support of the Liberal Democrats. However 6 months before the 2003 election 2 Labour councillors defected and the Conservatives took over the administration of the council.

== Election results ==
The results saw the Conservatives win a majority for only the second time in the history of Basildon council.

Following the election the Labour leader on the council Nigel Smith was replaced by his group with Paul Kirkman.

2003 Basildon local election result
Party	Seats	Gains	Losses	Net gain/loss	Seats %	Votes %	Votes	+/−
Conservative	8	2	0	▲2	57.1	45.3	12,090	
Labour	5	0	2	▼2	35.7	27.9	7,441	
Liberal Democrats	1	0	0	Steady	7.1	19.7	5,255	
BNP	0	0	0	Steady	0.0	4.1	1,104	
Independent	0	0	0	Steady	0.0	1.9	510	
Green	0	0	0	Steady	0.0	1.1	299	

== Ward results ==
=== Billericay East ===
Location of Billericay East ward

Billericay East
Party	Candidate	Votes	%
Conservative	David Dadds	1,563	66.2
Liberal Democrats	James Edwards	526	22.3
Labour	Patricia Reid	272	11.5
Majority		1,037	43.9
Turnout		2,361	
Conservative hold			

=== Billericay West ===
Location of Billericay West ward

Billericay West
Party	Candidate	Votes	%
Conservative	Stephen Horgan	1,712	69.5
Liberal Democrats	Geoffrey Taylor	514	20.9
Labour	Geoffrey Viney	238	9.7
Majority		1,198	48.6
Turnout		2,464	
Conservative hold			

=== Burstead ===
Location of Burstead ward

Burstead
Party	Candidate	Votes	%
Conservative	Kevin Blake	1,213	51.6
Liberal Democrats	Belinda Jackson	902	38.4
Labour	Margaret Viney	234	10.0
Majority		311	13.2
Turnout		2,349	
Conservative hold			

=== Fryerns ===
Location of Fryerns ward

Fryerns
Party	Candidate	Votes	%
Labour	Julia Woods	966	43.4
BNP	William Bake	487	21.9
Conservative	Kenneth Evens	427	19.2
Liberal Democrats	John Lutton	223	10.0
Green	Adam Ellis	124	5.6
Majority		479	21.5
Turnout		2,227	
Labour hold			

=== Laindon Park ===
Location of Laindon Park ward

Laindon Park
Party	Candidate	Votes	%
Conservative	David Walsh	844	43.6
Labour	Anthony Borlase	780	40.3
Liberal Democrats	Dorothy Edwards	163	8.4
Independent	Jason Richardson	97	5.0
Independent	Michael Payne	51	2.6
Majority		64	3.3
Turnout		1,935	
Conservative gain from Labour			

=== Lee Chapel North ===
Lee Chapel North ward in Basildon 2002

Lee Chapel North
Party	Candidate	Votes	%
Labour	Richard Rackham	766	40.6
Conservative	Richard Hyland	434	23.0
BNP	Sidney Chaney	285	15.1
Liberal Democrats	Michael Martin	207	11.0
Green	Ernest Humphries	114	6.0
Independent	Steven Denne	80	4.2
Majority		332	17.6
Turnout		1,886	
Labour hold			

=== Nethermayne ===
Location of Nethermayne ward

Nethermayne
Party	Candidate	Votes	%
Liberal Democrats	Benjamin Williams	1,168	48.1
Labour	Lynda Gordon	672	27.7
Conservative	Henry Tucker	586	24.2
Majority		496	20.4
Turnout		2,426	
Liberal Democrats hold			

=== Pitsea North West ===
Location of Pitsea North West ward

Pitsea North West
Party	Candidate	Votes	%
Labour	Philip Rackley	738	48.3
Conservative	Mark Levey	541	35.4
Liberal Democrats	Martin Howard	248	16.2
Majority		197	12.9
Turnout		1,527	
Labour hold			

=== Pitsea South East ===
Location of Pitsea South East ward

Pitsea South East
Party	Candidate	Votes	%
Conservative	Malcolm Geddes	771	36.1
Labour	Michael Plant	717	33.6
BNP	David King	332	15.5
Liberal Democrats	Vivien Howard	169	7.9
Independent	Raymond Abrahall	87	4.1
Green	David Wilkinson	61	2.9
Majority		54	2.5
Turnout		2,137	
Conservative gain from Labour			

=== St Martin's ===
Location of St Martin's ward

St Martin's
Party	Candidate	Votes	%
Labour	Colin Payn	563	47.0
Conservative	Deborah Allen	351	29.3
Liberal Democrats	Michael Dickinson	178	14.8
Independent	Alfred Viccary	107	8.9
Majority		212	17.7
Turnout		1,199	
Labour hold			

=== Vange ===
Location of Vange ward

Vange
Party	Candidate	Votes	%
Labour	Swatantra Nandanwar	507	41.9
Conservative	Philip Johnson	452	37.4
Liberal Democrats	Mark Hersom	163	13.5
Independent	John Cord	88	7.3
Majority		55	4.5
Turnout		1,210	
Labour hold			

=== Wickford Castledon ===
Location of Wickford Castleton ward

Wickford Castledon
Party	Candidate	Votes	%
Conservative	Sylvia Buckley	1,121	68.1
Labour	Andrew Powderly	269	16.3
Liberal Democrats	Fane Cummings	256	15.6
Majority		852	51.8
Turnout		1,646	
Conservative hold			

=== Wickford North ===
Location of Wickford North ward

Wickford North
Party	Candidate	Votes	%
Conservative	Michael Mowe	1,396	63.4
Labour	Clive Thomas	451	20.5
Liberal Democrats	Ian Robertson	355	16.1
Majority		945	42.9
Turnout		2,202	
Conservative hold			

=== Wickford Park ===
Location of Wickford Park ward

Wickford Park
Party	Candidate	Votes	%
Conservative	Christopher Jackson	679	60.1
Labour	Christopher Wilson	268	23.7
Liberal Democrats	Michael Woods	183	16.2
Majority		411	36.4
Turnout		1,130	
Conservative hold			
