= 1994 Basildon District Council election =

1994 UK local government election

← 1992	5 May 1994	1995 →

14 of the 42 seats to Basildon District Council 22 seats needed for a majority
	First party	Second party	Third party
Party	Conservative	Labour	Liberal Democrats
Seats before	26	13	3
Seats won	0	8	6
Seats after	19	13	8
Seat change	▼7	Steady	▲5
Popular vote	15,407	22,699	16,405
Percentage	28.2%	41.5%	30.0%
- Map showing the results of contested wards in the 1994 Basildon Borough Council elections.
Council control before election
Conservative Party
Council control after election
No overall control

The 1994 Basildon District Council election took place on 5 May 1994 to elect members of Basildon District Council in Essex, England. This was on the same day as other local elections. One third of the council was up for election; the seats which were last contested in 1990. The Conservative Party lost control of the council, which fell under no overall control.

== Overall results ==
1994 Basildon District Council Election
Party	Seats	Gains	Losses	Net gain/loss	Seats %	Votes %	Votes	+/−
Labour	8	0	0	Steady	57.1	41.5	22,699	▲3.2
Liberal Democrats	6	5	0	▲5	42.9	30.0	16,405	▲9.8
Conservative	0	0	5	▼5	0.0	28.2	15,407	▼10.6
Independent	0	0	0	Steady	0.0	0.3	144	New
Total	14						54,655	

All comparisons in vote share are to the corresponding 1990 election.

== Ward results ==
=== Billericay East ===
Location of Billericay East ward

Billericay East
Party	Candidate	Votes	%
Liberal Democrats	M. Larkin	2,193	53.7%
Conservative	A. Archer	1,337	32.7%
Labour	D. Abrahall	557	13.6%
Turnout			46.7%
Liberal Democrats gain from Conservative			

=== Billericay West ===
Location of Billericay West ward

Billericay West
Party	Candidate	Votes	%
Liberal Democrats	M. Barr	2,601	60.6%
Conservative	J. Bay	1,344	31.3%
Labour	R. Bessell	350	8.1%
Turnout			43.3%
Liberal Democrats gain from Conservative			

=== Burstead ===
Location of Burstead ward

Burstead
Party	Candidate	Votes	%
Liberal Democrats	G. Taylor	2,190	54.8%
Conservative	J. Kay	1,357	34.0%
Labour	P. Charles	447	11.2%
Turnout			47.0%
Liberal Democrats gain from Conservative			

=== Fryerns Central ===
Location of Fryerns Central ward

Fryerns Central
Party	Candidate	Votes	%
Labour	P. Kirkman	2,669	69.3%
Conservative	P. Turner	692	18.0%
Liberal Democrats	K. Tyson	489	12.7%
Turnout			47.6%
Labour hold			

=== Fryerns East ===
Location of Fryerns East ward

Fryerns East
Party	Candidate	Votes	%
Labour	J. Potter	2,378	66.8%
Conservative	S. Evens	636	17.9%
Liberal Democrats	J. Lutton	544	15.3%
Turnout			45.2%
Labour hold			

=== Laindon ===
Location of Laindon ward

Laindon
Party	Candidate	Votes	%
Labour	M. Baker	2,089	53.7%
Conservative	S. Reid	1,239	31.9%
Liberal Democrats	C. Sweeney	559	14.4%
Turnout			43.7%
Labour hold			

=== Langdon Hills ===
Location of Langdon Hills ward

Langdon Hills
Party	Candidate	Votes	%
Labour	L. Webb	2,234	50.5%
Conservative	S. Horgan	1,547	35.0%
Liberal Democrats	S. Evans	645	14.6%
Turnout			49.4%
Labour hold			

=== Lee Chapel North ===
Location of Lee Chapel North ward

Lee Chapel North
Party	Candidate	Votes	%
Labour	R. Austin	2,469	67.8%
Conservative	A. Almond	732	20.1%
Liberal Democrats	T. Low	438	12.0%
Turnout			48.3%
Labour hold			

=== Nethermayne ===
Location of Nethermayne ward

Nethermayne
Party	Candidate	Votes	%
Liberal Democrats	G. Williams	1,768	45.0%
Labour	C. Wilson	1,278	32.5%
Conservative	S. Elliott	885	22.5%
Turnout			56.0%
Liberal Democrats hold			

=== Pitsea East ===
Location of Pitsea East ward

Pitsea East
Party	Candidate	Votes	%
Labour	D. Markes	2,356	57.2%
Conservative	A. Diamond	1,268	30.8%
Liberal Democrats	L. Williams	497	12.1%
Turnout			38.6%
Labour hold			

=== Pitsea West ===
Location of Pitsea West ward

Pitsea West
Party	Candidate	Votes	%
Labour	J. Carty	2,254	70.1%
Conservative	H. Marshall	602	18.7%
Liberal Democrats	B. Williams	360	11.2%
Turnout			38.7%
Labour hold			

=== Vange ===
Location of Vange ward

Vange
Party	Candidate	Votes	%
Labour	L. Rossati	2,078	66.7%
Conservative	A. Elliott	645	20.7%
Liberal Democrats	J. Campbell	391	12.6%
Turnout			41.0%
Labour hold			

=== Wickford North ===
Location of Wickford North ward

Wickford North
Party	Candidate	Votes	%
Liberal Democrats	M. Birch	2,012	46.6%
Conservative	S. Buckley	1,477	34.2%
Labour	C. Wilson	828	19.2%
Turnout			46.5%
Liberal Democrats gain from Conservative			

=== Wickford South ===
Location of Wickford South ward

Wickford South
Party	Candidate	Votes	%
Liberal Democrats	J. Pattison	1,718	40.7%
Conservative	D. Morris	1,646	39.0%
Labour	F. Curl	712	16.9%
Independent	R. Burge	144	3.4%
Turnout			44.5%
Liberal Democrats gain from Conservative			
