= 1982 Basildon District Council election =

1982 UK local government election

| ← 1980 | 6 May 1982 | 1983 → |

17 of the 42 seats to Basildon District Council 22 seats needed for a majority
| | First party | Second party |
|---|---|---|
| Party | Labour | Conservative |
| Last election | 20 | 13 |
| Seats before | 19 | 13 |
| Seats won | 9 | 6 |
| Seats after | 22 | 12 |
| Seat change | ▲3 | ▼1 |
| Popular vote | 13,852 | 14,979 |
| Percentage | 32.3% | 35.0% |
| | Third party | Fourth party |
| Party | Residents | Alliance |
| Last election | 9 | 0 |
| Seats before | 9 | 1 |
| Seats won | 0 | 2 |
| Seats after | 5 | 3 |
| Seat change | ▼4 | ▲2 |
| Popular vote | 3,501 | 10,348 |
| Percentage | 8.2% | 24.2% |
- Map showing the results of contested wards in the 1982 Basildon Borough Council elections.
Council control before election
No overall control
Council control after election
Labour Party

The 1982 Basildon District Council election took place on 6 May 1982 to elect members of Basildon District Council in Essex, England. This was on the same day as other local elections. One third of the council was up for election; the seats of the candidates who finished second in each ward in the all-out election of 1979. The Labour Party gained control of the council, which had previously been under no overall control.

== Overall results ==
1982 Basildon District Council Election
| Party | Seats | Gains | Losses | Net gain/loss | Seats % | Votes % | Votes | +/− |
|---|---|---|---|---|---|---|---|---|
| Labour | 9 | 3 | 0 | ▲3 | 52.9 | 32.3 | 13,852 | |
| Conservative | 6 | 4 | 5 | ▼1 | 35.3 | 35.0 | 14,979 | |
| Alliance | 2 | 2 | 0 | ▲2 | 11.8 | 24.2 | 10,348 | |
| Residents | 0 | 0 | 4 | ▼4 | 0.0 | 8.2 | 3,501 | |
| Independent | 0 | 0 | 0 | Steady | 0.0 | 0.4 | 165 | |
| Total | 17 | | | | | | 42,094 | |

== Ward results ==
=== Billericay East (2 seats) ===
Location of Billericay East ward

Billericay East (2)
| Party | Candidate | Votes | % |
|---|---|---|---|
| Conservative | A. Archer | 1,634 | |
| Conservative | W. Lea | 1,611 | |
| Residents | S. Davis | 1,061 | |
| Residents | A. Waddoups | 1,011 | |
| Alliance | A. Lycett | 590 | |
| Alliance | G. Cronkshaw | 567 | |
| Labour | S. Townsend | 407 | |
| Labour | W. Hodge | 373 | |
| Turnout | | | 44.8% |
| Conservative gain from Residents | | | |
| Conservative gain from Residents | | | |

=== Billericay West ===
Location of Billericay West ward

Billericay West
| Party | Candidate | Votes | % |
|---|---|---|---|
| Conservative | F. Tomlin | 1,586 | 45.0% |
| Residents | T. Stansfield | 1,295 | 36.7% |
| Alliance | G. Taylor | 420 | 11.9% |
| Labour | R. Pattle | 226 | 6.4% |
| Turnout | | | 46.8% |
| Conservative gain from Residents | | | |

=== Burstead ===
Location of Burstead ward

Burstead
| Party | Candidate | Votes | % |
|---|---|---|---|
| Conservative | M. Marshall | 1,581 | 45.9% |
| Residents | B. Hooks | 1,145 | 33.3% |
| Labour | I. Harlow | 373 | 10.8% |
| Alliance | P. Blacklock | 343 | 10.0% |
| Turnout | | | 41.6% |
| Conservative gain from Residents | | | |

=== Fryerns Central ===
Location of Fryerns Central ward

Fryerns Central
| Party | Candidate | Votes | % |
|---|---|---|---|
| Labour | A. Borlase | 1,524 | 46.2% |
| Alliance | J. White | 1,001 | 30.3% |
| Conservative | R. Sheridan | 610 | 18.5% |
| Independent Residents | B. Chaplin | 165 | 5.0% |
| Turnout | | | 36.2% |
| Labour hold | | | |

=== Fryerns East ===
Location of Fryerns East ward

Fryerns East
| Party | Candidate | Votes | % |
|---|---|---|---|
| Labour | J. Potter | 1,408 | 58.2% |
| Conservative | L. Tilt | 552 | 22.8% |
| Alliance | A. Hendry | 461 | 19.0% |
| Turnout | | | 29.4% |
| Labour hold | | | |

=== Laindon ===
Location of Laindon ward

Laindon
| Party | Candidate | Votes | % |
|---|---|---|---|
| Conservative | V. York | 1,180 | 43.5% |
| Labour | P. Rackley | 1,020 | 37.6% |
| SDP | A. Clark | 395 | 14.5% |
| Liberal | D. Wilson | 120 | 4.4% |
| Turnout | | | 40.0% |
| Conservative hold | | | |

=== Langdon Hills ===
Location of Langdon Hills ward

Langdon Hills
| Party | Candidate | Votes | % |
|---|---|---|---|
| Alliance | R. Payne | 1,180 | 43.5% |
| Labour | W. Blunkell | 742 | 29.1% |
| Conservative | J. Hunter | 673 | 26.4% |
| Turnout | | | 36.2% |
| Alliance gain from Conservative | | | |

=== Lee Chapel North (2 seats) ===
Location of Lee Chapel North ward

Lee Chapel North (2)
| Party | Candidate | Votes | % |
|---|---|---|---|
| Labour | P. Moloney | 1,602 | |
| Labour | R. Fitzgibbon | 1,591 | |
| Alliance | M. Gill | 919 | |
| Alliance | H. Lutton | 771 | |
| Conservative | D. Almond | 541 | |
| Conservative | A. Almond | 519 | |
| Turnout | | | 38.9% |
| Labour hold | | | |

=== Nethermayne (2 seats) ===
Location of Nethermayne ward

Nethermayne (2)
| Party | Candidate | Votes | % |
|---|---|---|---|
| Labour | M. Bruce | 1,199 | |
| Labour | E. Gelder | 1,099 | |
| Alliance | J. Bassett | 1,035 | |
| Alliance | J. Lutton | 1,021 | |
| Conservative | P. Cole | 1,020 | |
| Conservative | H. Tucker | 984 | |
| Turnout | | | 43.6% |
| Labour gain from Conservative | | | |
| Labour gain from Conservative | | | |

=== Pitsea East ===
Location of Pitsea East ward

Pitsea East
| Party | Candidate | Votes | % |
|---|---|---|---|
| Labour | L. Hill | 1,198 | 45.7% |
| Conservative | A. Dines | 948 | 36.2% |
| Alliance | P. Cannon | 473 | 18.1% |
| Turnout | | | 33.9% |
| Labour gain from Conservative | | | |

=== Pitsea West ===
Location of Pitsea West ward

Pitsea West
| Party | Candidate | Votes | % |
|---|---|---|---|
| Labour | H. Tinworth | 1,626 | 56.8% |
| Conservative | B. Weedon | 680 | 23.8% |
| SDP | A. Scott | 437 | 15.3% |
| Liberal | D. Richardson | 118 | 4.1% |
| Turnout | | | 32.9% |
| Labour hold | | | |

=== Vange ===
Location of Vange ward

Vange
| Party | Candidate | Votes | % |
|---|---|---|---|
| Labour | M. Miller | 1,382 | 52.5% |
| Conservative | J. Dolby | 650 | 24.7% |
| Alliance | K. Neil | 599 | 22.8% |
| Turnout | | | 34.8% |
| Labour hold | | | |

=== Wickford North ===
Location of Wickford North ward

Wickford North
| Party | Candidate | Votes | % |
|---|---|---|---|
| Conservative | B. Pummell | 1,834 | 54.9% |
| Labour | G. Wright | 764 | 22.9% |
| Alliance | I. Wakefield | 745 | 22.3% |
| Turnout | | | 40.7% |
| Conservative hold | | | |

=== Wickford South ===
Location of Wickford South ward

Wickford South
| Party | Candidate | Votes | % |
|---|---|---|---|
| Alliance | R. Auvray | 1,555 | 45.4% |
| Conservative | T. Taylor | 1,490 | 43.5% |
| Labour | R. Oliver | 381 | 11.1% |
| Turnout | | | 43.3% |
| Alliance gain from Conservative | | | |
