= 2000 Basildon District Council election =

2000 UK local government election

| ← 1999 | 4 May 2000 | 2002 → |

15 of the 42 seats to Basildon District Council 22 seats needed for a majority
| | First party | Second party | Third party |
|---|---|---|---|
| Party | Labour | Conservative | Liberal Democrats |
| Seats before | 23 | 11 | 8 |
| Seats won | 8 | 6 | 1 |
| Seats after | 20 | 18 | 4 |
| Seat change | ▼3 | ▲7 | ▼4 |
| Popular vote | 9,333 | 16,705 | 5,120 |
| Percentage | 29.5% | 52.8% | 16.2% |
- Map showing the results of contested wards in the 2000 Basildon Borough Council elections.
Council control before election
Labour
Council control after election
No overall control

The 2000 Basildon District Council election took place on 4 May 2000 to elect members of Basildon District Council in Essex, England. One third of the council was up for election and the Labour party lost overall control of the council to no overall control.

After the election, the composition of the council was the following:

- Labour 20
- Conservative 18
- Liberal Democrats 4

== Election result ==
The results saw the Conservatives make gains from both Labour and Liberal Democrats to go from 11 to 18 seats on the council. This deprived Labour of a majority on the council after 5 years and reduced Labour's lead over the Conservatives to just 2 seats. Meanwhile, the Liberal Democrats lost half their seats to fall to have just 4 councillors, but were left with the balance of power.

The Conservatives gained marginal seats in Basildon from Labour including Laindon, Langdon Hills and Pitsea East. They also took all the seats the Liberal Democrats had been defending in Billericay and Wickford.

Following the election, the Liberal Democrat leader Geoff Williams said "issues will be decided on their merit and not on party politics".

2000 Basildon local election result
| Party | Seats | Gains | Losses | Net gain/loss | Seats % | Votes % | Votes | +/− |
|---|---|---|---|---|---|---|---|---|
| Conservative | 8 | 6 | 0 | ▲6 | 53.3 | 52.8 | 16,705 | ▲22.5 |
| Labour | 6 | 0 | 3 | ▼3 | 40.0 | 29.5 | 9,333 | ▼16.4 |
| Liberal Democrats | 1 | 0 | 3 | ▼3 | 6.7 | 16.2 | 5,120 | ▼6.7 |
| Independent | 0 | 0 | 0 | Steady | 0.0 | 1.4 | 447 | New |
| Socialist Alternative | 0 | 0 | 0 | Steady | 0.0 | 0.1 | 37 | New |

All comparisons in vote share are to the corresponding 1996 election.

== Ward results ==
=== Billericay East ===
Location of Billericay East ward

Billericay East
| Party | Candidate | Votes | % |
|---|---|---|---|
| Conservative | John Alabaster | 1,675 | 66.3% |
| Liberal Democrats | F. Bellard | 583 | 23.1% |
| Labour | P. Reid | 269 | 10.6% |
| Turnout | | | 28.4% |
| Conservative gain from Liberal Democrats | | | |

=== Billericay West ===
Location of Billericay West ward

Billericay West
| Party | Candidate | Votes | % |
|---|---|---|---|
| Conservative | Anthony Hedley | 2,022 | 66.7% |
| Liberal Democrats | G. Taylor | 800 | 26.4% |
| Labour | L. Howard | 210 | 6.9% |
| Turnout | | | 28.6% |
| Conservative gain from Liberal Democrats | | | |

=== Burstead ===
Location of Burstead ward

Burstead
| Party | Candidate | Votes | % |
|---|---|---|---|
| Conservative | Christopher Jackman | 1,551 | 64.3% |
| Liberal Democrats | G. Bellard | 542 | 22.5% |
| Labour | M. Viney | 319 | 13.2% |
| Turnout | | | 27.9% |
| Conservative hold | | | |

=== Fryerns Central ===
Location of Fryerns Central ward

Fryerns Central
| Party | Candidate | Votes | % |
|---|---|---|---|
| Labour | Julia Palmer | 946 | 53.8% |
| Conservative | W. Marck | 558 | 31.7% |
| Liberal Democrats | S. Dickinson | 255 | 14.5% |
| Turnout | | | 22.4% |
| Labour hold | | | |

=== Fryerns East ===
Location of Fryerns East ward

Fryerns East
| Party | Candidate | Votes | % |
|---|---|---|---|
| Labour | Janet Payn | 737 | |
| Labour | Anthony Borlase | 703 | |
| Conservative | D. Allen | 519 | |
| Conservative | R. Hyland | 410 | |
| Liberal Democrats | J. Lutton | 194 | |
| Turnout | | | 19.2% |
| Labour hold | | | |
| Labour hold | | | |

=== Laindon ===
Location of Laindon ward

Laindon
| Party | Candidate | Votes | % |
|---|---|---|---|
| Labour | Stuart Allen | 1,299 | 48.9% |
| Conservative | W. Aitken | 1,003 | 37.8% |
| Liberal Democrats | V. Howard | 276 | 10.4% |
| Independent | A. Viccary | 76 | 2.9% |
| Turnout | | | 26.7% |
| Conservative gain from Labour | | | |

=== Langdon Hills ===
Location of Langdon Hills ward

Langdon Hills
| Party | Candidate | Votes | % |
|---|---|---|---|
| Conservative | Stephen Hillier | 1,609 | 60.6% |
| Labour | P. Garrad | 725 | 27.3% |
| Liberal Democrats | M. Hersom | 218 | 8.2% |
| Independent | J. Richardson | 67 | 2.5% |
| Socialist Alternative | D. Murray | 37 | 1.4% |
| Turnout | | | 26.8% |
| Conservative gain from Labour | | | |

=== Lee Chapel North ===
Location of Lee Chapel North ward

Lee Chapel North
| Party | Candidate | Votes | % |
|---|---|---|---|
| Labour | D. Keefe | 820 | 45.3% |
| Conservative | S. Cleasby | 632 | 34.9% |
| Liberal Democrats | S. Williams | 171 | 9.4% |
| Independent | S. Chaney | 123 | 6.8% |
| Independent | M. Dale | 64 | 3.5% |
| Turnout | | | 24.3% |
| Labour hold | | | |

=== Nethermayne ===
Location of Nethermayne ward

Nethermayne
| Party | Candidate | Votes | % |
|---|---|---|---|
| Liberal Democrats | Ben Williams | 1,067 | 45.5% |
| Conservative | D. Walsh | 647 | 27.6% |
| Labour | A. Manning | 631 | 26.9% |
| Turnout | | | 34.2% |
| Liberal Democrats hold | | | |

=== Pitsea East ===
Location of Pitsea East ward

Pitsea East
| Party | Candidate | Votes | % |
|---|---|---|---|
| Conservative | Kevin Blake | 1,225 | 51.8% |
| Labour | K. Woods | 1,024 | 43.3% |
| Independent | N. Richardson | 117 | 4.9% |
| Turnout | | | 22.5% |
| Conservative gain from Labour | | | |

=== Pitsea West ===
Location of Pitsea West ward

Pitsea West
| Party | Candidate | Votes | % |
|---|---|---|---|
| Labour | Richard Llewellyn | 919 | 57.6% |
| Conservative | B. Larwood | 677 | 42.4% |
| Turnout | | | 19.7% |
| Labour hold | | | |

=== Vange ===
Location of Vange ward

Vange
| Party | Candidate | Votes | % |
|---|---|---|---|
| Labour | Phil Rackley | 645 | 48.1% |
| Conservative | G. Johnson | 528 | 39.3% |
| Liberal Democrats | L. Williams | 169 | 12.6% |
| Turnout | | | 17.3% |
| Labour hold | | | |

=== Wickford North ===
Location of Wickford North ward

Wickford North
| Party | Candidate | Votes | % |
|---|---|---|---|
| Conservative | Carole Morris | 1,669 | 64.1% |
| Labour | C. Wilson | 515 | 19.8% |
| Liberal Democrats | I. Robertson | 419 | 16.1% |
| Turnout | | | 28.1% |
| Conservative gain from Liberal Democrats | | | |

=== Wickford South ===
Location of Wickford South ward

Wickford South
| Party | Candidate | Votes | % |
|---|---|---|---|
| Conservative | Malcolm Buckley | 2,094 | 67.8% |
| Labour | A. Ede | 570 | 18.4% |
| Liberal Democrats | W. Fane | 426 | 13.8% |
| Turnout | | | 25.5% |
| Conservative hold | | | |
