= 1991 Basildon District Council election =

1991 UK local government election

← 1990	2 May 1991	1992 →

15 of the 42 seats to Basildon District Council 22 seats needed for a majority
	First party	Second party	Third party
Party	Labour	Conservative	Liberal Democrats
Seats before	23	14	5
Seats won	6	7	2
Seats after	21	17	4
Seat change	▼2	▲3	▼1
Popular vote	16,532	24,678	13,867
Percentage	30.0%	44.8%	25.2%
- Map showing the results of contested wards in the 1991 Basildon Borough Council elections.
Council control before election
Labour Party
Council control after election
No overall control

The 1991 Basildon District Council election took place on 2 May 1991 to elect members of Basildon District Council in Essex, England. This was on the same day as other local elections. One third of the council was up for election; the seats which were last contested in 1987. An addition seat was up for election in Fryerns Central ward. The Labour Party lost control of the council, which it had gained only the previous year; the council fell back under no overall control.

== Overall results ==
1991 Basildon District Council Election
Party	Seats	Gains	Losses	Net gain/loss	Seats %	Votes %	Votes	+/−
Conservative	7	3	0	▲3	46.7	44.8	24,678	▲8.5
Labour	6	0	1	▼1	40.0	30.0	16,532	▼2.5
Liberal Democrats	2	0	2	▼2	13.3	25.2	13,867	▼5.8
Total	15						55,077	

All comparisons in vote share are to the corresponding 1987 election.

== Ward results ==
=== Billericay East ===
Location of Billericay East ward

Billericay East
Party	Candidate	Votes	%
Conservative	B. Lea	2,390	61.9%
Liberal Democrats	A. Ferriss	908	23.5%
Labour	E. Harrison	564	14.6%
Turnout			45.8%
Conservative hold			

=== Billericay West ===
Location of Billericay West ward

Billericay West
Party	Candidate	Votes	%
Conservative	F. Tomlin	2,901	67.8%
Liberal Democrats	P. Johnson	945	22.1%
Labour	V. Walker	435	10.2%
Turnout			45.6%
Conservative hold			

=== Burstead ===
Location of Burstead ward

Burstead
Party	Candidate	Votes	%
Conservative	G. Buckenham	2,099	49.8%
Liberal Democrats	G. Taylor	1,755	41.6%
Labour	M. Viney	365	8.7%
Turnout			51.2%
Conservative hold			

=== Fryerns Central (2 seats) ===
Location of Fryerns Central ward

Fryerns Central (2)
Party	Candidate	Votes	%
Labour	P. Ballard	1,779	
Labour	J. Orpe	1,506	
Liberal Democrats	J. Smith	1,064	
Liberal Democrats	B. Wakeham	996	
Conservative	S. Allen	805	
Conservative	D. Allen	802	
Turnout			44.7%
Labour hold			
Labour hold			

=== Fryerns East ===
Location of Fryerns East ward

Fryerns East
Party	Candidate	Votes	%
Labour	A. Dove	1,602	48.7%
Liberal Democrats	J. Lutton	875	26.6%
Conservative	K. Boucher	811	24.7%
Turnout			40.5%
Labour hold			

=== Laindon ===
Location of Laindon ward

Laindon
Party	Candidate	Votes	%
Conservative	V. York	2,323	53.3%
Labour	J. Field	1,498	34.4%
Liberal Democrats	M. Martin	535	12.3%
Turnout			49.3%
Conservative hold			

=== Langdon Hills ===
Location of Langdon Hills ward

Langdon Hills
Party	Candidate	Votes	%
Conservative	Mark Francois	2,550	54.6%
Labour	P. Kirkman	1,658	35.5%
Liberal Democrats	C. Jones	459	9.8%
Turnout			52.0%
Conservative gain from Liberal Democrats			

=== Lee Chapel North ===
Location of Lee Chapel North ward

Lee Chapel North
Party	Candidate	Votes	%
Labour	J. Costello	1,794	51.5%
Conservative	T. Fleet	1,221	35.0%
Liberal Democrats	T. Low	471	13.5%
Turnout			45.1%
Labour hold			

=== Nethermayne ===
Location of Nethermayne ward

Nethermayne
Party	Candidate	Votes	%
Liberal Democrats	J. White	1,698	41.1%
Conservative	S. Blackbourn	1,294	31.3%
Labour	H. Bruce	1,140	27.6%
Turnout			56.3%
Liberal Democrats hold			

=== Pitsea East ===
Location of Pitsea East ward

Pitsea East
Party	Candidate	Votes	%
Conservative	R. Sheridan	2,016	48.7%
Labour	R. Llewellyn	1,633	39.5%
Liberal Democrats	L. Williams	488	11.8%
Turnout			38.8%
Conservative gain from Labour			

=== Pitsea West ===
Location of Pitsea West ward

Pitsea West
Party	Candidate	Votes	%
Labour	J. Beaumont	1,654	52.0%
Conservative	C. Coombes	1,080	33.9%
Liberal Democrats	B. Mavis	449	14.1%
Turnout			36.0%
Labour hold			

=== Vange ===
Location of Vange ward

Vange
Party	Candidate	Votes	%
Labour	M. Bruce	1,450	51.5%
Conservative	R. Cole	918	32.6%
Liberal Democrats	J. Campbell	446	15.8%
Turnout			35.9%
Labour hold			

=== Wickford North ===
Location of Wickford North ward

Wickford North
Party	Candidate	Votes	%
Conservative	A. Sharp	2,254	50.0%
Liberal Democrats	R. Allen	1,690	37.5%
Labour	H. Witzer	561	12.5%
Turnout			49.7%
Conservative gain from Liberal Democrats			

=== Wickford South ===
Location of Wickford South ward

Wickford South
Party	Candidate	Votes	%
Liberal Democrats	A. Banton	2,084	46.3%
Conservative	D. Harrison	2,016	44.8%
Labour	A. Witzer	399	8.9%
Turnout			50.3%
Liberal Democrats hold			
