= 1986 Basildon District Council election =

1986 UK local government election

| ← 1984 | 8 May 1986 | 1987 → |

16 of the 42 seats to Basildon District Council 22 seats needed for a majority
| | First party | Second party | Third party |
|---|---|---|---|
| Party | Labour | Conservative | Alliance |
| Seats before | 24 | 15 | 3 |
| Seats won | 7 | 5 | 4 |
| Seats after | 22 | 13 | 7 |
| Seat change | ▼2 | ▼2 | ▲4 |
| Popular vote | 18,751 | 14,933 | 14,070 |
| Percentage | 39.3% | 31.3% | 29.5% |
- Map showing the results of contested wards in the 1986 Basildon Borough Council elections.
Council control before election
Labour Party
Council control after election
Labour Party

The 1986 Basildon District Council election took place on 8 May 1986 to elect members of Basildon District Council in Essex, England. This was on the same day as other local elections. One third of the council was up for election; the seats which were last contested in 1982. The Labour Party retained control of the council, which it had held since 1982.

== Overall results ==
1986 Basildon District Council Election
| Party | Seats | Gains | Losses | Net gain/loss | Seats % | Votes % | Votes | +/− |
|---|---|---|---|---|---|---|---|---|
| Labour | 7 | 1 | 1 | Steady | 43.8 | 39.3 | 18,751 | ▲7.0 |
| Conservative | 5 | 0 | 2 | ▼2 | 31.3 | 31.3 | 14,933 | ▼3.7 |
| Alliance | 4 | 2 | 0 | ▲2 | 25.0 | 29.5 | 14,070 | ▲5.3 |
| Total | 14 | | | | | | 47,754 | |

All comparisons in vote share are to the corresponding 1982 election.

== Ward results ==
=== Billericay East ===
Location of Billericay East ward

Billericay East
| Party | Candidate | Votes | % |
|---|---|---|---|
| Conservative | A. Archer | 1,936 | 54.6% |
| Alliance | K. Jessop | 1,015 | 28.6 |
| Labour | I. Harlow | 592 | 16.7% |
| Turnout | | | 41.3% |
| Conservative hold | | | |

=== Billericay West (3 seats) ===
Location of Billericay West ward

Billericay West (3)
| Party | Candidate | Votes | % |
|---|---|---|---|
| Conservative | G. Dighton | 2,347 | |
| Conservative | C. Lees | 2,340 | |
| Conservative | F. Tomlin | 2,302 | |
| Alliance | J. Morley | 1,128 | |
| Alliance | G. Taylor | 1,103 | |
| Alliance | A. Banton | 1,020 | |
| Labour | M. Baker | 366 | |
| Labour | J. Orpe | 304 | |
| Labour | S. Caira | 301 | |
| Turnout | | | 44.3% |
| Conservative hold | | | |
| Conservative hold | | | |
| Conservative hold | | | |

=== Burstead ===
Location of Burstead ward

Burstead
| Party | Candidate | Votes | % |
|---|---|---|---|
| Conservative | T. Leask | 1,912 | 48.9% |
| Alliance | G. Bellard | 1,422 | 36.3% |
| Labour | J. Kemp | 579 | 14.8% |
| Turnout | | | 46.1% |
| Conservative hold | | | |

=== Fryerns Central ===
Location of Fryerns Central ward

Fryerns Central
| Party | Candidate | Votes | % |
|---|---|---|---|
| Labour | M. Cregg | 2,112 | 65.7% |
| Alliance | J. White | 590 | 18.3% |
| Conservative | R. Sheridan | 514 | 16.0% |
| Turnout | | | 36.4% |
| Labour hold | | | |

=== Fryerns East ===
Location of Fryerns East ward

Fryerns East
| Party | Candidate | Votes | % |
|---|---|---|---|
| Labour | J. Potter | 1,815 | 62.3% |
| Alliance | J. Lutton | 667 | 22.9% |
| Conservative | A. Elliott | 431 | 14.8% |
| Turnout | | | 34.8% |
| Labour hold | | | |

=== Laindon ===
Location of Laindon ward

Laindon
| Party | Candidate | Votes | % |
|---|---|---|---|
| Labour | D. Saxby | 1,823 | 47.2% |
| Conservative | V. York | 1,515 | 39.2% |
| Alliance | J. Smith | 523 | 13.5% |
| Turnout | | | 45.2% |
| Labour gain from Conservative | | | |

=== Langdon Hills ===
Location of Langdon Hills ward

Langdon Hills
| Party | Candidate | Votes | % |
|---|---|---|---|
| Alliance | K. Lack | 1,500 | 50.4% |
| Labour | L. Webb | 991 | 33.3% |
| Conservative | H. Tucker | 488 | 16.4% |
| Turnout | | | 39.1% |
| Alliance hold | | | |

=== Lee Chapel North ===
Location of Lee Chapel North ward

+

Lee Chapel North
| Party | Candidate | Votes | % |
|---|---|---|---|
| Labour | P. Moloney | 1,797 | 61.8% |
| Alliance | P. Edgell | 578 | 19.9% |
| Conservative | I. Harbott | 535 | 18.4% |
| Turnout | | | 36.7% |
| Labour hold | | | |

=== Nethermayne ===
Location of Nethermayne ward

Nethermayne
| Party | Candidate | Votes | % |
|---|---|---|---|
| Alliance | G. Williams | 1,851 | 44.9% |
| Labour | M. Bruce | 1,527 | 37.1% |
| Conservative | E. Dines | 742 | 18.0% |
| Turnout | | | 52.8% |
| Alliance gain from Labour | | | |

=== Pitsea East ===
Location of Pitsea East ward

Pitsea East
| Party | Candidate | Votes | % |
|---|---|---|---|
| Labour | R. Fallon | 1,815 | 57.4% |
| Conservative | D. Osborne | 941 | 29.8% |
| Alliance | L. Williams | 406 | 12.8% |
| Turnout | | | 33.8% |
| Labour hold | | | |

=== Pitsea West ===
Location of Pitsea West ward

Pitsea West
| Party | Candidate | Votes | % |
|---|---|---|---|
| Labour | H. Tinworth | 2,222 | 69.9% |
| Conservative | B. Weedon | 584 | 18.4% |
| Alliance | D. Richardson | 375 | 11.8% |
| Turnout | | | 35.9% |
| Labour hold | | | |

=== Vange ===
Location of Vange ward

Vange
| Party | Candidate | Votes | % |
|---|---|---|---|
| Labour | J. Payn | 1,726 | 69.2% |
| Conservative | J. Dolby | 511 | 20.5% |
| Alliance | G. Singh | 258 | 10.3% |
| Turnout | | | 32.0% |
| Labour hold | | | |

=== Wickford North ===
Location of Wickford North ward

Wickford North
| Party | Candidate | Votes | % |
|---|---|---|---|
| Alliance | M. Birch | 1,613 | 41.0% |
| Conservative | B. Pummell | 1,451 | 36.9% |
| Labour | C. Wilson | 870 | 22.1% |
| Turnout | | | 47.6% |
| Alliance gain from Conservative | | | |

=== Wickford South ===
Location of Wickford South ward

Wickford South
| Party | Candidate | Votes | % |
|---|---|---|---|
| Alliance | F. Bellard | 2,144 | 58.2% |
| Conservative | J. Whellem | 1,026 | 27.8% |
| Labour | L. Martin | 516 | 14.0% |
| Turnout | | | 42.5% |
| Alliance hold | | | |
