= 2002 Basildon District Council election =

2002 UK local government election

← 2000	2 May 2002	2003 →

All 42 seats to Basildon District Council 22 seats needed for a majority
	First party	Second party	Third party
Party	Conservative	Labour	Liberal Democrats
Last election	18	20	4
Seats before	19	19	4
Seats won	21	18	3
Seat change	▲2	▼1	▼1
Popular vote	15,891	11,374	5,833
Percentage	46.8%	33.5%	17.2%
- Map of the results of the 2002 Basildon council election. Conservatives in blue, Labour in red and Liberal Democrats in yellow.
Council control before election
No overall control
Council control after election
No overall control

The 2002 Basildon District Council election took place on 2 May 2002 to elect members of Basildon District Council in Essex, England. The whole council was up for election with boundary changes since the last election in 2000. The council stayed under no overall control.

== Background ==
A review of the boundaries on Basildon council made changes for this election leading to the whole council being elected. Several new wards were created for the election including Crouch, Pitsea South East and St Martin's.

Before the election both the Labour and Conservative parties had 19 seats, while the Liberal Democrats had 4 seats and Labour led a minority administration. Several councillors stood down at the election including the Labour leader of the council John Potter. Candidates standing in the election included the first member of the British National Party to do so, Matthew Single in Vange ward.

== Election results ==
The results saw the Conservatives become the largest party on the council with 21 seats, but fail to win a majority. They gained 1 seat each from Labour and the Liberal Democrats, who were left with 18 and 3 seats respectively. However the expectation was that an alliance between Labour and the Liberal Democrats would continue to run the council as the outgoing Labour chairman could use his casting vote to keep Labour in power. Meanwhile, the British National Party failed to win a seat after coming fifth in Vange ward.

Following the election the alliance between Labour and the Liberal Democrats was confirmed in control of the council, with Labour councillor Nigel Smith, husband of member of parliament for Basildon Angela Smith, becoming the new leader of the council.

2002 Basildon local election result
Party	Seats	Gains	Losses	Net gain/loss	Seats %	Votes %	Votes	+/−
Conservative	21			▲2	50.0	48.0	41,157	
Labour	18			▼1	42.9	34.4	29,475	
Liberal Democrats	3			▼1	7.1	16.6	14,251	
Independent	0			Steady	0.0	0.7	599	
BNP	0			Steady	0.0	0.2	189	
Socialist Alliance	0			Steady	0.0	0.1	93	

== Ward results ==
=== Billericay East ===
Location of Billericay East ward

Billericay East (3)
Party	Candidate	Votes	%
Conservative	Anthony Archer	1,786	22.0
Conservative	Stuart Sullivan	1,745	21.5
Conservative	David Dadds	1,702	21.0
Liberal Democrats	Gilda Bellard	623	7.7
Liberal Democrats	Dorothy Edwards	597	7.4
Liberal Democrats	John James	573	7.1
Labour	Anthony Bennett	387	4.8
Labour	Conor O'Brien	363	4.5
Labour	Kevin Wood	341	4.2
Turnout		8,117	

=== Billericay West ===
Location of Billericay West ward

Billericay West (3)
Party	Candidate	Votes	%
Conservative	Anthony Hedley	1,965	25.1
Conservative	Philip Turner	1,869	23.8
Conservative	Stephen Horgan	1,844	23.5
Liberal Democrats	Francis Bellard	556	7.1
Liberal Democrats	Craig Hands	496	6.3
Liberal Democrats	Jonathan Myall	373	4.8
Labour	Aidan McGurran	253	3.2
Labour	Fiona Smith	253	3.2
Labour	Mohamed Javed	229	2.9
Turnout		7,838	

=== Burstead ===
Location of Burstead ward

Burstead (3)
Party	Candidate	Votes	%
Conservative	Geoffrey Buckenham	1,627	20.9
Conservative	Desmond Lake	1,521	19.6
Conservative	Kevin Blake	1,469	18.9
Liberal Democrats	Belinda Jackson	779	10.0
Liberal Democrats	James Edwards	762	9.8
Liberal Democrats	Geoffrey Taylor	757	9.7
Labour	Margaret Mary	294	3.8
Labour	Viney Reid	286	3.7
Labour	Patricia Reid	272	3.5
Turnout		7,767	

=== Crouch ===
Location of Crouch ward

Crouch (2)
Party	Candidate	Votes	%
Conservative	Terri Sargent	1,073	34.9
Conservative	Stuart Allen	1,023	33.3
Labour	Wendy Aitken	406	13.2
Labour	Eva Borlase	322	10.5
Liberal Democrats	Arthur Ferriss	248	8.1
Turnout		3,072	

=== Fryerns ===
Location of Fryerns ward

Fryerns (3)
Party	Candidate	Votes	%
Labour	Janet Payn	1,470	22.1
Labour	Paul Kirkman	1,452	21.8
Labour	Julia Woods	1,344	20.2
Conservative	Deborah Allen	596	9.0
Conservative	Kenneth Evens	560	8.4
Conservative	Harold Liebner	501	7.5
Liberal Democrats	John Lutton	279	4.2
Liberal Democrats	Stephen Nice	224	3.4
Liberal Democrats	Tracey Williams	222	3.3
Turnout		6,648	

=== Laindon Park ===
Location of Laindon Park ward

Laindon Park (3)
Party	Candidate	Votes	%
Labour	Barbara Croft	1,148	20.6
Labour	William Archibald	1,077	19.3
Labour	Anthony Borlase	1,006	18.1
Conservative	John Schofield	766	13.8
Conservative	Stephen Hills	715	12.8
Conservative	Francis Tomlin	691	12.2
Independent	Alfred Viccary	165	3.0
Turnout		5,568	

=== Langdon Hills ===
Location of Langdon Hills ward

Langdon Hills (2)
Party	Candidate	Votes	%
Conservative	Sandra Hillier	923	27.2
Conservative	Stephen Hillier	871	25.7
Independent	Derrick Fellowes	434	12.8
Labour	Lynda Gordon	392	11.6
Labour	Emily Evans	363	10.7
Liberal Democrats	Linda Williams	239	7.0
Liberal Democrats	Susan Dickinson	171	5.0
Turnout		3,393	

=== Lee Chapel North ===
Lee Chapel North ward in Basildon 2002

Lee Chapel North (3)
Party	Candidate	Votes	%
Labour	Nigel Smith	1,165	20.3
Labour	Maureen Larkin	1,159	20.2
Labour	Richard Rackham	1,086	18.9
Conservative	Sharon Cleasby	530	9.2
Conservative	Richard Hyland	518	9.0
Conservative	Sharon Reid	515	9.0
Liberal Democrats	Linda Martin	241	4.2
Liberal Democrats	Michael James	229	4.0
Liberal Democrats	Martin Neale	214	3.7
Socialist Alliance	Richard Duane	93	1.6
Turnout		5,750	

=== Nethermayne ===
Location of Nethermayne ward

Nethermayne (3)
Party	Candidate	Votes	%
Liberal Democrats	Geoffrey Williams	1,268	15.1
Liberal Democrats	Joseph White	1,245	14.9
Liberal Democrats	Benjamin Williams	1,199	14.2
Labour	Michael Plant	945	11.3
Labour	Andrew Manning	930	11.1
Labour	Peter Wedlock	841	10.0
Conservative	Henry Tucker	676	8.1
Conservative	David Walsh	642	7.7
Conservative	Christine Walsh	636	7.6
Turnout		8,382	

=== Pitsea North West ===
Location of Pitsea North West ward

Pitsea North West (3)
Party	Candidate	Votes	%
Labour	Keith Bobbin	997	21.2
Labour	Allan Davies	893	19.0
Labour	Philip Rackley	856	18.2
Conservative	Roy Clarke	543	11.5
Conservative	Mark Levey	491	10.4
Conservative	Roy Watkinson	456	9.7
Liberal Democrats	Martin Howard	238	5.1
Liberal Democrats	Vivien Howard	229	4.9
Turnout		4,703	

=== Pitsea South East ===
Location of Pitsea South East ward

Pitsea South East (3)
Party	Candidate	Votes	%
Labour	Patrick Evans	1,142	18.2
Conservative	Jacqueline Blake	1,120	17.8
Labour	Dean Golding	1,077	17.2
Conservative	Malcolm Geddes	1,001	15.9
Conservative	Edward Phelan	995	15.8
Labour	Andrew Powderly	944	15.0
Turnout		6,279	

=== St Martin's ===
Location of St Martin's ward

St Martin's (2)
Party	Candidate	Votes	%
Labour	Richard Llewellyn	771	30.4
Labour	Colin Payn	758	29.8
Conservative	Gwen Ball	329	13.0
Conservative	Carol Mowe	278	10.9
Liberal Democrats	Michael Dickinson	213	8.4
Liberal Democrats	Annie Humphries	191	7.5
Turnout		2,540	

=== Vange ===
Location of Vange ward

Vange (2)
Party	Candidate	Votes	%
Labour	David Abrahall	772	28.0
Labour	Swatantra Nandanwar	665	24.1
Conservative	Garry Johnson	403	14.6
Conservative	Philip Johnson	380	13.8
BNP	Matthew Single	189	6.9
Liberal Democrats	Peter Hulse	178	6.5
Liberal Democrats	Seth Williams	167	6.1
Turnout		2,754	

=== Wickford Castledon ===
Location of Wickford Castleton ward

Wickford Castledon (2)
Party	Candidate	Votes	%
Conservative	Malcolm Buckley	1,165	33.4
Conservative	Sylvia Buckley	1,099	31.5
Labour	Derek Burn	356	10.2
Labour	Albert Ede	316	9.0
Liberal Democrats	Kenneth Ward	309	8.8
Liberal Democrats	Arnald Thorpe	248	7.1
Turnout		3,493	

=== Wickford North ===
Location of Wickford North ward

Wickford North (3)
Party	Candidate	Votes	%
Conservative	Anthony Ball	1,658	22.9
Conservative	Carole Morris	1,562	21.6
Conservative	Michael Mowe	1,522	21.0
Labour	Jacqueline Brown	639	8.8
Labour	Christopher Wilson	543	7.5
Labour	Linda Howard	489	6.8
Liberal Democrats	Michael Maguire	454	6.3
Liberal Democrats	Ian Robertson	368	5.1
Turnout		7,235	

=== Wickford Park ===
Location of Wickford Park ward

Wickford Park (2)
Party	Candidate	Votes	%
Conservative	Donald Morris	731	32.9
Conservative	Christopher Jackman	660	29.7
Labour	Leroy Stephenson	237	10.7
Labour	Clive Thomas	236	10.6
Liberal Democrats	Michael Woods	208	9.3
Liberal Democrats	Fane Cummings	153	6.9
Turnout		2,225	
