= 1987 Basildon District Council election =

1987 UK local government election

← 1986	7 May 1987	1988 →

14 of the 42 seats to Basildon District Council 22 seats needed for a majority
	First party	Second party	Third party
Party	Labour	Conservative	Alliance
Seats before	22	13	7
Seats won	6	4	4
Seats after	20	11	11
Seat change	▼2	▼2	▲4
Popular vote	17,983	20,221	17,188
Percentage	32.5%	36.5%	31.0%
- Map showing the results of contested wards in the 1987 Basildon Borough Council elections.
Council control before election
Labour Party
Council control after election
No overall control

The 1987 Basildon District Council election took place on 7 May 1987 to elect members of Basildon District Council in Essex, England. This was on the same day as other local elections. One third of the council was up for election; the seats which were last contested in 1983. The Labour Party lost control of the council, which it had held since 1982; the council fell under no overall control.

== Overall results ==
1987 Basildon District Council Election
Party	Seats	Gains	Losses	Net gain/loss	Seats %	Votes %	Votes	+/−
Labour	6	0	2	▼2	42.9	32.5	17,983	▼4.2
Conservative	4	0	2	▼2	28.6	36.5	20,221	▼3.5
Alliance	4	4	0	▲4	28.6	31.0	17,188	▲8.0
Total	14						55,392	

All comparisons in vote share are to the corresponding 1983 election.

== Ward results ==
=== Billericay East ===
Location of Billericay East ward

Billericay East
Party	Candidate	Votes	%
Conservative	B. Lea	2,458	58.0%
Alliance	S. Moore	1,255	29.6%
Labour	A. Knight	525	12.4%
Turnout			48.4%
Conservative hold			

=== Billericay West ===
Location of Billericay West ward

Billericay West
Party	Candidate	Votes	%
Conservative	F. Tomlin	2,960	64.5%
Alliance	J. Morley	1,292	28.2%
Labour	J. Orpe	336	7.3%
Turnout			50.6%
Conservative hold			

=== Burstead ===
Location of Burstead ward

Burstead
Party	Candidate	Votes	%
Conservative	S. Dines	2,353	50.1%
Alliance	G. Bellard	1,944	41.4%
Labour	J. Kemp	397	8.5%
Turnout			55.4%
Conservative hold			

=== Fryerns Central ===
Location of Fryerns Central ward

Fryerns Central
Party	Candidate	Votes	%
Labour	P. Ballard	2,108	58.6%
Alliance	G. Humfrey	778	21.6%
Conservative	A. Elliott	714	19.8%
Turnout			42.0%
Labour hold			

=== Fryerns East ===
Location of Fryerns East ward

Fryerns East
Party	Candidate	Votes	%
Labour	A. Dove	1,850	51.2%
Alliance	J. Lutton	1,076	29.8%
Conservative	R. Sheridan	688	19.0%
Turnout			42.8%
Labour hold			

=== Laindon ===
Location of Laindon ward

Laindon
Party	Candidate	Votes	%
Conservative	V. York	2,009	45.4%
Labour	D. Roe	1,835	41.5%
Alliance	S. Furlong	579	13.1%
Turnout			50.8%
Conservative hold			

=== Langdon Hills ===
Location of Langdon Hills ward

Langdon Hills
Party	Candidate	Votes	%
Alliance	K. Neil	1,555	46.7%
Labour	M. Baker	949	28.5%
Conservative	B. Weedon	825	24.8%
Turnout			42.5%
Alliance gain from Labour			

=== Lee Chapel North ===
Location of Lee Chapel North ward

Lee Chapel North
Party	Candidate	Votes	%
Labour	J. Costello	1,856	52.6%
Alliance	S. Saunders	941	26.6%
Conservative	H. Tucker	734	20.8%
Turnout			44.7%
Labour hold			

=== Nethermayne ===
Location of Nethermayne ward

Nethermayne
Party	Candidate	Votes	%
Alliance	J. White	1,963	42.9%
Labour	E. Gelder	1,498	32.7%
Conservative	P. Hedges	1,114	24.3%
Turnout			58.8%
Alliance gain from Labour			

=== Pitsea East ===
Location of Pitsea East ward

Pitsea East
Party	Candidate	Votes	%
Labour	L. Webb	1,801	47.4%
Conservative	T. Hall	1,274	33.5%
Alliance	B. Jeffery	728	19.1%
Turnout			37.6%
Labour hold			

=== Pitsea West ===
Location of Pitsea West ward

Pitsea West
Party	Candidate	Votes	%
Labour	J. Amey	2,026	59.9%
Conservative	W. Lockhart	853	25.2%
Alliance	D. Richardson	506	14.9%
Turnout			37.8%
Labour hold			

=== Vange ===
Location of Vange ward

Vange
Party	Candidate	Votes	%
Labour	G. Miller	1,567	55.1%
Conservative	J. Dolby	817	28.7%
Alliance	B. Wakeham	461	16.2%
Turnout			35.9%
Labour hold			

=== Wickford North ===
Location of Wickford North ward

Wickford North
Party	Candidate	Votes	%
Alliance	L. Banton	2,022	44.1%
Conservative	B. Pummell	1,869	40.7%
Labour	C. Wilson	699	15.2%
Turnout			54.2%
Alliance gain from Conservative			

=== Wickford South ===
Location of Wickford South ward

Wickford South
Party	Candidate	Votes	%
Alliance	A. Banton	2,088	50.0%
Conservative	C. Ball	1,553	37.2%
Labour	E. Harrison	536	12.8%
Turnout			45.9%
Alliance gain from Conservative			
