= 1990 Basildon District Council election =

1990 UK local government election

- 3 May 1990

14 of the 42 seats to Basildon District Council 22 seats needed for a majority
	First party	Second party	Third party
Party	Labour	Conservative	Liberal Democrats
Seats before	20	13	9
Seats won	8	5	1
Seats after	23	14	5
Seat change	▲3	▲1	▼4
Popular vote	22,637	22,907	11,912
Percentage	38.3%	38.8%	20.2%
- Map showing the results of contested wards in the 1990 Basildon Borough Council elections.
Council control before election
No overall control
Council control after election
Labour Party

The 1990 Basildon District Council election took place on 3 May 1990 to elect members of Basildon District Council in Essex, England. This was on the same day as other local elections. One third of the council was up for election; the seats which were last contested in 1986. The Labour Party gained control of the council, which had been under no overall control since 1987.

== Overall results ==
1990 Basildon District Council Election
Party	Seats	Gains	Losses	Net gain/loss	Seats %	Votes %	Votes	+/−
Labour	8	1	0	▲1	57.1	38.3	22,637	▼1.0
Conservative	5	2	0	▲2	35.7	38.8	22,907	▲7.5
Liberal Democrats	1	0	3	▼3	7.1	20.2	11,912	▼9.3
Green	0	0	0	Steady	0.0	2.7	1,589	New
Total	14						59,045	

All comparisons in vote share are to the corresponding 1986 election.

== Ward results ==
=== Billericay East ===
Location of Billericay East ward

Billericay East
Party	Candidate	Votes	%
Conservative	A. Archer	2,629	61.2%
Liberal Democrats	A. Ferriss	844	19.6%
Labour	J. Orpe	826	19.2%
Turnout			50.4%
Conservative hold			

=== Billericay West ===
Location of Billericay West ward

Billericay West
Party	Candidate	Votes	%
Conservative	F. Ferguson	2,835	63.7%
Liberal Democrats	P. Johnson	767	17.2%
Labour	A. Final	568	12.8%
Green	M. O'Regan	282	6.3%
Turnout			47.7%
Conservative hold			

=== Burstead ===
Location of Burstead ward

Burstead
Party	Candidate	Votes	%
Conservative	T. Leask	2,260	50.6%
Liberal Democrats	G. Taylor	1,660	37.2%
Labour	I. Harlow	548	12.3%
Turnout			53.9%
Conservative hold			

=== Fryerns Central ===
Location of Fryerns Central ward

Fryerns Central
Party	Candidate	Votes	%
Labour	M. Cregg	2,478	61.4%
Conservative	S. Allen	886	22.0%
Liberal Democrats	J. Smith	525	13.0%
Green	F. Benwell	147	3.6%
Turnout			47.0%
Labour hold			

=== Fryerns East ===
Location of Fryerns East ward

Fryerns East
Party	Candidate	Votes	%
Labour	J. Potter	2,156	59.3%
Liberal Democrats	J. Lutton	767	21.1%
Conservative	K. Boucher	712	19.6%
Turnout			43.8%
Labour hold			

=== Laindon ===
Location of Laindon ward

Laindon
Party	Candidate	Votes	%
Labour	D. Keeffe	1,978	44.8%
Conservative	W. Lockhart	1,906	43.2%
Liberal Democrats	M. Martin	531	12.0%
Turnout			50.4%
Labour hold			

=== Langdon Hills ===
Location of Langdon Hills ward

Langdon Hills
Party	Candidate	Votes	%
Labour	C. Webb	2,051	45.6%
Conservative	Mark Francois	1,973	43.8%
Liberal Democrats	I. White	289	6.4%
Green	A. Macdougall	188	4.2%
Turnout			49.9%
Labour gain from Liberal Democrats			

=== Lee Chapel North ===
Location of Lee Chapel North ward

Lee Chapel North
Party	Candidate	Votes	%
Labour	R. Austin	2,379	60.4%
Conservative	T. Fleet	1,043	26.5%
Liberal Democrats	P. Jenkins	327	8.3%
Green	M. Thomas	189	4.8%
Turnout			49.7%
Labour hold			

=== Nethermayne ===
Location of Nethermayne ward

Nethermayne
Party	Candidate	Votes	%
Liberal Democrats	G. Williams	1,655	36.3%
Labour	M. Bruce	1,547	34.0%
Conservative	V. Robbins	1,354	29.7%
Turnout			61.8%
Liberal Democrats hold			

=== Pitsea East ===
Location of Pitsea East ward

Pitsea East
Party	Candidate	Votes	%
Labour	R. Fallon	2,177	52.7%
Conservative	P. Cleland	1,413	34.2%
Green	L. Davies	274	6.6%
Liberal Democrats	L. Williams	269	6.5%
Turnout			38.9%
Labour hold			

=== Pitsea West ===
Location of Pitsea West ward

Pitsea West
Party	Candidate	Votes	%
Labour	J. Carty	2,422	63.8%
Conservative	P. Cleland	923	24.3%
Liberal Democrats	B. Mavis	300	7.9%
Green	T. Davies	153	4.0%
Turnout			42.3%
Labour hold			

=== Vange ===
Location of Vange ward

Vange
Party	Candidate	Votes	%
Labour	J. Payn	1,869	59.8%
Conservative	R. Cole	827	26.5%
Liberal Democrats	B. Wakeham	247	7.9%
Green	M. Benwell	181	5.8%
Turnout			39.0%
Labour hold			

=== Wickford North ===
Location of Wickford North ward

Wickford North
Party	Candidate	Votes	%
Conservative	S. Buckley	2,091	43.0%
Liberal Democrats	M. Birch	1,853	38.1%
Labour	S. Harness	922	18.9%
Turnout			53.0%
Conservative gain from Liberal Democrats			

=== Wickford South ===
Location of Wickford South ward

Wickford South
Party	Candidate	Votes	%
Conservative	D. Morris	2,055	42.6%
Liberal Democrats	F. Bellard	1,878	38.9%
Labour	E. Harrison	716	14.8%
Green	G. Collins	175	3.6%
Turnout			52.8%
Conservative gain from Liberal Democrats			
