= 1979 Basildon District Council election =

1979 UK local government election

← 1976	3 May 1979	1980 →

All 42 seats to Basildon District Council 22 seats needed for a majority
	First party	Second party	Third party
Party	Labour	Conservative	Residents
Last election	23	17	6
Seats won	17	16	9
Seat change	▼6	▼1	▲3
Popular vote	28,779	33,494	9,700
Percentage	35.4%	41.2%	11.9%
- Map showing the results of contested wards in the 1979 Basildon Borough Council elections.
Council control before election
No overall control
Council control after election
No overall control

The 1979 Basildon District Council election took place on 3 May 1979 to elect members of Basildon District Council in Essex, England. This was on the same day as other local elections. It was the first election to be held on new ward boundaries. The council remained under no overall control.

== Overall results ==
1979 Basildon District Council Election
Party	Seats	Gains	Losses	Net gain/loss	Seats %	Votes %	Votes	+/−
Labour	17			▼6	40.5	35.4	28,779	▼1.1
Conservative	16			▼1	38.1	41.2	33,494	▼4.5
Residents	9			▲3	22.5	11.9	9,700	▼2.3
Liberal	0			Steady	0.0	11.4	9,248	▲9.6
Total	42						81,221	

== Ward results ==
=== Billericay East (3 seats) ===
Location of Billericay East ward

Billericay East (3)
Party	Candidate	Votes	%
Residents	R. Harness	3,099	
Residents	S. Wallis	3,064	
Residents	M. White	3,023	
Conservative	A. Archer	2,733	
Conservative	R. Marshall	2,671	
Conservative	E. Guy	2,669	
Labour	I. Moul	787	
Labour	C. Caine	753	
Labour	G. Brooke	713	
Turnout			85.1%
Residents win (new seat)			
Residents win (new seat)			
Residents win (new seat)			

=== Billericay West (3 seats) ===
Location of Billericay West ward

Billericay West (3)
Party	Candidate	Votes	%
Residents	A. Greaves	3,277	
Residents	A. Evans	3,265	
Residents	H. Wilkins	3,154	
Conservative	G. Copley	1,878	
Conservative	D. Almond	1,865	
Conservative	W. Lea	1,693	
Labour	E. Greenhow	270	
Labour	S. Townsend	258	
Labour	R. Waters	215	
Turnout			85.4%
Residents win (new seat)			
Residents win (new seat)			
Residents win (new seat)			

=== Burstead (3 seats) ===
Location of Burstead ward

Burstead (3)
Party	Candidate	Votes	%
Residents	C. Jones	3,324	
Residents	B. Hooks	3,220	
Residents	J. Kemp	3,048	
Conservative	F. Janaway	2,480	
Conservative	M. Marshall	2,466	
Conservative	J. Wright	2,402	
Labour	A. Edge	646	
Labour	L. Edge	637	
Labour	R. Pattle	628	
Turnout			82.6%
Residents win (new seat)			
Residents win (new seat)			
Residents win (new seat)			

=== Fryerns Central (3 seats) ===
Location of Fryerns Central ward

Fryerns Central (3)
Party	Candidate	Votes	%
Labour	P. Ballard	3,800	
Labour	R. Walker	3,656	
Labour	C. O'Brien	3,617	
Conservative	R. Sheridan	2,239	
Conservative	E. Cullis	2,201	
Conservative	E. Roy	2,081	
Liberal	H. Lutton	892	
Turnout			75.3%
Labour win (new seat)			
Labour win (new seat)			
Labour win (new seat)			

=== Fryerns East (3 seats) ===
Location of Fryerns East ward

Fryerns East (3)
Party	Candidate	Votes	%
Labour	A. Dove	3,457	
Labour	J. Potter	2,958	
Labour	D. Harrison	2,842	
Conservative	D. Barker	2,184	
Conservative	M. Manouvrier	2,080	
Conservative	R. Pennell	1,967	
Liberal	D. Mavis	776	
Turnout			74.7%
Labour win (new seat)			
Labour win (new seat)			
Labour win (new seat)			

=== Laindon (3 seats) ===
Location of Laindon ward

Laindon (3)
Party	Candidate	Votes	%
Conservative	G. Doyle	1,707	
Conservative	D. Lovey	1,543	
Conservative	V. York	1,508	
Labour	K. Godley	1,145	
Labour	I. Harlow	1,072	
Labour	T. Wilson	1,043	
Liberal	J. Massie	356	
Turnout			74.8%
Conservative win (new seat)			
Conservative win (new seat)			
Conservative win (new seat)			

=== Langdon Hills (3 seats) ===
Location of Langdon Hills ward

Langdon Hills (3)
Party	Candidate	Votes	%
Labour	C. Lynch	2,110	
Conservative	J. Hunter	2,039	
Labour	J. Bielby	1,982	
Conservative	R. Read	1,960	
Conservative	M. Davies	1,941	
Labour	M. Lynch	1,888	
Liberal	I. Campion-Smith	621	
Turnout			70.8%
Labour win (new seat)			
Conservative win (new seat)			
Labour win (new seat)			

=== Lee Chapel North (3 seats) ===
Location of Lee Chapel North ward

Lee Chapel North (3)
Party	Candidate	Votes	%
Labour	J. Costello	3,634	
Labour	R. Austin	3,208	
Labour	D. Austin	3,139	
Conservative	R. Wallis	1,892	
Conservative	G. Dobbs	1,845	
Conservative	W. West	1,710	
Liberal	M. Howard	764	
Turnout			79.2%
Labour win (new seat)			
Labour win (new seat)			
Labour win (new seat)			

=== Nethermayne (3 seats) ===
Location of Nethermayne ward

Nethermayne (3)
Party	Candidate	Votes	%
Conservative	S. Blackbourn	2,974	
Conservative	P. Cole	2,752	
Conservative	H. Tucker	2,633	
Labour	P. Davey	2,595	
Labour	A. Borlase	2,475	
Labour	G. Krejzl	2,318	
Liberal	B. Holmes	834	
Turnout			78.4%
Conservative win (new seat)			
Conservative win (new seat)			
Conservative win (new seat)			

=== Pitsea East (3 seats) ===
Location of Pitsea East ward

Pitsea East (3)
Party	Candidate	Votes	%
Conservative	E. Dines	1,780	
Conservative	K. Emery	1,760	
Conservative	F. Laine	1,655	
Labour	W. Blunkell	1,427	
Labour	R. Oliver	1,369	
Labour	D. Marks	1,275	
Liberal	S. Holmes	492	
Turnout			72.0%
Conservative win (new seat)			
Conservative win (new seat)			
Conservative win (new seat)			

=== Pitsea West (3 seats) ===
Location of Pitsea West ward

Pitsea West (3)
Party	Candidate	Votes	%
Labour	J. Amey	2,942	
Labour	H. Tinworth	2,577	
Labour	E. Gelder	2,567	
Conservative	A. Dines	2,229	
Conservative	D. McCree	2,106	
Conservative	A. McIntyre	2,005	
Liberal	B. Mavis	1,195	
Turnout			72.5%
Labour win (new seat)			
Labour win (new seat)			
Labour win (new seat)			

=== Vange (3 seats) ===
Location of Vange ward

Vange (3)
Party	Candidate	Votes	%
Labour	G. Miller	2,692	
Labour	H. Miller	2,576	
Labour	H. Witzer	2,334	
Conservative	J. Dolby	1,902	
Conservative	J. Ross	1,873	
Conservative	A. Oram	1,857	
Liberal	S. Massie	739	
Turnout			73.7%
Labour win (new seat)			
Labour win (new seat)			
Labour win (new seat)			

=== Wickford North (3 seats) ===
Location of Wickford North ward

Wickford North (3)
Party	Candidate	Votes	%
Conservative	V. Ridley	3,615	
Conservative	B. Pummell	3,435	
Conservative	L. Yorke	3,286	
Labour	R. Turpin	1,782	
Labour	J. Selby	1,737	
Labour	M. Walsh	1,662	
Liberal	M. Samson	1,460	
Turnout			73.7%
Conservative win (new seat)			
Conservative win (new seat)			
Conservative win (new seat)			

=== Wickford South (3 seats) ===
Location of Wickford South ward

Wickford South (3)
Party	Candidate	Votes	%
Conservative	C. Ball	3,842	
Conservative	T. Taylor	3,529	
Conservative	G. Jones	3,276	
Labour	A. Coupe	1,492	
Labour	L. Borlase	1,267	
Labour	A. McCartan	1,119	
Liberal	T. Kabir	1,008	
Turnout			82.9%
Conservative win (new seat)			
Conservative win (new seat)			
Conservative win (new seat)			
