= 1980 Basildon District Council election =

1980 UK local government election

- 1 May 1980

14 of the 42 seats to Basildon District Council 22 seats needed for a majority
	First party	Second party	Third party
Party	Labour	Conservative	Residents
Last election	17	16	9
Seats won	9	2	3
Seats after	20	13	9
Seat change	▲3	▼3	Steady
Popular vote	19,298	13,961	5,073
Percentage	45.8%	33.2%	12.1%
- Map showing the results of contested wards in the 1980 Basildon Borough Council elections.
Council control before election
No overall control
Council control after election
No overall control

The 1980 Basildon District Council election took place on 1 May 1980 to elect members of Basildon District Council in Essex, England. This was on the same day as other local elections. One third of the council was up for election; the seats of the candidates who finished third in each ward in the all-out election of 1979. The council remained under no overall control.

== Overall results ==
1980 Basildon District Council Election
Party	Seats	Gains	Losses	Net gain/loss	Seats %	Votes %	Votes	+/−
Labour	9	3	0	▲3		45.8	19,298	
Residents	3	0	0	Steady		12.1	5,073	
Conservative	2	0	3	▼3		33.2	13,961	
Liberal	0	0	0	Steady	0.0	8.4	3,521	
Independent	0	0	0	Steady	0.0	0.6	241	
Total	14						42,094	

== Ward results ==
=== Billericay East ===
Location of Billericay East ward

Billericay East
Party	Candidate	Votes	%
Residents	M. White	1,781	44.2%
Conservative	R. Marshall	1,677	41.6%
Labour	I. Harlow	408	10.1%
Liberal	I. Campion-Smith	163	4.0%
Turnout			49.1%
Residents hold			

=== Billericay West ===
Location of Billericay West ward

Billericay West
Party	Candidate	Votes	%
Residents	H. Wilkins	1,733	55.1%
Conservative	F. Tomlin	1,246	39.6%
Labour	P. Rackley	168	5.3%
Turnout			47.2%
Residents hold			

=== Burstead ===
Location of Burstead ward

Burstead
Party	Candidate	Votes	%
Residents	J. Kemp	1,559	45.7%
Conservative	F. Janaway	1,295	38.0%
Labour	R. Pattle	369	10.8%
Liberal	A. Lycett	187	5.5%
Turnout			41.5%
Residents hold			

=== Fryerns Central ===
Location of Fryerns Central ward

Fryerns Central
Party	Candidate	Votes	%
Labour	C. O'Brien	2,438	70.6%
Conservative	R. Sheridan	580	16.8%
Liberal	D. Richardson	249	7.2%
Independent Residents	R. Chaplin	185	5.4%
Turnout			37.6%
Labour hold			

=== Fryerns East ===
Location of Fryerns East ward

Fryerns East
Party	Candidate	Votes	%
Labour	D. Harrison	2,077	75.0%
Conservative	R. Pennell	507	18.3%
Liberal	D. Mavis	130	4.7%
Independent Residents	C. Cooper	56	2.0%
Turnout			32.1%
Labour hold			

=== Laindon ===
Location of Laindon ward

Laindon
Party	Candidate	Votes	%
Labour	T. Wilson	1,047	52.8%
Conservative	V. York	817	41.2%
Liberal	M. Howard	120	6.0%
Turnout			41.4%
Labour gain from Conservative			

=== Langdon Hills ===
Location of Langdon Hills ward

Langdon Hills
Party	Candidate	Votes	%
Labour	J. Bielby	1,223	51.6%
Conservative	R. Read	683	28.8%
Liberal	R. Payne	462	19.5%
Turnout			37.2%
Labour hold			

=== Lee Chapel North ===
Location of Lee Chapel North ward

Lee Chapel North
Party	Candidate	Votes	%
Labour	D. Austin	2,361	74.6%
Conservative	G. Dobbs	466	14.7%
Liberal	S. Massie	336	10.6%
Turnout			40.3%
Labour hold			

=== Nethermayne ===
Location of Nethermayne ward

Nethermayne
Party	Candidate	Votes	%
Labour	P. Davey	1,779	53.7%
Conservative	H. Tucker	1,259	38.0%
Liberal	G. Williams	276	8.3%
Turnout			41.6%
Labour gain from Conservative			

=== Pitsea East ===
Location of Pitsea East ward

Pitsea East
Party	Candidate	Votes	%
Labour	M. Howe	1,262	57.7%
Conservative	F. Laine	749	34.2%
Liberal	R. Hawksworth	178	8.1%
Turnout			35.0%
Labour gain from Conservative			

=== Pitsea West ===
Location of Pitsea West ward

Pitsea West
Party	Candidate	Votes	%
Labour	D. Marks	2,204	70.0%
Conservative	A. Dines	655	20.8%
Liberal	B. Mavis	291	9.2%
Turnout			36.3%
Labour hold			

=== Vange ===
Location of Vange ward

Vange
Party	Candidate	Votes	%
Labour	H. Witzer	1,863	70.9%
Conservative	J. Dolby	529	20.1%
Liberal	A. Lutton	236	9.0%
Turnout			35.2%
Labour hold			

=== Wickford North ===
Location of Wickford North ward

Wickford North
Party	Candidate	Votes	%
Conservative	L. Yorke	1,923	50.5%
Labour	R.Oliver	1,375	36.1%
Liberal	M. Samson	512	13.4%
Turnout			47.5%
Conservative hold			

=== Wickford South ===
Location of Wickford South ward

Wickford South
Party	Candidate	Votes	%
Conservative	G. Jones	1,575	58.8%
Labour	R. Turpin	724	27.0%
Liberal	A. McCartan	381	14.2%
Turnout			34.6%
Conservative hold			
