= 1983 Basildon District Council election =

1983 UK local government election

- 5 May 1983

14 of the 42 seats to Basildon District Council 22 seats needed for a majority
	First party	Second party
Party	Labour	Conservative
Seats before	22	12
Seats won	8	6
Seats after	24	13
Seat change	▲2	▲1
Popular vote	17,892	19,478
Percentage	36.7%	40.0%
	Third party	Fourth party
Party	Alliance	Residents
Seats before	3	5
Seats won	0	0
Seats after	3	2
Seat change	Steady	▼3
Popular vote	10,039	1,295
Percentage	20.6%	2.7%
- Map showing the results of contested wards in the 1983 Basildon Borough Council elections.
Council control before election
Labour Party
Council control after election
Labour Party

The 1983 Basildon District Council election took place on 5 May 1983 to elect members of Basildon District Council in Essex, England. This was on the same day as other local elections. The Labour Party retained control of the council, which it had won at the previous election in 1982.

== Overall results ==
1983 Basildon district council election
Party	Seats	Gains	Losses	Net gain/loss	Seats %	Votes %	Votes	+/−
Labour	8	2	0	▲2	57.1	36.7	17,892	
Conservative	6	3	2	▲1	42.9	40.0	19,478	
Alliance	0	0	0	Steady	0.0	20.6	10,039	
Residents	0	0	3	▼3	0.0	2.7	1,295	
Total	14						48,704	

== Ward results ==
=== Billericay East ===
Location of Billericay East ward

Billericay East
Party	Candidate	Votes	%
Conservative	B. Lea	2,503	63.6%
Alliance	G. Cronkshaw	819	20.8%
Labour	A. Chipperfield	615	15.6%
Turnout			46.4%
Conservative gain from Residents			

=== Billericay West ===
Location of Billericay West ward

Billericay West
Party	Candidate	Votes	%
Conservative	B. Johnson	2,508	66.5%
Alliance	G. Taylor	902	23.9%
Labour	M. Baker	363	9.6%
Turnout			48.3%
Conservative gain from Residents			

=== Burstead ===
Location of Burstead ward

Burstead
Party	Candidate	Votes	%
Conservative	G. Parr	2,025	52.6%
Residents	C. Jones	1,295	33.6%
Labour	I. Harlow	533	13.8%
Turnout			46.1%
Conservative gain from Residents			

=== Fryerns Central ===
Location of Fryerns Central ward

Fryerns Central
Party	Candidate	Votes	%
Labour	P. Ballard	2,032	50.5%
Alliance	J. White	1,300	32.3%
Conservative	L. Tilt	693	17.2%
Turnout			44.3%
Labour hold			

=== Fryerns East ===
Location of Fryerns East ward

Fryerns East
Party	Candidate	Votes	%
Labour	A. Dove	1,766	62.5%
Conservative	A. Ball	718	25.4%
Alliance	F. Crow	340	12.0%
Turnout			34.0%
Labour hold			

=== Laindon ===
Location of Laindon ward

Laindon
Party	Candidate	Votes	%
Conservative	J. Blerkom	1,421	42.8%
Labour	P. Rackley	1,364	41.1%
Alliance	M. Howard	532	16.0%
Turnout			44.3%
Conservative hold			

=== Langdon Hills ===
Location of Langdon Hills ward

Langdon Hills
Party	Candidate	Votes	%
Labour	C. Lynch	1,071	37.2%
Alliance	K. Lack	978	33.9%
Conservative	A. Dines	832	28.9%
Turnout			39.5%
Labour hold			

=== Lee Chapel North ===
Location of Lee Chapel North ward

Lee Chapel North
Party	Candidate	Votes	%
Labour	J. Costello	1,959	60.2%
Conservative	R. Kemp	731	22.5%
Alliance	K. Neil	564	17.3%
Turnout			40.9%
Labour hold			

=== Nethermayne ===
Location of Nethermayne ward

Nethermayne
Party	Candidate	Votes	%
Labour	E. Gelder	1,512	38.9%
Conservative	P. Cole	1,322	34.0%
Alliance	A. Lutton	1,057	27.2%
Turnout			48.7%
Labour gain from Conservative			

=== Pitsea East ===
Location of Pitsea East ward

Pitsea East
Party	Candidate	Votes	%
Labour	W. Hodge	2,106	64.7%
Conservative	E. Dines	1,331	39.3%
Alliance	B. Simmons	442	13.0%
Turnout			40.4%
Labour gain from Conservative			

=== Pitsea West ===
Location of Pitsea West ward

Pitsea West
Party	Candidate	Votes	%
Labour	J. Amey	2,014	62.1%
Conservative	P. Tomkins	869	26.8%
Alliance	A. Scott	360	11.1%
Turnout			36.9%
Labour hold			

=== Vange ===
Location of Vange ward

Vange
Party	Candidate	Votes	%
Labour	G. Miller	1,589	58.7%
Conservative	J. Dolby	752	27.8%
Alliance	P. Harding	364	13.5%
Turnout			35.8%
Labour hold			

=== Wickford North ===
Location of Wickford North ward

Wickford North
Party	Candidate	Votes	%
Conservative	H. Leibner	1,998	54.8%
Labour	L. Wignall	1,033	28.3%
Alliance	M. Birch	617	16.9%
Turnout			44.0%
Conservative hold			

=== Wickford South ===
Location of Wickford South ward

Wickford South
Party	Candidate	Votes	%
Conservative	T. Ball	1,775	44.8%
Labour	G. Palmer	1,764	44.5%
Alliance	R. Turpin	425	10.7%
Turnout			49.9%
Conservative hold			
