= 2023 Basildon Borough Council election =

2023 English local election

| ← 2022 | 4 May 2023 | 2024 → |

14 out of 42 seats to Basildon Borough Council 22 seats needed for a majority

| | First party | Second party |
|---|---|---|
| Leader | Andrew Baggott | Maryam Yaqub |
| Party | Conservative | Labour |
| Last election | 23 seats, 49.0% | 10 seats, 23.6% |
| Seats before | 25 | 10 |
| Seats won | 6 | 6 |
| Seats after | 26 | 10 |
| Seat change | ▲1 | Steady |
| Popular vote | 11,111 | 8,342 |
| Percentage | 38.8% | 29.1% |
| Swing | ▼10.2% | ▲5.5% |
| | Third party | Fourth party |
| Leader | Kerry Smith | David Harrison |
| Party | Independent | Wickford Ind. |
| Last election | 7 seats, 9.5% | 2 seats, 6.4% |
| Seats before | 5 | 2 |
| Seats won | 1 | 1 |
| Seats after | 5 | 1 |
| Seat change | Steady | ▼1 |
| Popular vote | 2,202 | 2,219 |
| Percentage | 7.7% | 7.7% |
| Swing | ▼1.8% | ▲1.3% |
- Winner of each seat at the 2023 Basildon Borough Council election
Leader before election
Andrew Baggott
Conservative
Leader after election
Andrew Baggott
Conservative

The 2023 Basildon Borough Council election took place on 4 May 2023 to elect members of Basildon Borough Council in Essex, England. This was on the same day as other local elections in England.

The council remained under Conservative control.

== Summary ==
=== Election result ===
2023 Basildon Borough Council election
| Party | This election | | | Full council | | | This election | | |
| Party | Seats | Net | Seats % | Other | Total | Total % | Votes | Votes % | +/− |
|---|---|---|---|---|---|---|---|---|---|
| Conservative | 6 | ▲1 | 42.9 | 20 | 26 | 59.1 | 11,111 | 38.8 | –10.2 |
| Labour | 6 | Steady | 42.9 | 4 | 10 | 22.7 | 8,342 | 29.1 | +5.5 |
| Independent | 1 | Steady | 7.1 | 4 | 5 | 15.9 | 2,202 | 7.7 | –1.8 |
| Wickford Ind. | 1 | ▼1 | 7.1 | 0 | 1 | 2.3 | 2,219 | 7.7 | +1.3 |
| Liberal Democrats | 0 | Steady | 0.0 | 0 | 0 | 0.0 | 3,808 | 13.3 | +2.7 |
| Green | 0 | Steady | 0.0 | 0 | 0 | 0.0 | 526 | 1.1 | N/A |
| TUSC | 0 | Steady | 0.0 | 0 | 0 | 0.0 | 184 | 0.6 | +0.5 |
| Reform UK | 0 | Steady | 0.0 | 0 | 0 | 0.0 | 120 | 0.4 | –0.1 |
| British Democrats | 0 | Steady | 0.0 | 0 | 0 | 0.0 | 89 | 0.3 | ±0.0 |
| Breakthrough Party | 0 | Steady | 0.0 | 0 | 0 | 0.0 | 55 | 0.2 | N/A |

== Ward results ==
The Statement of Persons Nominated, which details the candidates standing in each ward, was released by Basildon Borough Council following the close of nomination on 5 April 2023.

=== Billericay East ===
Billericay East
| Party | Candidate | Votes | % | ±% |
|---|---|---|---|---|
| Conservative | David Dadds* | 1,703 | 60.4 | –6.7 |
| Liberal Democrats | Laura Clark | 592 | 21.0 | +1.3 |
| Labour | Peter Bunyan | 525 | 18.6 | +5.4 |
| Majority | | 1,111 | 39.4 | –8.0 |
| Turnout | | 2,831 | 30.0 | –2.5 |
| Registered electors | | 9,432 | | |
| Conservative hold | | Swing | ▼4.0 | |

=== Billericay West ===
Billericay West
| Party | Candidate | Votes | % | ±% |
|---|---|---|---|---|
| Conservative | Daniel Lawrence* | 1,523 | 51.4 | –5.2 |
| Liberal Democrats | Chris May | 1,062 | 35.9 | –1.6 |
| Labour | Gillian Palmer | 208 | 7.0 | +1.2 |
| Green | Andrew Brennan | 168 | 5.7 | N/A |
| Majority | | 461 | 15.5 | –3.6 |
| Turnout | | 2,980 | 31.6 | –6.0 |
| Registered electors | | 9,429 | | |
| Conservative hold | | Swing | ▼1.8 | |

=== Burstead ===
Burstead
| Party | Candidate | Votes | % | ±% |
|---|---|---|---|---|
| Conservative | Kevin Blake* | 1,574 | 60.7 | –5.0 |
| Liberal Democrats | Chris Daffin | 533 | 20.6 | –2.6 |
| Labour | Malcolm Reid | 318 | 12.3 | +1.1 |
| Green | Stewart Goshawk | 166 | 6.4 | N/A |
| Majority | | 1,041 | 40.1 | –2.4 |
| Turnout | | 2,607 | 29.8 | –4.1 |
| Registered electors | | 8,760 | | |
| Conservative hold | | Swing | ▼1.2 | |

=== Fryerns ===
Fryerns
| Party | Candidate | Votes | % | ±% |
|---|---|---|---|---|
| Labour | Allan Davies* | 1,165 | 63.6 | +7.3 |
| Conservative | Saneep Sandhu | 505 | 27.6 | –5.1 |
| Liberal Democrats | Vivien Howard | 161 | 8.8 | –2.2 |
| Majority | | 660 | 36.0 | +12.4 |
| Turnout | | 1,849 | 17.5 | –0.7 |
| Registered electors | | 10,580 | | |
| Labour hold | | Swing | ▲6.2 | |

=== Laindon Park ===
Laindon Park
| Party | Candidate | Votes | % | ±% |
|---|---|---|---|---|
| Labour | Victoria Joseph | 754 | 35.4 | +0.2 |
| Conservative | Christopher Allen | 729 | 34.3 | –17.5 |
| Independent | Tina Arnold | 307 | 14.4 | N/A |
| Liberal Democrats | Stephen McCarthy | 101 | 4.7 | –1.6 |
| Green | Oliver McCarthy | 93 | 4.4 | N/A |
| British Democrats | Christopher Bateman | 89 | 4.2 | N/A |
| Breakthrough Party | Phil Rackley | 55 | 2.6 | N/A |
| Majority | | 25 | 1.1 | N/A |
| Turnout | | 2,135 | 21.4 | –0.3 |
| Registered electors | | 9,979 | | |
| Labour hold | | Swing | ▲8.9 | |

=== Lee Chapel North ===
Lee Chapel North
| Party | Candidate | Votes | % | ±% |
|---|---|---|---|---|
| Labour | Terry Webb | 954 | 59.6 | +20.6 |
| Conservative | Martyn Mordecai | 468 | 29.2 | –8.0 |
| Liberal Democrats | Mike Chandler | 180 | 11.2 | +6.6 |
| Majority | | 486 | 30.4 | +28.6 |
| Turnout | | 1,619 | 15.9 | –8.3 |
| Registered electors | | 10,163 | | |
| Labour hold | | Swing | ▲14.3 | |

=== Nethermayne ===
Nethermayne
| Party | Candidate | Votes | % | ±% |
|---|---|---|---|---|
| Independent | Mo Larkin* | 1,560 | 66.3 | –3.5 |
| Labour | Calum Caira-Neeson | 450 | 19.1 | +4.7 |
| Conservative | Stanley Edemakhiota | 226 | 9.6 | –2.4 |
| Liberal Democrats | Stephen Nice | 116 | 4.9 | +1.1 |
| Majority | | 1,110 | 47.2 | –8.2 |
| Turnout | | 2,363 | 22.3 | –4.5 |
| Registered electors | | 10,592 | | |
| Independent hold | | Swing | ▼4.1 | |

=== Pitsea North West ===
Pitsea North West
| Party | Candidate | Votes | % | ±% |
|---|---|---|---|---|
| Labour | Patricia Reid* | 872 | 49.3 | +3.2 |
| Conservative | Mark Cottrell | 675 | 38.2 | –8.9 |
| Liberal Democrats | Martin Howard | 121 | 6.8 | +0.1 |
| Green | Rainbow Serina | 99 | 5.6 | N/A |
| Majority | | 197 | 11.1 | N/A |
| Turnout | | 1,781 | 19.3 | –2.0 |
| Registered electors | | 9,245 | | |
| Labour hold | | Swing | ▲6.1 | |

=== Pitsea South East ===
Pitsea South East
| Party | Candidate | Votes | % | ±% |
|---|---|---|---|---|
| Conservative | Craig Rimmer* | 915 | 40.9 | –18.8 |
| Labour | Matthew Wright | 896 | 40.1 | –0.2 |
| Independent | Iurie Cojocaru | 335 | 15.0 | N/A |
| Liberal Democrats | Peter Lancaster | 90 | 4.0 | N/A |
| Majority | | 19 | 0.8 | –18.6 |
| Turnout | | 2,247 | 24.7 | +0.5 |
| Registered electors | | 9,088 | | |
| Conservative hold | | Swing | ▼9.3 | |

=== St Martin's ===
St Martin's
| Party | Candidate | Votes | % | ±% |
|---|---|---|---|---|
| Labour | Maryam Yaqub* | 628 | 51.6 | +13.3 |
| Conservative | Deepak Shukla | 322 | 26.4 | –13.1 |
| Liberal Democrats | Philip Jenkins | 149 | 12.2 | +7.5 |
| TUSC | Andrew Buxton | 119 | 9.8 | N/A |
| Majority | | 306 | 25.2 | +24.0 |
| Turnout | | 1,225 | 17.5 | –7.7 |
| Registered electors | | 7,003 | | |
| Labour hold | | Swing | ▲13.2 | |

=== Vange ===
Vange
| Party | Candidate | Votes | % | ±% |
|---|---|---|---|---|
| Labour | Melissa McGeorge* | 630 | 52.5 | +13.6 |
| Conservative | Lewis Smith | 436 | 36.4 | –8.5 |
| Liberal Democrats | Peter Smith | 68 | 5.7 | +2.7 |
| TUSC | Dave Murray | 65 | 5.4 | N/A |
| Majority | | 194 | 16.1 | N/A |
| Turnout | | 1,209 | 17.1 | –6.4 |
| Registered electors | | 7,061 | | |
| Labour hold | | Swing | ▲11.1 | |

=== Wickford Castledon ===
Wickford Castledon
| Party | Candidate | Votes | % | ±% |
|---|---|---|---|---|
| Conservative | Don Morris* | 668 | 37.8 | –14.3 |
| Wickford Ind. | David Harrison* | 442 | 25.0 | +3.7 |
| Liberal Democrats | Stewart Mott | 390 | 22.1 | +18.7 |
| Labour | Francesca Rothery | 266 | 15.1 | –8.1 |
| Majority | | 226 | 12.8 | –16.1 |
| Turnout | | 1,766 | 27.4 | –1.0 |
| Registered electors | | 6,439 | | |
| Conservative hold | | Swing | ▼9.0 | |

=== Wickford North ===
Wickford North
| Party | Candidate | Votes | % | ±% |
|---|---|---|---|---|
| Wickford Ind. | Eunice Brockman* | 1,180 | 45.3 | +7.4 |
| Conservative | Mike Metcalfe | 754 | 28.9 | –12.7 |
| Labour | James Wood | 389 | 14.9 | +0.8 |
| Liberal Democrats | Nicola Hoad | 162 | 6.2 | –0.2 |
| Reform UK | Dave Collins | 120 | 4.6 | N/A |
| Majority | | 426 | 16.4 | N/A |
| Turnout | | 2,609 | 25.4 | –3.0 |
| Registered electors | | 10,288 | | |
| Wickford Ind. hold | | Swing | ▲10.1 | |

=== Wickford Park ===
Wickford Park
| Party | Candidate | Votes | % | ±% |
|---|---|---|---|---|
| Conservative | Yvonne Child | 613 | 38.8 | –9.2 |
| Wickford Ind. | Trevor Hammond | 597 | 37.8 | +4.9 |
| Labour | Dylan Wright | 287 | 18.2 | –0.9 |
| Liberal Democrats | Simon Blake | 83 | 5.3 | N/A |
| Majority | | 16 | 1.0 | –14.1 |
| Turnout | | 1,585 | 21.6 | –3.0 |
| Registered electors | | 7,342 | | |
| Conservative gain from Wickford Ind. | | Swing | ▼7.1 | |
