= 2027 Basildon Borough Council election =

2027 English local government election

2027 Basildon Borough Council elections
- 6 May 2027
Leader	Andy Barnes	Gavin Callaghan	Sam Journet
Party	Conservative	Labour	Reform
Leader's seat	Billericay East	St Martin's	St Martin's
Last election	12 seats, 25.4%	12 seats, 15.2%	11 seats, 40.8%
Current seats	12	12	11
Leader	Mo Larkin	Eunice Brockman
Party	Independent	Wickford Ind.
Leader's seat	Nethermayne	Wickford North
Last election	4 seats, 4.2%	3 seats, 1.3%
Current seats	4	3
Incumbent Leader
Andy Barnes
Conservative
No overall control (Note: Conservative minority.)

The 2027 Basildon Borough Council election will be held on 6 May 2027 to elect members of Basildon Borough Council in Essex, England. This will be on the same day as other local elections held across the United Kingdom.

== Background ==
=== Local government reorganisation ===
Due to proposed structural changes to local government in England, the 2026 election was intended to be the final election to the council before it was abolished and replaced by South West Essex Council, a unitary authority. However, on 7 September 2026, the government announced it was withdrawing plans for the planned restructuring pending review. Following this announcement, local elections due to be held in 2027 under the existing local electoral calendar would proceed.

== Summary ==
=== Election result ===
2027 Basildon Borough Council election
Party	This election				Full council			This election		
Party	Candidates	Seats	Net	Seats %	Other	Total	Total %	Votes	Votes %	+/−
Conservative					7					
Labour					6					
Reform					11					
Independent					2					
Wickford Ind.					2					

=== Incumbents ===
Ward	Incumbent councillor	Affiliation	Re-standing
Billericay East	Andy Barnes	Conservative	
Billericay West	Phil Turner	Conservative	
Burstead	Richard Moore	Conservative	
Castledon & Crouch	Terri Sargent	Conservative	
Fryerns	Andrew Ansell	Labour	
Laindon Park	Jessica Power	Labour	
Langdon Hills	Val Robbins	Independent	
Lee Chapel North	Melissa McGeorge	Labour	
Nethermayne	Mo Larkin	Independent	
Pitsea North West	Emma Callaghan	Labour	
Pitsea South East	Gillian Palmer	Labour	
St Martin's	Jack Ferguson	Labour	
Wickford North	David Aldridge	Wickford Ind.	
Wickford Park	George Jeffery	Conservative	
