= 2022 Basildon Borough Council election =

2022 UK local government election

← 2021	4 May 2022	2023 →

14 out of 41 seats to Basildon Borough Council 21 seats needed for a majority

	First party	Second party
Party	Conservative	Labour
Last election	22 seats, 48.7%	11 seats, 22.9%
Seats won	10	2
Seats after	22	10
Seat change	Steady	▼1
Popular vote	16,325	7,861
Percentage	49.0%	23.6%
Swing	▲0.3%	▲0.7%
	Third party	Fourth party
Party	Independent	Wickford Ind.
Last election	6 seats, 10.0%	2 seats, 2.6%
Seats won	2	0
Seats after	7	2
Seat change	▲1	Steady
Popular vote	3,147	2,133
Percentage	9.5%	6.4%
Swing	▼0.5%	▲3.8%
- Winner of each seat at the 2022 Basildon Borough Council election
Council control before election
Conservative
Council control after election
Conservative

The 2022 Basildon Borough Council election took place on 5 May 2022 to elect members of Basildon Borough Council in Essex. This was on the same day as other local elections.

== Results summary ==
2022 Basildon Borough Council election
Party	This election			Full council			This election		
Party	Seats	Net	Seats %	Other	Total	Total %	Votes	Votes %	+/−
Conservative	10	Steady	71.4	12	22	53.7	16,325	49.0	+0.3
Labour	2	▼1	14.3	8	10	24.4	7,861	23.6	+0.7
Independent	2	▲1	14.3	5	7	17.1	3,147	9.5	-0.5
Wickford Ind.	0	Steady	0.0	2	2	4.9	2,133	6.4	+3.8
Liberal Democrats	0	Steady	0.0	0	0	0.0	3,528	10.6	+1.6
Reform UK	0	Steady	0.0	0	0	0.0	157	0.5	-0.9
British Democrats	0	Steady	0.0	0	0	0.0	100	0.3	N/A
TUSC	0	Steady	0.0	0	0	0.0	47	0.1	N/A

== Ward results ==
=== Billericay East ===
Billericay East
Party	Candidate	Votes	%	±%
Conservative	Andrew Schrader	2,062	67.1	−2.8
Liberal Democrats	Laura Clark	604	19.7	+9.1
Labour	Peter Bunyan	405	13.2	−3.8
Majority		1,458	47.4	
Turnout		3,071	32.5	
Conservative hold		Swing	▼6.0	

=== Billericay West ===
Billericay West
Party	Candidate	Votes	%	±%
Conservative	Anthony Hedley	2,005	56.6	+6.6
Liberal Democrats	Timothy Nicklin	1,329	37.5	−7.2
Labour	Sally Bunyan	206	5.8	+0.5
Majority		676	19.1	
Turnout		3,540	37.6	
Conservative hold		Swing	▲6.9	

=== Burstead ===
Burstead
Party	Candidate	Votes	%	±%
Conservative	Andrew Baggott	1,948	65.7	−10.2
Liberal Democrats	John Daffin	687	23.2	+11.7
Labour	Malcolm Reid	332	11.2	−1.4
Majority		1,261	42.5	
Turnout		2,967	33.9	
Conservative hold		Swing	▼11.0	

=== Crouch ===
Crouch
Party	Candidate	Votes	%	±%
Conservative	Terri Sargent	1,311	76.3	+4.8
Labour	Tracey Hilton	408	23.7	+8.1
Majority		903	52.6	
Turnout		1,719	25.5	
Conservative hold		Swing	▼1.7	

=== Fryerns ===
Fryerns
Party	Candidate	Votes	%	±%
Labour	David Kirkman	1,074	56.3	+15.3
Conservative	Sandeep Sandhu	624	32.7	−0.4
Liberal Democrats	Vivien Howard	209	11.0	+8.2
Majority		450	23.6	
Turnout		1,907	18.2	
Labour hold		Swing	▲7.9	

=== Laindon Park ===
Laindon Park
Party	Candidate	Votes	%	±%
Conservative	Jeff Henry	1,123	51.8	−2.8
Labour	David Goddard	763	35.2	+8.2
Liberal Democrats	Stephen McCarthy	136	6.3	+2.8
British Democrats	Christopher Bateman	100	4.6	N/A
TUSC	David Murray	47	2.2	N/A
Majority		360	16.6	
Turnout		2,169	21.7	
Conservative hold		Swing	▼5.5	

=== Langdon Hills ===
Langdon Hills
Party	Candidate	Votes	%	±%
Independent	Walter Brown	1,201	50.3	+17.1
Conservative	Christopher Allen	883	37.0	−6.0
Labour	Clarence Zwengunde	237	9.9	−2.6
Liberal Democrats	Christopher May	68	2.8	−8.4
Majority		318	13.3	
Turnout		2,389	34.2	
Independent gain from Conservative		Swing	▲11.6	

=== Lee Chapel North ===
Lee Chapel North
Party	Candidate	Votes	%	±%
Labour	Susanna Caira-Neeson	1,006	55.5	+16.5
Conservative	Deepak Shukla	649	35.8	−1.4
Reform UK	Norma Saggers	157	8.7	+3.7
Majority		357	19.7	
Turnout		1,812	17.9	
Labour hold		Swing	▲9.0	

=== Nethermayne ===
Nethermayne
Party	Candidate	Votes	%	±%
Independent	Kerry Smith	1,946	69.8	+24.1
Labour	Dylan Wright	402	14.4	−2.2
Conservative	Chima Okorafor	334	12.0	−8.4
Liberal Democrats	Stephen Nice	106	3.8	+0.2
Majority		1,544	55.4	
Turnout		2,788	26.8	
Independent hold		Swing	▲13.2	

=== Pitsea North West ===
Pitsea North West
Party	Candidate	Votes	%	±%
Conservative	Sam Gascoyne	931	47.1	+5.3
Labour	Jack Ferguson	911	46.1	−0.5
Liberal Democrats	Martin Howard	133	6.7	+4.0
Majority		20	1.0	
Turnout		1,975	21.3	
Conservative gain from Labour		Swing	▲2.9	

=== Pitsea South East ===
Pitsea South East
Party	Candidate	Votes	%	±%
Conservative	Luke Mackenzie	1,327	59.7	+12.6
Labour	Michael Baker	896	40.3	−4.4
Majority		431	19.4	
Turnout		2,223	24.2	
Conservative hold		Swing	▲8.5	

=== Wickford Castledon ===
Wickford Castledon
Party	Candidate	Votes	%	±%
Conservative	Alex Myers	1,030	52.1	−1.9
Labour	Matthew Wright	458	23.2	+11.1
Wickford Ind.	Charles Sansom	420	21.3	−12.6
Liberal Democrats	Stewart Mott	68	3.4	N/A
Majority		572	28.9	
Turnout		1,976	30.7	
Conservative hold		Swing	▼6.5	

=== Wickford North ===
Wickford North
Party	Candidate	Votes	%	±%
Conservative	Peter Holliman	1,224	41.6	−1.0
Wickford Ind.	Trevor Hammond	1,115	37.9	−7.0
Labour	Joseph Nemeth	415	14.1	+1.6
Liberal Democrats	Nicola Hoad	188	6.4	N/A
Majority		109	3.7	
Turnout		2,942	28.4	
Conservative hold		Swing	▲3.0	

=== Wickford Park ===
Wickford Park
Party	Candidate	Votes	%	±%
Conservative	George Jeffrey	874	48.0	+19.1
Wickford Ind.	Alan Ball	598	32.9	−38.2
Labour	Brenda Webb	348	19.1	N/A
Majority		276	15.1	
Turnout		1,820	24.6	
Conservative hold		Swing	▲28.7	

== By-elections ==
=== Nethermayne ===
Nethermayne: 20 July 2022
Party	Candidate	Votes	%	±%
Independent	Mo Larkin	909	62.7	N/A
Conservative	Mark Cottrell	233	16.1	−4.1
Labour	Dylan Wright	169	11.7	−2.7
Liberal Democrats	Stephen Nice	102	7.0	+3.2
Reform UK	Michael Kinnane	37	2.6	N/A
Majority		676	46.6	N/A
Turnout		1,450		
Independent gain from Independent				
