= Havering's Grove =

Village in Essex, England

Coordinates: 51.6269°N 0.3890°E

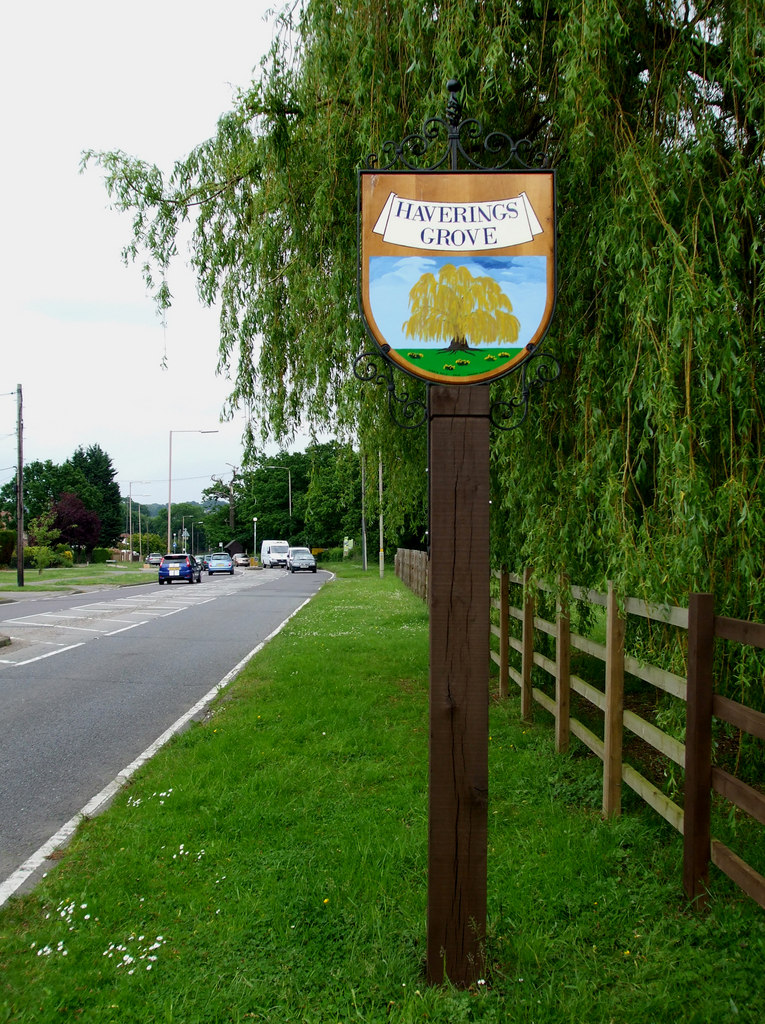
- The Havering's Grove sign, at the centre of the village

- Location within Essex
- Interactive map of Havering's Grove
- OS grid reference: TQ6595
- District: Brentwood; Basildon
- Shire county: Essex
- Region: East
- Country: England
- Sovereign state: United Kingdom
- Post town: BILLERICAY, BRENTWOOD
- Postcode district: CM12, CM13
- Dialling code: 01277
- Police: Essex
- Fire: Essex
- Ambulance: East of England
- UK Parliament: Brentwood and Ongar, Basildon and Billericay

Havering’s Grove is a village in Essex, England, which developed in the 20th century. Most of the village lies in the Borough of Brentwood, with part in the Borough of Basildon. It lies along the A129 Shenfield to Hadleigh road, between Hutton and Billericay. Although the settlement covers an extensive area, it has a low population due to the low density nature of the plotland and ribbon development that constitute most of the settlement.

== Toponymy ==
Havering’s Grove takes its name from a wood, first mentioned as Haueringewode in 1291, much of which was destroyed by plotland development. It is not clear what association there was between the wood and the Royal Liberty of Havering, but it may be that the wood was named after a local manor or farm named after a person who had migrated from Havering.

== Geography ==
Fragments of the original Havering's Grove woodland remain in the plotland area, as do fragments of another ancient woodland called Bridge Wood, beside the public right of way. There are also areas of recent secondary woodland in the plotlands. On the east side of the settlement, beside Mountnessing Brook, lies another old woodland called Shipman's Shaw.

From a map of parts of the parish of Mountnessing, drawn in around 1775, there is a Havering's Grove Farm and Havering Grove Field north of the road, just west of the modern Cowbridge Cottages.

There is a watercourse, a tributary of the River Wid called Havering Grove’s Brook; the bridge that carries the A129 over it is called Havering’s Grove Bridge. The brook, or parts of it, are also known as Lapwater Brook, which forms the boundary between the two boroughs.

A second watercourse, the Mountnessing Brook, also a tributary of the Wid, flows south-north at the eastern side of the village.

== Governance ==
The area covered by the modern village was historically part of the ancient parishes of Hutton and Mountnessing.

Havering’s Grove polling district lies in Brentwood borough’s Hutton East ward; the part in Basildon lies within the Burstead ward.

== Community ==
The village has a residents' association, which has been campaigning against the scheme to run the proposed new Norwich-Tilbury pylon route along the west side of the village.

== Amenities ==
There are retail outlets and a café, focused around a large garden centre.

A former public house, The Plough, was converted to a Turkish restaurant in 2017.
