= 2026 Basildon Borough Council election =

2026 English local government election

- 7 May 2026

14 out of 42 seats to Basildon Borough Council 22 seats needed for a majority
- Registered: 139,316
- Turnout: 57,899; 41.6%
	First party	Second party	Third party
Leader	Gavin Callaghan	Andy Barnes	None
Party	Labour	Conservative	Reform
Last election	18 seats, 25.5%	13 seats, 38.7%	0 seats, 0.5%
Seats before	16	13	1
Seats won	0	3	11
Seats after	12	12	11
Seat change	▼4	▼1	▲10
Popular vote	8,772	14,641	23,535
Percentage	15.2%	25.4%	40.8%
Swing	▼10.3%	▼13.3%	▲40.3%
	Fourth party	Fifth party
Leader	Kerry Smith	Eunice Brockman
Party	Independent	Wickford Ind.
Last election	6 seats, 11.7%	5 seats, 5.4%
Seats before	8 (Note: The 8 Independent councillors sat in the Independent and Non-Aligned Group.)	4
Seats won	0	0
Seats after	4	3
Seat change	▼4	▼1
Popular vote	2,433	727
Percentage	4.2%	1.3%
Swing	▼7.5%	▼4.1%
- Winner of each seat at the 2026 Basildon Borough Council election.
Leader before election
Gavin Callaghan
Labour
No overall control (Note: Labour minority.)
Leader after election
Andy Barnes
Conservative
No overall control (Note: Conservative minority.)

The 2026 Basildon Borough Council election took place on 7 May 2026 to elect members of Basildon Borough Council in Essex, England. This was on the same day as other local elections.

Prior to the election, the council was under no overall control, being led by Labour with support from some of the independent councillors. Reform UK won eleven of the fourteen seats being contested at this election, but the council remained under no overall control. A Conservative minority administration subsequently formed with support from Reform UK, who were not included in the administration but were given the mayoralty and a number of committee chairmanships. Conservative group leader Andy Barnes was formally appointed as the new leader of the council at the subsequent annual council meeting on 21 May 2026.

Basildon Borough Council is soon to be abolished under the plans of the English Devolution and Community Empowerment Bill and will be merged with Thurrock Council to form a new South West Essex Unitary Authority.

== Summary ==
=== Council composition ===
After 2024 election		Before 2026 election	
Party	Seats	Party	Seats
Labour	18	Labour	16
Conservative	13	Conservative	13
Wickford Ind.	5	Wickford Ind.	4
Reform	0	Reform	1
Independent	6	Independent	8

Changes 2024–2026:

- April 2025: David Harrison (Wickford Independents) dies – by-election held June 2025
- June 2025:
  - Sarah-Jane Shields (Reform) gains by-election from Wickford Independents
  - Maryam Yaqub (Labour) resigns – by-election held July 2025
  - Ben Westwick (Labour) suspended from party
- July 2025: Sam Journet (Reform) gains by-election from Labour
- March 2026: Sarah Shields leaves Reform and continues to serve as an independent

=== Election result ===
2026 Basildon Borough Council election
Party	This election				Full council			This election		
Party	Candidates	Seats	Net	Seats %	Other	Total	Total %	Votes	Votes %	+/−
Conservative	{{{candidates}}}	3	▼1	21.4	9	12	28.6	14,641	25.4	–13.3
Labour	{{{candidates}}}	0	▼4	0.0	12	12	28.6	8,772	15.2	–10.3
Reform	{{{candidates}}}	11	▲10	78.6	0	11	26.2	23,535	40.8	+40.3
Independent	{{{candidates}}}	0	▼4	0.0	4	4	9.5	2,433	4.2	–7.5
Wickford Ind.	{{{candidates}}}	0	▼1	0.0	3	3	7.1	727	1.3	–4.1
Green	{{{candidates}}}	0	Steady	0.0	0	0	0.0	4,755	8.3	+1.8
Liberal Democrats	{{{candidates}}}	0	Steady	0.0	0	0	0.0	2,454	4.3	–5.9
TUSC	{{{candidates}}}	0	Steady	0.0	0	0	0.0	262	0.5	–0.5
British Democrats	{{{candidates}}}	0	Steady	0.0	0	0	0.0	49	0.1	–0.4

== Incumbents ==
Ward	Incumbent councillor	Party	Re-standing
Billericay East	Martyn Mordecai	Conservative	Yes
Billericay West	Daniel Lawrence	Conservative	Yes
Burstead	Kevin Blake	Conservative	Yes
Castledon & Crouch	Stuart Allen	Conservative	No
Fryerns	Allan Davies	Labour	No
Laindon Park	Terry Webb	Labour	Yes, in different ward
Langdon Hills	Walter Brown	Independent	Yes
Lee Chapel North	Aidan McGurran	Labour	No
Nethermayne	Eddie Murphy	Independent	Yes
Pitsea North West	Pat Reid	Labour	Yes
Pitsea South East	Ben Westwick	Independent	No
St Martins	Sam Journet	Reform	Yes
Wickford North	Trevor Hammond	Wickford Ind.	Yes
Wickford Park	Sarah-Jane Shields	Independent	Yes

== Results by ward ==
=== Billericay East ===
Billericay East
Party	Candidate	Votes	%	±%
Conservative	Martyn Mordecai*	2,341	44.9	–4.0
Reform	Denise Martin	1,662	31.9	N/A
Green	Stewart Goshawk	773	14.8	–11.5
Labour	Peter Bunyan	249	4.8	–7.3
Liberal Democrats	Laura Clark	184	3.5	–9.2
Majority		679	13.0	N/A
Rejected ballots		24	0.5	
Turnout		5233	54.8	
Registered electors		9,546		
Conservative hold				

=== Billericay West ===
Billericay West
Party	Candidate	Votes	%	±%
Conservative	Daniel Lawrence*	2,536	50.7	+1.9
Reform	Krupa Kollabathula	1,436	28.7	N/A
Liberal Democrats	Chris May	410	8.2	–19.3
Green	Kevin Blackmore	334	6.7	–5.0
Labour	Tracey Hilton	285	5.7	–6.3
Majority		1,100	21.8	N/A
Rejected ballots		36	0.7	
Turnout		5,037	53.2	
Registered electors		9,473		
Conservative hold				

=== Burstead ===
Burstead
Party	Candidate	Votes	%	±%
Conservative	Kevin Blake*	2,654	45.2	+0.5
Reform	Phil Bruce	2,173	37.0	N/A
Green	Daniel McGarry	408	6.9	–5.3
Labour	Les Banks	391	6.7	–16.7
Liberal Democrats	Peter Lancaster	252	4.3	–15.4
Majority		481	8.2	N/A
Rejected ballots		17	0.3	
Turnout		5,895	52.8	
Registered electors		11,165		
Conservative hold				

=== Castledon & Crouch ===
Castledon & Crouch
Party	Candidate	Votes	%	±%
Reform	Zoe Hockton	2,329	50.5	N/A
Conservative	Mark Cottrell	1,123	24.3	–8.3
Liberal Democrats	Stewart Mott	654	14.2	–11.9
Labour	Stewart Blackett	240	5.2	–9.8
Green	Maximillian Giddens	217	4.7	–7.3
British Democrats	Christopher Bateman	49	1.1	–13.2
Majority		1,206	26.1	N/A
Rejected ballots		11	0.2	
Turnout		4,623	49.8	
Registered electors		9,292		
Reform gain from Conservative				

=== Fryerns ===
Fryerns
Party	Candidate	Votes	%	±%
Reform	Eileen Brown	1,594	44.4	N/A
Labour	Chelsea George	1,185	33.0	–18.9
Conservative	Ann Blake	356	9.9	–13.8
Green	Rainbow Serina	303	8.4	N/A
Liberal Democrats	Vivien Howard	78	2.2	–12.5
Independent	Eleanor Donne	38	1.1	N/A
TUSC	Simon Breedon	33	0.9	–8.8
Majority		409	11.3	N/A
Rejected ballots		20	0.6	
Turnout		3,607	34.0	
Registered electors		10,612		
Reform gain from Labour				

=== Laindon Park ===
Laindon Park
Party	Candidate	Votes	%	±%
Reform	Darren Gardner	1,679	46.5	N/A
Labour	Wayne Milne	806	22.3	–12.6
Conservative	Jeff Henry	693	19.2	–10.5
Green	Jessica Whitehead	278	7.7	–3.1
Liberal Democrats	Stephen McCarthy	116	3.2	–4.3
TUSC	Dave Murray	39	1.1	–3.6
Majority		873	24.1	N/A
Rejected ballots		5	0.1	
Turnout		3,616	36.5	
Registered electors		9,898		
Reform gain from Labour				

=== Langdon Hills ===
Langdon Hills
Party	Candidate	Votes	%	±%
Reform	Damion Lewis	1,720	34.9	N/A
Independent	Walter Brown*	1,579	32.1	–16.4
Conservative	Chris Allen	584	11.9	–6.9
Labour	Brian Button	567	11.5	–3.7
Green	Ian Murray	338	6.9	–2.4
Liberal Democrats	Steve Nice	93	2.0	–5.5
Independent	None Of The Above X	36	0.7	±0.0
Majority		141	2.9	N/A
Rejected ballots		19	0.4	
Turnout		4,936	44.9	
Registered electors		10,985		
Reform gain from Independent				

=== Lee Chapel North ===
Lee Chapel North
Party	Candidate	Votes	%	±%
Reform	Jose Kattady	1,420	43.2	N/A
Labour	Terry Webb	1,075	32.7	–21.0
Green	Emma Blackmore	334	10.2	N/A
Conservative	Deepak Shukla	315	9.6	–12.6
Liberal Democrats	Mike Chandler	112	3.4	–10.1
TUSC	Elaine McDonald	29	0.9	–9.7
Majority		345	10.5	N/A
Rejected ballots		12	0.4	
Turnout		3,297	32.7	
Registered electors		10,082		
Reform gain from Labour				

=== Nethermayne ===
Nethermayne
Party	Candidate	Votes	%	±%
Reform	Wayne Lowther	1,290	39.0	N/A
Independent	Eddie Murphy*	750	22.7	–33.6
Labour	Elsa Benn	629	19.0	–2.8
Green	Matthew Hornsby	321	9.7	N/A
Conservative	Yetunde Adeshile	265	8.0	–3.8
TUSC	Chris Huggins	52	1.6	N/A
Majority		540	16.3	N/A
Rejected ballots		9	0.3	
Turnout		3,316	33.4	
Registered electors		9,925		
Reform gain from Independent				

=== Pitsea North West ===
Pitsea North West
Party	Candidate	Votes	%	±%
Reform	Jeff Noble	1,468	47.0	N/A
Labour	Pat Reid*	893	29.0	–21.1
Conservative	Stuart Terson	384	12.4	–21.8
Green	Michelle Savage	223	7.3	N/A
Liberal Democrats	Martin Howard	85	2.7	–7.0
TUSC	Sine Surridge	22	0.7	–5.9
Majority		578	18.7	N/A
Rejected ballots		12	0.4	
Turnout		3,087	33.3	
Registered electors		9,281		
Reform gain from Labour				

=== Pitsea South East ===
Pitsea South East
Party	Candidate	Votes	%	±%
Reform	David Abrahall	1,738	47.2	N/A
Labour	Ryan McDonald	847	23.0	–16.1
Conservative	Craig Rimmer	709	19.2	–14.3
Green	Steven Willis	271	7.4	–2.3
Liberal Democrats	Steven Spowart	86	2.3	–4.6
TUSC	Jack Huggins	34	0.9	N/A
Majority		891	24.1	N/A
Rejected ballots		10	0.3	
Turnout		3,695	36.7	
Registered electors		10,063		
Reform gain from Independent				

=== St Martin's ===
St Martin's (Note: Vote share change calculated relative with July 2025 by-election; no Liberal Democrats or Social Democratic Party as previously.)
Party	Candidate	Votes	%	±%
Reform	Sam Journet*	1,280	40.9	N/A
Labour	Elizabeth Atkinson	1,133	36.2	–2.2
Conservative	Deepak Roy	351	11.2	–9.4
Green	Ellie Matthewman	316	10.1	–2.3
TUSC	Andrew Buxton	53	1.7	–5.7
Majority		147	4.7	N/A
Rejected ballots		18	0.6	
Turnout		3,151	32.6	
Registered electors		9,667		
Reform hold				

=== Wickford North ===
Wickford North
Party	Candidate	Votes	%	±%
Reform	Steven Swaby	2,106	45.3	+32.9
Conservative	Billy Merrin	1,175	25.3	+1.2
Wickford Ind.	Trevor Hammond*	545	11.7	–22.3
Green	Penny Wright	360	7.7	–1.6
Labour	Viviane Morris	252	5.4	–8.2
Liberal Democrats	Nicola Hoad	208	4.5	–2.0
Majority		931	19.9	N/A
Rejected ballots		28	0.6	
Turnout		4,674	45.2	
Registered electors		10,351		
Reform gain from Wickford Ind.				

=== Wickford Park ===
Wickford Park
Party	Candidate	Votes	%	±%
Reform	John Peters	1,640	44.5	N/A
Conservative	Lewis Hooper	1,155	31.4	+0.5
Green	Sam Twigg	279	7.6	N/A
Labour	Dean Sharpe	220	6.0	–16.8
Wickford Ind.	Sean Mundy	182	4.9	–27.0
Liberal Democrats	Mike Woods	176	4.8	–9.5
Independent	Sarah-Jane Shields*	30	0.8	N/A
Majority		485	13.1	N/A
Rejected ballots		16	0.4	
Turnout		3,698	41.2	
Registered electors		8,976		
Reform gain from Independent				
