= 2024 Basildon Borough Council election =

Local election in Basildon, England

- 2 May 2024

All 42 seats to Basildon Borough Council 22 seats needed for a majority

	First party	Second party
Leader	Maryam Yaqub	Andrew Baggott
Party	Labour	Conservative
Last election	10 seats, 29.1%	26 seats, 38.8%
Seats before	9	26 (Note: Including two vacant seats at Billericay East and Pitsea South East last held by Conservatives)
Seats won	18	13
Seat change	▲9	▼13
Popular vote	22,783	34,614
Percentage	25.5%	38.7%
Swing	▼3.6%	▼0.1%
	Third party	Fourth party
Leader	(Note: Of the six independents prior to the election, five sat together as the 'Independent Group', led by Kerry Smith.)
Party	Independent	Wickford Ind.
Last election	5 seats, 7.7%	1 seat, 7.7%
Seats before	6	1
Seats won	6	5
Seat change	Steady	▲4
Popular vote	10,462	4,839
Percentage	11.7%	5.4%
Swing	▲4.0%	▼2.3%
- Winner of each seat at the 2024 Basildon Borough Council election
Leader before election
Andrew Baggott
Conservative
Leader after election
Gavin Callaghan
Labour
No overall control

The 2024 Basildon Borough Council election was held on Thursday 2 May 2024, alongside the other local elections in the United Kingdom being held on the same day. All 42 members to the council were up for election.

== Background ==
The council usually elects members in thirds every year except the 4th in a four-year cycle. However, due to a boundary review of the wards by the Local Government Boundary Commission for England, all 42 seats to Basildon Borough Council are up for election. At the previous election, held in 2023, the Conservative Party increased their majority by 1 seat, for a total of 26 seats held by the party, keeping the council under Conservative control.

Pre-Election Composition
Party	Seats
Conservatives	26
Labour	9
Independents	6
Wickford Independent	1

== Summary ==
Prior to the election, the council was under Conservative majority control.

Following the election, the council went under no overall control, with Labour being the largest party. Labour changed its group leader after the election, with Gavin Callaghan replacing Maryam Yaqub. He went on to be appointed leader of the council at the subsequent annual council meeting on 23 May 2024. A cabinet comprising seven Labour councillors and one independent was announced at the same meeting.

=== Election result ===
2024 Basildon Borough Council election
Party	This election			Full council			This election		
Party	Seats	Net	Seats %	Other	Total	Total %	Votes	Votes %	+/−
Labour	18	▲9	42.9	0	18	42.9	22,783	25.5	–3.6
Conservative	13	▼13	31.0	0	13	31.0	34,614	38.7	–0.1
Independent	6	Steady	14.3	0	6	14.3	10,462	11.7	+4.0
Wickford Ind.	5	▲4	11.9	0	5	11.9	4,839	5.4	–2.3
Liberal Democrats	0	Steady	0.0	0	0	0.0	9,122	10.2	–3.1
Green	0	Steady	0.0	0	0	0.0	5,819	6.5	+5.4
TUSC	0	Steady	0.0	0	0	0.0	909	1.0	+0.4
British Democratic	0	Steady	0.0	0	0	0.0	475	0.5	+0.2
Reform	0	Steady	0.0	0	0	0.0	447	0.5	+0.1

== Ward results ==
The Statement of Persons Nominated, which details the candidates standing in each ward, was released by Basildon Borough Council following the close of nominations on 5 April 2024.

=== Billericay East ===
Billericay East (3 seats)
Party	Candidate	Votes	%	±%
Conservative	Andrew Schrader*	1,713	60.0	
Conservative	Andy Barnes	1,680	58.9	
Conservative	Martyn Mordecai	1,523	53.4	
Green	Andrew Brennan	922	32.3	
Green	Stewart Goshawk	784	27.5	
Green	Andy Tatman	737	25.8	
Liberal Democrats	Laura Clark	447	15.7	
Labour	Sally Bunyan	424	14.9	
Liberal Democrats	Peter Smith	333	11.7	
Registered electors		9,453		
Conservative hold				
Conservative hold				
Conservative hold				

=== Billericay West ===
Billericay West (3 seats)
Party	Candidate	Votes	%	±%
Conservative	Anthony Hedley*	1,712	63.4	
Conservative	Philip Turner*	1,667	61.7	
Conservative	Daniel Lawrence*	1,609	59.6	
Liberal Democrats	Chris May	964	35.7	
Liberal Democrats	Peter Lancaster	691	25.6	
Liberal Democrats	Tim Nicklin	627	23.2	
Labour	Brian Button	420	15.6	
Green	Scion Butler	412	15.3	
Registered electors		9,464		
Conservative hold				
Conservative hold				
Conservative hold				

=== Burstead ===
Burstead (3 seats)
Party	Candidate	Votes	%	±%
Conservative	Andrew Baggott*	1,785	65.4	
Conservative	Richard Moore*	1,716	62.9	
Conservative	Kevin Blake*	1,515	55.5	
Labour	Leslie Banks	933	34.2	
Liberal Democrats	Chris Daffin	786	28.8	
Green	Idriss Chraibi	485	17.8	
Green	Daniel McGarry	485	17.8	
Liberal Democrats	Andy Fryd	481	17.6	
Registered electors		11,065		
Conservative hold				
Conservative hold				
Conservative hold				

=== Castledon & Crouch ===
Castledon & Crouch (3 seats)
Party	Candidate	Votes	%	±%
Conservative	Alex Myers*	1,084	49.5	
Conservative	Terri Sargent*	992	45.3	
Conservative	Stuart Allen*	987	45.0	
Liberal Democrats	Stewart Mott	869	39.7	
Liberal Democrats	Nicola Hoad	793	36.2	
Labour	Angela Stanbrook	498	22.7	
Liberal Democrats	Michael Woods	477	21.8	
British Democrats	Christopher Bateman	475	21.7	
Green	Gillian Gurney	399	18.2	
Registered electors		9,300		
Conservative win (new seat)				
Conservative win (new seat)				
Conservative win (new seat)				

=== Fryerns ===
Fryerns (3 seats)
Party	Candidate	Votes	%	±%
Labour	Adele Brown*	1,160	78.5	
Labour	Andrew Ansell	1,142	77.3	
Labour	Allan Davies*	1,053	71.3	
Conservative	Ola Dawodu	529	35.8	
Liberal Democrats	Vivien Howard	329	22.3	
TUSC	Eleanor Donne	218	14.8	
Registered electors		10,594		
Labour hold				
Labour hold				
Labour hold				

=== Laindon Park ===
Laindon Park (3 seats)
Party	Candidate	Votes	%	±%
Labour	Victoria Joseph*	1,013	47.8	
Labour	Jessica Power	972	45.9	
Labour	Terry Webb*	880	41.5	
Conservative	Jeff Henry*	863	40.7	
Conservative	Kevin Wingfield*	845	39.9	
Conservative	Samuel Gascoyne*	761	35.9	
Independent	Iurie Cojocaru	358	16.9	
Green	Eugene McCarthy	312	14.7	
Liberal Democrats	Stephen McCarthy	218	10.3	
TUSC	David Murray	137	6.5	
Registered electors		9,977		
Labour hold				
Labour gain from Conservative				
Labour gain from Conservative				

=== Langdon Hills ===
Langdon Hills (3 seats)
Party	Candidate	Votes	%	±%
Independent	Hazel Green*	1,855	65.9	
Independent	Valerie Robbins*	1,850	65.7	
Independent	Walter Brown*	1,842	65.4	
Conservative	Chris Allen	718	25.5	
Labour	Dean Sharpe	583	20.7	
Conservative	Sandeep Sandhu	496	17.6	
Conservative	Stanley Edemakhiota	439	15.6	
Green	Elizabeth Grant	355	12.6	
Liberal Democrats	Stephen Nice	286	10.2	
Independent	X None Of The Above	26	0.9	
Registered electors		10,904		
Independent hold				
Independent hold				
Independent win (new seat)				

=== Lee Chapel North ===
Lee Chapel North (3 seats)
Party	Candidate	Votes	%	±%
Labour	Alex Harrison*	1,148	76.3	
Labour	Melissa McGeorge*	1,005	66.8	
Labour	Aidan McGurran	900	59.8	
Conservative	Deepak Shukla	474	31.5	
Conservative	Joanna Wingfield	472	31.4	
Liberal Democrats	Mike Chandler	289	19.2	
TUSC	Elaine McDonald	227	15.1	
Registered electors		10,225		
Labour hold				
Labour hold				
Labour gain from Independent				

=== Nethermayne ===
Nethermayne (3 seats)
Party	Candidate	Votes	%	±%
Independent	Kerry Smith*	1,490	80.8	
Independent	Mo Larkin*	1,307	70.9	
Independent	Eddie Murphy	1,168	63.3	
Labour	Yanik Moyet	576	31.2	
Conservative	Ann Blake	313	17.0	
Liberal Democrats	Lewis Chambers	266	14.4	
Conservative	Dave Martin	251	13.6	
Conservative	Maz Uluhan	163	8.8	
Registered electors		10,185		
Independent hold				
Independent hold				
Independent hold				

=== Pitsea North West ===
Pitsea North West (3 seats)
Party	Candidate	Votes	%	±%
Labour	Michael Baker	1,026	59.1	
Labour	Emma Callaghan	1,012	58.3	
Labour	Pat Reid*	965	55.6	
Conservative	Stuart Burke Terson*	706	40.7	
Conservative	Lewis Smith	605	34.8	
Conservative	Mark Cottrell	558	32.1	
Liberal Democrats	Martin Howard	200	11.5	
TUSC	Jack Huggins	137	7.9	
Registered electors		9,285		
Labour gain from Conservative				
Labour gain from Conservative				
Labour hold				

=== Pitsea South East ===
Pitsea South East (3 seats)
Party	Candidate	Votes	%	±%
Labour	Christopher Hilleard	1,093	49.1	
Labour	Gillian Palmer	1,082	48.6	
Labour	Ben Westwick	1,001	44.9	
Conservative	Craig Rimmer*	938	42.1	
Conservative	Gary Canham*	907	40.7	
Conservative	Yetunde Adeshile*	895	40.2	
Independent	Linda Harrison	301	13.5	
Green	Steven Willis	272	12.2	
Liberal Democrats	Steven Spowart	193	8.7	
Registered electors		10,152		
Labour gain from Conservative				
Labour gain from Conservative				
Labour gain from Conservative				

=== St. Martin's ===
St. Martin's (3 seats)
Party	Candidate	Votes	%	±%
Labour	Gavin Callaghan	990	60.9	
Labour	Jack Ferguson	965	59.3	
Labour	Maryam Yaqub*	820	50.4	
Conservative	Davida Ademuyiwa*	532	32.7	
Conservative	Deepak Roy	514	31.6	
Green	Ellie Matthewman	319	19.6	
Independent	Simon Breedon	305	18.8	
Liberal Democrats	Phil Jenkins	243	14.9	
TUSC	Andrew Buxton	190	11.7	
Registered electors		9,950		
Labour gain from Conservative				
Labour hold				
Labour win (new seat)				

=== Wickford North ===
Wickford North (3 seats)
Party	Candidate	Votes	%	±%
Wickford Ind.	Eunice Brockman*	1,228	52.4	
Wickford Ind.	David Aldridge	963	41.1	
Wickford Ind.	Trevor Hammond	936	40.0	
Conservative	Peter Holliman*	872	37.2	
Conservative	Carole Morris*	794	33.9	
Conservative	Don Morris*	720	30.7	
Labour	Joe Nemeth	493	21.1	
Reform	Dave Collins	447	19.1	
Green	Penny Wright	337	14.4	
Liberal Democrats	Karen Manterfield	235	10.0	
Registered electors		10,253		
Wickford Ind. hold				
Wickford Ind. gain from Conservative				
Wickford Ind. gain from Conservative				

=== Wickford Park ===
Wickford Park (3 seats)
Party	Candidate	Votes	%	±%
Wickford Ind.	Alan Ball	881	52.8	
Conservative	George Jeffery*	853	51.2	
Wickford Ind.	David Harrison	831	49.8	
Conservative	Yvonne Child*	747	44.8	
Conservative	Gary Tagg	666	39.9	
Labour	Peter Bunyan	629	37.7	
Liberal Democrats	Simon Blake	395	23.7	
Registered electors		8,972		
Wickford Ind. gain from Conservative				
Conservative hold				
Wickford Ind. gain from Conservative				

== By-elections ==
=== Wickford Park ===
Wickford Park by-election: 26 June 2025
Party	Candidate	Votes	%	±%
Reform	Sarah-Jane Shields	922	40.6	N/A
Conservative	Lewis Hooper	840	37.0	+6.1
Liberal Democrats	Stewart Mott	171	7.5	–6.8
Wickford Ind.	Andrew Carter	148	6.5	–25.4
Labour	Wayne Milne	146	6.4	–16.4
Green	Penny Wright	43	1.9	N/A
Majority		82	3.6	N/A
Turnout		2,271	25.3	N/A
Registered electors		8,995		
Reform gain from Wickford Ind.				

=== St Martins ===
St Martins by-election: 17 July 2025
Party	Candidate	Votes	%	±%
Reform	Sam Journet	1,057	44.6	N/A
Labour	Elizabeth Atkinson	833	35.1	–3.3
Conservative	Deepak Roy	320	13.5	–7.1
Green	Eleanor Matthewman	82	3.5	–8.9
Liberal Democrats	Michael Chandler	39	1.6	–7.8
TUSC	Andrew Buxton	26	1.1	–6.3
SDP	Simon Breedon	13	0.5	N/A
Majority		224	9.5	N/A
Turnout		2,375	24.7	N/A
Registered electors		9,633		
Reform gain from Labour				
