= Borough of Basildon =

Non-metropolitan district and borough in Essex, England

- Non-metropolitan district and borough
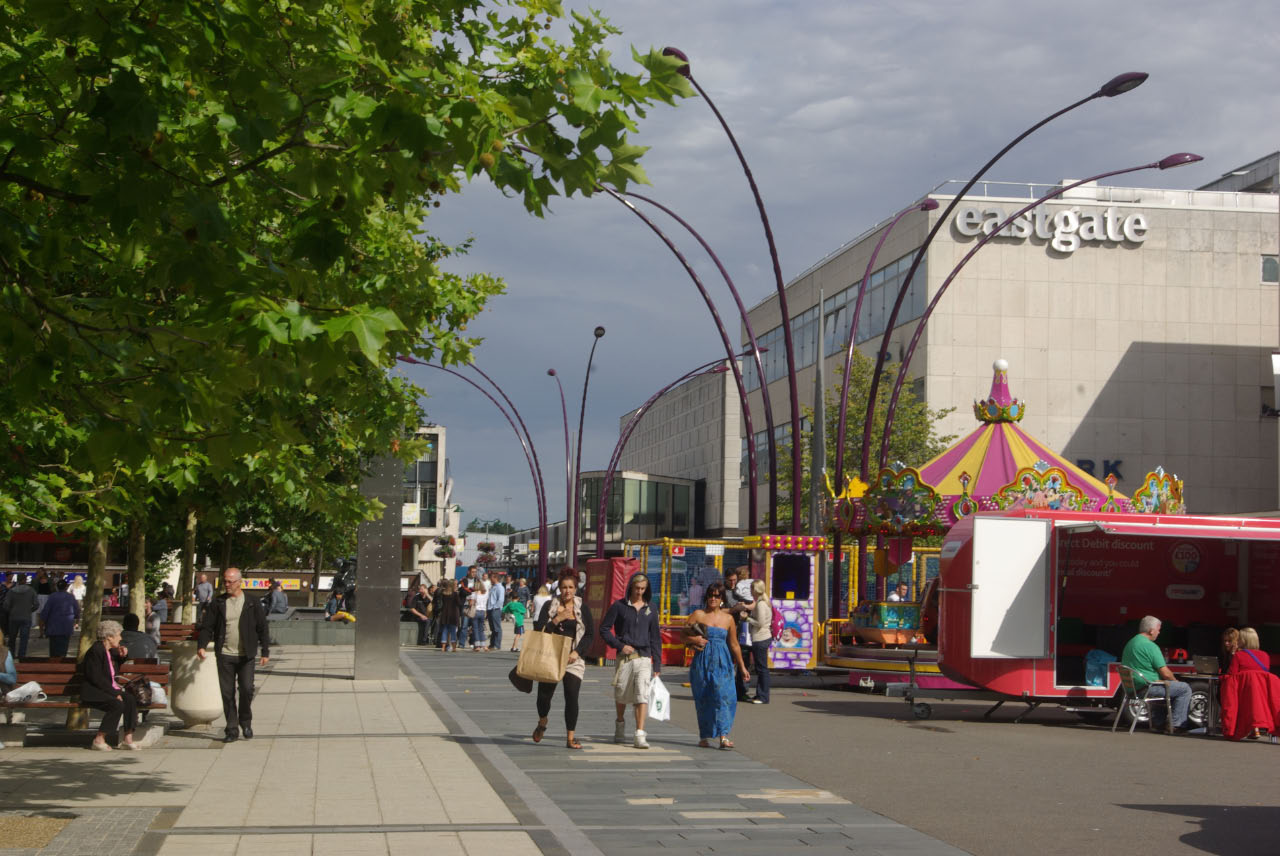
- Basildon, the administrative centre of the borough

- Basildon shown within Essex
- Interactive map of Borough of Basildon
- Coordinates: 51.5705°N 0.4545°E
- Sovereign state: United Kingdom
- Country: England
- Region: East of England
- Non-metropolitan county: Essex
- Status: Non-metropolitan district, Borough
- Admin HQ: Basildon
- Incorporated: 1 April 1974

Government
  - Type: Non-metropolitan district council
  - Body: Basildon Borough Council
  - MPs: Richard Holden, James McMurdock, Mark Francois

Area
  - Total: 42.48 sq mi (110.02 km^{2})
  - Rank: 187th (of 296)

Population (2025)
  - Total: 193,489
  - Rank: 107th (of 296)
  - Density: 4,554.9/sq mi (1,758.7/km^{2})

Ethnicity (2021)
  - Ethnic groups: List: 87.5% White; 4.8% Black; 4.3% Asian; 2.6% Mixed; 0.9% other

Religion (2021)
  - Religion: List: 46.5% Christianity; 44.1% no religion; 7.6% other; 1.8% Islam
- Time zone: UTC0 (GMT)
  - Summer (DST): UTC+1 (BST)
- GSS code: E07000066
- OS grid reference: TQ735895

The Borough of Basildon is a local government district with borough status in Essex, England. It is named after its largest town, Basildon, where the council is based. The borough also includes the towns of Billericay and Wickford, and surrounding rural areas.

The borough borders the City of Chelmsford to the north, the Borough of Brentwood to the west, the Thurrock unitary authority area to the south, the Borough of Castle Point to the south-east, and Rochford District to the north-east.

== History ==
Billericay Urban District was created in 1934. In 1955, it was renamed Basildon Urban District to reflect the growth of Basildon, which had been designated a new town in 1949.

Urban districts were abolished on 1 April 1974, under the Local Government Act 1972. On this date, a new non-metropolitan district called Basildon was created, covering the whole area of the former Basildon Urban District plus the small part of the neighbouring Thurrock Urban District which fell within the designated area for Basildon New Town.

In the 1990s, Basildon applied to become a unitary authority but this was declined. The government asserted that the divergent interests of the three main towns meant any change to the status quo should involve splitting the borough; with Billericay and Wickford joining the districts of Brentwood and Rochford respectively.

The district was awarded borough status in 2010, allowing the chair of the council to take the title of Mayor, with Mo Larkin being appointed the first.

In March 2026, the government announced that it would abolish the district in 2028 as part of local government reform across Essex. These proposals were withdrawn in September 2026.

== Governance ==
Basildon Borough Council

Type
- Type: Non-metropolitan district

History
- Founded: 1 April 1974

Leadership
- Mayor: Sam Journet, Reform UK since 21 May 2026
- Leader: Andy Barnes, Conservative since 21 May 2026
- Chief Executive: Julian Ellerby

Structure
- Seats: 42 councillors
- Graph of the party split among 42 seats.
- Political groups: Administration (12) Conservative (12) Other parties (30) Reform UK (12) Labour (12) Independent (3) Wickford Ind. (3)
- Length of term: Third of council elected three years out of four

Elections
- Last election: 7 May 2026
- Next election: 6 May 2027

Meeting place
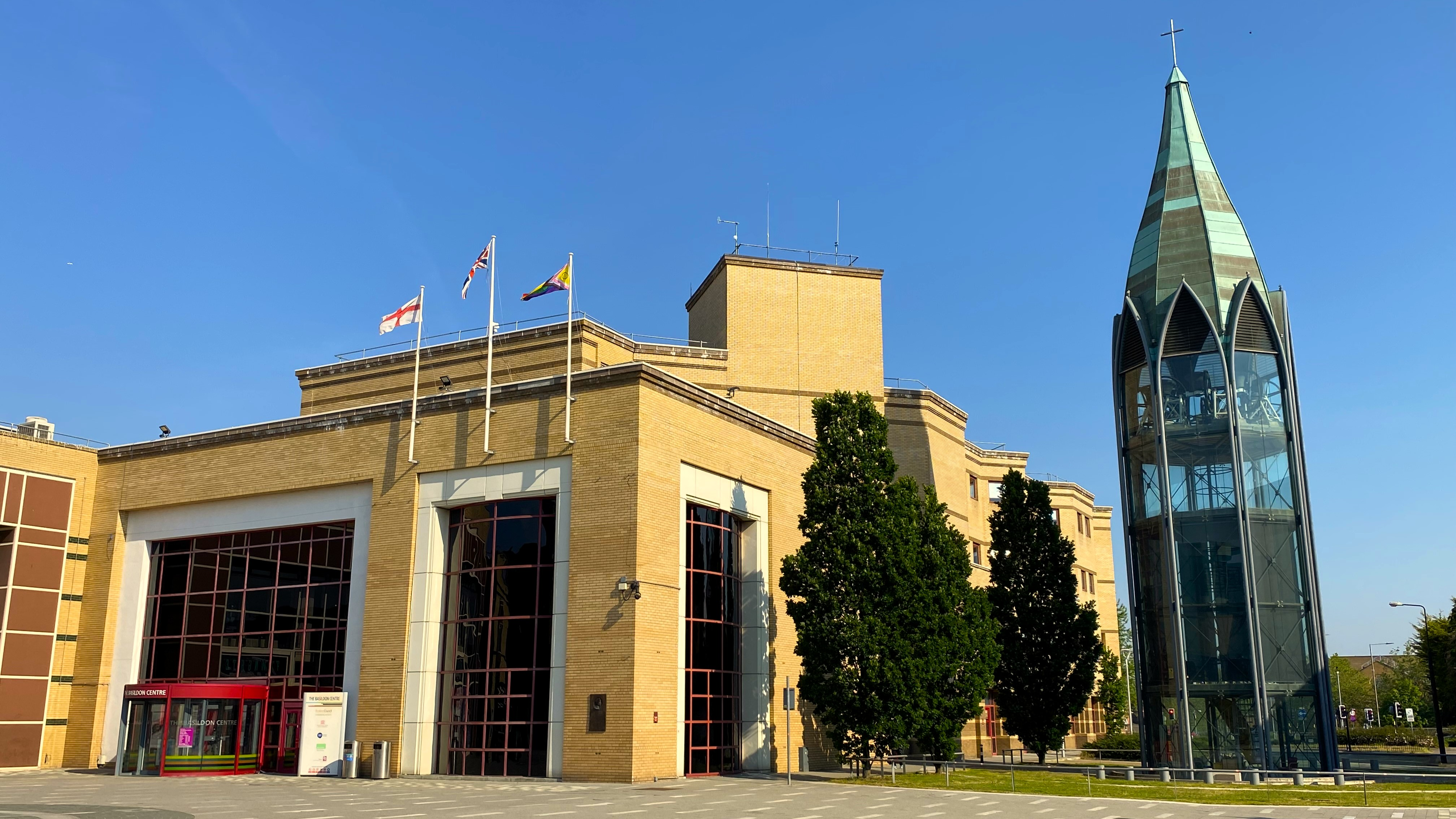
- The Basildon Centre, St Martin's Square, Basildon, SS14 1DL

Website
- www.basildon.gov.uk

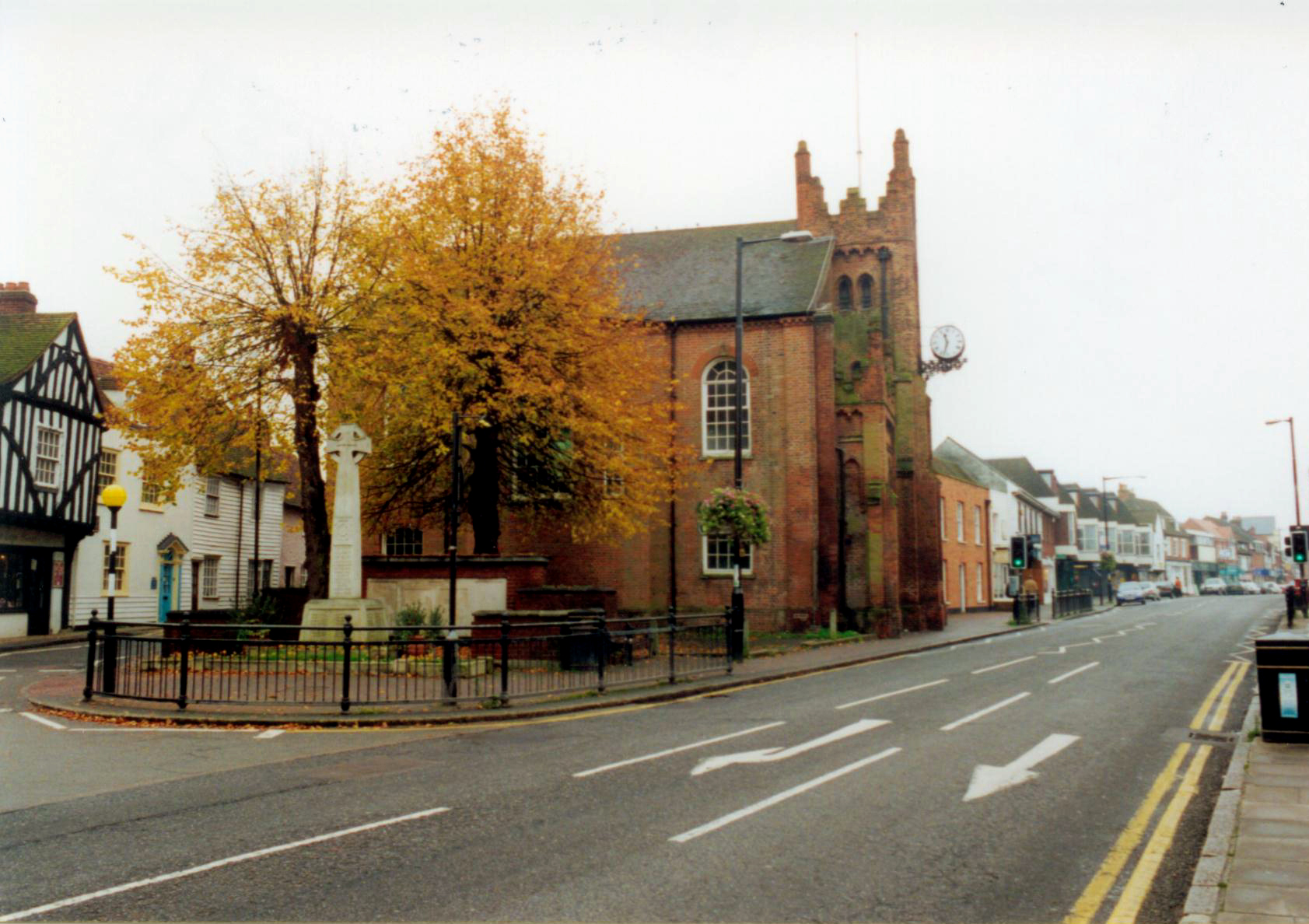
Billericay, one of the towns in the borough

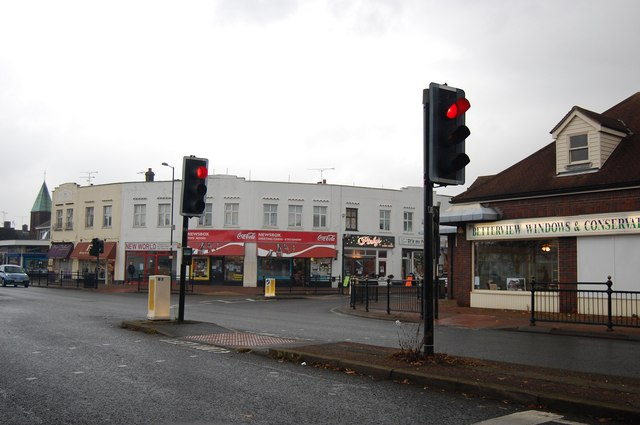
Wickford, another town in the borough

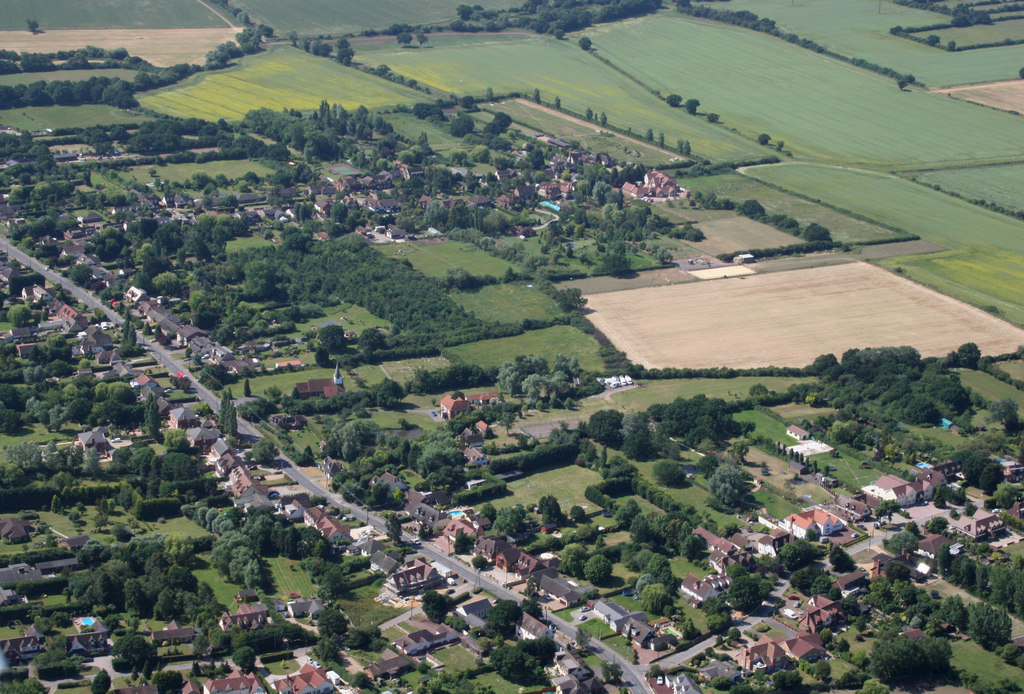
Ramsden Bellhouse, one of the villages in the borough

Basildon Borough Council provides district-level services, while County-level services are provided by Essex County Council. Parts of the borough are also covered by civil parishes, which form a third tier of local government.

=== Political control ===
The council has been under no overall control since the 2024 election, with Conservatives and Labour the joint largest parties since the 2026 election. The council is run by a minority Conservative administration with support from Reform UK.

The first election to the council was held in 1973, initially operating as a shadow authority alongside the outgoing authorities until the new arrangements came into effect on 1 April 1974. Political control of the council since 1974 has been as follows:

Party in control	Years
Labour	1974–1976
No overall control	1976–1982
Labour	1982–1987
No overall control	1987–1990
Labour	1990–1991
No overall control	1991–1992
Conservative	1992–1994
No overall control	1994–1996
Labour	1996–2000
No overall control	2000–2003
Conservative	2003–2014
No overall control	2014–2018
Conservative	2018–2019
No overall control	2019–2021
Conservative	2021–2024
No overall control	2024–present

=== Leadership ===
The role of mayor is ceremonial in Basildon. Political leadership is instead provided by the leader of the council. The leaders since 1996 have been:

Councillor	Party	From	To
John Potter	Labour	1996	May 2002
Nigel Smith	Labour	May 2002	Oct 2002
Malcolm Buckley	Conservative	Nov 2002	21 May 2009
Tony Ball	Conservative	21 May 2009	May 2014
Phil Turner	Conservative	12 Jun 2014	25 May 2017
Gavin Callaghan	Labour	25 May 2017	May 2018
Andrew Baggott	Conservative	24 May 2018	May 2019
Gavin Callaghan	Labour	23 May 2019	May 2021
Andrew Baggott	Conservative	27 May 2021	May 2024
Gavin Callaghan	Labour	23 May 2024	May 2026
Andy Barnes	Conservative	21 May 2026	

=== Composition ===
Following the 2026 election plus one defection from the independent group, on November 2026 the composition of the council was:

Party	Councillors
Conservative	12
Labour	12
Reform	12
Independent	3
Wickford Independents	3
Total	42

The 3 independent councillors sit together as the Independent Group.

=== Premises ===
The council has its headquarters at the Basildon Centre on St Martin's Square in Basildon Town Centre. The building was purpose-built for the council in 1989, at a cost of £17.5 million. It was formally opened on 14 November 1989 by Jack Cunningham, the Shadow Leader of the House of Commons. The building also contains the town's library.

== Elections ==
Since the last boundary changes in 2024, the council has comprised 42 councillors representing 14 wards, with each ward electing three councillors. Elections are held in three out of every four years, with a third of the council (one councillor for each ward) elected each time for a four-year term of office.

Essex County Council elections are held in the fourth year of the cycle when there are no borough council elections.

== Towns and parishes ==
Basildon population pyramid

There are nine civil parishes in the borough. The town of Basildon itself is an unparished area, as is a small area west of Wickford. The parish councils for Billericay and Wickford are styled "town councils", whilst that for Great Burstead and South Green is styled a "village council". The civil parishes are:

- Billericay
- Bowers Gifford and North Benfleet
- Great Burstead and South Green
- Little Burstead
- Noak Bridge
- Ramsden Bellhouse
- Ramsden Crays
- Shotgate
- Wickford

== Geography ==
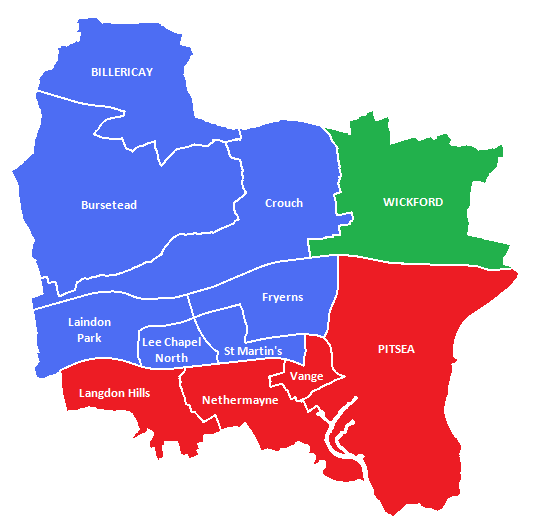
Constituencies within the Basildon district. Blue: Billericay and Basildon Red: Basildon South and Thurrock East Green: Rayleigh and Wickford

The district has three main urban areas: Basildon, Billericay and Wickford. Proposals to move Billericay and Wickford to other districts, leaving Basildon district more focused on the new town, were considered in the 1990s, but were rejected.

The new town of Basildon grew to absorb four earlier settlements: Laindon, Basildon, Vange and Pitsea (from west to east) which have merged with other minor hamlets.

The remaining land, approximately half of the district is designated as green belt, has several sites of special scientific interest: two are around Billericay and the remainder are to the south of Basildon New Town. There are also wildlife areas of varying sizes around most of the district, except in the east.

The source of the River Crouch is in the district; it runs across the district, through Wickford before it leaves the district.

In the west of the Basildon district, the Dunton Plotlands is an area of small plots of land used as weekend cottages or smallholdings inhabited during the mid-20th century.

=== List of settlements ===
It contains the towns of:

- Basildon (the administrative headquarters)
  - Laindon
  - Langdon Hills
  - Pitsea
  - Vange
- Billericay
- Wickford.

Villages within the district are:

- Bowers Gifford
- Crays Hill
- Dunton Wayletts
- Great Berry
- Great Burstead
- Havering's Grove (part)
- Little Burstead
- Nevendon
- North Benfleet
- Ramsden Bellhouse
- Shotgate.

== Regeneration plans ==
Basildon District is a prosperous business location and has in recent years seen significant inward investment and jobs growth. Development projects with an estimated combined value of nearly £2 billion have been proposed, including:

- The regeneration of Basildon, Wickford, Pitsea and Laindon town centres
- A new sporting village and improvements to playing pitches and sports facilities throughout the district, including an Olympic (50m) size swimming pool
- The creation of a health and education research centre, near Basildon and Thurrock University Hospital and further education college
- Investment in the Basildon Enterprise Corridor, the largest business area in the Thames Gateway outside London. It is home to 45,000 jobs and over 5,000 businesses, including Ford, Selex, Visteon, Case New Holland, First Data Europe, International Financial Services Limited, RBS and Starbucks
- The creation of one of the largest wetland nature reserves in Europe in the Thames Marshes by the RSPB, Land Restoration Trust, Basildon District Council and Veolia
- A strategic review of the district's housing, with investment in housing estates such as Craylands, Five Links and Felmores to create first class places to live.

Co-ordinating and promoting this programme of investment is the Basildon Renaissance Partnership, which was set up in 2003 by Basildon District Council. Its partners also include the East of England Development Agency, English Partnerships, Essex County Council and the Thames Gateway South Essex Partnership, with support from the Department for Communities and Local Government.

It was reported that the council had decided to sell a plot of land it bought for £1 million for £1 in order to build a four-star hotel. The Conservative leader described the sale as "doomed to failure".

== Transport ==
=== Railway ===
The district is connected to London and Southend via two railway lines:

- London, Tilbury & Southend line - c2c operates services on this line from Basildon, Laindon and Pitsea
- Shenfield to Southend Line - Greater Anglia provides services from Billericay and Wickford; the Crouch Valley Line to Southminster diverges from the Shenfield to Southend line at Wickford.

=== Buses ===
The area is served primarily by First Essex, along with NIBS Buses and Ensignbus; they operate routes throughout the borough, to Brentwood, Chelmsford, Southend, Grays, Lakeside shopping centre and Upminster.

=== Roads ===
Four primary routes run within the district:

- A13 - goes through the south-east at Pitsea
- A127 - passes through its centre
- A129 - the major road link between Billericay and Wickford, which are linked via A-roads to the urban area of Basildon, Pitsea and Laindon by the A176 and the A132 respectively
- A130 - connects the district with Chelmsford.

The A13 and A127 both connect the district with Greater London and Southend-on-Sea. In Bowers Gifford, at a terminus of the A13's primary status, there is a junction with the beginning of primary status for the A130, which runs along a small section of the western boundary of the district.

== Freedom of the borough ==
The following people and military units have received the Freedom of the Borough of Basildon.

=== Individuals ===
- Max Whitlock: February 2016
- Stuart Bingham: February 2016
- Trudi Westmore-Cox: September 2019
- Donald Sheppard: September 2019.

=== Military units ===
- The Royal Anglian Regiment: April 2011.

=== Organisations and groups ===
- Basildon & Brentwood Clinical Commissioning Group: 27 May 2021
- Mid and South Essex NHS Foundation Trust: 27 May 2021
- North East London NHS Foundation Trust: 27 May 2021
- Essex Partnership University NHS Foundation Trust: 27 May 2021
- East of England Ambulance Service NHS trust: 23 October 2021.
